= 1992 Hooters 500 =

29th race of the 1992 NASCAR Winston Cup Series

Race details
- Race 29 of 29 in the 1992 NASCAR Winston Cup Series season
- The 1992 Hooters 500 program cover, paying tribute to Richard Petty, who would retire from NASCAR after the race.
- Date: November 15, 1992
- Official name: Hooters 500
- Location: Atlanta Motor Speedway, Hampton, Georgia
- Course: Permanent racing facility
- Course length: 1.522 miles (2.449 km)
- Distance: 328 laps, 499.216 mi (803.410 km)
- Weather: Sunny & Cold with temperatures up to 57 °F (14 °C); wind speeds up to 13 miles per hour (21 km/h)
- Average speed: 133.322 miles per hour (214.561 km/h)
- Attendance: 162,500

Pole position
Driver	Rick Mast	Richard Jackson Racing
- Time: 30.409

Most laps led
Driver	Alan Kulwicki	AK Racing
- Laps: 103

Winner
No. 11	Bill Elliott	Junior Johnson & Associates

Television in the United States
- Network: ESPN
- Announcers: Bob Jenkins, Benny Parsons and Ned Jarrett

The 1992 Hooters 500 was the 29th and final race of the 1992 NASCAR season. It was held on November 15, 1992, at Atlanta Motor Speedway and is widely considered the greatest NASCAR race of all time, with three stories dominating the race: the debut of Jeff Gordon in the Winston Cup Series, the final race of seven-time champion Richard Petty's thirty-five-year career, and the battle for the series points championship with six drivers mathematically eligible to win the title.

The race was won by Bill Elliott in the No. 11 Budweiser Ford for Junior Johnson and Associates, recording his fifth win of the 1992 season. Alan Kulwicki, driving the No. 7 Hooters Ford for his self-owned AK Racing, won the championship by finishing second behind Elliott.

The 1992 Hooters 500 represented the 33rd running of the Atlanta fall race, and the sixth time the event was held as the NASCAR season finale.

== Background ==
In 1992 Atlanta Motor Speedway was one of eight intermediate tracks, a track between one and two miles in length, to hold a Winston Cup Series race. The layout at Atlanta Motor Speedway at the time was a four-turn traditional oval track that was 1.522 miles (2.449 km) long. The track's turns are banked at twenty-four degrees, while the front stretch, the location of the finish line, and the back stretch are banked at five.

The race, and its subsequent championship outcome, was run under the points system that had been introduced to NASCAR in 1975. In this system, which was used until the end of 2003 season in the Cup Series, the drivers competed to have the highest cumulative point total at the end of the season, when they would be awarded the Winston Cup. Under this system, the possibility existed that a driver could win the Winston Cup with several races to spare. However, the opposite was also true as a points race could be so tight that it would take until the final race of the year to decide it and multiple drivers could conceivably become champion. This race was a case in point for the latter, as six drivers entered Atlanta with a shot at the championship.

=== Media coverage ===
==== Television ====
ESPN broadcast the race to a nationwide television audience as part of its Speedworld motor racing series. Bob Jenkins was the lap-by-lap commentator with Benny Parsons and Ned Jarrett as analysts in the booth. Jerry Punch and John Kernan reported from pit road.

==== Radio ====
The race was also carried over radio by Motor Racing Network. Barney Hall & Eli Gold manned the announce position in the booth. Joe Moore reported from turns one and two, with Allen Bestwick stationed in turns three and four. Jim Phillips, Winston Kelley, and former NASCAR driver Dick Brooks covered the action for MRN from the pit and garage areas.

== Pre-race ==
=== Championship battle ===
The six drivers, in order of their positions in the Winston Cup standings entering the race weekend, were Davey Allison in the #28 Texaco/Havoline Ford for Robert Yates Racing, Kulwicki, Elliott, Harry Gant in the #33 Skoal Bandit Oldsmobile for Leo Jackson Motorsports; Kyle Petty in the #42 Mello Yello Pontiac for Felix Sabates' Team SABCO; and Mark Martin in the #6 Valvoline Ford for Roush Racing.

==== Davey Allison (leader) ====
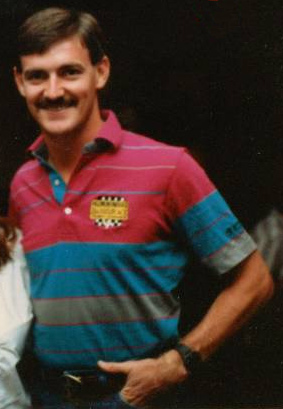
Davey Allison

Allison, coming off of a 1991 season that saw him win five times and come in third place in the final standings, picked up where he had left off in 1992 and won the season opening Daytona 500. After recording five consecutive top five finishes to open the season, Allison suffered the first of several big wrecks when he crashed out of the spring Bristol race in April. While he rebounded the next week to win at North Wilkesboro and then two races after that at Talladega, Allison would suffer a violent crash as he crossed the finish line to win The Winston in May, coming away with a bruised lung and concussion. Then, at Pocono in July, he spun off on the back stretch and the car became airborne and rotated several times; he suffered another concussion and a severely broken arm in the accident but continued to race. While he continued to race well, including winning at Michigan in June, Allison also had several finishes of thirtieth or worse due to accidents; his crew chief, Larry McReynolds, referred to this trend as “checkers or wreckers” years later. He also had to deal with a personal tragedy after his brother Clifford, driving in the Busch Series, was killed in a practice crash in August at Michigan.

One of the places where Allison's bad luck struck was at Darlington during the running of the Southern 500, one of the races that at the time comprised the Winston Million. R.J. Reynolds, the company that owned Cup Series title sponsor Winston Cigarettes at the time, offered a $1 million bonus to a driver if he managed to win three of NASCAR's four biggest events in a single season, which at the time consisted of the Daytona 500, the spring race at Talladega, the Coca-Cola 600, and the Southern 500. Bill Elliott was the only driver to accomplish this feat to date, having done so in 1985; Allison's first chance to win the $1 million bonus was at the Coca-Cola 600, but he had not won the race, which meant that he would need to win at Darlington to clinch it.

The race was run under questionable weather conditions and, thanks to a crew member misreading a radar screen, Allison pitted instead of staying out with the lead. Five laps after he pitted, handing the lead to Darrell Waltrip, the race was called due to rain. Allison finished fifth, while Waltrip recorded his second victory of the year, the final victory of his NASCAR career, and his first in the Southern 500, enabling him to complete a career Grand Slam by winning all four of NASCAR's Crown Jewels.

After a late season series of struggles by Elliott, Allison was able to rally back into contention and when he won second to last race of the season at Phoenix, his fifth victory of 1992, he reclaimed the points lead. Entering the Hooters 500, Allison was the only driver who controlled his own destiny. Running fifth or better would clinch the title for him outright. If he led a lap, he would clinch the title with a seventh-place finish or better. If Allison managed to lead the most laps, he only needed to finish eighth or better.

Allison was attempting to become the second second-generation driver to win the Winston Cup Championship - his father Bobby won the title in 1983. At the time, Lee and Richard Petty were the only father-son duo to be Cup Series champions.

==== Alan Kulwicki (—30) ====
"UNDERBIRD" lettering on Kulwicki's front bumper

Kulwicki entered the final race of the season with two victories, winning the spring Bristol race that Allison crashed out of and following that up with a victory in June at Pocono. While his win total was not as high as the five for Allison or the four for Elliott, Kulwicki's strength was his consistency. Entering the Hooters 500 race weekend, Kulwicki had recorded a total of sixteen top ten finishes in the twenty-eight races run to that point, ten of which were top five finishes. In eight of the other twelve races, Kulwicki finished inside the top twenty, and he was running at the end of all but two races.

Kulwicki also had personal reasons for wanting to win the championship, as his career had nearly been derailed by Elliott's car owner Junior Johnson. Over the previous few seasons, Johnson had actually approached Kulwicki twice with offers to drive for his team. In 1989, Kulwicki turned down an offer to drive the #11 car for Johnson. Toward the end of the 1990 season, Johnson had decided to field a second car for 1991 and again asked Kulwicki to drive it, going as far as to offer him a seven-figure deal for his services; he again declined.

However, in 1990, Kulwicki's team was not on as secure financial footing as it had been in 1989. He had been running with sponsorship from Zerex, a brand of coolants owned by Valvoline's parent company Ashland Oil, since 1987, but they had decided not to renew their contract for another year. He had been negotiating with Kraft General Foods to bring Maxwell House Coffee on board, and the sides appeared ready to strike a deal.

Johnson, meanwhile, was furious that he had been rejected twice by Kulwicki and went to Kraft General Foods himself, convincing them to instead sponsor his second team for 1991. This left Kulwicki to run the operation out of pocket until he could find a full-time sponsor. After he qualified on the pole at Atlanta in the spring, he was approached by executives from Hooters, which was based in Atlanta and had sponsored a car that failed to qualify. Kulwicki agreed to terms with Hooters, thus bringing in the much needed sponsor money and allowing the team to continue running.

Kulwicki asked for and got approval from NASCAR to place two Mighty Mouse decals on the front of his car, covering the TH in “Thunderbird” so it read “Underbird”; he did this largely because he felt like, as the only driver in the championship mix running his own team, he was the underdog in the fight. Recent events would seem to support his theory; after he crashed out of the Peak Antifreeze 500 at Dover, which resulted in a 34th-place finish and relegated to a 278-point deficit, Kulwicki culled together a streak of five consecutive top fifteen finishes, four of which were top fives, and climbed back into contention as the drivers ahead of him began to falter.

Like Allison, Kulwicki had a chance to join the Petty family in the NASCAR history books. The aforementioned Lee Petty was the last owner-driver to win the Winston Cup.

==== Bill Elliott (—40) ====
After spending his entire full-time NASCAR career with Melling Racing driving the #9 car, Elliott joined up with Junior Johnson for 1992. He was coming off of a season where he, for the first time since he became a full-time driver in Winston Cup, failed to finish in the top ten in points. The pairing bore fruit almost immediately, as the 1988 series champion added another record to his résumé.

Despite running poorly at Daytona, Elliott went on to win the GM Goodwrench 500 at Rockingham, the Pontiac Excitement 400 at Richmond, Atlanta's spring event in the Motorcraft Quality Parts 500, and the TranSouth 500 at Darlington in consecutive weeks. This tied the NASCAR Cup Series record, which had at the time only been done four other times, the most recently by Harry Gant one season earlier.

Allison's inconsistent performance and injuries kept Elliott close enough to him in the standings and enabled him to take the championship lead into the summer months and build upon it. After the Daytona 500, Elliott did not finish outside of the top 20 in any event and recorded fourteen top tens prior to the Peak Antifreeze 500 at Dover in September. He ran second there, improving on his result from the spring when he finished 13th, and opened up what was then a 154-point lead on second place driver Allison.

After that, however, things took a bad turn. Elliott finished 31st in a 32 car field at Martinsville a week after the Dover race after an engine failure, followed that up with a 26th-place run at North Wilkesboro finishing multiple laps down, and finished 30th at Charlotte after his sway bar broke. Elliott managed to finish in the top five at Rockingham again when the series returned there in late October, and entered Phoenix with a seventy-point lead over Allison. There, he was forced to withdraw after a cracked cylinder head caused his engine to fail. Allison's win combined with Elliott's 31st-place finish caused a 110-point swing in the standings; Elliott left Phoenix not only trailing Allison but also Kulwicki, who had run fourth.

Elliott's goals were to finish run up front and put as much distance between himself and both the #28 and the #7. All three drivers had run in the top 10 at the spring event at Atlanta, so Elliott would likely need misfortune to befall both Allison and Kulwicki.

==== Harry Gant (—97) ====
At 52 years of age, Harry Gant was looking to become the oldest champion in Cup series history. Gant was in the middle of a late-career resurgence in 1991–1992. In September 1991, Gant won a record-tying four Cup races in a row (along with two Busch Series races), earning him the nickname "Mr. September". He finished 4th in points in 1991, and entered the 1992 season with considerable momentum.

Entering the Hooters 500, Gant had recorded a total of ten top-five finishes and fifteen top-tens. He started the season off with eight top-fives in the first 11 races, giving him an early advantage in the points standings. Gant had two wins to his credit, winning the spring race at Dover and the August race at Michigan. He was in the top four in the points standings from the spring race at Richmond through the fall race at Charlotte. After his win at Dover in June, he ranked as high as second. At the Mellow Yellow 500, despite recording another top ten finish, he was outpaced by three of his fellow contenders and slipped to fifth in points. After placing sixth at Rockingham in the penultimate race, he finished 14th at Phoenix.

==== Kyle Petty (—98) ====
Petty had an opportunity to do something no driver had ever done to that point, as if he managed to become champion Kyle would join grandfather Lee and father Richard as champion and become the first third-generation driver to do so.

Of the championship contenders, Petty's seventeen top 10 finishes were tied with Mark Martin for the most. He, like Gant and Kulwicki, had two wins to this point. The first was at Watkins Glen in August, and he won again at Rockingham in November. Nine of his finishes were in the top ten, and after he finished 29th at Dover in the spring, Petty managed to finish no lower than fourteenth in all the events he ran from Sears Point through his second win at Rockingham. Also, like Kulwicki, Petty got hot as Elliott began his downward slide and recorded five straight finishes within the top five, starting at Dover and ending at Rockingham. A 19th-place finish at Phoenix cost him some ground, but had not ruined his chances.

==== Mark Martin (—113) ====
Martin, the furthest back of the championship contenders, was looking to win his first Winston Cup and had come close to doing so only two years earlier, finishing second to Dale Earnhardt.

After only recording one win in 1991, Martin doubled that total in 1992 with wins at Martinsville and Charlotte. His seventeen top tens, as mentioned previously, were tied with Kyle Petty for the most in the series, and eleven of those finishes were in the top five. However, he had been tripped up by a late race crash at Rockingham and lost a significant amount of ground to the points leaders. Martin's second-place run behind Allison at Phoenix allowed him to gain a significant number of those points back, as he went from 178 points back to 113. Still, he and the other two drivers in front of him would need both a win and for Allison, Kulwicki, and Elliott to have problems that would make them backmarkers.

Of the six championship contenders, the only one that was a former Winston Cup champion was Elliott, who was the 1988 series champion. The closest former champion to Elliott in points was eighth place Darrell Waltrip, the owner-driver of the #17 Western Auto Chevrolet who was not mathematically able to win the title.

Championship standings entering the 1992 Hooters 500

1. **Davey Allison**, 3928 points
2. **Alan Kulwicki**, −30
3. **Bill Elliott**, −40
4. **Harry Gant**, −97
5. **Kyle Petty**, −98
6. **Mark Martin**, −113
7. Ricky Rudd, −281
8. Darrell Waltrip, −363
9. Terry Labonte, −414
10. Ernie Irvan, −429

Bold indicates drivers mathematically eligible for the 1992 NASCAR Winston Cup championship

== Richard Petty's Fan Appreciation Tour ==
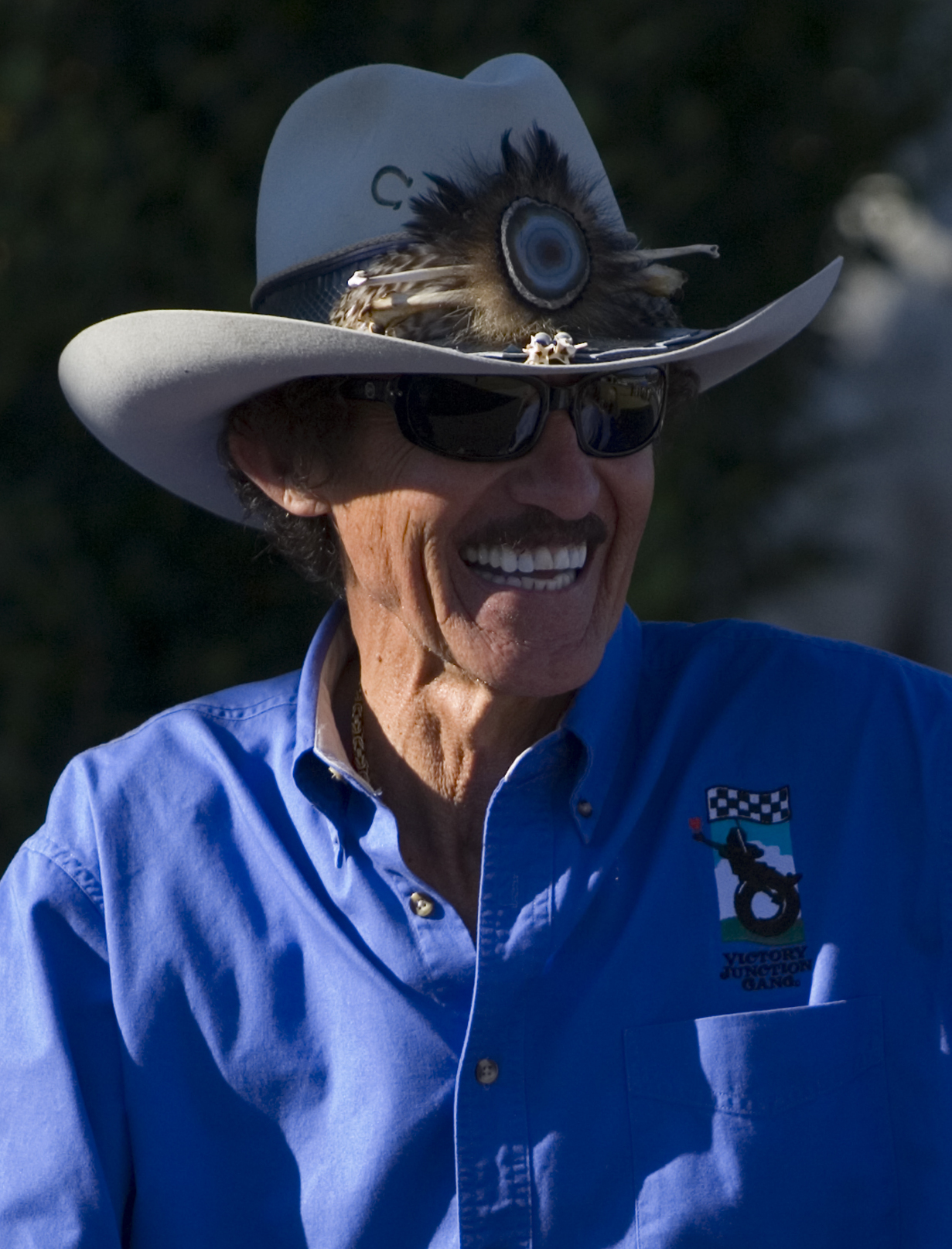
Richard Petty

Since this was the last event of the season, it also marked the final stop on Richard Petty's "Fan Appreciation Tour." On October 1, 1991, Petty announced he would retire at the end of the 1992 season. He planned on running the entire season, not just selected events, and to that point, had managed to qualify for all 28 of the events in 1992. Media coverage of Petty's final race was extensive, and the weeks leading up to the race saw considerable pre-race hype and anticipation. Ticket sales were brisk, and a record sell-out crowd was expected at Atlanta to see "King Richard" in his final event.

Under the spotlight of attention during the 1992 season, Petty's on-track results had been so far unimpressive. He had scored zero top tens, and had a best finish of 15th (three times). His most notable race of the season came at Daytona during the July 4 Pepsi 400. With President George H. W. Bush in attendance, Petty was honored during the pre-race ceremonies. He qualified on the outside of the front row, and led the first five laps of the race.

Entering the Hooters 500, Petty entered qualifying with the possibility that he might not be able to start. Having used up all of his provisional race starts during the season, he would need to qualify on time. On his first lap, Petty managed the 36th fastest time. He elected to stand on that time and not run his second round qualifying attempt, hoping that he could outlast the other drivers who were otherwise not qualified. When qualifying concluded, Petty stood in 39th position, which was enough to get him into his final race. He started on the inside of the twentieth row.

Ceremonies to honor Petty were planned in the pre-race and post-race, and Petty was expected to take a ceremonial final lap around the track after the race to formally conclude his career. On the night before the race, Alabama held a concert honoring Petty at the Georgia Dome, with 45,000 in attendance.

On the night before pole qualifying, Richard Petty's cousin, longtime crew chief, and team manager Dale Inman was robbed at gunpoint in the parking lot of the Atlanta airport. The robber tried to grab a necklace from Inman's neck, but failed. He pointed his gun and pulled the trigger, but it did not fire, and no one was injured.

== Entry list ==
- (R) denotes rookie driver
- (CC#) denotes championship contender and where they rank in the standings

No.	Driver	Team/Owner	Manufacturer
1	Rick Mast	Precision Products Racing	Oldsmobile
2	Rusty Wallace	Penske Racing	Pontiac
3	Dale Earnhardt	Richard Childress Racing	Chevrolet
4	Ernie Irvan	Morgan-McClure Motorsports	Chevrolet
5	Ricky Rudd	Hendrick Motorsports	Chevrolet
6	Mark Martin (CC6)	Roush Racing	Ford
7	Alan Kulwicki (CC2)	AK Racing	Ford
08	Jeff Fuller	Bandzul Racing	Pontiac
8	Dick Trickle	Stavola Brothers Racing	Ford
9	Chad Little	Melling Racing	Ford
10	Derrike Cope	Whitcomb Racing	Chevrolet
11	Bill Elliott (CC3)	Junior Johnson & Associates	Ford
12	Jimmy Spencer	Bobby Allison Motorsports	Ford
15	Geoff Bodine	Bud Moore Engineering	Ford
16	Wally Dallenbach Jr.	Roush Racing	Ford
17	Darrell Waltrip	Darrell Waltrip Motorsports	Chevrolet
18	Dale Jarrett	Joe Gibbs Racing	Chevrolet
21	Morgan Shepherd	Wood Brothers Racing	Ford
22	Sterling Marlin	Junior Johnson & Associates	Ford
23	Eddie Bierschwale	B&B Racing	Oldsmobile
24	Jeff Gordon (R)	Hendrick Motorsports	Chevrolet
25	Ken Schrader	Hendrick Motorsports	Chevrolet
26	Brett Bodine	King Racing	Ford
28	Davey Allison (CC1)	Robert Yates Racing	Ford
30	Michael Waltrip	Bahari Racing	Pontiac
32	Jimmy Horton	Active Motorsports	Chevrolet
33	Harry Gant (CC4)	Leo Jackson Motorsports	Oldsmobile
41	Hut Stricklin	Larry Hendrick Motorsports	Ford
42	Kyle Petty (CC5)	SABCO Racing	Pontiac
43	Richard Petty	Petty Enterprises	Pontiac
45	Rich Bickle	TTC Motorsports Inc.	Ford
48	James Hylton	Hylton Motorsports	Pontiac
49	Stanley Smith	BS&S Motorsports	Chevrolet
50	Clay Young	Clay Young	Pontiac
52	Jimmy Means	Means Racing	Ford
55	Ted Musgrave	RaDiUs Motorsports	Ford
56	T. W. Taylor (R)	Willie Tierney	Pontiac
57	Bob Schacht	Stringer Motorsports	Oldsmobile
65	Jerry O'Neil	Aroneck Racing	Oldsmobile
66	Jimmy Hensley (R)	Cale Yarborough Motorsports	Ford
68	Bobby Hamilton	Tri-Star Motorsports	Oldsmobile
71	Dave Marcis	Marcis Auto Racing	Chevrolet
77	Mike Potter	Balough Racing	Chevrolet
80	Dave Blaney (R)	Hover Motorsports	Pontiac
82	Mark Stahl	Stahl Racing	Ford
83	Lake Speed	Speed Racing	Ford
85	Mike Skinner	Mansion Motorsports	Chevrolet
88	Mike Wallace	Owen Racing	Ford
90	Bobby Hillin Jr.	Donlavey Racing	Ford
91	Kerry Teague	Donlavey Racing	Ford
94	Terry Labonte	Hagan Racing	Oldsmobile

== Qualifying ==
=== Pole qualifying ===
The first round of qualifying was held on Friday November 13. Rick Mast won his first career pole position in the #1 Skoal Oldsmobile for Richard Jackson Racing, the last ever pole for Oldsmobile as General Motors was withdrawing the brand from NASCAR after the race. (Mast, Gant, and Bob Schacht fielded the only Oldsmobiles in the race.)

Mast recorded a qualifying speed of 180.183 miles per hour (289.976 km/h) was the first-ever NASCAR qualifying speed over 180 mph at an intermediate length circuit. Previously that speed had only been achieved at Daytona and Talladega. He was joined on the front row by Brett Bodine, driving the #26 Quaker State Ford for King Racing.

Under the rules at the time, the first round of qualifying locked in only the top twenty cars. In first round qualifying, all of the six championship contenders except for Harry Gant qualified. Mark Martin (4th) was the highest of the six contenders. Richard Petty was not among the top twenty. A field of 40 cars (plus at least one provisional) was expected to comprise the starting grid. With Petty sitting 36th-fastest after Friday's first round, he was precariously close to being bumped from the field on Saturday.

Locked-in cars
SP	No.	Driver	Speed
1	1	Rick Mast	180.183
2	26	Brett Bodine	179.900
3	3	Dale Earnhardt	179.664
4	6	Mark Martin	179.622
5	4	Ernie Irvan	179.481
6	94	Terry Labonte	179.387
7	8	Dick Trickle	179.346
8	15	Geoffrey Bodine	179.270
9	21	Morgan Shepherd	179.258
10	10	Derrike Cope	179.053
11	11	Bill Elliott	178.977
12	22	Sterling Marlin	178.883
13	83	Lake Speed	178.802
14	7	Alan Kulwicki	178.743
15	2	Rusty Wallace	178.586
16	5	Ricky Rudd	178.423
17	28	Davey Allison	178.400
18	12	Jimmy Spencer	177.937
19	41	Hut Stricklin	177.786
20	42	Kyle Petty	177.735

Failed to qualify in round 1
Pos.	No.	Driver	Speed
21	55	Ted Musgrave	177.677
22	25	Ken Schrader	177.665
23	66	Jimmy Hensley	177.625
24	17	Darrell Waltrip	177.602
25	30	Michael Waltrip	177.596
26	45	Rich Bickle	177.343
27	68	Bobby Hamilton	177.154
28	57	Bob Schacht	176.823
29	33	Harry Gant	176.657
30	16	Wally Dallenbach Jr.	176.646
31	24	Jeff Gordon	176.521
32	90	Bobby Hillin Jr.	176.339
33	18	Dale Jarrett	176.327
34	9	Chad Little	175.751
35	52	Jimmy Means	175.565
36	43	Richard Petty	175.318
37	88	Mike Wallace	174.781
38	71	Dave Marcis	174.458
39	23	Eddie Bierschwale	174.103
40	08	Jeff Fuller	173.579
41	65	Jerry O'Neil	173.140
42	49	Stanley Smith	173.102
43	56	T. W. Taylor	172.982
44	50	Clay Young	170.889
45	82	Mark Stahl	170.713
46	80	Dave Blaney	170.389
47	32	Jimmy Horton	167.329
48	77	Mike Potter	163.500
—	48	James Hylton	No speed
—	85	Mike Skinner	No speed
—	91	Kerry Teague	No speed

=== Second round qualifying ===
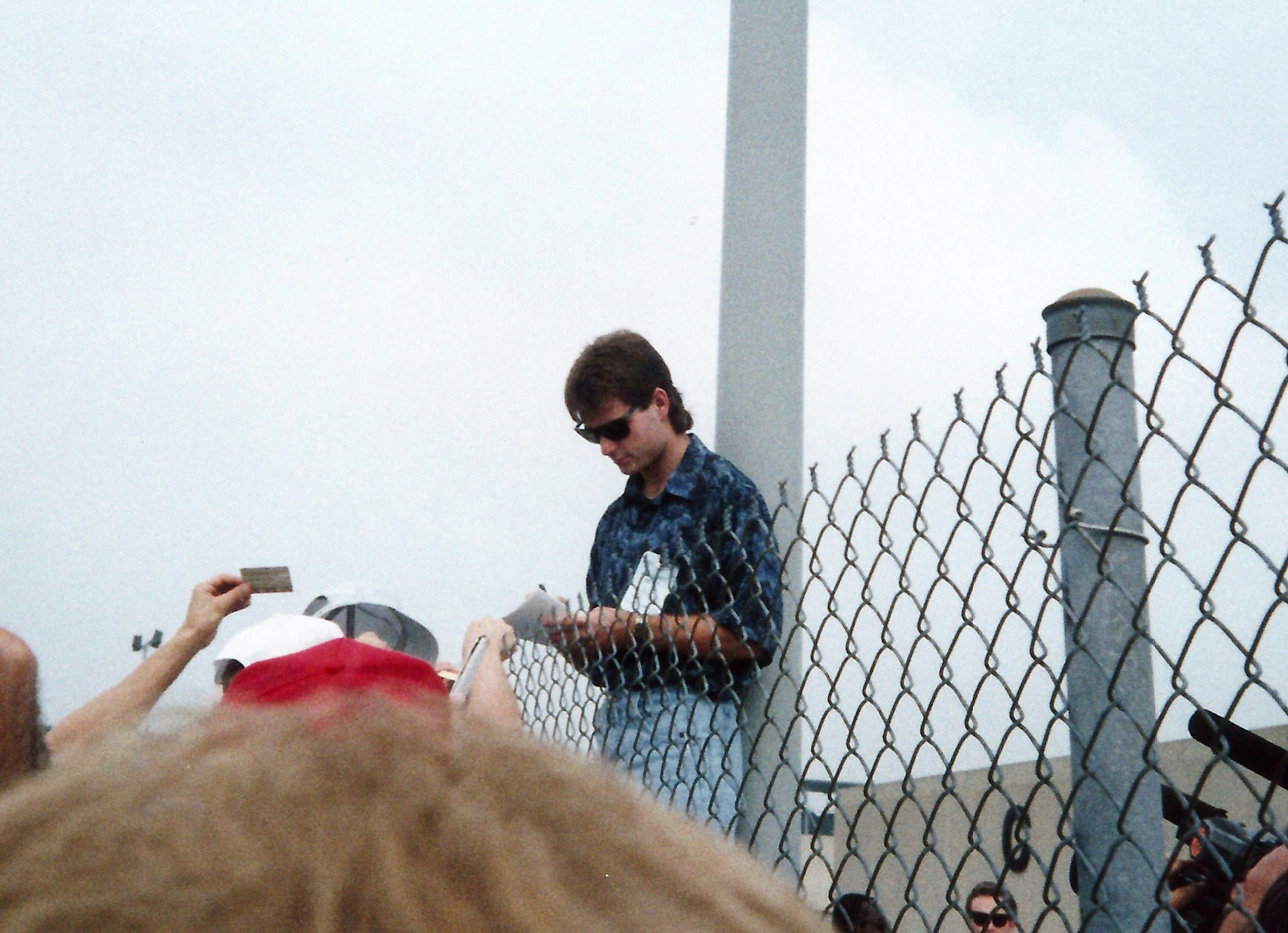
Rookie Jeff Gordon

Second round qualifying was held on Saturday November 14. Under the rules at the time, drivers who did not qualify during the first round moved on to second round qualifying. Each driver could elect to stand on his time from the first round, or erase their time and make a new attempt. Rookie Jeff Gordon bettered his time from the day before, and became the fastest qualifier of the second round. That entered him into the wild card drawing for the 1993 Busch Clash.

Most drivers stood on their times, including Richard Petty, who held on to qualify 39th. Jimmy Hensley elected to try again, and wound up losing eleven spots on the grid. Stanley Smith, who did not even make top 40 on Friday, made a big improvement, qualifying 33rd. Smith would make only one additional NASCAR start, suffering a career-ending crash at Talladega the following season. Jimmy Horton, who would find himself leaving the track entirely in Smith's Talladega crash, went from only 47th-fastest on Friday, to qualify 36th. Dave Marcis also stood on his time (174.458 mph), but slipped out of the top-40. He made the field via a provisional.

Qualifying cars
SP	No.	Driver	Speed
21	24	Jeff Gordon	177.735
22	55	Ted Musgrave	177.677*
23	25	Ken Schrader	177.665*
24	17	Darrell Waltrip	177.602*
25	30	Michael Waltrip	177.596*
26	45	Rich Bickle	177.343*
27	68	Bobby Hamilton	177.154*
28	57	Bob Schacht	176.823
29	33	Harry Gant	176.657*
30	16	Wally Dallenbach Jr.	176.646*
31	90	Bobby Hillin Jr.	176.339*
32	18	Dale Jarrett	176.327*
33	49	Stanley Smith	176.220
34	66	Jimmy Hensley	176.140
35	9	Chad Little	175.751*
36	32	Jimmy Horton	175.734
37	52	Jimmy Means	175.565*
38	88	Mike Wallace	175.318
39	43	Richard Petty	175.318*
40	23	Eddie Bierschwale	175.284
41	71	Dave Marcis	Provisional

*Stood on Friday time

Failed to qualify
No.	Driver
77	Mike Potter
80	Dave Blaney
85	Mike Skinner
91	Kerry Teague
82	Mark Stahl
48	James Hylton
50	Clay Young
65	Jerry O'Neil
56	T. W. Taylor
08	Jeff Fuller

== Race ==
=== Start ===
A record 160,000 fans, some with seats in temporary grandstands, arrived at Atlanta Motor Speedway to witness Richard Petty's final ride, and to watch the exciting championship battle. Country Western Band Alabama sang the national anthem, then Richard Petty's son Kyle along with his sisters gave Richard the command to fire his engine one final time, while Bruton Smith gave the command to the rest of the field. Before the start of the race, four Apache helicopters did a fly-by and circled the track to salute the field.

The green flag then flew with polesitter Rick Mast in the #1 Skoal Oldsmobile for Richard Jackson Motorsports and Brett Bodine in the #26 Quaker State Ford for King Racing, battling into turn one, with Bodine leading the first lap. On lap 2, the two cars tangled, and crashed in turn one. Dale Earnhardt, the defending series champion whose reign was ending that day and who was running third in his familiar #3 GM Goodwrench Chevrolet for Richard Childress Racing, slipped by, and took over the lead. Several other cars were collected in the crash, and five of the championship contenders got through unscathed. Davey Allison, however, slowed to avoid the crash, and was tagged from behind in the left rear by Hut Stricklin's #41 Kellogg's Ford. The left rear fender was badly bent, but did not puncture the tire. Allison stayed out on the track, and the crew would be able to bend the bodywork away from the tire on the next pit stop. The cars of Rich Bickle, Wally Dallenbach Jr., and Bob Schacht were also involved but sustained only minor damage and were able to continue.

During the caution, Mark Martin ducked into the pits to change all four tires, because he was afraid he ran over debris from the incident, as well as flat-spotting the tires when he locked up the brakes and slid sideways to avoid it.

=== Early race ===
Earnhardt and Ernie Irvan, driving the #4 Kodak Chevrolet for Morgan-McClure Motorsports, traded the lead for the first 60 laps. Championship contenders Elliott, Allison, and Kulwicki ran near the top 10, while Gant, Martin, and Kyle Petty ran near the back of the pack. Richard Petty worked up to 30th.

By lap 60, entering the first round of green flag pit stops, the highest running of the championship contenders was Elliott in fifth. With the leaders in for service, Michael Waltrip spun out in the Bahari Racing #30 Pennzoil Pontiac and brought out the caution. Earnhardt and several other front runners lost a lap after being stuck on pit road. After the cycle completed under caution, four of the top five positions were filled by championship contenders. Elliott assumed the lead with Kulwicki second, Martin fourth, and Gant fifth.

However, the first significant issue for the main championship contenders struck during the pit stops. The gearbox on the #7's transmission broke as Kulwicki tried to shift into first gear while exiting his pit stall. Thus, Kulwicki stalled on exit and had to get his crew to push him out of the box so he could get rolling. Fortunately for him, his engineering prowess and a recent incident enabled Kulwicki to adjust to at least minimize the potential issue.

Several races earlier, at the Mello Yello 500 at Charlotte, Kulwicki had the same gearbox issue that he had just experienced. To correct the issue, he upshifted into fourth gear and ran the remainder of the event in the highest possible gear. Kulwicki, who had qualified for that race on the pole, ended up running second with one of the faster cars on track that afternoon.

So, as he had at Charlotte, Kulwicki put the #7 in fourth gear and headed back out onto the track. On this day, the “Underbird” was running fast as well, so Kulwicki pressed on with the only concerns being the potential for slow pit stops and having to restart after cautions since the car could not climb through the gears as it normally would; in fact, even downshifting into second or third gear meant that pieces from the broken first gear could potentially cause damage to the transmission that might result in engine failure.

On lap 85, Bob Schacht stalled in turn 1 & another series of yellow flag pit stops had shuffled the field, bringing Allison to the lead. Martin took the lead on lap 91, which meant that now four of the championship contenders (Martin, Allison, Elliott, and Kulwicki) has secured five bonus points for leading a lap. Five of the six contenders were running well, with Gant running third behind Martin and Allison and Elliott and Kulwicki running in the top ten. Kulwicki's car was performing extremely well despite having to run in fourth gear all day, and once up to speed it was the fastest on the track. Kyle Petty, however, was not as fortunate. The #42 developed terminal engine trouble that took him out of contention for the championship (as he would have needed to win the race and get help) and would result in his finishing near the rear of the field, multiple laps down.

=== Richard Petty crash ===
On lap 95, the #25 Kodiak Chevrolet of Ken Schrader and the #8 Snickers Ford of Dick Trickle tangled on the frontstretch. The cars spun wildly to the inside. Darrell Waltrip's #17 Western Auto Chevrolet spun to avoid the crash, and ran into the #16 Keystone Beer Ford driven by Wally Dallenbach Jr. The #45 Terminal Trucking Ford of Rich Bickle was also collected, which led to Richard Petty running into him and destroying the front end of the car, breaking the oil cooler. The oil started a fire, and Petty's car coasted to the infield in flames. Petty (who was overheard on ESPN's in-car camera shouting to the rescue crews "Bring the fucking fire extingusher!") was uninjured, however the car was badly damaged, and his return to the race was in question.

At the 100 lap mark, Allison continued to hold the hypothetical lead in the points standings, with Kulwicki second, and Elliott close behind in third.

=== Jeff Gordon ===
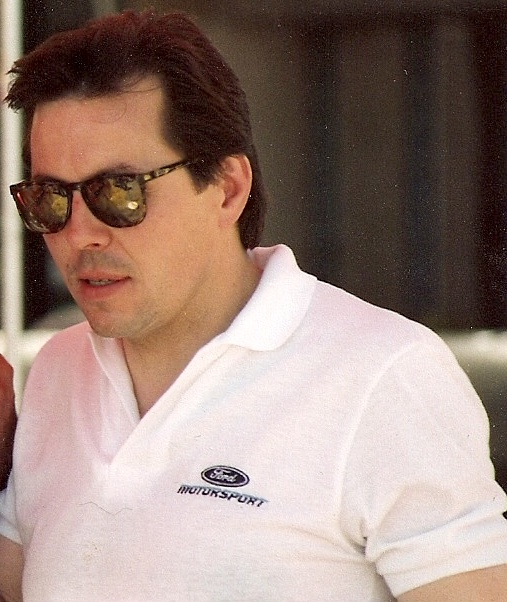
Alan Kulwicki

Around lap 118, rookie Jeff Gordon brought the #24 Chevrolet into the pits for service. The Ray Evernham-led "Rainbow Warriors" crew, which in later years would become famous for their pit stop efficiency, was nowhere near that level in this race and their errors caused Evernham to refer to them as the “Keystone Kops”. During the stop, a roll of duct tape was left on the trunk lid. As Gordon left, the roll of tape rolled onto the track.

As it so happened, the points leader was driving by and the tape hit the front air dam on the #28. This caused more fender damage and Allison, who was already battling issues stemming from the incident mentioned earlier, began falling back from second place. His crew was able to fix the damage under caution, however, and he kept running. Gordon would eventually crash out of the race on lap 164, finishing 31st.

== Second half ==
As the race neared its halfway point, three of the six championship contenders had seen their shots at claiming the Winston Cup fall victim to bad fortune. As mentioned above, Petty's engine troubles had made his championship chase moot. Gant, who had been running in the top three earlier in the race, found himself falling further and further off the pace as he battled his car and a case of influenza; he would eventually go multiple laps down to end his hopes at becoming the oldest champion in Cup Series history. Martin had led twice for a total of 47 laps, but on lap 160 the engine on the #6 failed and he was forced out of the event.

Elliott, meanwhile, had held the lead four separate times before passing Ernie Irvan on lap 167 to take the point again. He, Kulwicki, and Allison had all led laps to that point, and shortly after he took the lead for the fifth time he became the leader in laps led. Kulwicki was running in second behind Elliott, with Allison in seventh position despite his car troubles.

Earnhardt's crash on lap 204 brought the caution out for the fifth time and the first since Petty's crash. When the race resumed, Kulwicki needed only three laps to overtake Elliott and this time, once he got to the front, he managed to stay there for an extended period. However, it was not proving to be enough to make up enough distance between himself and Allison, who was running sixth as the cars crossed the starting line to complete lap 253; if Allison was able to hold that position or improve it over the final 75 laps, the championship would be his.

=== Lap 254 crash ===
An incident on lap 254, however, once again changed the complexion of the race. After trading the lead with Earnhardt earlier in the day, Irvan's #4 car was suffering from issues that caused him to lose three laps. He lost control of his Chevrolet exiting turn 4, just missing Terry Labonte's #94 Sunoco Oldsmobile, then came back up the track in front of Rusty Wallace in the #2 Miller Genuine Draft Pontiac and championship leader Allison.

Wallace was able to avoid Irvan but Allison was not. The #28 T-boned the #4, with both cars spinning out near the start/finish line. This time, the damage to the Havoline Ford was critical; Allison's steering column had broken in the collision along with a tie rod, and he was unable to drive the car away from the accident scene. Although the car was able to be towed back to the garage and repaired, and the crew was eventually able to do enough to get him back onto the track to finish the race, Allison's championship hopes were all but evaporated. His only chance now was to have some sort of catastrophic misfortune befall Elliott and Kulwicki that would have enabled him to finish within enough points of them to retain his lead in the standings at the checkered flag.

=== Finish ===
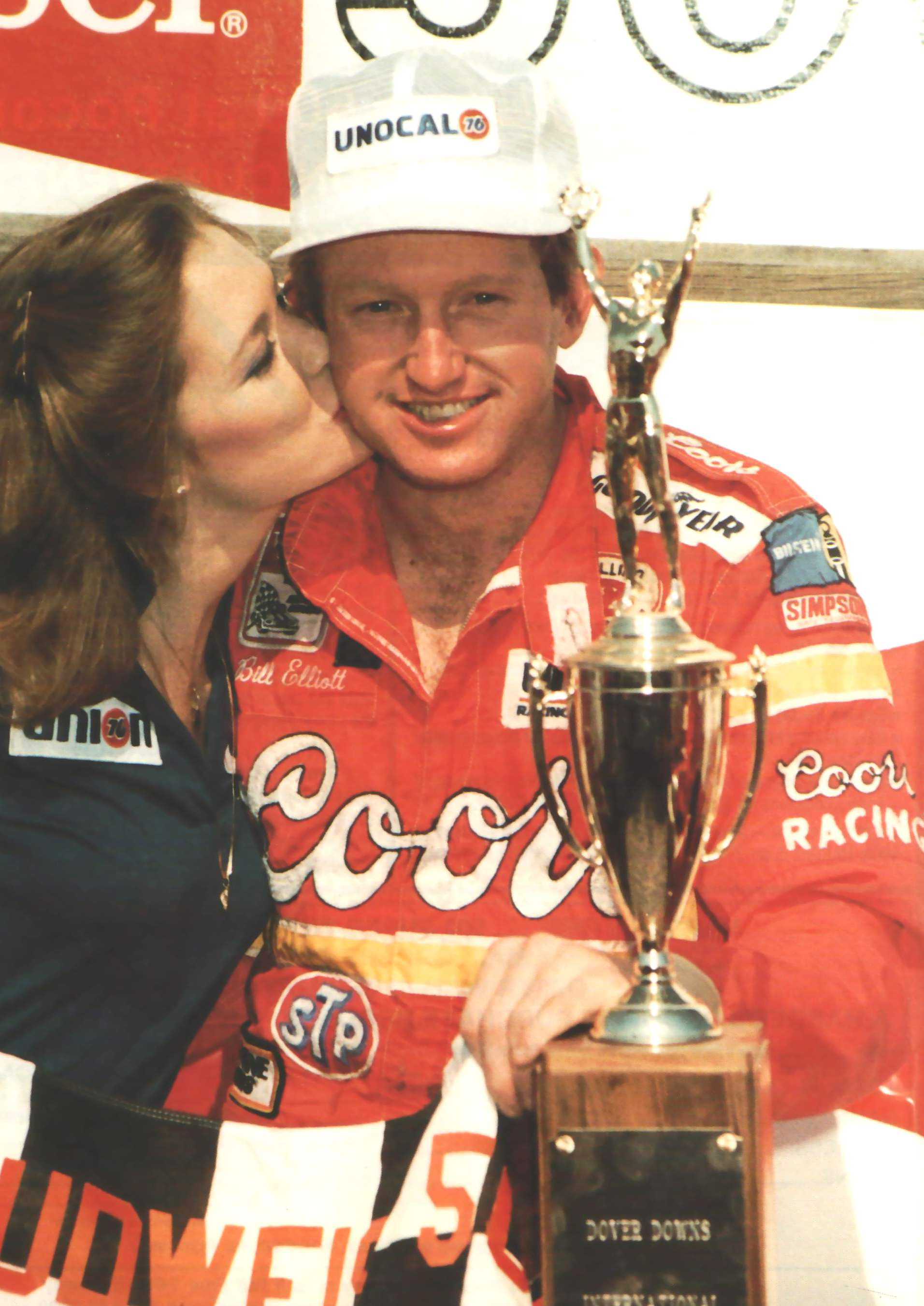
Bill Elliott

There were seventy-four laps remaining when the caution came out on lap 254. As they were running, Kulwicki was ahead of Elliott by fifteen points in the standings. Kulwicki's two major goals for the remaining distance were first, to keep himself near enough to Elliott to maintain his points lead regardless of whether he won the race or not, and second, to gain the five bonus points that were awarded to the driver who led the most laps over the course of the event.

However, Kulwicki was going to need to make at least one more pit stop before the end of the race, and with his gearbox issue he could not afford to lose time on pit road if something went wrong. He and crew chief Paul Andrews had considered pitting under the caution for a full load of fuel, but decided against this. Even if there would be the potential for caution periods later in the race, running seventy-four laps on a single tank was not likely to work out. It was eventually decided that the #7 would come in strictly for fuel on the last set of pit stops.

On lap 301, with Kulwicki still leading, Andrews told him to come into the pits on lap 306. However, word was relayed to the team that they were close to clinching the five point bonus for most laps led. Kulwicki stayed out, but was forced into conserving his fuel; this enabled Elliott to make up a two-second gap, which put him neck and neck with the #7. Despite Elliott's pushing, Kulwicki was able to hold off on his pit stop until lap 310, surrendering the lead after having been on point for a total of 103 laps.

Andrews called for half a can of gasoline to be put in the tank, and fuel man Tony Gibson and catch can man Peter Jellen stood in the pit stall waiting for their boss. The rest of the crew stood by just in case Kulwicki stalled again as he had earlier. After 3.4 seconds, Kulwicki took off and headed back onto the track. However, there was an issue with the fuel relay and Gibson could not be sure that he had gotten all of the fuel into the tank.

Kulwicki, once back up to speed, was running third, trailing Elliott and Terry Labonte. Elliott had a chance to tie Kulwicki for most laps led, which would give them both the bonus; to do this, he would need to lead all of the remaining laps, which would give him a total of 103 and equal Kulwicki. Tim Brewer, the crew chief for the #11, decided to make the same call that Andrews did for Kulwicki and called for Elliott to come in on lap 314. The stop went off with no trouble, unlike Kulwicki's, and took the same 3.4 seconds. Brewer, though, had not been apprised of where the #94 was running on the track when he called Elliott in; Labonte was thus able to lead lap 315 and deny Elliott a chance at tying Kulwicki. He then came in to pit himself, giving Elliott the lead back with Kulwicki taking second.

On lap 324, Andrews informed Kulwicki that he had clinched the most laps led bonus, but also that he needed to watch his fuel due to the relay system error on the pit stop. Since winning the race was no longer a possibility barring any unforeseen malady befalling the #11, Kulwicki’s goal was to make sure he did not get passed by the two cars running behind him, third place Geoff Bodine in Bud Moore Engineering's #15 Motorcraft Ford and fourth place Jimmy Spencer in Bobby Allison's #12 Raybestos Ford. Although Kulwicki was running ahead of both Bodine and Spencer, his fuel situation and gearbox issues were still concerns. If Kulwicki remained in second place, his point total for the race would equal Elliott’s and thus he would maintain the ten-point edge he had on the #9 entering the race. If he fell to third, he would still have a five-point margin over Elliott. If both Bodine and Spencer caught and passed Kulwicki, the Winston Cup would be lost as, if Kulwicki finished in fourth place, he would end the race tied with Elliott in the final standings and the first tiebreaker, wins, would go to the #11.

Elliott would end up leading the last thirteen laps of the race and crossed the line first, getting win number five on the season and a season sweep at Atlanta. Kulwicki was able to maintain his position and conserve enough fuel to make it to the checkered flag, and he crossed the line in second to secure the championship. The ten-point margin of victory was the closest in NASCAR history until the 2011 season when Tony Stewart and Carl Edwards finished in a tie for first place, with the championship going to Stewart due to him winning 5 races to Edwards' 1.

After taking one additional lap around the track, Kulwicki stopped in front of the flagstand and turned his car around. Then, as he had done in his first victory at Phoenix in 1988, he began driving around the speedway in a clockise (backwards) manner, a maneuver Kulwicki referred to as a "Polish victory lap", so he could wave to the fans. Kulwicki admitted after the race in his post-race and championship interview that he took his time coming down pit road on his final stop to make sure he didn't get a speeding penalty or stall the car again like he did on his first pit stop.

Richard Petty's crew worked diligently all afternoon to get his car running again, and with two laps remaining, Petty pulled out of the pits. His car had no sheet metal on the front end and no hood. He finished 35th, and was credited as running at the finish in his final race. Commenting on the fire, Petty said, "I wanted to go out in a blaze of glory; I just forgot about the glory part." After the victory lane celebration, Petty climbed in the car for one final ceremonial lap to salute the fans. He waved out the window while the song "Richard Petty Fans" by Alabama was played on the public address system.

Davey Allison lost forty-three laps while the #28 crew worked to get him back out onto the track. He crossed the line in 27th place and came home with a third place points finish, trailing Kulwicki by 63 and Elliott by 53.

Of the other contenders for the championship, Harry Gant finished the highest of them outside of Elliott and Kulwicki, finishing four laps down in thirteenth. Kyle Petty made it to lap 320 before his engine gave out, finishing sixteenth. Mark Martin's blown engine on lap 160 brought him home 32nd. They finished the race in the same positions in the standings that they entered in, with Gant finishing 123 points back of Kulwicki, Petty 133 back, and Martin 190 back.

Immediately after the race, Junior Johnson fired Tim Brewer as the crew chief for the #11. This would be the last serious championship opportunity for the veteran owner. Elliott stayed on for two more years, winning only one additional race in the #11 in 1994. Johnson would retire from NASCAR in 1995.

== Box score ==
Finish	Start	Car no.	Driver	Car make	Entrant	Laps	Status
1	11	11	Bill Elliott	Ford Thunderbird	Junior Johnson & Associates	328	Running
2	14	7	Alan Kulwicki	Ford Thunderbird	AK Racing	328	Running
3	8	15	Geoffrey Bodine	Ford Thunderbird	Bud Moore Engineering	328	Running
4	18	12	Jimmy Spencer	Ford Thunderbird	Bobby Allison Motorsports	328	Running
5	6	94	Terry Labonte	Chevrolet Lumina	Billy Hagan	328	Running
6	15	2	Rusty Wallace	Pontiac Grand Prix	Penske Racing South	328	Running
7	12	22	Sterling Marlin	Ford Thunderbird	Junior Johnson & Associates	327	Running
8	34	66	Jimmy Hensley	Ford Thunderbird	Cale Yarborough Motorsports	326	Running
9	22	55	Ted Musgrave	Ford Thunderbird	RaDiUs Racing	326	Running
10	32	18	Dale Jarrett	Chevrolet Lumina	Joe Gibbs Racing	326	Running
11	9	21	Morgan Shepherd	Ford Thunderbird	Wood Brothers Racing	325	Running
12	27	68	Bobby Hamilton	Ford Thunderbird	Tri-Star Motorsports	325	Running
13	29	33	Harry Gant	Oldsmobile Cutlass	Leo Jackson Motorsports	324	Running
14	25	30	Michael Waltrip	Pontiac Grand Prix	Bahari Racing	324	Running
15	10	10	Derrike Cope	Chevrolet Lumina	Whitcomb Racing	322	Running
16	20	42	Kyle Petty	Pontiac Grand Prix	Team SABCO	320	Engine
17	35	9	Chad Little	Ford Thunderbird	Melling Racing	320	Running
18	13	83	Lake Speed	Ford Thunderbird	Lake Speed	320	Running
19	40	23	Eddie Bierschwale	Oldsmobile Cutlass	Don Bierschwale	319	Running
20	38	88	Mike Wallace	Ford Thunderbird	Barry Owen	317	Running
21	37	52	Jimmy Means	Ford Thunderbird	Means Racing	317	Running
22	41	71	Dave Marcis	Chevrolet Lumina	Marcis Auto Racing	317	Running
23	24	17	Darrell Waltrip	Chevrolet Lumina	Darrell Waltrip Motorsports	307	Running
24	36	32	Jimmy Horton	Chevrolet Lumina	Active Motorsports	303	Running
25	16	5	Ricky Rudd	Chevrolet Lumina	Hendrick Motorsports	300	Engine
26	3	3	Dale Earnhardt	Chevrolet Lumina	Richard Childress Racing	299	Running
27	17	28	Davey Allison	Ford Thunderbird	Robert Yates Racing	285	Running
28	1	1	Rick Mast	Oldsmobile Cutlass	Richard Jackson Motorsports	253	Running
29	5	4	Ernie Irvan	Chevrolet Lumina	Morgan-McClure Motorsports	251	Crash FS
30	31	90	Bobby Hillin Jr.	Ford Thunderbird	Junie Donlavey	235	Engine
31	21	24	Jeff Gordon	Chevrolet Lumina	Hendrick Motorsports	164	Crash
32	4	6	Mark Martin	Ford Thunderbird	Roush Racing	160	Engine
33	28	57	Bob Schacht	Oldsmobile Cutlass	Doug Stringer	120	Ignition
34	26	45	Rich Bickle	Ford Thunderbird	Gene Isenhour	97	Crash
35	39	43	Richard Petty	Pontiac Grand Prix	Petty Enterprises	95	Running
36	23	25	Ken Schrader	Chevrolet Lumina	Hendrick Motorsports	94	Crash FS
37	7	8	Dick Trickle	Ford Thunderbird	Stavola Brothers Racing	94	Crash FS
38	30	16	Wally Dallenbach Jr.	Ford Thunderbird	Roush Racing	94	Crash FS
39	33	49	Stanley Smith	Chevrolet Lumina	Stanley Smith	60	Engine
40	2	26	Brett Bodine	Ford Thunderbird	King Racing	1	Crash T1
41	19	41	Hut Stricklin	Ford Thunderbird	Larry Hedrick Motorsports	1	Crash T1

=== Race statistics ===
- Time of race – 3:44:20
- Average speed – 133.322 mph
- Margin of victory – 8.06 seconds
- Lead changes – 20 among 9 drivers
- Total purse: US$785,787 (winner's share $93,600)

Lap leaders
Laps	Leader
1	Brett Bodine
2–16	Dale Earnhardt
17–31	Ernie Irvan
32–60	Dale Earnhardt
61	Geoff Bodine
62–72	Bill Elliott
73	Alan Kulwicki
74–79	Bill Elliott
80	Alan Kulwicki
81–82	Bill Elliott
83–85	Mark Martin
86–90	Davey Allison
91–134	Mark Martin
135–157	Bill Elliott
158–166	Ernie Irvan
167–209	Bill Elliott
210–310	Alan Kulwicki
311–314	Bill Elliott
315	Terry Labonte
316–328	Bill Elliott

Total laps led
Laps	Leader
103	Alan Kulwicki
102	Bill Elliott
47	Mark Martin
44	Dale Earnhardt
24	Ernie Irvan
5	Davey Allison
1	Geoff Bodine
1	Terry Labonte
1	Brett Bodine

Cautions: 7 for 45 laps
Laps	Reason
3–11	Crash, turn 1 (Mast, B. Bodine, Dallenbach, Stricklin, Bickle, Schact)
65–71	Spin, backstretch (M. Waltrip)
85–89	Schacht stalled in turn 1
96–103	Crash, frontstretch (Trickle, Dallenbach, D. Waltrip, Schrader, R. Petty, Bickle)
204–207	Crash, turn 2 (Earnhardt)
243–249	Engine failure (Hillin)
254–258	Crash, frontstretch (Irvan, Allison)

=== Selected awards ===
- Busch Pole Award: Rick Mast
- Busch Beer Fastest Second round Qualifier: Jeff Gordon
- Gillette Halfway Challenge: Ernie Irvan
- Goody's Headache Award: Davey Allison
- AP Parts Meet the Challenge Award:
- True Value Hard Charger Award: Bill Elliott
- Gatorade Circle of Champions Award: Bill Elliott
- Plasti-kote Winning Finish Award: Tim Brewer (Elliott)
- Western Auto Mechanic of the Race: Danny Glad (Kulwicki)
- Unocal 76 Challenge: $22,800 available to polesitter Rick Mast – not won (rollover)

=== Final points standings ===
1. Alan Kulwicki, 4078 points
2. Bill Elliott, −10
3. Davey Allison, −63
4. Harry Gant, −123
5. Kyle Petty, −133
6. Mark Martin, −191
7. Ricky Rudd, −343
8. Terry Labonte, −404
9. Darrell Waltrip, −419
10. Sterling Marlin, −475

== Legacy ==
This race is considered the transition from the old age of NASCAR to the new age. As veteran and 7-time champion Richard Petty retired, and the future 4-time champion Jeff Gordon made his cup series debut. This is also the only race in NASCAR history to feature Petty, Gordon, and Dale Earnhardt taking the green flag together. All three are considered among the best NASCAR drivers of all time. In total, nine former or future NASCAR Winston Cup champions drove in the race; Morgan Shepherd was a former Late Model Sportsman Series champion; and Mike Skinner (who failed to qualify) would eventually win the 1995 Truck Series championship – accounting for 11 NASCAR touring series champions entered in the event.

The race took place on the old "classic oval" configuration of Atlanta Motor Speedway. Later, Atlanta was re-configured to a quad-oval layout, and the start/finish line was moved to the old backstretch.

This was perhaps Junior Johnson's last hurrah as a team owner, as his cars never contended for a championship again. Elliott returned for the next two seasons, recording an eighth-place points finish in 1993 despite not winning a race, which was Johnson's last top ten finish in the points as an owner. The team won their final races in 1994, with Elliott scoring a victory at the Southern 500 and Jimmy Spencer winning the Pepsi 400 and DieHard 500. After that, Elliott left to form his own team and took Spencer's sponsor, McDonald's, with him, while Budweiser ended its relationship with the team to join Hendrick Motorsports. Johnson would bring in Brett Bodine for 1995, then sell the team to him outright following the season.

The 1992 season was also considered Dale Earnhardt's worst season of his career, finishing outside of the top ten in points, with only one win all season. He led the race early, but pitted at a yellow and fell a lap down. After battling back to the lead lap, he brushed the wall and finished 26th. He would bounce back in 1993 and 1994, winning the Winston Cup again in both years. This race was also the last that he would run with Kirk Shelmerdine as his crew chief; Andy Petree, who was Harry Gant's crew chief for this race, would take control in 1993 and guide Earnhardt to his next two championship runs.

Capping off the season with an 8th-place finish, Jimmy Hensley locked up the 1992 Rookie of the Year award. The rookie race for 1992 was mostly uncompetitive, however, as Hensley won by a large margin. All of the eligible rookies ran only partial schedules in 1992.

This was also the final race Dick Beaty served as the NASCAR director, as he retired after the 1992 season. It was also Eddie Bierschwale's final career start.

The race broke the existing ESPN auto racing television audience record, registering a 4.1 rating and 2.5 million households. It fell just short of ESPN's all-time auto racing rating record (4.2 rating/1.8 million households for the 1987 Winston 500).

Alan Kulwicki stood as the last owner-driver to win a series championship until Tony Stewart accomplished the feat in 2011. Like in 1992, the championship came down to the final race and was decided by a tiebreaker when Stewart won the race to tie Carl Edwards for the points lead and was awarded the title by virtue of his five victories versus Edwards' single victory.

Although Kyle Petty would finish fifth in the final standings again in 1993, he would not get as close as he was in 1992 again. Beginning in 1994, his career results began declining and he never finished in the top ten in Cup Series points again. He would record two more victories driving the #42, then left the team in 1997 to drive for his family’s operation where he would remain until his 2008 retirement.

Harry Gant never won another race after the 1992 season. He would drive the #33 Skoal Bandit for two more years, recording an 11th place finish in 1993 and a 25th place finish in 1994. After that, he retired from the Winston Cup, but would return for a one-off appearance in the 1996 Winston Select all-star race as a replacement for an injured Elliott. He also fielded his own #33 Chevrolet S/K in the NASCAR Craftsman Truck Series that year for eleven races, recording four top tens and a best finish of eighth, which he managed to do twice at Flemington and Richmond.

Mark Martin, meanwhile, had several more chances to become a series champion. 1993 was the first of seven consecutive seasons that he finished in the top five in the final points standings, with a pair of second place finishes. Martin would finish in second again in 1994, 1998, 2002, and 2009, but did not win the Cup before his retirement in 2013.

Since 1992, two additional father-son tandems have gone on to be Cup Series champions. In 1999, Dale Jarrett joined his father Ned as champion when he won the series championship driving for Robert Yates Racing. Then, in 2020, Chase Elliott joined father Bill as champion when he won the championship driving for Hendrick Motorsports.

== Tragedy strikes in 1993 ==
In 1993, two of the six principals in the Winston Cup chase in the Hooters 500 would meet tragic fates.

=== Alan Kulwicki ===
On April 1, 1993, as the Cup Series was getting ready for their first trip of two to Bristol for the season, Kulwicki and several Hooters executives were flying into Tri-Cities Regional Airport in Blountville, Tennessee from Knoxville, where Kulwicki had done a promotional appearance earlier in the day. On final approach, the plane crashed short of the runway, killing Kulwicki and everyone else on board. The next morning, the #7 was withdrawn from the event and, with a funeral wreath on its front grille, crew member and hauler driver Peter Jellen drove a few laps around the track before pulling out of the facility through an access gate.

Kulwicki's team carried on in his absence under the stewardship of Team SABCO owner Felix Sabates. As per Kulwicki's wishes, Jimmy Hensley took over the #7 while Sabates searched for a buyer while running his own team. After an attempt to get Loy Allen, Jr. into the car failed, Hooters pulled its sponsorship from the team. In May, Geoff Bodine purchased the team and brought along backing from The Family Channel, which sponsored the team for most of the rest of the season. At the time, Bodine was still driving the #15 for Bud Moore; he continued to do so while running the #7 team until the fall race at Dover, when he moved over to drive his new acquisition in place of Hensley.

As the defending Winston Cup champion, Kulwicki had earned an automatic berth into the International Race of Champions for 1993. He had participated in the first two events, finishing ninth at Daytona and eleventh at Darlington, before his death. Dale Earnhardt, who had not been invited to participate in the series for 1993 and had already substituted for an injured Al Unser Jr. in the Darlington event, was selected to replace Kulwicki for the remaining two races at Talladega and Michigan; his finishes of third and fifth gained Kulwicki a posthumous fifth place finish in the points.

=== Davey Allison ===
On July 12, 1993, the day after the inaugural race at New Hampshire, Allison was scheduled to observe David Bonnett, son of driver Neil, test a Busch Series car at Talladega. Allison, who had just acquired a helicopter, flew with his fellow racer Red Farmer to the track. While Allison, a licensed pilot, was trying to land the helicopter in a fenced-in area in the infield, he lost control and crashed. Neil Bonnett rushed to the scene and was able to free Farmer from the wreckage, but Allison had to be extricated and airlifted to a Birmingham, Alabama hospital where he died the next morning from massive head trauma sustained in the accident.

After Robby Gordon and Lake Speed drove the #28 in the immediate aftermath of Allison's death, Ernie Irvan left the #4 team to take over beginning at the 1993 Southern 500; he would win twice in the car before the year was out.

Like Kulwicki, Allison was invited to compete in the International Race of Champions. At the time of his death, he had participated in the first three rounds of the championship, having won the second round at Darlington. Entering the final race at Michigan, Allison had the lead in the standings with a 7.5 point lead over Al Unser Jr., who finished third in the Michigan event. Terry Labonte drove in place of Allison and finished sixth, which ensured Allison's posthumous championship.

=== Fifteenth anniversary ===
To commemorate the fifteenth anniversary of the race, Jeff Gordon served as grand marshal and Richard Petty the honorary starter for the 2007 Pep Boys Auto 500 that took place on October 28, 2007.

Previous race: 1992 Pyroil 500K	NASCAR Winston Cup Series; 1992 season	Next race: 1993 Daytona 500
