= Raymond Beadle =

American racing driver (1943–2014)

- Nationality: American
- Born: December 16, 1943 Spur, Texas, U.S.
- Died: October 20, 2014 (aged 70) Dallas, Texas, U.S.
- Retired: 1987 (as racer), 1990 (as owner)

NHRA Winston Drag Racing Series
- Years active: 1970s–1990
- Teams: Don Schumacher Racing; Blue Max Racing

Previous series
- IHRA

Championship titles
- 1979, 1980, 1981 1975, 1976, 1981: NHRA Funny Car Champion IHRA Funny Car Champion

Awards
- 2014: Motorsports Hall of Fame of America

Raymond Beadle (December 16, 1943 – October 20, 2014) was an American drag racer and auto racing team owner.

Beadle was perhaps best known as the driver and owner of the Blue Max Top Fuel funny car. Beadle won three consecutive NHRA Funny Car championships from 1979 to 1981 and three IHRA Funny Car championships, 1975–76 and 1981.

In NASCAR, Beadle owned a Winston Cup team from 1983 to 1990, winning the 1989 Winston Championship with driver Rusty Wallace. Beadle's car number was 27 and his car was usually a Pontiac.

Beadle also owned a World of Outlaws sprint car, driven by Sammy Swindell.

== Drag racing career ==
After joining Harry Schmidt's Blue Max team, Beadle rivaled "Jungle Jim" Liberman in popularity and Don Prudhomme in on-track success. By the end of his first year with the Max, Beadle won the NHRA U.S. Nationals Funny Car class, and by the end of the decade, he was the reigning world champion.

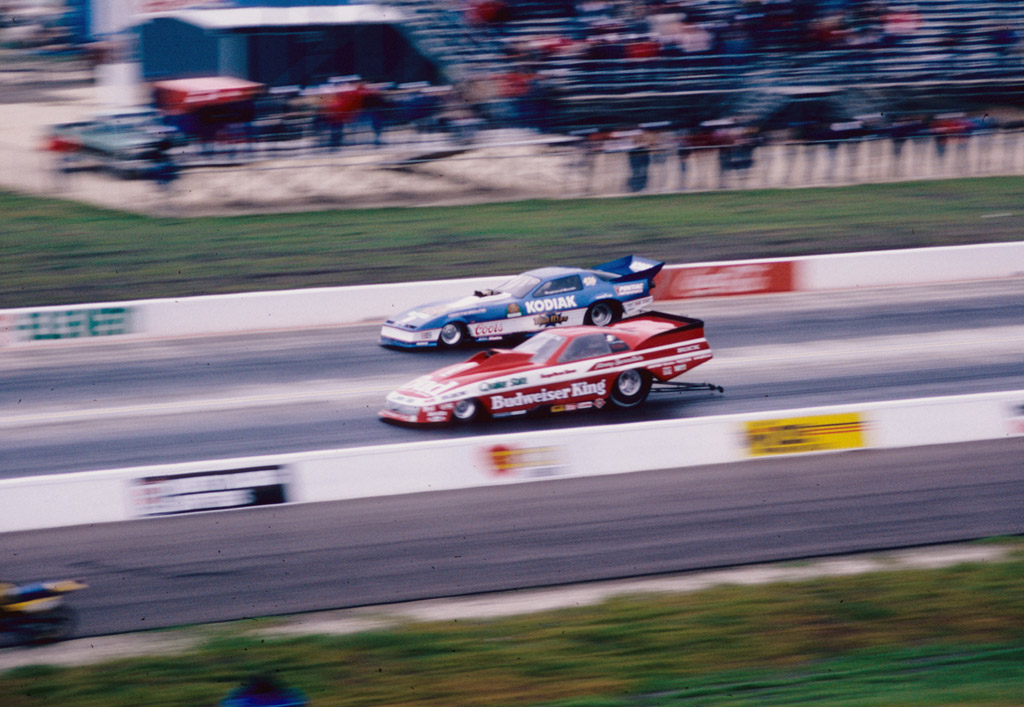
Beadle's funny car (rear), driven by Tom McEwen in 1987, facing off against Kenny Bernstein

Beadle never claimed to be a tuner, and Schmidt was not interested in driving, promoting, or worrying about the day-to-day business of racing. Beadle was. He had the Blue Max name copyrighted, lined up sponsors and race dates, and immediately demanded four times what Schmidt had commanded in appearance fees, and got it.

In 1975, the car had been Harry Schmidt's Blue Max, and in 1976, it said Beadle and Schmidt. The 1977 car, also a Ford Mustang II, was Beadle's alone, sponsored by English Leather and Napa Regal Ride.

Beadle won the NHRA championship in 1979 with two wins in five finals against Tom Hoover, Gary Burgin, Billy Meyer, a young John Force, and Jim Dunn. In 1980, he won in Columbus, Denver, and Seattle, was runner-up in Gainesville and Ontario, and defended the championship. In 1981, he won the title a third time, and again Prudhomme was second. The Blue Max, now a Plymouth Horizon, reached the final round four times in 1981 and again won NHRA's most prestigious event, the U.S. Nationals. Driving a Ford EXP in 1982, Beadle went after a fourth straight championship, but slipped to fifth in the points standings by year's end. In this period, Beadle also "set a new standard for apparel marketing to fans".

In 1983, Beadle won just once, at the Springnationals, and in 1984, he scored back-to-back wins, in Englishtown and Denver, with another blue Mustang Beadle put veteran "Lil' John" Lombardo in his red and blue Schlitz Blue Max in 1985, and Lombardo won the U.S. Nationals, defeating Dale Pulde's Miller High Life-sponsored Buick Regal and giving Beadle his last great win.

Beadle got back in the seat in 1987 and reached the final round of two races late that year. Richard Tharp, one of the car's original drivers when Schmidt owned the car, drove in 1988.

== NASCAR owner / Blue Max Racing ==
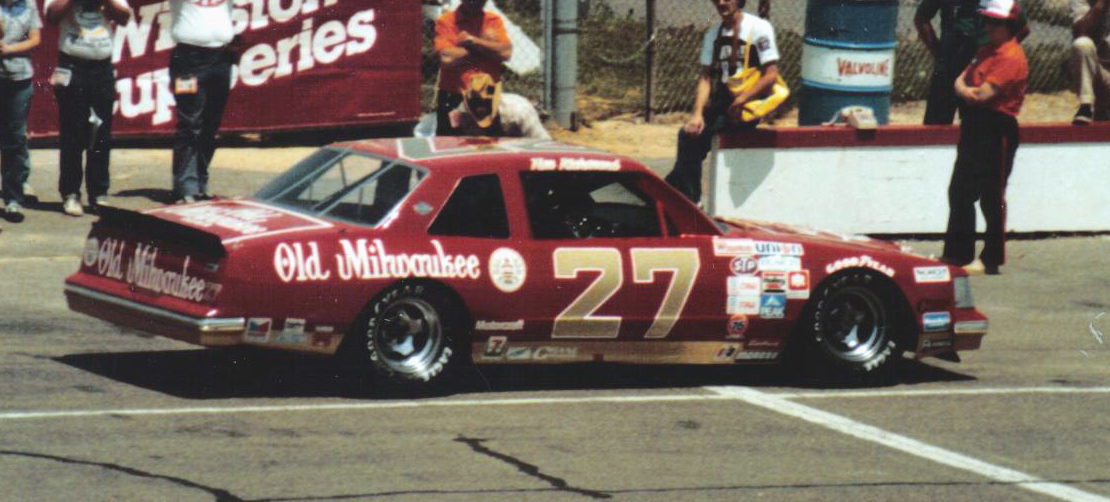
Tim Richmond driving Beadle's No. 27 car in 1983.

Beadle entered NASCAR Winston Cup as a team owner in 1983 by buying out the equipment of M. C. Anderson Racing, continuing with Anderson's No. 27 number. He started with sponsorship from Old Milwaukee beer and driver Tim Richmond. Mixed success followed for Beadle's Blue Max Racing team.

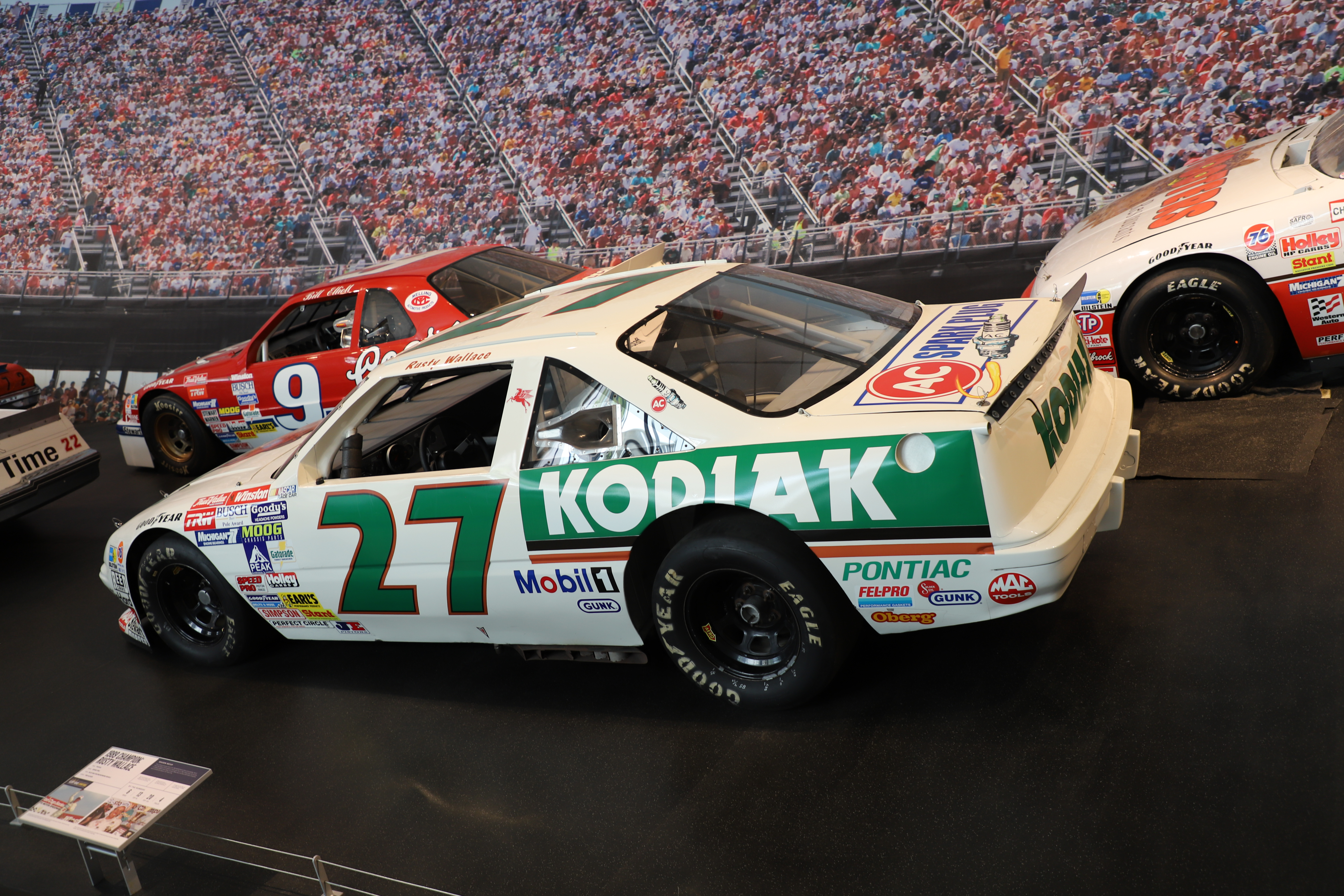
Rusty Wallace's 1989 Championship No. 27 car at the NASCAR Hall of Fame.

When Richmond moved to Hendrick Motorsports in 1986, Beadle picked up Rusty Wallace and sponsorship from Alugard Antifreeze and in 1987, they picked up Kodiak. Jimmy Makar served as the team's chassis specialist. In its penultimate year of operation, the team won the 1989 NASCAR Winston Cup Series championship. That year was reportedly marked with acrimony between Wallace and Beadle. However, Wallace remained under contract with the team for the 1990 season.

For 1990, the Kodiak sponsorship moved to Hendrick Motorsports to sponsor the No. 25, and the No. 27 was sponsored by Miller Genuine Draft beer. The four-year sponsorship deal was specifically tied to Wallace, meaning it went where the 1989 champion went as well. Wallace left the team at the end of the season. The team suspended operations and left the Cup Series at the end of the 1990 season. Roger Penske acquired their equipment and the car runs today as the Team Penske No. 2 car driven by Austin Cindric.

As the No. 27 won two races with Wallace in 1990, Beadle was eligible to participate as a winning team owner at The Winston in 1991. Because of this, Beadle struck a deal with team owner Dick Moroso to field the No. 27 Oldsmobile driven by Bobby Hillin Jr. for the exhibition race. Hillin finished the race 19th after experiencing engine valve issues.

== Post racing ==
Post racing, Beadle operated cattle ranches in West Texas and Arkansas, as well as a quarter horse farm near Valley View, Texas. He said he opened the ranch at least partially as a way to entertain sponsors while racing and bred grand champions at both.

=== NASCAR family connections ===
During the 1989 Championship, Beadle's car, with Rusty Wallace as a driver, battled the Richard Childress Racing car driven by Dale Earnhardt Sr. for the Cup title. Beadle and Earnhardt's sons are connected. Ryan Beadle, an attorney, is General Counsel for Dale Earnhardt Jr.'s motorsport operations, JR Motorsports. Tyler Reddick noted that during the Old Milwaukee throwback car announcement, crediting Ryan Beadle for negotiating the deal.

== Death ==
In July 2014, Beadle suffered a heart attack and underwent surgery to relieve artery blockages. Beadle died on October 20 of the same year.

== Awards ==
- Beadlóe was inducted into the Motorsports Hall of Fame of America in 2014
- Finalist for 2014 International Motorsports Hall of Fame
- Ranked 20th on the National Hot Rod Association Top 50 Drivers, 1951–2000
- Member of the 11th class of inductees into the International Drag Racing Hall of Fame
- 2006 recipient of the Bruton Smith Legends Award in the Texas Motorsports Hall of Fame
- American Auto Racing Writers & Broadcasters Association's All-American team in 1980
