= 1991 The Winston =

Seventh iteration of the NASCAR All-Star Race

Race details
- Race 2 of 2 exhibition races in the 1991 NASCAR Winston Cup Series
- Date: May 19, 1991
- Location: Concord, North Carolina
- Course: Charlotte Motor Speedway
- Course length: 1.5 miles (2.4 km)
- Distance: 70 laps, 105 mi (168.981 km)
- Weather: Temperatures around 64.0 °F (17.8 °C), with winds gusting to 14.96 miles per hour (24.08 km/h)
- Average speed: 168.75 mph (271.58 km/h)

Pole position
Driver	Davey Allison	Robert Yates Racing

Most laps led
Driver	Davey Allison	Robert Yates Racing
- Laps: 70

Winner
No. 28	Davey Allison	Robert Yates Racing

Television in the United States
- Network: CBS
- Announcers: Ken Squier and Ned Jarrett

The 1991 edition of The Winston was a stock car racing competition that took place on May 19, 1991. Held at Charlotte Motor Speedway in Concord, North Carolina, the 70-lap race was an exhibition race in the 1991 NASCAR Winston Cup Series. Davey Allison of Robert Yates Racing won the pole and led all 70 caution-free laps to win the race and collect a total purse of US$325,000.

== Background ==
Charlotte Motor Speedway, the track where the race was held.

The 1991 All-Star Race was open to race winners from last season through the 1991 Winston 500 at Talladega Superspeedway. The format was changed where only the winning drivers and teams of the 1990 season and the 1991 season to the point were awarded exemptions. In return, the field, which would still be 20 cars, would be filled by the top finishers in the All-Star Open, a new rule where the field will be filled until the field reaches 20 cars.

Geoff Bodine was eligible for this race, but had to bow out due to an injury he sustained in a practice crash prior to the event. As a result, his eligibility was given to Tommy Ellis. Likewise, Kenny Wallace substituted for Kyle Petty, who was injured in a crash at the Winston 500. Bobby Hillin Jr., who had not won a race since 1986, made the field after his team Moroso Racing struck a deal with Blue Max Racing, which was eligible after former driver Rusty Wallace won two races in 1990.

=== 1991 The Winston drivers and eligibility ===
==== Race winners in 1990 and 1991 ====
- 2-Rusty Wallace (3 wins from 1990 and 1991)
- 3-Dale Earnhardt (11 wins from 1990 and 1991)
- 4-Ernie Irvan (2 wins from 1990 and 1991, including the 1991 Daytona 500)
- 5-Ricky Rudd (2 win from 1990 and 1991)
- 6-Mark Martin (3 wins in 1990)
- 7-Alan Kulwicki (1 win in 1990)
- 9-Bill Elliott (1 win in 1990)
- 10-Derrike Cope (2 wins in 1990, including the 1990 Daytona 500)
- 15-Morgan Shepherd (1 win in 1990)
- 17-Darrell Waltrip (1 win in 1991)
- 25-Ken Schrader (1 win in 1991)
- 26-Brett Bodine (1 win in 1990)
- 28-Davey Allison (2 wins in 1990)
- 33-Harry Gant (2 wins from 1990 and 1991)

==== Winning team owners in 1990 and 1991 ====
- 11-Junior Johnson & Associates with substitute driver Tommy Ellis (3 wins in 1990 with Geoff Bodine)
- 27-Blue Max Racing/Moroso Racing with new driver Bobby Hillin Jr. (2 wins in 1990 with Rusty Wallace)
- 42-SABCO Racing with substitute driver Kenny Wallace (1 win in 1990 with Kyle Petty)

==== Top three finishers of The Winston Open ====
- 12-Hut Stricklin (finished third)
- 22-Sterling Marlin (finished second)
- 30-Michael Waltrip (finished first)

== Race summary ==
=== Segment 1 (50 laps) ===
Davey Allison won the pole, earning him US$75,000 in advance. Michael Waltrip, Sterling Marlin, and Hut Stricklin made the starting grid by finishing in the top three at The Winston Open. Alan Kulwicki retired on lap 7 after his engine expired while Bobby Hillin Jr.'s day ended on lap 26 with valve issues. Segment 1 ended with Allison taking the checkered flag while leading all 50 laps.

Race 1 results

1. 28-Davey Allison (US$50,000)
2. 17-Darrell Waltrip
3. 25-Ken Schrader
4. 9-Bill Elliott
5. 33-Harry Gant

=== Segment 2 (20 laps) ===
Allison led the field on the second segment. Prior to the green flag, Ken Schrader stopped twice in the middle of the track before returning to the field. NASCAR initially gave Schrader the black flag, but rescinded it when his team explained that his safety belt suddenly came undone and he needed to buckle it back up. Morgan Shepherd was given a stop-and-go penalty after jumping the green flag, resulting in him finishing in the tail end of the lead lap. As Allison extended his lead, Schrader overtook Darrell Waltrip to advance to the second spot while Bill Elliott, Ernie Irvan, and Michael Waltrip engaged in a three-way battle for fourth. With a lead of over one second ahead of Schrader and rain beginning to hit the track, Allison crossed the finish line to win the race and US$200,000, becoming the second flag-to-flag winner of The Winston after Dale Earnhardt in 1990.

Race results
Pos	Grid	Car	Driver	Owner	Manufacturer	Laps run	Laps led
1	1	28	Davey Allison	Robert Yates Racing	Ford	70	70
2	6	25	Ken Schrader	Hendrick Motorsports	Chevrolet	70	0
3	3	17	Darrell Waltrip	Darrell Waltrip Motorsports	Chevrolet	70	0
4	7	9	Bill Elliott	Melling Racing	Ford	70	0
5	16	4	Ernie Irvan	Morgan–McClure Motorsports	Chevrolet	70	0
6	18	30	Michael Waltrip	Bahari Racing	Pontiac	70	0
7	10	2	Rusty Wallace	Penske Racing	Pontiac	70	0
8	20	12	Hut Stricklin	Bobby Allison Motorsports	Buick	70	0
9	2	33	Harry Gant	Jackson Motorsports	Oldsmobile	70	0
10	4	3	Dale Earnhardt	Richard Childress Racing	Chevrolet	70	70
11	11	5	Ricky Rudd	Hendrick Motorsports	Chevrolet	70	0
12	19	22	Sterling Marlin	Junior Johnson & Associates	Ford	70	0
13	13	6	Mark Martin	Roush Racing	Ford	70	0
14	5	11	Tommy Ellis	Junior Johnson & Associates	Ford	70	0
15	8	15	Morgan Shepherd	Bud Moore Engineering	Ford	70	0
16	15	26	Brett Bodine	King Racing	Buick	69	0
17	17	42	Kenny Wallace	SABCO Racing	Pontiac	69	0
18	9	10	Derrike Cope	Whitcomb Racing	Chevrolet	50	0
19	14	27	Bobby Hillin Jr.	Blue Max Racing/Moroso Racing	Oldsmobile	26	0
20	12	7	Alan Kulwicki	AK Racing	Ford	7	0
