= Davey Allison =

American racing driver (1961–1993)

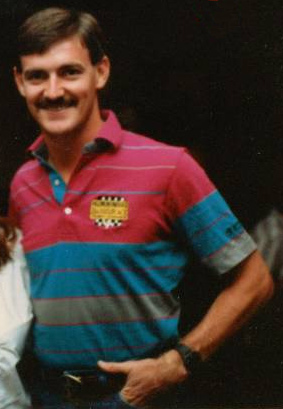
- Allison at Pocono Raceway
- Born: David Carl Allison; February 25, 1961; Hollywood, Florida, U.S.
- Died: July 13, 1993 (aged 32); Birmingham, Alabama U.S.
- Cause of death: Helicopter crash
- Achievements: 1992 Daytona 500 winner 1991 Coca-Cola 600 winner 1987, 1989, 1992 Winston 500 winner 1991, 1992 The Winston winner 1984 ARCA Talladega Super Car Series Hoosier Superspeedway Challenge Winner; 1993 IROC Champion (posthumously)
- Awards: 1984 ARCA Talladega Super Car Series Rookie of the Year; 1987 Winston Cup Series Rookie of the Year; Named one of NASCAR's 50 Greatest Drivers (1998); NASCAR Hall of Fame (2019); Named one of NASCAR's 75 Greatest Drivers (2023)

NASCAR Cup Series career
- 191 races run over 9 years
- Best finish: 3rd (1991, 1992)
- First race: 1985 Talladega 500 (Talladega)
- Last race: 1993 Slick 50 300 (Loudon)
- First win: 1987 Winston 500 (Talladega)
- Last win: 1993 Pontiac Excitement 400 (Richmond)
Wins	Top tens	Poles
19	92	14

NASCAR O'Reilly Auto Parts Series career
- 86 races run over 10 years
- Best finish: 29th (1986)
- First race: 1983 Coca-Cola 200 (Rockingham)
- Last race: 1993 Havoline 250 (Milwaukee)
Wins	Top tens	Poles
0	31	2

ARCA Menards Series career
- 37 races run over 6 years
- Best finish: 3rd (1984, 1985)
- First race: 1980 Gould Prix 150 (Michigan)
- Last race: 1986 Talladega ARCA 500K (Talladega)
- First win: 1983 Talladega ARCA 500 (Talladega)
- Last win: 1985 Atlanta ARCA 500K (Atlanta)
Wins	Top tens	Poles
7	23	5
- Statistics up to date as of May 24, 2018.

David Carl Allison (February 25, 1961 – July 13, 1993) was an American NASCAR driver. He was best known for driving the No. 28 Texaco-Havoline Ford for Robert Yates Racing in the NASCAR Cup Series. Born in Hollywood, Florida, he was the oldest of four children born to Bobby and Judy Allison. The family moved to Hueytown, Alabama, and along with Bobby Allison's brother, Donnie, Red Farmer and Neil Bonnett, became known as the Alabama Gang.

== Early career ==
Growing up, Allison participated in athletics, preferring football, but settled upon automobile racing. He began working for his father's NASCAR Winston Cup Series team after graduating high school, and built a race car of his own, a Chevy Nova, with friends known as the "Peach Fuzz Gang." He began his career in 1979 at Birmingham International Raceway and won his first race in his sixth start. He became a regular winner at BIR, and by 1983 was racing in the Automobile Racing Club of America (ARCA) series. Allison won two ARCA events at his home track, Talladega Superspeedway, in 1983, and was named ARCA Rookie of the Year in 1984, placing second in the series title. That same year he married his first wife, Deborah.

Allison continued racing in the ARCA series in 1985, winning eight races in the series, four at Talladega Superspeedway. He competed in some of NASCAR's lower divisions. In the Busch series, his crew chief was Red Farmer. In July 1985, car owner Hoss Ellington gave Allison an opportunity to drive a NASCAR Winston Cup Series car in the Talladega 500. Allison qualified 22nd In Ellington's Chevrolet and finished tenth in his first Winston Cup start. The wins earned Allison more NASCAR Cup Series opportunities in 1986, when he made four starts in the No. 95 Sadler Racing Chevrolet entry with Tom Pistone serving as crew chief. Allison later substituted for injured racer Neil Bonnett in Junior Johnson's No. 12 Budweiser Chevy, starting and finishing seventh in the Talladega 500.

== NASCAR ==
=== Early Winston Cup career ===
Prior to the 1987 season, car owner Harry Ranier tapped Allison to replace veteran driver Cale Yarborough in the Ranier-Lundy No. 28 Ford Thunderbird. Yarborough was leaving the Ranier-Lundy team to start his own operation along with the team's sponsor, Hardee's. Ranier negotiated a sponsorship deal with Texaco's Havoline motor oil brand, a deal that was signed during the NASCAR edition of Speedweeks at Daytona International Speedway. On qualifying day, Allison signaled that he was in Winston Cup to stay when he qualified an unmarked, but Texaco-Havoline painted No. 28 Thunderbird second for the 1987 Daytona 500, becoming the first rookie ever to start on the front row for NASCAR's most prestigious event. A pit miscue which allowed a rear tire to fall off on the track ended his hopes of a good finish in the race, but success for Davey Allison would be just around the corner.

May 3, 1987 would become an infamous day in NASCAR history. Earlier in the week, Bill Elliott had qualified his No. 9 Coors-Melling Ford Thunderbird at a record 212.809 mph (a record which still stands today) for the Winston 500 at the unlighted Talladega Superspeedway. Allison would qualify third, while father Bobby would start second alongside Elliott in the Stavola Brothers No. 22 Miller Buick. On lap 22 of the event, Bobby Allison ran over a piece of debris, cutting his right-rear tire. The car turned sideways, lifted into the air, became airborne, and crashed vertically into the frontstretch spectator fence near the start finish line. The car landed back on the track and collected a number of other competitors. Davey was ahead of his father at the time and saw the crash unfold in his mirror. Bobby Allison was not injured, but the crash slightly injured several spectators and the race was red-flagged for two hours and thirty-eight minutes. It was this event that triggered the requirement of smaller carburetors, and later, carburetor restrictor plates on engines at Daytona and Talladega to reduce the top speeds.

When the race resumed, Allison continued to run up front and when Elliott exited the race with engine failure, his toughest competition was eliminated. With darkness falling during a late caution flag, the decision was made to end the race ten laps short of its 188 lap distance. Running second on the restart, Allison passed leader Dale Earnhardt on the backstretch and pulled away for his first Winston Cup win. In winning the race, Allison became the first rookie since Ron Bouchard in 1981 to win a Winston Cup event.

Allison would better that feat just 28 days later by winning the Budweiser 500 at Dover International Speedway (then the Dover Downs International Speedway), becoming, at the time, the only rookie to win two Winston Cup events. In all, Allison started 22 of the 29 Winston Cup races in 1987, winning twice, and scoring nine top-five and ten top-ten finishes. He also won five poles in his rookie season.

The 1988 season started with much promise. Allison again started outside the front row for the Daytona 500, the first modern day race utilizing the NASCAR-mandated carburetor restrictor plate. While father Bobby was battling up front early in the race, Allison and his team struggled with a car that was repaired during the early morning hours following a crash in the final practice session. As the race came to a conclusion, Davey found himself running second, just behind his father. Bobby Allison would go on to hold off his son and win his third Daytona 500. Father and son would celebrate their one-two finish in victory lane.

Allison would struggle through much of the first half of the 1988 season as he ran some of the Winston Cup short tracks for the first time. The team was also suffering from engine failures and now sole-owner Harry Ranier was looking to sell the team. Crew chief Joey Knuckles was fired and engine builder Robert Yates replaced him. Then on June 19, at Pocono International Raceway came his father's near-fatal, career-ending crash.

With his father clinging to life in a Pennsylvania hospital, Allison raced on but failed to finish the next three events. The team rebounded when the series returned to Pocono in July with Allison scoring a third-place finish. Back at Talladega, the No. 28 Ford again suffered engine failure but Allison would drive his father's car later in the race when relief driver Mike Alexander was overcome by heat. Two races later, Allison would score his first win of the season at Michigan International Speedway. The win changed the fortunes for the financially strapped team and after a series of top-five and top-ten finishes, Allison would win the inaugural race at the new Richmond International Raceway. On October 1, 1988, Ranier sold the team to Yates, who temporarily remained as Allison's crew chief for the balance of the season, before undertaking full ownership. The rest of the season was a mixed bag but Allison would finish the season with a third place finish at Phoenix International Raceway, and a second at the season ending Atlanta Journal 500 at Atlanta Motor Speedway. He would finish eighth in the final Winston Cup standings. But the roller coaster 1988 Winston Cup season had taken a toll on Allison's marriage and he and Deborah quietly divorced during the offseason.

=== Initial years with Robert Yates Racing (1989–1990) ===
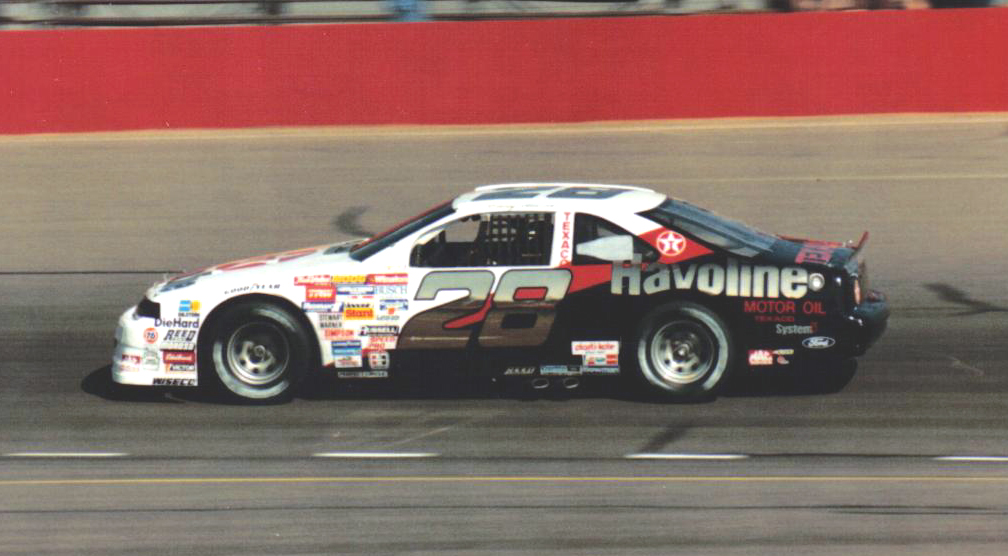
Allison's 1989 car

Allison's 1989 season did not start well. A year after he and his father's one-two Daytona 500 finish, Davey started at sixteenth, then was involved in an early incident with Geoff Bodine that sent his car careening into the sand bar separating the track's backstretch from Lake Lloyd. The car made one slow, complete, roll-over with Allison eventually restarting the car and driving it back to the pits. He drove the damaged, hood-less car to a 25th place finish and had a heated exchange with Bodine following the race (the first of several exchanges with other drivers during his career).

The team rebounded at Rockingham and when the series moved to Talladega in May for the Winston 500, Allison had scored one top-ten and three top-five finishes. Allison started on the pole at Talladega and got his first win of 1989, his second victory in Talladega's spring event. After the race, Allison stood sixth in the Winston Cup Championship standings, but did not win again until the next restrictor plate race, the Pepsi 400 at Daytona, his last win of the season. By the end of the season, Allison had collected seven top-five and thirteen top-ten finishes along with one pole position to go with the two wins. He slipped to eleventh in the final Winston Cup standings. However, he would marry his second wife, Liz, during the season, and their first child, Krista, was born prior to the 1990 season.

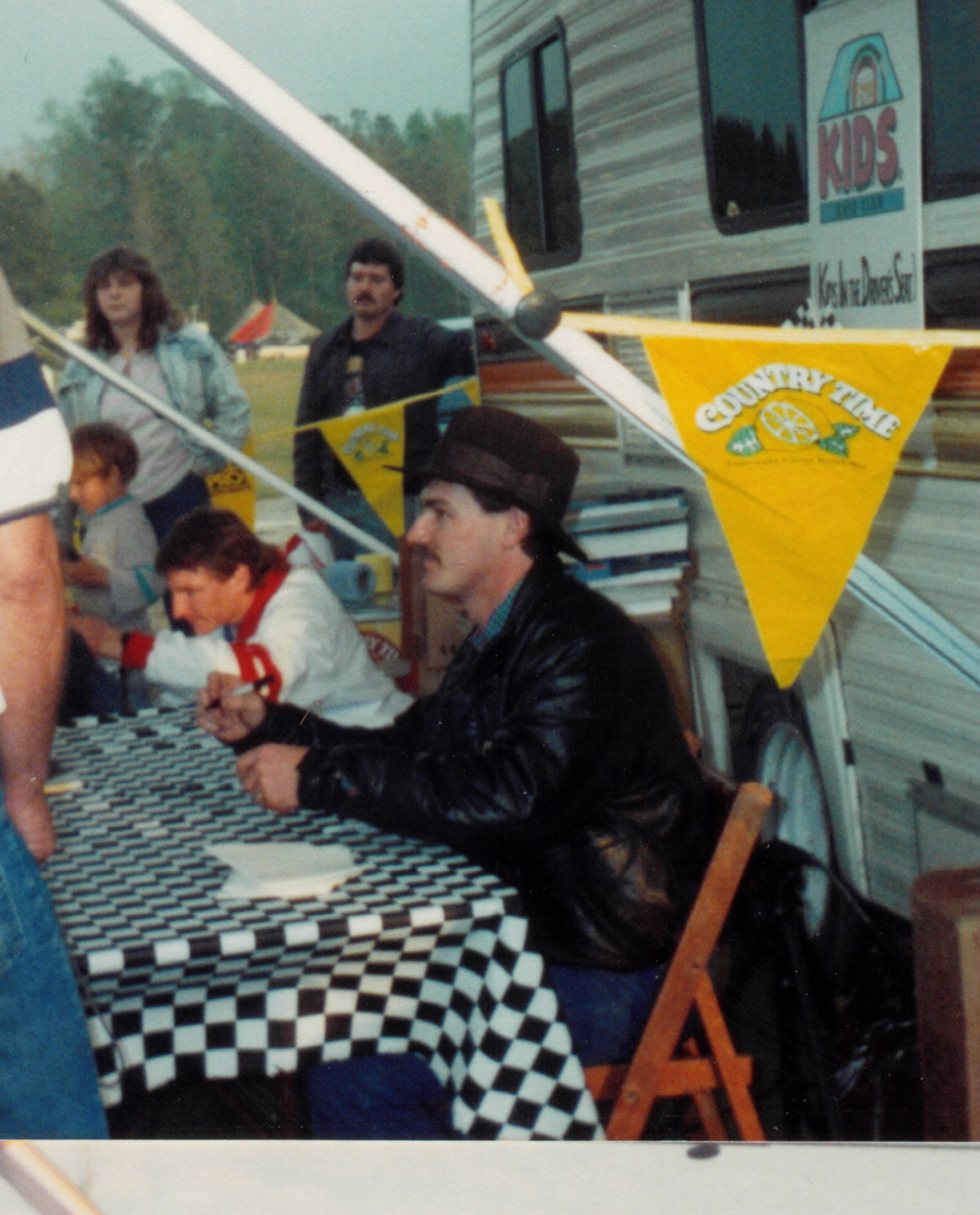
Allison signing autographs

The 1990 season did not start much better than the 1989 season and by the sixth race at Bristol, Allison was a seventeenth in the Winston Cup standings. A poor qualifying run had the team pitting in the backstretch pits, which usually doomed a team's chances of winning the race. But the team owner decided against pitting on the final caution flag and Allison scored his second short-track win in a thrilling photo-finish with Mark Martin, winning by just eight inches. But the win did not change the team's fortunes and after an ill-handling car at Dover required Allison to ask for relief from fellow Alabama driver Hut Stricklin, Robert Yates decided to hire "Suitcase" Jake Elder as the team's crew chief. Allison won the fall event at Charlotte Motor Speedway but finished the season 13th in the final Winston Cup standings. He again posted two wins, but only five top-five and ten top-ten finishes.

=== Larry McReynolds' hiring (1991) ===
The 1991 season began with much promise. Allison won the pole for the Daytona 500 and was in contention for the win until the final laps. After a late race restart, eventual winner Ernie Irvan passed Dale Earnhardt for the lead. Allison tried to follow Irvan around Earnhardt but could not make the pass and the two drivers battled side by side for a few laps. As the cars came off turn two, Earnhardt's car spun, collecting Allison and Kyle Petty. He was unable to continue and finished fifteenth. From there, things went downhill. Allison finished twelfth at Richmond, sixteenth at Rockingham, then crashed hard early in the Motorcraft 500 at Atlanta, finishing fortieth. He was openly feuding with crew chief Elder, and Allison threatened to quit the team if Elder stayed. After the poor result at Atlanta, Robert Yates decided that he had to make a change at crew chief.

Elder was fired, and Larry McReynolds was hired away from the Kenny Bernstein team to replace him. In his first race with McReynolds at the helm, Allison finished second at the 1991 Transouth 400. A third place finish followed at Bristol, then a sixth at North Wilkesboro and an eighth at Martinsville. The team finished 22nd at Talladega due to a large accident triggered by Ernie Irvan but there was no doubt the team was much improved and was destined for bigger things.

Two weeks later, Allison dominated The Winston all-star race at Charlotte, and continued his domination by winning the Coca-Cola 600 the following week, leading 263 of the race's 400 laps. Two races later, he won his first road course event at then Sears Point International Raceway where he was awarded the victory after Ricky Rudd was penalized by NASCAR for spinning Allison out on the final lap. He won again at Michigan then finished third in the Pepsi 400 at Daytona. At the halfway point of the 1991 season, Allison had climbed to fifth in the Winston Cup point standings.

After finishing fourteenth at Pocono, the series moved to Talladega. As the race wound down, Allison aimed for yet another win behind leader Dale Earnhardt. But he was unable to get drafting help from fellow Ford Motor Company drivers, and he slipped to ninth place after attempting to pass Earnhardt for the lead. In his post-race interview, Allison stated "All we needed was three inches to clear Earnhardt, when you can't get help from a fellow Ford driver, that's pitiful." In a fit of rage after the race, Allison punched a wall in the team's transporter, breaking his wrist. The injury failed to slow him down, however, as he finished a remarkable tenth on the road course at Watkins Glen, then was second at Michigan, a photo-finish, in which Dale Jarrett scored his first Winston Cup victory. Allison scored back-to-back victories at Rockingham and Phoenix and entered the final race at Atlanta second in the Winston Cup standings. But a dead battery in that race relegated him to a seventeenth place finish, dropping him to third in the final standings, only four points behind Ricky Rudd. Dale Earnhardt won the championship. The final tally of the 1991 season for Allison; five wins, twelve top-five and sixteen top-ten finishes, and three pole positions. It was also during the 1991 season that he and Liz welcomed their second child, a son, Robert Grey Allison. With Larry McReynolds at the helm, Allison entered the 1992 season as a legitimate championship contender.

=== 1992 ===
Statistically, 1992 was Allison's best season in Winston Cup racing. he started sixth in the 1992 Daytona 500 but was probably not quite as fast as the Junior Johnson teammates of Bill Elliott and Sterling Marlin. But the race would change dramatically on lap 92 when Elliott, Marlin, and Ernie Irvan triggered a multi-car crash at the front of the pack. Fourteen cars were eliminated, but Allison—and eventual runner-up Morgan Shepherd—somehow made it through the mess. He would dominate the event, lead 127 laps to join his father as a Daytona 500 winner. Allison was also the only driver to lead the Daytona 500 at halfway and go on to win, until Denny Hamlin won the 2016 race.

Bill Elliott would rebound to win the next four events, but Allison was not far behind in each event, posting four top-five finishes to maintain his lead in the points. A hard crash in the Food City 500 at Bristol left him with a bruised shoulder, and the following weekend the team had Jimmy Hensley on hand for relief just in case Allison could not go the distance. Allison managed to race through the pain and go the distance, winning at North Wilkesboro after beating Rusty Wallace and Geoff Bodine off pit road with a fast pit stop and leading the remaining laps en route to victory. Another hard crash at Martinsville re-injured his ribs, but Allison rebounded yet again, leading a contingent of Fords to victory in the Winston 500 at Talladega using the same car with which he won the Daytona 500. This would be Allison's third victory at Talladega. The win also put him in position to win the Winston Million if he could finish off the "small slam" with a win in either the Coca-Cola 600 at Charlotte, or the Southern 500 at Darlington.

Next up was The Winston all-star race. One year removed from his domination of that event and the Coca-Cola 600, Allison was ready to take the spotlight again. But this time around, there was more focus on the event itself. Over the winter, the Musco Lighting company had installed a state-of-the-art lighting system at then Charlotte Motor Speedway. Billed as "One Hot Night" by The Nashville Network, which was to broadcast the event, The Winston was the first superspeedway race to be held under the lights. Allison would drive the same car that he used to dominate the event one year earlier, affectionately known as "007."

In the final, ten-lap segment of the race, Dale Earnhardt led, followed by Kyle Petty and Allison. In the third turn on the final lap, Petty got under Earnhardt's car and the GM Goodwrench Chevrolet spun. Davey took advantage of this and jumped into the lead. But Petty charged back and as Davey crossed the start-finish line to win the race, the two cars came together, sending the driver's side of Davey's car hard into the outside wall in a shower of sparks. An unconscious Allison was taken from his car and airlifted to a Charlotte hospital. The crash left him with a concussion, bruised lung, and a battered and bruised body.

His car, "007," was totaled. Allison would later claim to have sustained an out-of-body experience after the crash. He claimed to have awoke to see his crashed car below him as he rose away from it, and to have turned his attention away from the frantic work of the emergency workers to a bright light above, which faded and left him in darkness until he awoke later in the hospital. McReynolds stated during the FOX telecasts that the first words from Allison when he awoke in the hospital were "Did we win?" McReynolds told Allison "Yes, Davey, we won." Victory celebrations went on even though the driver was not present, and all of the crew members later went to the hospital to be with their driver.

The wreck did not deter Allison. He finished fourth in the Coca-Cola 600 the following week despite the injuries and maintained his points lead. He then finished 11th at Dover, 28th at Sears Point, and fifth at Pocono. Still hanging onto the points lead, and his body healing, Davey won the pole and dominated the Miller Genuine Draft 400 at Michigan, leading 158 of the race's two-hundred laps. The first half of the season ended with Davey posting a tenth place finish in the Pepsi 400 at Daytona. At the halfway point of the season, Allison had a 46-point lead over second place Bill Elliott and a 134-point lead over third place Alan Kulwicki, and had held the points lead since the first race of the season, despite the injuries and setbacks.

That would all change as the series went back to Pocono. Allison won the pole for the event and led 115 of the first 149 laps. But a lengthy pit stop during a caution flag sent him to the middle of the pack. On lap 150, Allison was charging back through the pack, followed closely by Darrell Waltrip. The two cars made contact and Allison went sliding into the grass off Pocono's "tunnel turn." The car went airborne and began a series of violent flips before landing on top of an infield guardrail. Miraculously, Allison survived the crash. He was airlifted to the hospital with a severe concussion, along with a broken arm, wrist, and collar bone. His 33rd-place finish left him nine points behind Bill Elliott for the series title, but that seemed insignificant at the moment. Especially traumatizing was the fact that Pocono was the site of Davey's father Bobby's career-ending crash a few years earlier (see above). In fact, many worried fans wondered if the younger Allison's career was over.

Allison arrived at Talladega the following week wearing dark shades to hide eyes severely bruised in the Pocono crash, Allison famously told a reporter asking to see his eyes at the press conference, "You can see it, but its ugly." His arm was in a cast that allowed him to drive, and velcro attachments to his glove and the car's shifter knob helped him drive with less exertion, but Bobby Hillin Jr. would relieve Allison after the initial laps of the DieHard 500. Under NASCAR rules, the driver who takes the green flag is the one assigned to the points for all drivers that drive that car during the race. Hillin drove the No. 28 Texaco-Havoline Ford Thunderbird to a third-place finish at Talladega, helping Allison and the team keep pace with Elliott. The team was a strong contender for the win until suffering a jack failure on a pit stop. The following week, veteran road racer Dorsey Schroeder would relieve Allison, but he could only manage a twentieth place finish.

With his body healed enough to allow him to drive an entire race, Allison headed to Michigan where he had dominated the track's earlier event. But tragedy struck as the Michigan events began. While practicing for the weekend's Busch Series race, Davey's younger brother, Clifford crashed hard in the third and fourth turns of Michigan International Speedway. He would die en route to the hospital. Allison drove to a fifth place finish in the Champion Spark Plug 400, then went home to Hueytown for Clifford's funeral. The following weekend, he crashed again at Bristol, finishing thirtieth. Although still in second place in the Winston Cup standings, he now trailed leader Bill Elliott by 109 points.

Allison's chance to win the Winston Million was up next as the series headed to Darlington for the Mountain Dew Southern 500, which was worth both a million dollar bonus if he could win the Small Slam, but moreover, become the fourth driver to win the Career Grand Slam. There was a promotion for the event as fake Million Dollar Bills were printed with Allison's face on them were handed out for fans. He led 72 laps of the event and was in contention to win, but soon after the leaders pitted for tires and fuel, rain halted the race with 69 laps left. Instead it was Darrell Waltrip, gambling that the rains would come, did not pit and was leading the race when it was red flagged. He was declared the winner as darkness fell and the rains continued. Waltrip, who had long feuded with the entire Allison clan (Bobby and Donnie; ironically, Waltrip had replaced Donnie Allison with the DiGard team in 1975 and was a relief driver for one of Donnie's wins at Talladega), sat next to his car on pit road in lawn chair and held a colorful umbrella, gleefully joking that the rain shower was worth "one million dollars" to him as he became the fourth driver to finish a Career Grand Slam. (This was the second time Waltrip prevented a driver from clinching a Small Slam; in 1985, he stopped Bill Elliott's 1985 run at a Small Slam at Charlotte and Elliott has yet to win that leg of the Grand Slam; Elliott would take the Small Slam at Darlington in September; Dale Earnhardt stopped Waltrip's Small Slam and Career Grand Slam attempt three years previously at Darlington.) Davey finished fifth and was now 119 points behind Elliott, who finished third.

Allison and Elliott continued their drive for the championship after Darlington as the two kept pace with each other. But beginning with the Goody's 500 at Martinsville on September 28, Elliott's hold on the points lead began to slip. He finished thirtieth in that event while Allison finished sixteenth. Then at North Wilkesboro, Allison posted an eleventh place finish, while Elliott finished 26th. Back at Charlotte, Allison finished a nineteenth, but Elliott finished thirtieth and there were now four drivers within 100 points of Elliott, with those being Allison, Alan Kulwicki, Mark Martin, and Harry Gant. Martin and Kulwicki finished first and second respectively at Charlotte, and Kulwicki was continuing a late season charge. Three races prior to Charlotte, Kulwicki had crashed and finished 34th at Dover leaving him 278 points behind Elliott and in fourth place in the standings.

Elliott's skid stopped temporarily at Rockingham where he finished fourth. Allison finished tenth and Kulwicki twelfth and entering the final two races of the 1992 season, he was seventy points behind Elliott in second, with Kulwicki 85 points behind in third. But Allison's fortunes changed dramatically at Phoenix as he won the event by beating his closest rivals off of pit road, and Elliott finished 31st. Allison now had the points lead for the first time since his violent Pocono crash, and was 30 points ahead of Kulwicki, and forty ahead of Elliott, who had slipped to third in the standings. Also in contention to win the championship as the series moved to the final race at Atlanta were Harry Gant (fourth place, 97 points behind), Kyle Petty (fifth place, 98 points behind), and Mark Martin (sixth place, 113 points behind).

The 1992 Hooters 500 would be a milestone race in NASCAR Winston Cup history. It would be the final race of Richard Petty's career, as well as the first for future Winston Cup Champion Jeff Gordon. Couple that with the closest championship race in history, and the race was destined to be a classic. Allison entered the race needing only to finish fifth or better to win the Winston Cup. A first lap incident involving Rick Mast caused minor damage to Allison's car, and he battled through much of the race to stay in the top ten.

Meanwhile, Elliott and Kulwicki were staging a battle for the ages, battling for and swapping the lead through much of the event. Late in the race, Allison had finally managed to reach the top five and was in position to win the championship when Ernie Irvan lost control of his car on the frontstretch on lap 286. He could not avoid Irvan's spinning car and plowed into the No. 4 Kodak Chevrolet Lumina. Allison's tumultuous 1992 season was over, his championship hopes lost as Elliott and Kulwicki finished first and second in the race respectively. Kulwicki, an independent driver who had turned down offers to drive for other teams, including Junior Johnson, won the championship by leading one more lap than Elliott (103 to 102).

=== 1993 ===
Though 1992 had been a heartbreaking year for Allison and the Robert Yates Racing team in more ways than one, they had to be encouraged by their run for the championship. But 1993 opened on a sour note with Allison finishing 28th at Daytona. That finish was followed by a sixteenth at Rockingham, but Allison rebounded to win at Richmond the following week. The next race at Atlanta was delayed a week by a blizzard that blanketed much of the Southeast. Morgan Shepherd won the race and Davey finished thirteenth. He then posted an eleventh at Darlington. Despite the early season struggles, Allison was sixth in the Winston Cup standings, while defending series champ Kulwicki was ninth.

Allison had debuted in the International Race of Champions (IROC) in 1992, but his injuries forced him to miss the last two races.

Three days after Kulwicki's death in an airplane crash, Allison finished fifth in an emotional race at Bristol. He followed that finish with a fourth at North Wilkesboro, second at Martinsville, seventh at Talladega, and fifteenth at Sears Point. He finished a thirtieth in the Coca-Cola 600 at Charlotte, but rebounded at Dover, finishing third. He was sixth at Pocono, but finished 35th at Michigan and 31st at Daytona. Halfway through the 1993 season, he was fifth in the point standings, but was 323 points behind leader Dale Earnhardt. Still, Allison and the Robert Yates team were confident that they could put their early season struggles and inconsistency behind them and could make a run for the championship in the second half. The inaugural race at New Hampshire International Speedway proved the team's optimism was not unfounded. Allison led 38 laps of the event and finished third behind Rusty Wallace and Mark Martin.

== Death ==
On July 12, 1993, Allison boarded his newly acquired Hughes 369HS helicopter to fly to Talladega Superspeedway to watch family friend Neil Bonnett and his son David Bonnett test a car for David's Busch Series debut. Hut Stricklin was to have flown with him but he was recovering from being unwell at New Hampshire. Instead Davey picked up family friend and racer Red Farmer en route to the track. Allison was attempting to land the helicopter inside a fenced-in area of the track infield when the craft nosed up suddenly, then crashed. Neil Bonnett freed Farmer from the wreckage, but Allison was unresponsive and could not be freed until paramedics arrived. Farmer went on to a lengthy but successful recovery, but Allison never regained consciousness after sustaining a critical head injury. He was pronounced dead at 7:00 a.m. the next morning by a neurosurgeon at Carraway Methodist Medical Center in Birmingham after a procedure to relieve pressure on his brain proved unsuccessful.

In January 1994, Allison's estate filed a lawsuit against McDonnell Douglas claiming the cause of the crash was a failure of the collective socket on the helicopter. The lawsuit sought $25 million and was filed on behalf of Davey Allison Racing Enterprises, Tommy Allison as Executor of Davey Allison's estate, and Red Farmer. Birmingham attorney Jim Thompson presented evidence from a metallurgist showing that the cast metal piece contained air pockets and paint inside the part, claiming "that meant the part was defective the day it left the factory." A test pilot reconstruction showed identical results to Allison's crash. The suit called the socket a "totally failed magnesium part."

In their March 1995 report, the National Transportation Safety Board (NTSB) blamed the crash on Allison's inexperience in helicopters, coupled with the decision to attempt a downwind landing. It blamed the crash on a "poor in-flight decision to land downwind in a confined area that was surrounded by high obstructions" The board also listed Allison's "failure to properly compensate for the tailwind condition" as a likely crash cause. Furthermore, NTSB investigator Rolf Sasser said, "there was no indication of failure of that socket prior to the accident. There was no evidence of any fatigue failure. In fact, the failure of that socket would not be consistent with the loss of control that we found and witnesses stated that occurred."

In August 1995, a judge ruled against the Allison estate in their lawsuit against McDonnell-Douglas. The cause of the accident was not established and not considered important to the outcome of the case. The judge's ruling was based upon the evidence that shoulder harnesses that came in the helicopter from the manufacturer had been removed at some point. Testimony from a biomechanics expert established that Allison would not have died, and Farmer would not have sustained his injuries, had they been wearing shoulder harnesses originally provided in the helicopter, relieving the manufacturer of liability.

In a 2003 interview, Jim Thompson said McDonnell-Douglas settled the suit in 1996 for an undisclosed amount without admitting fault. Both Thompson and attorneys for McDonnell-Douglas stated they were prohibited by the court from discussing the settlement.

Thousands packed the auditorium at St. Aloysius Church in Bessemer, Alabama, to pay their respects at his funeral. His organs except his corneas were donated. Allison was buried wearing one of his black Texaco firesuits and wearing a racing hat. Fellow drivers attending the funeral included Mario Andretti, Roger Penske, Mark Martin, Darrell Waltrip, and Bill Elliott. Governor Jim Folsom Jr. made a brief visit and ordered the flags in Alabama lowered to half-mast. Some members of the band Aerosmith attended the service at St. Aloysius. Police estimated 2,000 people attended the funeral service. The procession of cars on the way to the cemetery stretched five miles long. People parked their cars on Interstate 20 and stood on the highway overpass to watch the procession. He is buried near his brother, Clifford, in Bessemer's Highland Memorial Gardens. Four jet fighters flew over the cemetery in formation. At the gravesite, country singer Joe Diffie performed his song Ships That Don't Come In, Allison's favorite song.

Journalist Paul Finebaum compared the large-scale mourning done by Alabama to the death of Bear Bryant in 1983. "Not since that sad week a decade ago has this state responded to a tragedy in such an overwhelming fashion."

After the final race of the season, series champion Dale Earnhardt and race winner Rusty Wallace drove a side-by-side Polish Victory Lap carrying flags for fallen drivers Alan Kulwicki and Allison. In his short NASCAR Winston Cup career, Allison posted 19 wins, 66 top-five finishes, and 92 top-ten finishes. He also won 14 poles and earned $6,724,174. He was survived by his wife, Liz, and two children: daughter Krista Marie and son Robert "Robbie" Grey.

== Tribute ==
Ten years after Allison's first win, Texaco debuted the throwback Battlestar paint scheme in his memory. It ran two races, but in the second, at the 1997 DieHard 500 in October, Ernie Irvan put the throwback Battlestar on the pole. Later, Texaco would often use the throwback paint scheme for their drivers at the track until they discontinued sponsorship.

The R. K. Allen Oil Company, the Talladega-based distributor for Texaco in the area, remembered the legacy of Allison with the Talladega-Texaco Walk of Fame at Davey Allison Memorial Park in Talladega, where fans vote drivers, past and present, to a specially themed "hall of fame" for drivers. The event took place until 2013. While Davey himself is not on the Walk, instead having the entire park dedicated to his memory, his brothers Donnie and Bobby were among the inaugural inductees, along with Red Farmer and Neil Bonnett, who had both survived the helicopter crash. Bonnett's induction was posthumuous, though, as he died in a crash during practice at Daytona International Speedway on February 11, 1994.

City manager Seddrick Hill of Talladega reinstated the Walk of Fame in 2022.

=== Talladega Walk of Fame members ===
Note: From 1994 to 2003, two drivers were inducted in the inactive driver category. From 2003 to 2012, one inactive driver was voted, unlike the past. Since 2013, the Talladega Walk of Fame Board of Directors has nominated one driver when necessary. The Board of Directors also inducted an active driver in 2000.

Year	Person	
2023	Ryan Blaney	
2022	Clint Bowyer	
2013	Jeff Burton	
Year	Active driver	Inactive drivers
2012	Brad Keselowski	Bill Rexford
2011	Ryan Newman	Speedy Thompson
2010	Kasey Kahne	Jim Paschal
2009	Morgan Shepherd	Jack Smith
2008	Bobby Labonte	Rex White
2007	Matt Kenseth	Terry Labonte
2006	Tony Stewart	Rusty Wallace
2005	Kevin Harvick	Herb Thomas
2004	Kyle Petty	Fonty Flock
2003	Dale Earnhardt Jr.	Fred Lorenzen
2002	Mark Martin	Red Byron; Bobby Isaac
2001	Ricky Rudd	Buck Baker; Joe Weatherly
2000	Bobby Hamilton; Darrell Waltrip	Fireball Roberts; Tim Flock
1999	Jeff Gordon	Harry Gant; Lee Petty
1998	Bill Elliott	David Pearson; Junior Johnson
1997	Dale Jarrett	Ned Jarrett; Buddy Baker
1996	Ernie Irvan	Alan Kulwicki; Cale Yarborough
1995	Dale Earnhardt	Richard Petty; Benny Parsons
1994	Board Vote Only	Bobby Allison; Donnie Allison; Neil Bonnett; Red Farmer

Notes

- The Walk of Fame induction was moved from July to October in 1997, and was in September in 2003.
- Hamilton was voted by fans to the Walk of Fame in 2000; the Board of Directors did not want the retiring Waltrip, whose 84 wins was the most by a driver who started his career after 1972 (when the schedule was reduced to the current format) to be inducted as an inactive driver, so he was automatically inducted by the board. It should be known Waltrip was very unpopular at Talladega in his prime for his feuds with all three Allisons, starting when he replaced Donnie in the DiGard racing car in 1975; ironically, it was Waltrip who was a relief driver driving when Donnie won the 1977 Talladega 500. Also, Waltrip's associate sponsor was the Havoline brand of oil from 1993 to 1997 (co-branding with Sears) and again in 1999-2000 (Texaco was associated with Kmart-sponsored cars fielded by Carl Haas, with both Newman-Haas Racing in CART and Haas-Carter Racing in 2000). In the 2010s, Waltrip's daughter Sarah Kaitlin graduated from Samford University in the Birmingham area; coincidentally, Davey Allison's widow and children moved shortly after his death to the Nashville area where Waltrip lives, where son Robert Grey graduated from Middle Tennessee State University.
- The Board of Directors of the Talladega-Texaco Walk of Fame inducted the inaugural class by decree in 1994.

== Legacy ==
Allison was leading the IROC series championship at the time of his death, with one race remaining in the four race series. Terry Labonte drove the final race in place of Allison and secured the championship for him. His championship money, $175,000, was set up as a trust fund for his children. Allison finished 31st in the final 1993 NASCAR Championship Standings and earned officially half of the 1993 owner points fund for the #28 team.

Racing Champions produced a die-cast model of Allison's 1989 Texaco car as a tribute after his death, as well as his standard 1993 scheme in the main line of die-cast. Racing Champions also made die-cast replicas of cars Allison drove during his career in the Racing Champions Premier line, with a trading card that read "Champion Forever". A promotional die-cast 28 car was released with Allison's replacement, Ernie Irvan listed as driver to pay tribute to the team's win at Martinsville in the fall of 1993. Only 20,000 of them were released.

Allison was posthumously inducted into the International Motorsports Hall of Fame in 1998, and in 2018 he was announced as an inductee of the NASCAR Hall of Fame where he was formally inducted in 2019. Allison was also inducted into the Motorsports Hall of Fame of America in 2021.

Allison became a figure in a controversy as his widow became involved with country music star Joe Diffie shortly after Allison's death. Tabloid television programs and newspapers gave much coverage to the story at the time, with some claiming that the two had been lovers before Allison's death. Liz has openly discussed her relationship with Diffie, most recently on the Paul Finebaum Radio Network during the week of the 2006 race at Talladega. Liz expressed some regret over the relationship and mentioned that she and Diffie were band-aids for each other, and band aids were not meant to be permanent.

Liz Allison and their two children moved to Nashville and she married physical therapist Ryan Hackett on May 13, 2000. After being divorced for four years, Bobby and Judy Allison reunited at the wedding, after nearly seven years of tragedy had separated them.

On April 28, 2003, the mayor of Hueytown, Alabama, declared it Davey Allison Day and is celebrated on the weekend of the springtime Talladega race.

Due to Allison's death, Robert Yates initially chose not to field a car at the 1993 Miller Genuine Draft 400, stating "It's hard to race with tears in your eyes". Yates would return to Talladega with Robby Gordon replacing Allison in the No. 28, but he lost control of the Texaco/Havoline Ford early in the race and crashed and finished last. Lake Speed would take over driving duties until the 1993 Southern 500. Ernie Irvan, would later take over the ride at the Mountain Dew Southern 500 and won the Goody's 500 at Martinsville Speedway and it was a heartwarming time for Irvan's crew as it marked their first time back to victory lane since Allison's death. Irvan would also win the Mello Yello 500 at Charlotte as well. Racing Champions ran the No. 28 Havoline Ford with Ernie Irvan replacing Allison as the driver in tribute of the win.

Allison also had his own brand of chili by Bunker Hill with his face on the can. Allison also had a comic book printed about him during his racing days.

A road called "Allison-Bonnett Memorial Drive" in his hometown is honored by him, along with fellow native Neil Bonnett, who died a year after Davey.

In the videogames NASCAR 99, NASCAR 2000 and NASCAR Rumble, he appears as an unlockable NASCAR Legend with his Texaco Ford that he drove from 1987 to 1989.

Allison's livery style has been used as tributes by Ford (Robert Yates NASCAR Hall of Fame), Dr. Pepper / 7 Up Group (an associate sponsor of Allison in 1992 and 93), and Chevron (at least two occasions, primarily at Talladega, the Battlestar livery has been used as a retro livery). Most notably, Irvan put the 1987 Battlestar livery on the pole at the October 1997 Talladega race, much to the delight of fans.

In the 2021 GEICO 500, Joey Gase and his Rick Ware Racing No. 53 team would run a tribute scheme for Davey Allison. The car started 35th and finished 34th.

== Motorsports career results ==
=== NASCAR ===
(key) (Bold – Pole position awarded by qualifying time. Italics – Pole position earned by points standings or practice time. * – Most laps led.)

==== Winston Cup Series ====
NASCAR Winston Cup Series results
Year	Team	No.	Make	1	2	3	4	5	6	7	8	9	10	11	12	13	14	15	16	17	18	19	20	21	22	23	24	25	26	27	28	29	30	NWCC	Pts	Ref
1985	Branch-Ragan Racing	77	Chevy	DAY; DNQ	RCH	CAR	ATL; DNQ	BRI	DAR	NWS	MAR	TAL	DOV	CLT	RSD	POC	MCH	DAY	POC															70th	143	
1985	Ellington Racing	1	Chevy																	TAL; 10	MCH	BRI	DAR	RCH	DOV	MAR	NWS	CLT; 19	CAR	ATL; 42	RSD			70th	143	
1986	Sadler Brothers Racing	95	Chevy	DAY; DNQ	RCH; 12	CAR; 25	ATL	BRI; 20	DAR; 39	NWS	MAR																							47th	364	
1986	Sadler Brothers Racing	95	Buick									TAL; DNQ	DOV	CLT	RSD	POC	MCH	DAY	POC															47th	364	
1986	Junior Johnson & Associates	12	Chevy																	TAL; 7	GLN	MCH	BRI	DAR	RCH	DOV	MAR	NWS	CLT	CAR	ATL	RSD		47th	364	
1987	Ranier-Lundy Racing	28	Ford	DAY; 27	**CAR**; 9	RCH; 26	ATL; 5	DAR; 27	NWS	BRI	MAR	TAL; 1*	CLT; 16	DOV; 1*	POC; 12	RSD	MCH; 2	**DAY**; 20	POC; 5	TAL; 2*	GLN; 17	**MCH**; 5	BRI	**DAR**; 29	RCH	DOV; 2	MAR	NWS; 26	CLT; 19	**CAR**; 42	RSD; 14	ATL; 5		21st	2824	
1988	Ranier-Lundy Racing	28	Ford	DAY; 2	RCH; 29	CAR; 9	ATL; 40	DAR; 3	BRI; 29	NWS; 8	MAR; 6	**TAL**; 34	**CLT**; 5	DOV; 5	RSD; 32	POC; 5	MCH; 35	DAY; 38	POC; 3	TAL; 39	GLN; 16	MCH; 1	BRI; 4	DAR; 9	**RCH**; 1*	DOV; 4	MAR; 18	CLT; 19	NWS; 11	CAR; 27	PHO; 3	ATL; 2		8th	3631	
1989	Robert Yates Racing	28	Ford	DAY; 25	CAR; 6	ATL; 40	RCH; 5	DAR; 2	BRI; 4	NWS; 11	MAR; 14	TAL; 1*	CLT; 33	DOV; 32	SON; 9	POC; 16	MCH; 31	DAY; 1	POC; 6	TAL; 9	GLN; 4	MCH; 7	BRI; 25	DAR; 18	RCH; 10	**DOV**; 24	MAR; 21	CLT; 5	NWS; 21	CAR; 26	PHO; 39	ATL; 25		11th	3481	
1990	Robert Yates Racing	28	Ford	DAY; 20	RCH; 20	CAR; 34	ATL; 13	DAR; 3	BRI; 1	NWS; 9	MAR; 22	TAL; 25	CLT; 7	DOV; 17	SON; 24	POC; 5	MCH; 36	DAY; 24	POC; 5	TAL; 20	GLN; 19	MCH; 6	BRI; 23	DAR; 15	RCH; 16	DOV; 9	MAR; 7	NWS; 26	CLT; 1	CAR; 29	PHO; 11	ATL; 25		13th	3423	
1991	Robert Yates Racing	28	Ford	**DAY**; 15	**RCH**; 12	CAR; 16	ATL; 40	DAR; 2	BRI; 3	NWS; 6	MAR; 8	TAL; 22	CLT; 1*	DOV; 16	SON; 1	POC; 12	MCH; 1*	DAY; 3	POC; 14	TAL; 9	GLN; 10	MCH; 2*	BRI; 24	**DAR**; 12	RCH; 2*	DOV; 31	MAR; 29	NWS; 4	CLT; 2	CAR; 1	PHO; 1*	ATL; 17		3rd	4088	
1992	Robert Yates Racing	28	Ford	DAY; 1*	CAR; 2	RCH; 4	ATL; 4*	DAR; 4*	BRI; 28	NWS; 1	MAR; 26	TAL; 1*	CLT; 4	DOV; 11	SON; 28	POC; 5	**MCH**; 1*	DAY; 10	**POC**; 33*	TAL; 3	GLN; 20	MCH; 5	BRI; 30	DAR; 5	RCH; 19	DOV; 4	MAR; 16	NWS; 11	CLT; 19	CAR; 10	PHO; 1	ATL; 27		3rd	4015	
1993	Robert Yates Racing	28	Ford	DAY; 28	CAR; 14	RCH; 1	ATL; 13	DAR; 11	BRI; 5	NWS; 4	MAR; 2	TAL; 7	SON; 15	CLT; 30	DOV; 3	POC; 6	MCH; 35	DAY; 31	NHA; 3	POC	TAL	GLN	MCH	BRI	DAR	RCH	DOV	MAR	NWS	CLT	CAR	PHO	ATL	31st	2104	

===== Daytona 500 =====
Year	Team	Manufacturer	Start	Finish
1985	Branch-Ragan Racing	Chevrolet	DNQ	
1986	Sadler Brothers Racing	Chevrolet	DNQ	
1987	Ranier-Lundy Racing	Ford	2	27
1988	Ranier-Lundy Racing	Ford	2	2
1989	Robert Yates Racing	Ford	16	25
1990	Robert Yates Racing	Ford	16	20
1991	Robert Yates Racing	Ford	**1**	15
1992	Robert Yates Racing	Ford	6	**1**
1993	Robert Yates Racing	Ford	11	28

==== Busch Series ====
NASCAR Busch Series results
Year	Team	No.	Make	1	2	3	4	5	6	7	8	9	10	11	12	13	14	15	16	17	18	19	20	21	22	23	24	25	26	27	28	29	30	31	32	33	34	35	NBSC	Pts	Ref
1983	Bobby Allison Motorsports	23	Pontiac	DAY; DNQ	RCH	CAR; 25	HCY	MAR	NWS	SBO	GPS	LGY	DOV	BRI	CLT; 9	SBO	HCY	ROU	SBO	ROU	CRW	ROU	SBO	HCY	LGY	IRP	GPS	BRI	HCY	DAR; 4	RCH	NWS	SBO	MAR	ROU	CLT; 7	HCY	MAR	46th	532	
1984	Bobby Allison Motorsports	23	Pontiac	DAY; 28	RCH	CAR; 6	HCY	MAR	DAR	ROU	NSV	LGY	MLW; 5	DOV; 4	CLT; 31	SBO	HCY	ROU	SBO	ROU	HCY	IRP	LGY	SBO	BRI	DAR	RCH	NWS	CLT; 35	HCY	CAR; 28	MAR							33rd	751	
1985	Bobby Allison Motorsports	23	Buick	DAY; 38	CAR	HCY	BRI	MAR	DAR; 7	SBO	LGY	DOV; 22	CLT	SBO	HCY	ROU	IRP; 16	SBO	LGY	HCY	MLW	BRI	DAR	RCH	NWS	ROU	CLT; 40	HCY	CAR	MAR									48th	335	
1986	Sadler Brothers Racing	95	Buick	DAY; 34	CAR; 20	HCY	MAR	BRI	DAR; 5	SBO	LGY	JFC	DOV; 29	CLT; 3	SBO	HCY	ROU	IRP	SBO								DAR; 25												29th	1046	
1986	Whitaker Racing	7	Buick																	RAL; 25	OXF	SBO; 23	HCY	LGY	ROU	BRI; 5		RCH; 25	DOV	MAR; 30	ROU								29th	1046	
1986	Allison Racing	28	Buick																													CLT; 9	**CAR**; 2	MAR					29th	1046	
1988	Allison Racing	28	Ford	DAY; 6	HCY	CAR; 13	MAR	DAR; 40	BRI	LNG	NZH; 32	SBO	NSV	CLT; 40	DOV	ROU	LAN	LVL	MYB	OXF	SBO	HCY	LNG																32nd	1111	
1988	Allison Racing	28	Buick																					IRP; 28	ROU	BRI; 7	DAR; 4	RCH	DOV; 10	MAR	CLT; DNQ	CAR; 3*	MAR						32nd	1111	
1989	Allison Racing	28	Ford	DAY; DNQ																						DAR; 29	RCH; 32	DOV	MAR	CLT									38th	954	
1989	Allison Racing	28	Buick		CAR; 29	MAR	HCY	DAR; 7	BRI	NZH; 5	SBO	LAN	NSV	CLT; 31	DOV	ROU	LVL	VOL	MYB; 27	SBO	HCY	DUB	IRP; 29	ROU	BRI; 14						CAR; 26	MAR							38th	954	
1990	Allison Racing	28	Buick	DAY	RCH	CAR	MAR	HCY	DAR; 31	BRI	LAN	SBO																											36th	1018	
1990	Allison Racing	28	Chevy										**NZH**; 10	HCY	CLT; 6	DOV	ROU	VOL	MYB	OXF	NHA	SBO	DUB	IRP; 19	ROU	BRI; 8	DAR; 7	RCH; 26	DOV	MAR	CLT; 31	NHA; 16	CAR; 6	MAR					36th	1018	
1991	Allison Racing	28	Chevy	DAY; 3	RCH; 10	CAR; 34	MAR	VOL	HCY	DAR; DNQ	BRI; 11	LAN	SBO	NZH; 30	CLT; 36	DOV; 6	ROU	HCY	MYB	GLN	OXF																		31st	1303	
1991	Allison Racing	28	Buick																			NHA; 30	SBO	DUB	IRP	ROU	BRI; 4	DAR; 34	RCH; 21	DOV	CLT; 37	NHA; 44	CAR; 35	MAR					31st	1303	
1992	Allison Racing	28	Ford	DAY; 12	CAR; 3	RCH; 25	ATL; 4	MAR	DAR; 34	BRI; 2	HCY	LAN	DUB	NZH	CLT	DOV	ROU	MYB	GLN	VOL	NHA; 32	TAL	IRP	ROU	MCH	NHA	BRI	DAR	RCH	DOV; Wth	CLT	MAR	CAR	HCY					44th	838	
1993	Allison Racing	28	Ford	DAY; 36	CAR; 35	RCH; 31	DAR; 13	BRI	HCY	ROU	MAR	NZH	CLT; 30	DOV	MYB	GLN	MLW; 27	TAL	IRP	MCH	NHA	BRI	DAR	RCH	DOV	ROU	CLT	MAR	CAR	HCY	ATL; QL^{†}								52nd	462	
^{†} - Qualified but replaced by Hut Stricklin

==== Busch North Series ====
NASCAR Busch North Series results
Year	Team	No.	Make	1	2	3	4	5	6	7	8	9	10	11	12	13	14	15	16	17	18	19	20	21	22	23	24	25	NBNSC	Pts	Ref
1988		68		DAY	CAR	DAR	NZH	MND	OXF	OXF	DOV	OXF	JEN	CNB	EPP	TIO	OXF	JEN; 11	TMP	IRP	OXF	RPS	DAR	RCH	DOV	OXF	OXF	EPP	52nd	130	
1989	Larry Caron	28	Buick	DAY	CAR	MAR	OXF	NZH	MND	OXF	DOV	OXF	JEN	EPP	HOL	OXF; 41	JEN	OXF	IRP	TMP	OXF	RPS	OXF	RCH	DOV	EPP			64th	67	

==== Winston West Series ====
NASCAR Winston West Series results
Year	Team	No.	Make	1	2	3	4	5	6	7	8	9	10	11	12	13	14	NWWSC	Pts	Ref
1980	Bobby Allison Motorsports	12	AMC	RSD	ONT	S99	RSD	LAG	EVG	POR	SON	MMR	ONT	PHO; 29				NA	NA	
1981	Unknown	21	Mercury	RSD	S99	AAS	MMR	RSD	LAG; DNQ	POR	WSP	EVG	SHA	RSD	SON	RSD	PHO	NA	0	
1992	Allison Racing	28	Ford	MMR	SGS	SON	SHA	POR	EVG	SSS	CAJ	TWS	MMR; 20	PHO				48th	108	
1993	Schmitt Motorsports	28	Ford	TWS	MMR	SGS	SON	TUS	SHA	EVG; 18	POR	CBS	SSS	CAJ	TCR	MMR	PHO	48th	109	

=== ARCA Permatex SuperCar Series ===
(key) (Bold – Pole position awarded by qualifying time. Italics – Pole position earned by points standings or practice time. * – Most laps led.)

ARCA Permatex SuperCar Series results
Year	Team	No.	Make	1	2	3	4	5	6	7	8	9	10	11	12	13	14	15	16	17	18	19	20	APSC	Pts	Ref
1980	Bobby Allison Motorsports	11	AMC	DAY	NWS	FRS	FRS	MCH	TAL	IMS	FRS	MCH; 14												NA	0	
1981	Bobby Allison Motorsports		AMC	DAY	DSP	FRS	FRS	BFS	TAL; DNQ	FRS	COR													NA	-	
1982	Bobby Allison Motorsports	12	AMC	NSV	DAY; 18	TAL	FRS	CMS	WIN	NSV	TAT													NA	0	
1982	Bobby Allison Motorsports	23	Pontiac									TAL; 3	FRS	BFS	MIL	SND								NA	0	
1983	Sims Brothers Racing	23	Pontiac	DAY; 34	NSV												TAL; 1*	MCS	FRS					13th	845	
1983	Bobby Allison Motorsports	22	Pontiac			**TAL**; 1*	LPR	LPR	ISF	IRP	SSP	FRS	BFS	WIN	LPR	POC; 2								13th	845	
1983	Bobby Allison Motorsports	22	Buick																	MIL; 4	DSF	ZAN	SND	13th	845	
1984	Allison Racing	23	Pontiac	DAY; 4*	**ATL**; 1*	**TAL**; 1*									ISF; 18	DSF; 30								3rd	2425	
1984	Allison Racing	23	Buick				CSP; 11	SMS; 3	FRS; 4	MCS; 5	**LCS**; 16	IRP; 2*	**TAL**; 13	FRS			TOL; 9	MGR; 1						3rd	2425	
1985	Miller American Racing	23	Buick	ATL; 24			TAL; 1	ATL; 1	SSP; 14	IRP; 16	CSP; 4	FRS; 18	IRP; 2				TOL; 4							3rd	2450	
1985	Miller American Racing	23	Pontiac		DAY; 2	ATL; 7								OEF; 7	ISF; 28	DSF; 30								3rd	2450	
1986	Reet Racing	75	Chevy	ATL	DAY	ATL	TAL; 2	SIR	SSP	FRS	KIL	CSP	TAL	BLN	ISF	DSF	TOL	MCS	ATL					79th	-	

=== International Race of Champions ===
(key) (Bold – Pole position. * – Most laps led.)

International Race of Champions results
Year	Make	1	2	3	4	Pos.	Pts	Ref
1992	Dodge	DAY; 4	TAL; 1	MCH	MCH	7th	42	
1993	Dodge	DAY; 2	DAR; 1*	TAL; 6	MCH	1st	63	

== See also ==
- List of all-time NASCAR Cup Series winners
  - List of Daytona 500 winners
- List of Daytona 500 pole position winners
- List of fatalities from aviation accidents
- List of NASCAR All-Star Race drivers
- List of people from Alabama
  - Alabama Gang
- List of sportspeople who died during their careers
- NASCAR's 50 Greatest Drivers
- NASCAR Winston Cup Series era

Sporting positions
Preceded by Ricky Rudd	IROC Champion; IROC XVII (1993)	Succeeded by Mark Martin
Achievements
Preceded by Ernie Irvan	Daytona 500 winner 1992	Succeeded by Dale Jarrett
Preceded by Rusty Wallace	Coca-Cola 600 winner 1991	Succeeded by Dale Earnhardt
Awards
Preceded by Alan Kulwicki	NASCAR Winston Cup Series Rookie of the Year; 1987	Succeeded by Ken Bouchard
