= IROC XVII =

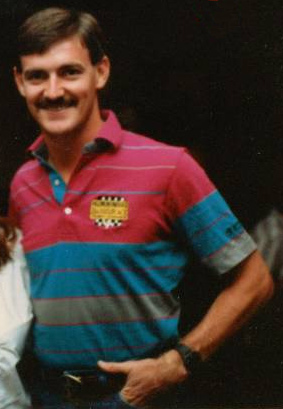
Davey Allison posthumously won the IROC XVII championship.

IROC XVII was the seventeenth year of IROC competition, which took place in 1993. It was the fourth and final year the Dodge Daytona was used in competition, and continued the format introduced in IROC VIII. Race one took place on the Daytona International Speedway, race two took place at Darlington Raceway, race three was held at Talladega Superspeedway, and race four ran at Michigan International Speedway. Davey Allison won the series championship posthumously after dying in a helicopter accident at the Talladega Superspeedway. With only one race remaining, Terry Labonte drove the final race, and the points from that race, applied to Allison's previous total, were enough to secure the championship. The winnings of $175,000 were placed in a trust fund for Allison's children.

The roster of drivers and final points standings were as follows:

Rank	Driver	Points	Winnings	Series
1	(United States) Davey Allison ^{1}	63	$175,000	NASCAR Winston Cup
2	(United States) Al Unser Jr.	60.5	$65,000	IndyCar
3	(United States) Bill Elliott	50	$55,000	NASCAR Winston Cup
4	(United States) Ricky Rudd	49	$50,000	NASCAR Winston Cup; Defending IROC Champion
5	(United States) Alan Kulwicki ^{2}	47	$45,000	NASCAR Winston Cup
6	(Australia) Geoff Brabham ^{3}	44	$40,000	IMSA Camel GT
7	(United States) Harry Gant ^{3}	44	$40,000	NASCAR Winston Cup
8	(United States) Jack Baldwin	37	$40,000	SCCA Trans-Am Series
9	(United States) Davy Jones	34	$40,000	IMSA Camel GT
10	(Argentina) Juan Manuel Fangio II ^{4}	27	$40,000	IMSA Camel GT
11	(Netherlands) Arie Luyendyk	24.5	$40,000	IndyCar
12	(United States) Al Unser	21	$40,000	IndyCar

== Individual Race results ==
=== Race One, Daytona International Speedway ===
Friday, February 12, 1993

Finish	Grid	Car no.	Driver	Car Make	Car Color	Laps	Status	Laps Led	Points
1	7	10	(United States) Bill Elliott	Dodge Daytona	Red	40	0:33:00	6	23***
2	4	4	(United States) Davey Allison	Dodge Daytona	Black	40	Running	1	17
3	6	6	(United States) Al Unser Jr.	Dodge Daytona	Purple	40	Running	11	17**
4	3	3	(United States) Davy Jones	Dodge Daytona	Lime	40	Running	1	12
5	8	8	(United States) Ricky Rudd	Dodge Daytona	Dark Orange	40	Running	21	15*
6	11	11	(Netherlands) Arie Luyendyk	Dodge Daytona	Light Purple	40	Running		9
7	12	12	(Australia) Geoff Brabham	Dodge Daytona	Blue	40	Running		8
8	7	7	(United States) Harry Gant	Dodge Daytona	White	40	Running		7
9	2	2	(United States) Alan Kulwicki	Dodge Daytona	Orange	40	Running		6
10	1	1	(Argentina) Juan Manuel Fangio II	Dodge Daytona	Cream	40	Running		5
11	9	9	(United States) Jack Baldwin	Dodge Daytona	Powder Blue	40	Running		4
12	5	5	(United States) Al Unser	Dodge Daytona	Light Pink	31	Crash		3

one *: Bonus points for leading the most laps.
two **: Bonus points for leading the 2nd most laps.
three ***: Bonus points for leading the 3rd most laps.

Average speed: 181.726 mph
Cautions: 1
Margin of victory: 1 car length
Lead changes: 10

=== Race Two, Darlington Raceway ===
Saturday, March 27, 1993

Finish	Grid	Car no.	Driver	Car Make	Car Color	Laps	Status	Laps Led	Points
1	9	2	(United States) Davey Allison	Dodge Daytona	Light Purple	60	0:34:31	49	26*
2	12	13	(United States) Dale Earnhardt ^{5}	Dodge Daytona	Gold (Name on car: Unser Jr.)	60	Running		3.5 ^{5}
3	5	8	(United States) Harry Gant	Dodge Daytona	Purple	60	Running		14
4	11	6	(United States) Rusty Wallace ^{6}	Dodge Daytona	Powder Blue (Name on car: Luyendyk)	60	Running		3.5 ^{6}
5	7	5	(United States) Ricky Rudd	Dodge Daytona	Light Blue	60	Running		10
6	3	10	(Argentina) Juan Manuel Fangio II	Dodge Daytona	Mustard	60	Running		9
7	8	4	(United States) Davy Jones	Dodge Daytona	White	60	Running		8
8	2	11	(United States) Jack Baldwin	Dodge Daytona	Yellow	60	Running		7
9	1	12	(United States) Al Unser	Dodge Daytona	Dark Red	60	Running	2	8***
10	10	1	(United States) Bill Elliott	Dodge Daytona	Black	26	Mechanical		5
11	4	9	(United States) Alan Kulwicki	Dodge Daytona	Orange	14	Mechanical	9	7**
12	6	7	(Australia) Geoff Brabham	Dodge Daytona	Silver	9	Crash		3

one *: Bonus points for leading the most laps.
two **: Bonus points for leading the 2nd most laps.
three ***: Bonus points for leading the 3rd most laps.

Average speed: 142.47 mph
Cautions: 3
Margin of victory: .63 sec
Lead changes: 2

Cautions

From Lap	To Lap	# of laps	Reason
8	8	0	Jack Baldwin spin turn 1
10	10	0	Geoff Brabham accident turn 2
36	36	0	Competition

Lap Leaders

Leader	From lap	To lap	# of laps
Al Unser	1	2	2
Alan Kulwicki	3	11	9
Davey Allison	12	60	49

=== Race Three, Talladega Superspeedway ===
Saturday May 1, 1993

Finish	Grid	Car no.	Driver	Car Make	Car Color	Laps	Status	Laps Led	Points
1	7	6	(United States) Al Unser Jr.	Dodge Daytona	Blue	38	0:31:48	13	26*
2	4	9	(United States) Jack Baldwin	Dodge Daytona	Rose	38	Running	1	17
3	5	8	(United States) Dale Earnhardt ^{7}	Dodge Daytona	Black (Name on car: Kulwicki)	38	Running	8	17**
4	10	3	(United States) Ricky Rudd	Dodge Daytona	Red	38	Running	4	12
5	6	7	(Argentina) Juan Manuel Fangio II	Dodge Daytona	Lime	38	Running	3	10
6	12	1	(United States) Davey Allison	Dodge Daytona	Gold	38	Running	6	11***
7	9	4	(United States) Harry Gant	Dodge Daytona	Cream	34	Running		8
8	2	11	(Australia) Geoff Brabham	Dodge Daytona	Light Pink	33	Mechanical	3	7
9	8	5	(United States) Davy Jones	Dodge Daytona	White	12	Crash		6
10	1	12	(Netherlands) Arie Luyendyk	Dodge Daytona	Powder Blue	12	Crash		5
11	3	10	(United States) Al Unser	Dodge Daytona	Yellow	6	Crash		4
12	11	2	(United States) Bill Elliott	Dodge Daytona	Mustard	5	Crash		3

one *: Bonus points for leading the most laps.
two **: Bonus points for leading the 2nd most laps.
three ***: Bonus points for leading the 3rd most laps.

Average speed: 190.716 mph
Cautions: n/a
Margin of victory: .25 cl
Lead changes: 18

=== Race Four, Michigan International Speedway ===
Saturday, July 31, 1993

Finish	Grid	Car no.	Driver	Car Make	Car Color	Laps	Status	Laps Led	Points
1	3	10	(Australia) Geoff Brabham	Dodge Daytona	Dark Red	50	0:37:44	9	24**
2	8	4	(United States) Bill Elliott	Dodge Daytona	Lime	50	Running	1	17
3	10	2	(United States) Al Unser Jr.	Dodge Daytona	Red	50	Running		14
4	6	6	(United States) Harry Gant	Dodge Daytona	Purple	50	Running		12
5	7	5	(United States) Dale Earnhardt ^{7}	Dodge Daytona	Cream (Name on car: Kulwicki)	50	Running	39	15*
6	11	1	(United States) Terry Labonte ^{8}	Dodge Daytona	Blue (Name on car: Allison)	50	Running		9
7	9	3	(United States) Ricky Rudd	Dodge Daytona	Gold	50	Running		8
8	2	11	(Netherlands) Arie Luyendyk	Dodge Daytona	Orange	50	Running		7
9	4	8	(United States) Davy Jones	Dodge Daytona	Black	50	Running		6
10	5	7	(United States) Jack Baldwin	Dodge Daytona	Rose	50	Running	4	7***
11	1	12	(United States) Al Unser	Dodge Daytona	Powder Blue	50	Running		4
12	12	9	(Argentina) Juan Manuel Fangio II ^{4}	Dodge Daytona	Not assigned	0	Did Not Start, Withdrew		3

one *: Bonus points for leading the most laps.
two **: Bonus points for leading the 2nd most laps.
three ***: Bonus points for leading the 3rd most laps.

Average speed: 159.017 mph
Cautions: none
Margin of victory: 0.41 sec
Lead changes: 7

== Notes ==
1. Davey Allison was awarded the championship posthumously. Terry Labonte drove the final race in Allison's place, and Labonte's points were added to Allison's point total.
2. Alan Kulwicki was killed in a plane crash on April 1, 1993. Dale Earnhardt drove in his place, and all the points Earnhardt earned were applied to Kulwicki's point total. The prize money for finishing fifth in points was donated to the Winston Cup Racing Wives Auxiliary, Brenner Children's Hospital and St. Thomas Aquinas Church charities.
3. Geoff Brabham and Harry Gant tied for sixth place in the final points standings, but Brabham was awarded the position due to a better finishing position in the final race.
4. Juan Manuel Fangio II withdrew from the series before the final race.
5. Dale Earnhardt started in place of an injured Al Unser Jr., Earnhardt was awarded no points for the race, and Unser Jr. shared 11th and 12th place points with Arie Luyendyk, who also did not start due to injury.
6. Rusty Wallace started in place of an injured Arie Luyendyk. Wallace did not receive points for the start, and Luyendyk shared 11th and 12th place points with Al Unser Jr., who also did not start due to injury.
7. Dale Earnhardt took the place of the late Alan Kulwicki beginning with race three, and all points earned were added to Kulwicki's total.
8. Terry Labonte drove in place of the late Davey Allison for the final race, with all points earned added to Allison's total.
