= Alan Kulwicki Memorial Park =

Park in Greenfield. Wisconsin

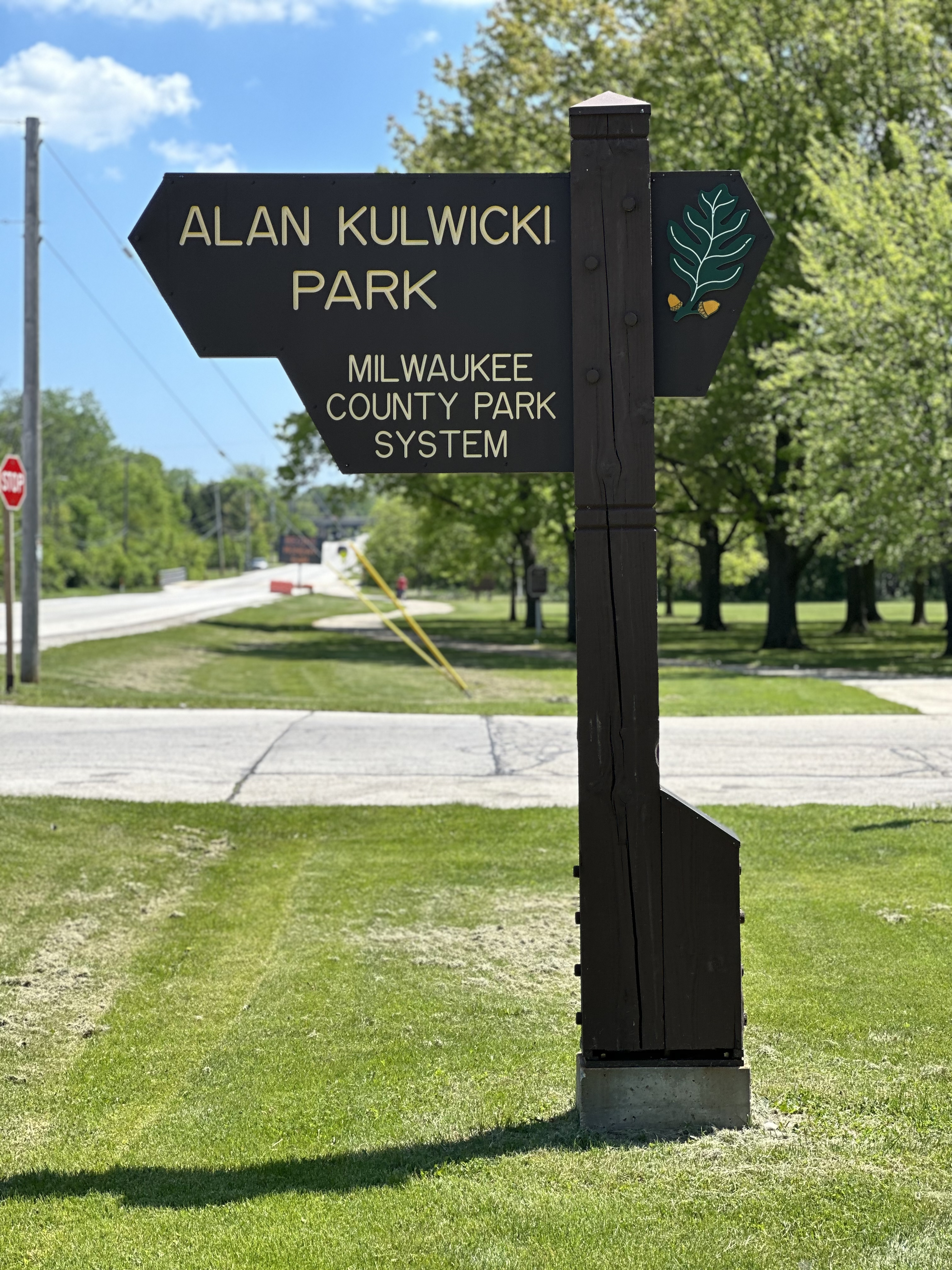
- Alan Kulwicki Park sign
- Interactive map of Alan Kulwicki Memorial Park
- Nearest city: Milwaukee
- Coordinates: 42.9636°N 88.0453°W
- Area: 28 acres (11 ha)
- Opened: June 6, 1998
- Manager: The Greenfield Lion's Club; City of Greenfield, Wisconsin
- Terrain: Green space; Forest
- Water: Creek
- Facilities: Pavilion

Alan Kulwicki Memorial Park is located in Milwaukee County, Wisconsin, United States. The park is in the city of Greenfield, Wisconsin and it features a building with memorabilia commemorating its namesake, NASCAR driver Alan Kulwicki. The building is an Alan Kulwicki museum.

The park was financed and maintained by private donations and Milwaukee County Park System involvement. In 1996, the project to create the park received a US$250,000 donation from Hooters chairman Robert H. Brooks.

There is a pavilion on the property which is maintained and operated by the Greater Greenfield Lions Club. In addition baseball diamonds found in the park are maintained by the Greenfield Little League Baseball teams.

== Background ==
On April 1, 1993, NASCAR driver Alan Kulwicki died in an airplane crash. The plane crashed on final approach to Tri-Cities Regional Airport in Bristol, Tennessee. After Kulwicki's death, planning began for a memorial park to honor him. The park was funded by donations from various people.

Kulwicki's car sponsor was Hooters, and in 1996, a US$250,000 donation was received from Hooters chairman Robert H. Brooks. The building (Brooks Pavilion) on the grounds was named after Mark Brooks, a member of the Brooks family who also died in the 1993 crash. It is located at 10777 W. Cold Spring Road in Greenfield, Wisconsin opened on June 6, 1998. The city of Greenfield was selected as a site for the park because Alan Kulwicki was a Greenfield native. In 2017 The Milwaukee Journal Sentinel reported that donations and grants would make the park as self-sufficient as possible. The park is adjacent to the Root River Parkway, and the Wimmer Wetlands.

== History ==
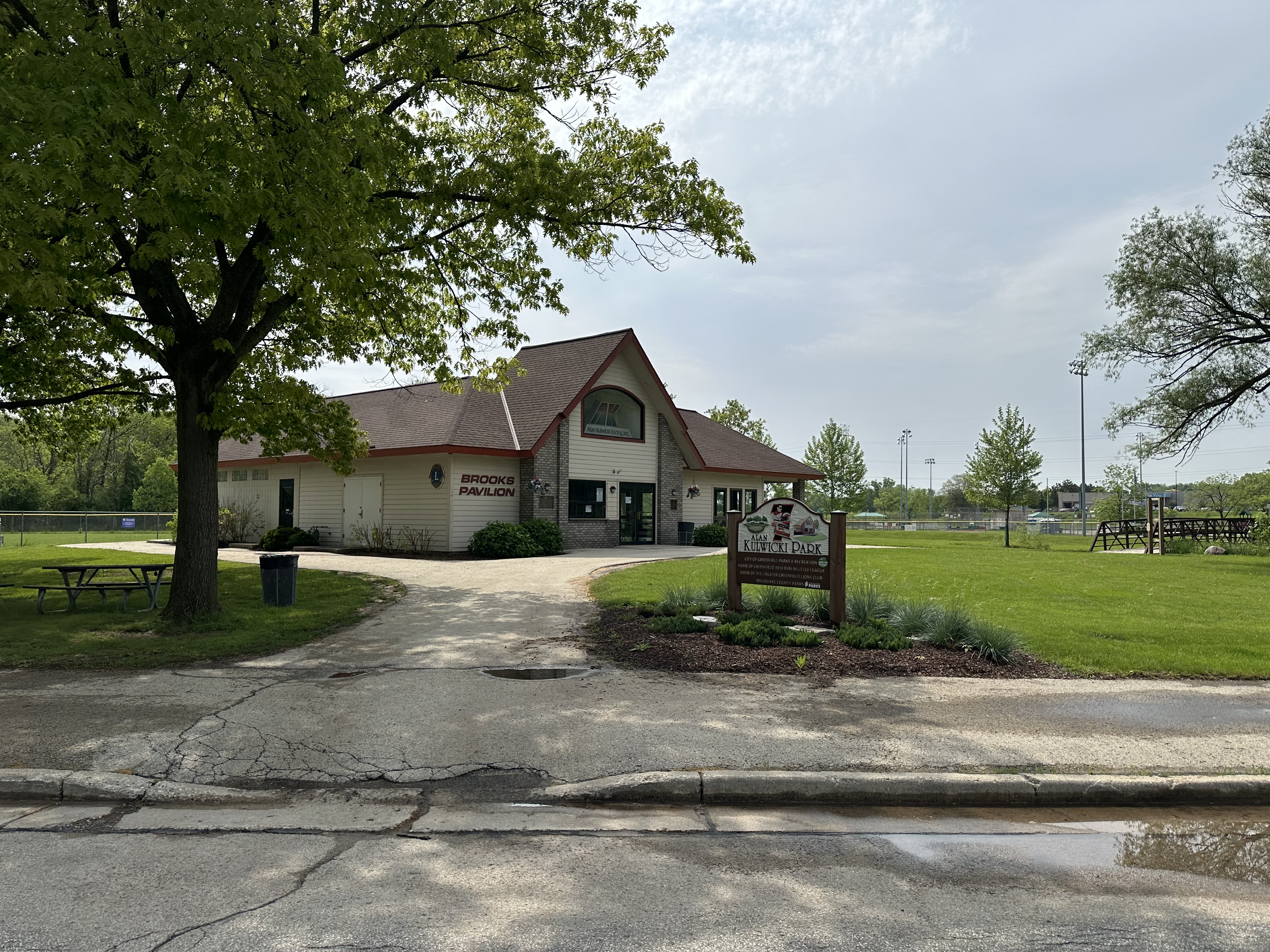
Alan Kulwicki Memorial Park Pavilion

Alan Kulwicki Memorial Park is 28 acres (11 ha) and it is located in Greenfield, Wisconsin. It is part of the Milwaukee County Park System. The park also has a building which houses an Alan Kulwicki museum featuring items from Kulwicki’s racing career displayed. The building has a black and white checkered floor. The building displays his 1992 Winston Cup trophy and several others from his career. There is a fiberglass replica of his number seven car with Hooters advertising.

The park features Little League Baseball diamonds. The Greenfield Lion's Club manages the building and the Greenfield Little League uses the baseball diamonds. The park is managed by Milwaukee County. In 2017 the park collected US$5000 from the Greenfield Little League for the use of baseball diamonds. In subsequent years the little league was tasked with doing their own maintenance of the playing fields. Public tax money was also needed for maintenance of the park and pathways. The City of Greenfield Park also rents the park for gatherings. Greenfield Parks and Recreation is the entity that rents out the park areas and baseball diamonds.
