= Kulwicki =

Brodzic coat of arms used by some of Kulwicki family

Kulwicki (feminine: Kulwicka, plural: Kulwiccy) is a Polish surname. Some of them use Brodzic coat of arms. Notable people with the surname include:

== People ==
- Alan Kulwicki (1954–1993), nicknamed "Polish Prince", American auto racing driver and team owner
- Dustin Kulwicki, Cave Story video game composer
- Katarzyna Kulwicka (born 1964), Polish basketball player
- Lech Kulwicki (born 1951), Polish footballer who played as a defender
- Rick Kulwicki (1961–2011), American rock guitarist of band The Fluid

== Other ==
- Kulwicki Motorsports Laboratory, at Charlotte Research Institute
- Kulwicki Driver Development Program (Kulwicki DDP), began in 2015 young drivers support competition
- Alan Kulwicki Racing, a championship-winning NASCAR Winston Cup Series team
- Alan Kulwicki Memorial Park, Milwaukee County, Wisconsin, United States
