= Coby G. Brooks =

American businessman

Coby Garrett Brooks (born May 17, 1969) is the former president and CEO of Hooters, Inc. and Naturally Fresh, Inc. Brooks was promoted to these positions in 2003, three years before the death of his father, Hooters chairman Robert H. Brooks.

After his father's death, Brooks gained a controlling interest in his father's companies and was named chairman of his father's estate. He became embroiled in a dispute with his father's widow, Tami, over the distribution of the elder Brooks' estate. Brooks was left 30 percent of his father's estate.

Brooks appeared on an episode of the CBS reality TV show Undercover Boss featuring Hooters in February 2010. Brooks left Hooters after the sale of the company in 2011 and is now a franchisee of Twin Peaks, another "breastaurant" chain. Brooks also made a cameo alongside Twin Peaks CEO Randy DeWitt on another episode of Undercover Boss, going undercover as a "rude patron" to ensure employees were aware of the protocols of dealing with rude customers after encountering some that were unaware at earlier jobs. He was ejected from the bar and would appear at the end of the episode to donate $15,000 to the bartender at that location. After Brooks's departure from Hooters, he was replaced by Terrance M. Marks. He made a third cameo in the Cinnabon episode to give advice to a CEO going undercover that was a chairperson in the Hooters episode. He would also appear in the Epic Bosses and Epic Employees highlight episodes.
