= Toyota/Save Mart 350 =

Auto race held in Sonoma, United States

NASCAR Cup Series
- Venue: Sonoma Raceway
- Location: Sonoma, California, United States
- Corporate sponsor: Toyota; Save Mart
- First race: 1989
- Distance: 218.9 miles (352.285 km)
- Laps: 110; Stage 1: 25; Stage 2: 35; Final stage: 50
- Previous names: Banquet Frozen Foods 300 (1989–1991); Save Mart 300K (1992); Save Mart Supermarkets 300K (1993); Save Mart Supermarkets 300 (1994–1997); Save Mart/Kragen 350 (1998–2000); Dodge/Save Mart 350 (2001–2006)
- Most wins (driver): Jeff Gordon (5)
- Most wins (team): Hendrick Motorsports (8)
- Most wins (manufacturer): Chevrolet (15)

Circuit information
- Surface: Asphalt
- Length: 1.99 mi (3.20 km)
- Turns: 12

The Toyota/Save Mart 350 is a 218.9-mile (352.3 km) stock car racing event in the NASCAR Cup Series that has been held annually at Sonoma Raceway at Sears Point in Sonoma, California since 1989.

The race joined the NASCAR circuit in 1989. It was added as a replacement for the Budweiser 400 at Riverside, which closed in 1988. The race has undergone several name and length changes since its inception. The NASCAR "West Series" held a combination race from 1989 to 1997 and has held a standalone race since 2006. Due to the track's unique layout, the race generates annual discussion, with media, fans, and participants both in favor and against racing this event. Due to its unique layout, "road course ringers" are common, a NASCAR term standing for drivers that appear on the NASCAR circuit only for the road course races.

Shane van Gisbergen is the defending winner of the event.

== Race history ==
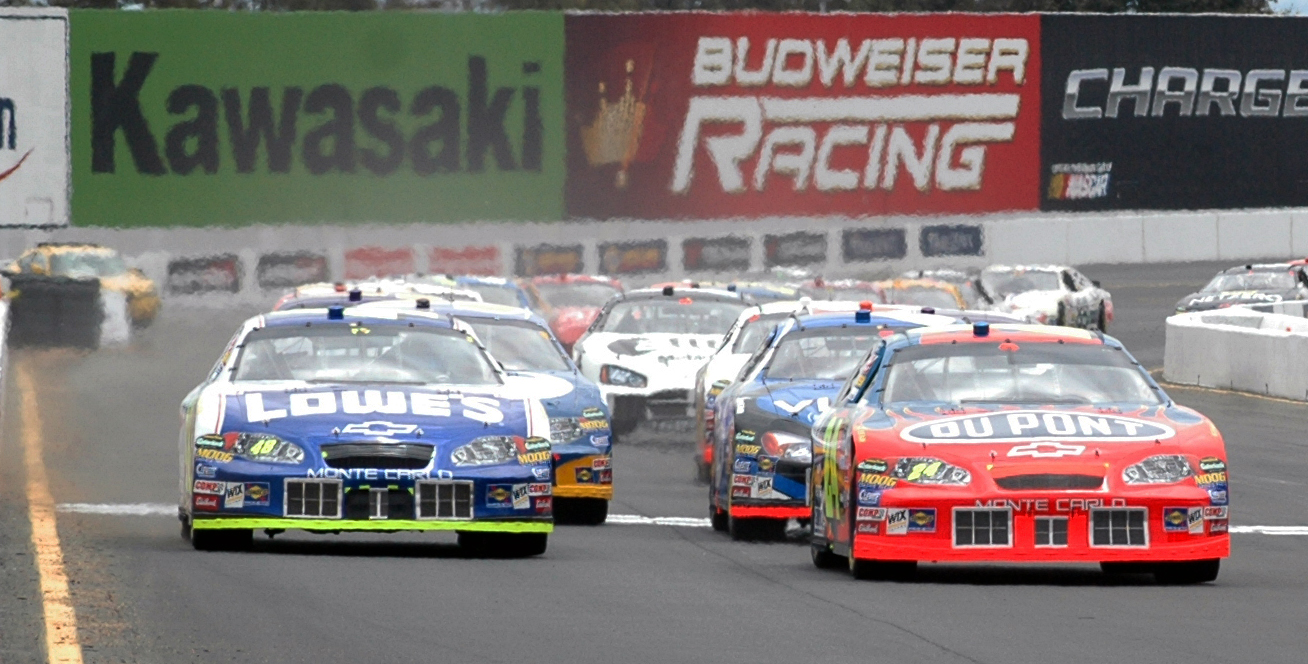
Jeff Gordon and Jimmie Johnson leading the field at the start of the 2005 race

From 1989 to 1997, 2019 and 2021, NASCAR uses the full 2.52 miles (4.06 km) road course, best known for sports car racing. Subtle changes to some of the turns accommodated the stock cars and increased passing widths. Ricky Rudd won the inaugural Cup race at Sonoma.

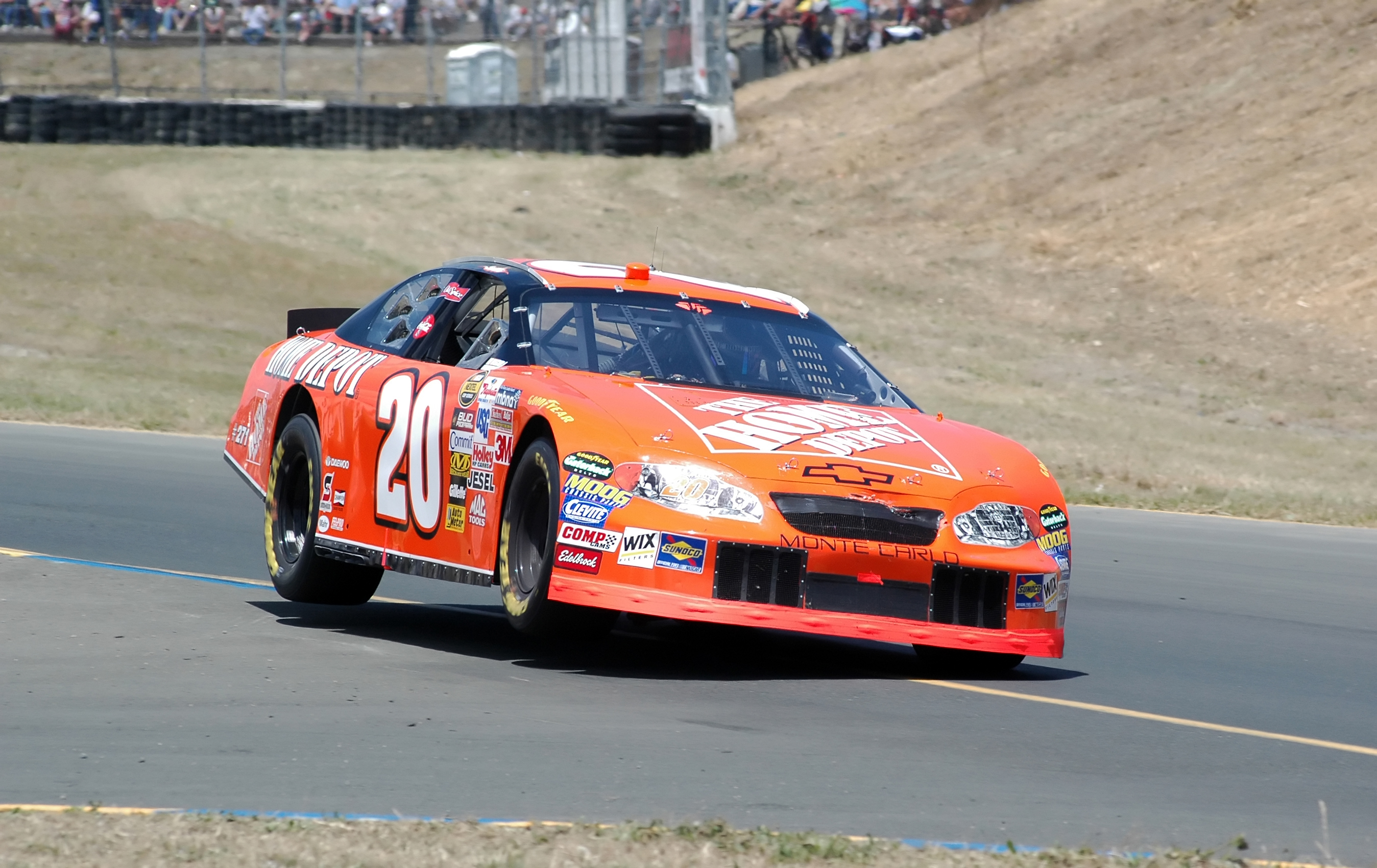
Tony Stewart 2005 at Infineon

The 1991 Sonoma Cup race ended in a controversial fashion. With seven laps left in the race, Mark Martin tried to pass Tommy Kendall, subbing for an injured Kyle Petty. The two made contact, resulting in Martin crashing into the tire barrier on a pull-over site and Kendall cutting his tire. The lead went to Davey Allison. Then, with two laps left, pole-sitter Rudd passed Allison for the lead but Allison spun out from contact in the final turn. Rudd led to the white flag and was contending to win the race, his second Sonoma victory, and to advance his championship points to the lead. However, as he came around to take the win, Rudd was black-flagged just three feet from the finish line. Allison was declared the winner of the race with Rudd's controversial penalty while Rudd finished in second place.

The last Sonoma NASCAR race held at the previous road course passage was in 1997 on October 5 at a Truck Series event. There, Joe Ruttman won the race but controversy erupted when Rich Bickle blamed a loss of a top-ten finish on rookie Boris Said. Bickle cut down Said's tire and in reply Said waited for Bickle to come back around and crashed him. NASCAR, after a brief red flag for a massive crash in a wall of tires, disqualified Said and fined him $10,000 for his actions.

In 1998, the circuit for the NASCAR event was shorted from the full road course to a 1.95 miles (3.14 km) modified road course with the addition of the Chute from turn 4 to turn 7, bypassing turns 5 and 6.

In 2001, the Chute was modified to such that the NASCAR circuit measured 1.99 miles (3.20 km) long.

The 2014 running of the race, the final event from Sonoma broadcast on TNT, was dedicated to NASCAR designer Ray Fox, as mentioned in a moment of silence dedicated to his memory, as well as in the opening invocation.

In 2019, the race returned to the full 2.52 miles (4.06 km) road course layout to commemorate its 50th anniversary. This marked the return of the Carousel section after a 22-year hiatus.

The 2020 race was canceled due to the COVID-19 pandemic.

In 2022, the race was reverted to racing the club configuration.

== Gilligan's Island ==
From 1989 to 2001, the pit road could only accommodate 34 pit stalls. In the early years, some teams were required to share pit stalls while other teams were forced to pit inside the garage area. When cars dropped out of the race, their pit stalls were reassigned to cars who were sharing.

Before the 1994 race, a makeshift auxiliary pit road was constructed inside the hairpin (turn 11) nicknamed Gilligan's Island. Cars that had the nine slowest qualifying speeds were relegated to these pit stalls. Pitting in this area was considered an inconvenience and a competitive disadvantage, more so than even the disadvantages one would experience pitting on the backstretch on a short track at the time.

Since the length of the auxiliary pit road was significantly shorter than the main pit road, the cars that pitted there were held from 15 to 20 seconds to make up for the time that would have been spent if the cars had traveled the entire main pit road.

Pitting on Gilligan's Island had several other inconveniences. The location (the staging area for drag races) was landlocked by the racecourse, and crew members were unable to leave once the race began. Teams sent only the primary pit crew to Gilligan's Island, and once they were there, they could not access the garage area or their transporters to collect spare parts/tools. The only repairs that could be made were routine tire changes and refueling, as well as only minor repairs. Other auxiliary pit crew members, who were not part of the main crew, were staged in the garage area and would have to service the car if it required major repairs. If a team pitting on Gilligan's Island dropped out of the race, the crew was unable to pack up their supplies and prepare to leave (a common practice at other tracks) until the race was over.

Changes to the track in 2002 that included a separation of the drag strip from the front stretch, removal of the main drag strip grandstand, and the new control tower for road racing led to the pit road being expanded by extending pit road into the main straight and moving the pit exit up the hill past Turn 1, thereby expanding it to 43 cars, and Gilligan's Island was abandoned.

== Trophy ==
The trophy is in the form of a wine bottle holder paired with a giant wine glass as a nod to the Sonoma County wine industry.

== Past winners ==
Year	Date	No.	Driver	Team	Manufacturer	Race distance		Race time	Average speed (mph)	Report	Ref
Year	Date	No.	Driver	Team	Manufacturer	Laps	Miles (km)	Race time	Average speed (mph)	Report	Ref
2.52 miles (4.06 km) layout
1989	June 11	26	Ricky Rudd	King Racing	Buick	74	186.48 (300.11)	2:27:03	76.088	Report	
1990	June 10	27	Rusty Wallace	Blue Max Racing	Pontiac	74	186.48 (300.11)	2:41:35	69.245	Report	
1991	June 9	28	Davey Allison	Robert Yates Racing	Ford	74	186.48 (300.11)	2:33:20	72.97	Report	
1992	June 7	4	Ernie Irvan	Morgan-McClure Motorsports	Chevrolet	74	186.48 (300.11)	2:17:26	81.413	Report	
1993	May 16	15	Geoff Bodine	Bud Moore Engineering	Ford	74	186.48 (300.11)	2:25:17	77.013	Report	
1994	May 15	28	Ernie Irvan	Robert Yates Racing	Ford	74	186.48 (300.11)	2:24:27	77.458	Report	
1995	May 7	3	Dale Earnhardt	Richard Childress Racing	Chevrolet	74	186.48 (300.11)	2:38:18	70.681	Report	
1996	May 5	2	Rusty Wallace	Penske Racing	Ford	74	186.48 (300.11)	2:24:03	77.673	Report	
1997	May 5	6	Mark Martin	Roush Racing	Ford	74	186.48 (300.11)	2:27:38	75.788	Report	
1.949 miles (3.137 km) layout
1998	June 28	24	Jeff Gordon	Hendrick Motorsports	Chevrolet	112	218.288 (351.3)	3:00:56	72.387	Report	
1999	June 27	24	Jeff Gordon	Hendrick Motorsports	Chevrolet	112	218.288 (351.3)	3:06:06	70.378	Report	
1.99 miles (3.20 km) layout
2000	June 25	24	Jeff Gordon	Hendrick Motorsports	Chevrolet	112	222.88 (358.69)	2:46:14	78.789	Report	
2 miles (3.2 km) layout
2001	June 24	20	Tony Stewart	Joe Gibbs Racing	Pontiac	112	224 (360.493)	2:57:06	75.889	Report	
1.99 miles (3.20 km) layout
2002	June 23	28	Ricky Rudd	Robert Yates Racing	Ford	110	218.9 (352.285)	2:42:08	81.007	Report	
2003	June 22	31	Robby Gordon	Richard Childress Racing	Chevrolet	110	218.9 (352.285)	2:57:55	73.821	Report	
2004	June 27	24	Jeff Gordon	Hendrick Motorsports	Chevrolet	110	218.9 (352.285)	2:49:34	77.456	Report	
2005	June 26	20	Tony Stewart	Joe Gibbs Racing	Chevrolet	110	218.9 (352.285)	3:00:18	72.845	Report	
2006	June 25	24	Jeff Gordon	Hendrick Motorsports	Chevrolet	110	218.9 (352.285)	2:57:36	73.953	Report	
2007	June 24	42	Juan Pablo Montoya	Chip Ganassi Racing	Dodge	110	218.9 (352.285)	2:56:11	74.547	Report	
2008	June 22	18	Kyle Busch	Joe Gibbs Racing	Toyota	112*	222.88 (358.69)	2:54:56	76.445	Report	
2009	June 21	9	Kasey Kahne	Richard Petty Motorsports	Dodge	113*	224.87 (361.893)	3:10:00	71.012	Report	
2010	June 20	48	Jimmie Johnson	Hendrick Motorsports	Chevrolet	110	218.9 (352.285)	2:56:38	74.357	Report	
2011	June 26	22	Kurt Busch	Penske Racing	Dodge	110	218.9 (352.285)	2:54:10	75.411	Report	
2012	June 24	15	Clint Bowyer	Michael Waltrip Racing	Toyota	112*	222.88 (358.69)	2:39:55	83.624	Report	
2013	June 23	56	Martin Truex Jr.	Michael Waltrip Racing	Toyota	110	218.9 (352.285)	2:51:20	76.658	Report	
2014	June 22	99	Carl Edwards	Roush Fenway Racing	Ford	110	218.9 (352.285)	2:51:30	76.583	Report	
2015	June 28	18	Kyle Busch	Joe Gibbs Racing	Toyota	110	218.9 (352.285)	2:55:39	74.774	Report	
2016	June 26	14	Tony Stewart	Stewart–Haas Racing	Chevrolet	110	218.9 (352.285)	2:42:13	80.966	Report	
2017	June 25	4	Kevin Harvick	Stewart–Haas Racing	Ford	110	218.9 (352.285)	2:46:52	78.71	Report	
2018	June 24	78	Martin Truex Jr.	Furniture Row Racing	Toyota	110	218.9 (352.285)	2:38:28	82.882	Report	
2.52 miles (4.06 km) layout
2019	June 23	19	Martin Truex Jr.	Joe Gibbs Racing	Toyota	90	226.8 (364.999)	2:42:09	83.922	Report	
2020*	Not held due to COVID-19 pandemic										
2021	June 6	5	Kyle Larson	Hendrick Motorsports	Chevrolet	92*	231.84 (373.11)	3:14:42	71.445	Report	
1.99 miles (3.20 km) layout
2022	June 12	99	Daniel Suárez	Trackhouse Racing	Chevrolet	110	218.9 (352.285)	2:48:22	78.008	Report	
2023	June 11	19	Martin Truex Jr.	Joe Gibbs Racing	Toyota	110	218.9 (352.285)	2:40:12	81.989	Report	
2024	June 9	5	Kyle Larson	Hendrick Motorsports	Chevrolet	110	218.9 (352.285)	2:56:14	74.526	Report	
2025	July 13	88	Shane van Gisbergen	Trackhouse Racing	Chevrolet	110	218.9 (352.285)	2:54:55	75.087	Report	
2026	June 28	97	Shane van Gisbergen	Trackhouse Racing	Chevrolet	110	218.9 (352.285)	2:37:53	83.188	Report	
2027	July 11									Report	

- 2008, 2009, 2012, and 2021: Race extended due to a NASCAR overtime finish.
- 2020: Race canceled and moved to Charlotte due to the COVID-19 pandemic.

=== Multiple winners (drivers) ===
# wins	Driver	Years won
5	Jeff Gordon	1998–2000, 2004, 2006
4	Martin Truex Jr.	2013, 2018–2019, 2023
3	Tony Stewart	2001, 2005, 2016
2	Ernie Irvan	1992, 1994
2	Rusty Wallace	1990, 1996
2	Ricky Rudd	1989, 2002
2	Kyle Busch	2008, 2015
2	Kyle Larson	2021, 2024
2	Shane van Gisbergen	2025–2026

=== Multiple winners (teams) ===
# wins	Team	Years won
8	Hendrick Motorsports	1998–2000, 2004, 2006, 2010, 2021, 2024
6	Joe Gibbs Racing	2001, 2005, 2008, 2015, 2019, 2023
3	Robert Yates Racing	1991, 1994, 2002
3	Trackhouse Racing	2022, 2025–2026
2	Richard Childress Racing	1995, 2003
2	Penske Racing	1996, 2011
2	Michael Waltrip Racing	2012–2013
2	Roush Fenway Racing	1997, 2014
2	Stewart–Haas Racing	2016–2017

=== Manufacturer wins ===
# wins	Manufacturer	Years won
16	Chevrolet	1992, 1995, 1998–2000, 2003–2006, 2010, 2016, 2021–2022, 2024-2026
8	Ford	1991, 1993–1994, 1996–1997, 2002, 2014, 2017
7	Toyota	2008, 2012–2013, 2015, 2018–2019, 2023
3	Dodge	2007, 2009, 2011
2	Pontiac	1990, 2001

=== USAC stock car NorCal 200 ===
- 1970 Roger McCluskey

== Race summaries ==
- 1989: Ricky Rudd won the inaugural race under King Racing, which proved to be his only victory of 1989.
- 1990: Rusty Wallace in his new No. 27 car won the race at Sonoma after Mark Martin got loose with three laps left.
- 1991: After Mark Martin and Tommy Kendall clashed, Davey Allison took the lead in a huge margin against Ricky Rudd. Ricky Rudd nonetheless caught up and in the final turn with 2 laps left, he spun Allison around. Allison contended second after turning a 180 to hold on to the second spot. Ricky Rudd led the final lap and in the final turn, he waved to his pit crew and gave the victory fist but was instead shown a black-flag at the last second. His furious pit crew retorted to NASCAR that it was plain racing but nonetheless Rudd was disqualified from his victory and put in second place behind the eventual winner Davey Allison.
- 1992: Ernie Irvan, who was black-flagged and given a stop-and-go penalty after the start of the race for jumping the start, wowed the fans by pulling up to the lead in the final laps to hold off Terry Labonte for the victory. The race was also notable for having been held just hours after the death of NASCAR founder Bill France Sr.
- 1993: Ernie Irvan dominated but in the final three laps he was passed by NASCAR veteran and popular driver, Geoff Bodine who held him off to win the race. This would be the last victory for the Bud Moore Engineering team and one of the last races for Bodine driving for the team before becoming a driver-owner after purchasing the assets of what had been Alan Kulwicki's team following the defending Winston Cup champions' death in an April 1, 1993 plane crash.
- 1994: Ernie Irvan dominated again and went on to win his second victory at Sonoma.
- 1995: Dale Earnhardt dominated the race and held off a close friend and rival Mark Martin to take the victory. This victory at Sonoma put Earnhardt in the lead of the championship standings which gave him popularity at Sonoma. It was Earnhardt's much sought after, first-ever (and only), Cup Series win on a road course.
- 1996: Again Mark Martin dominated but suffered heartbreak to fierce rival Rusty Wallace when Wallace passed Martin on a final restart to win the race.
- 1997: Mark Martin dominated and won the race after Jeff Gordon got loose in the final 5 laps.
- 1998: Jeff Gordon started on the front row, dominated nearly the entire race, and won his first Sonoma victory.
- 1999: Jeff Gordon again started on the front row and won after domination.
- 2000: Jeff Gordon started in 5th place which caused the fans to think his hopes of victory would not work. However, Gordon rushed up to the top spot on a first restart and dominated to win the race for a third consecutive time.
- 2001: This race was one of the first races in NASCAR where road course aces were among the Cup drivers who were serious threats to win. Jeff Gordon won the pole and led the early portions of the race. After pitting, Canadian road ringer Ron Fellows led the most laps of the race, leading over 20 laps. However, Fellows lost his shot at the win through an untimely yellow with less than 57 laps to go. The final 30 laps found one-off road course ringer Robby Gordon (The two Gordons are not related) dominating. Robby Gordon had been fired from his team in spring 2001 and was racing only on rare occasions. Robby Gordon hoped to win in order to find a new ride. After Gordon spent too much time battling a lapped Kevin Harvick to keep Harvick a lap down, Tony Stewart got by Robby Gordon for the lead and stole away the victory.
- 2002: Jeff Gordon dominated, but under a final caution he pitted and Jerry Nadeau took the lead by not pitting with 19 laps to go. Nadeau led 22 laps driving for Petty Enterprises. With 2 laps to go his car engine blew and he stalled in a pullover-site to avoid causing a caution. Ricky Rudd crossed the finish line first and this time he got to keep his victory, and it was also his final Cup win of his career. Nadeau finished 34th after another near-miss in less than 9 months (Nadeau ran out of gas on the final lap of the 2001 NAPA 500 at Atlanta).
- 2003: Robby Gordon ended Jeff Gordon's domination streak by dominating the race in his No. 31 team he had driven for since 2001. On lap 43, Robby Gordon and his RCR teammate Kevin Harvick got loose racing side-by-side which nearly gave the win away to Ron Fellows. Fellows controlled the race from then until an untimely caution at lap 72 and losing any shot at winning with a spin with less than 20 laps left. Coming to the caution on lap 72, Robby Gordon passed Kevin Harvick in turn 11, violating a non-written gentlemen agreement to not pass under yellow. Robby Gordon went on to win.
- 2004: Jeff Gordon dominated again and won the race with help from his teammate/student driver Jimmie Johnson who had pushed him on a late restart. The win was overshadowed by an altercation between Tony Stewart and Brian Vickers. Tony Stewart had retaliated against Brian Vickers on lap 85 for prior contact and on pit road, Tony Stewart smacked Vickers. For his part, Tony Stewart was fined $50000 and put on probation for the rest of the year.
- 2005: Tony Stewart showed his skills at Sonoma and held off Sonoma's favorite, Ricky Rudd to take his second Sonoma victory. Stewart later became the next person after Robby Gordon to win both road course races in one NSCS season. Road ringer Brian Simo drove in this race for Richard Childress Racing and recorded his only top-ten finish, finishing 10th.
- 2006: Jeff Gordon again amazed the audience by dominating and winning his 5th Sonoma race. The biggest highlight was Terry Labonte finishing 3rd in a new single-car team-the No. 96 for Hall of Fame Racing.
- 2007: Jamie McMurray won the pole position and Robby Gordon led the most laps. However, the final laps saw Jamie McMurray back on the lead. With 8 laps to go Jamie McMurray was passed by a bitter rival; the cup rookie Juan Pablo Montoya. The final 10 laps both McMurray and Montoya were in fuel mileage drama and RCR driver Kevin Harvick (The Daytona 500 winner of 2007) who had enough fuel to make it; was gaining on them. McMurray later ran out of gas, in turn, one with three laps to go and slowed down giving up second place and ending up 37th because he ran out of gas just past pit road. Montoya never gave up his lead and amazed the racing world by stretching off his fuel crisis to win the race. RCR finished an amazing three in a row with Harvick in second place, Jeff Burton in third, and Clint Bowyer in fourth place.
- 2008: Kyle Busch started a road course sweep in 2008 by winning at Sonoma for his first road course victory. He later became the next person after Tony Stewart to sweep both road course races with a victory. Marcos Ambrose had his first NSCS start in this race and had contention to win but crashed with Elliott Sadler with 25 laps left. David Gilliland matched his best career finish, finishing second behind Busch.
- 2009: Kasey Kahne dominated the race and held off Tony Stewart and Marcos Ambrose for his first road course victory in NASCAR.
- 2010: Due to fuel concerns, leader Marcos Ambrose stopped in turn 1 during a late caution. He drove back to the lead, but was discovered to have violated the rule of maintaining speed under caution, causing him to be reset by NASCAR in 7th, costing him a shot at his first Cup victory; he finished 6th. Jimmie Johnson nabbed the lead thanks to the debacle and scored his first career road course win. As a result of his loss, Ambrose announced his decision to leave JTG-Daughtery Racing after 2010 to race under the renamed Petty Enterprises; Richard Petty Motorsports. Boris Said had his first top-ten finish since 2007's Sonoma race, finishing 8th in the new Latitude 43 Motorsports car.
- 2011: In one of the most action-filled races of the event, after a repeat of history from 2004; a vicious fight between Tony Stewart and Brian Vickers (in which Vickers' retaliation on Smoke saw the number 14 propped on the tire wall at the hairpin), Kurt Busch dominated and won his first road course victory leading 76 laps in total.
- 2012: Clint Bowyer dominated the race and won his first road course victory and one of Michael Waltrip Racing's first biggest victories in their career. It was also the first victory on a road course for MWR. This victory and a few others in 2012 showed that Bowyer would be a contender for victory even though he left legendary RCR to an underrated MWR team. Phoenix Racing had its greatest NSCS finish since its first win in 2009 at Talladega, with Kurt Busch the defending race winner who ended up in third place for his first top-five of 2012's NASCAR season. Kurt almost got second but Tony slipped by Kurt on the final lap for the second place his first top-five since his 2011 fall Dover win.

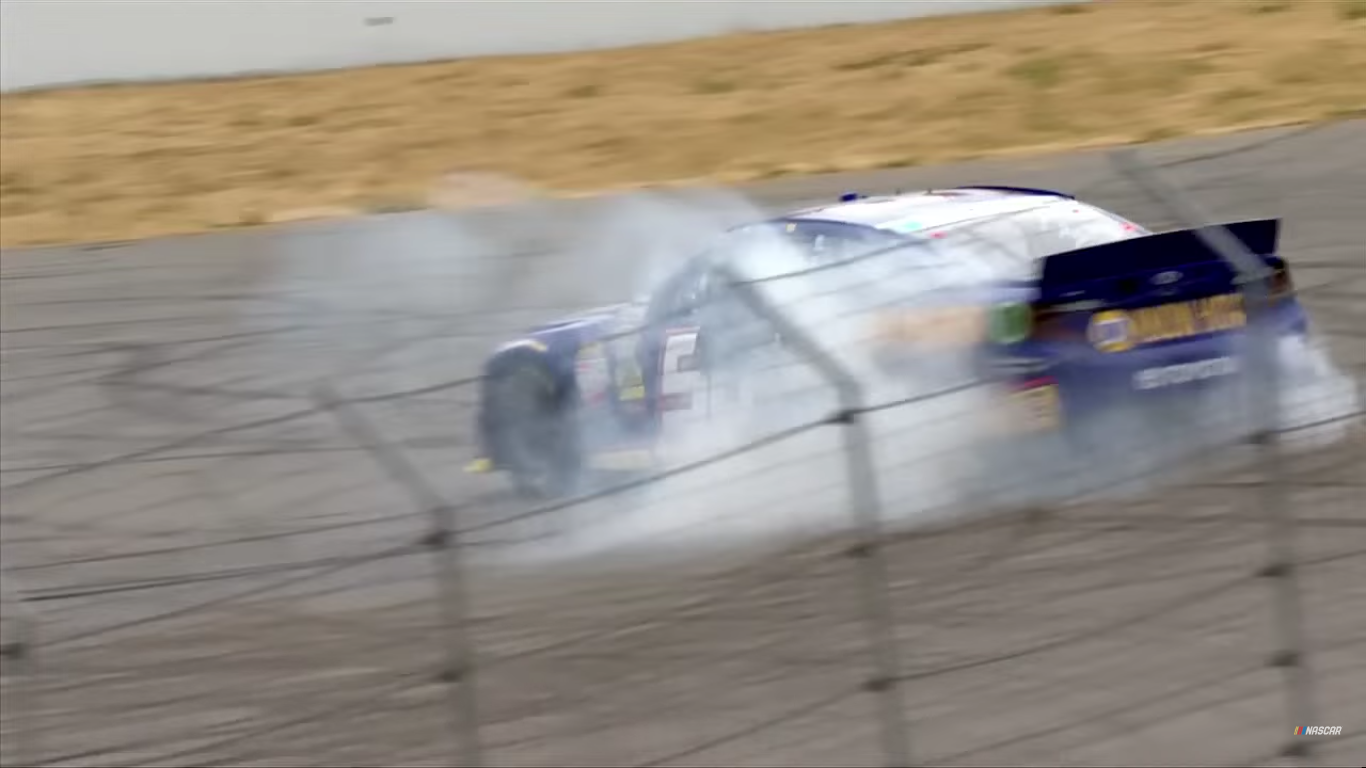
Martin Truex Jr. celebrates his second Cup Series win.

- 2013: Marcos Ambrose led the first quarter against pole-sitter Jamie McMurray. After pit stops and penalties for other drivers, Martin Truex Jr. went upfront. Eventually, the lead was traded with Juan Pablo Montoya, among other drivers. With 22 laps left, Martin Truex Jr. went back up front and held off Jeff Gordon to win his second NSCS win and his first since Dover in 2007. While Truex celebrated an emotional victory MWR got two in a row owner wins at Sonoma, and Kurt Busch was praised by the drivers for recovering from two speeding penalties to finish in the top five. Drivers such as Ron Fellows, Boris Said, and Jacques Villeneuve returned to NASCAR to race at Sonoma.
- 2014: A. J. Allmendinger led the most laps of 35 and appeared to probably have a sure victory in his hand. He was driving the No. 47 car which nearly won the 2010 race. However, he got tapped from behind by Dale Earnhardt Jr. which put him out of chances of a win. Carl Edwards ended up going on to win the race against Jeff Gordon who finished second for the second consecutive time. Boris Said and Tomy Drissi were the only road ringers who raced in this event.
- 2015: The race was aired on FS1 for the first time after eight years on TNT, A. J. Allmendinger won the pole. Kurt Busch and Jimmie Johnson both dominated the race. With five laps to go, Kyle Busch, driving while recovering from a broken leg from the Xfinity series event at Daytona, drove past Johnson and pulled away from brother Kurt. Kurt was unable to close the gap and Kyle won, the first 1–2 finish for the Busch brothers. Boris Said was the only road course ringer in the event.
- 2016: Carl Edwards put his car on pole and led the early laps. Allmendinger, who started second, ran up front for most of the first 40 laps, leading 20 of the first 40 laps. However, a pit road penalty for an uncontrolled tire cost Allmendinger his shot at victory. Denny Hamlin led the midpoint of the race while Tony Stewart anticipated a caution and pitted with less than 30 laps to go. Tony's pit stop paid off as the caution came out just after he pitted and he went up front to lead the final 20 laps and hold off a hard-charging Hamlin for the win, ending a three-year winless streak. The only road course ringer in the race was semi-retired Patrick Carpentier who was driving the #32 Can-Am car. It would be one of the most popular wins of 2016 as it was Stewart's final year of NASCAR competition as a driver, as it became his 49th and final win.
- 2017: For the first time since 2014, the field involved multiple road course ringers such as Billy Johnson, Kevin O'Connell, Alon Day, Tommy Regan, Boris Said, and Josh Bilicki, although they were not serious threats to win. The race was primarily a duel between guys such as Martin Truex Jr., Kevin Harvick, Brad Keselowski, Jimmie Johnson, Kyle Busch, and Denny Hamlin, with Truex leading the most laps. After Truex's engine blew up on lap 86 while leading the race, the lead went to Kevin Harvick who led the final 22 laps to win the race over teammate Clint Bowyer.
- 2018: Martin Truex Jr. and Kevin Harvick were the dominant cars. Kyle Larson won the pole but Harvick and Truex were the class of the field. Truex went on to win the race for his second Sonoma victory, in a mostly caution-free race. Tomy Drissi and Justin Marks were the only road course ringers in the race.
- 2019: Truex defended his 2018 win in NASCAR's return to running the full-length course, holding off Kyle Busch for the win. This was the first Sonoma race since 1995 that there were no "road course specialists" in the race. This was also the final race to feature Darrell Waltrip as color commentator, as he left the FOX booth following the 2019 season.
- 2022: After the previous two races were held on the full course, NASCAR returned to using the club circuit layout. Daniel Suárez dominated the second half of the race to claim his first ever NASCAR Cup Series win.

Previous race: Iowa Corn 350	NASCAR Cup Series; Toyota/Save Mart 350	Next race: Dollar Tree 400
