= Naturally Fresh, Inc. =

American condiment company

- Type: Private
- Industry: Food Manufacture
- Founded: Atlanta, Georgia, U.S. (1966)
- Headquarters: Atlanta, Georgia, U.S.
- Number of locations: 1 manufacturing plant and 22 distribution facilities
- Key people: W. Spence Richardson, Plant Manager; Steve Loftus, General Manager; Michael (Mike) White, SVP, Sales and Marketing
- Products: Dips, Marinades, Salad Dressings, Syrups and Sauces
- Parent: TreeHouse Foods
- Website: http://www.naturallyfresh.com/

Naturally Fresh, Inc. is a producer of dressings, sauces, marinades, dips, oils, and vinegar. The company also manufactures dressings, sauces and dips for a number of different restaurants and institutions, including Hooters. It is currently one of the largest manufacturers of sauces and salad dressings in the United States.

== History ==
Naturally Fresh was founded in 1966 as Eastern Foods by Robert H. Brooks, the founder of Hooters of America, to sell non-dairy creamer to the airline industry. In 1980, Eastern Foods launched the Naturally Fresh brand and in 2002 the company name was changed to reflect the brand.

In 2003, Robert retired and named his son Coby G. Brooks President and CEO. After Robert's death in 2006, Coby gained a controlling, but not majority, interest in Hooters and Naturally Fresh, Inc. This left him embroiled in a dispute with his father's widow Tami over distribution of the father's estate as Robert left in his will 30% of his estate to Coby, 30% to his underage daughter Boni Bell, 10% to Clemson University, and 30% to other family members. Tami was bequeathed $1 million per year for 20 years. However she sued the estate for the ⅓ share of the estate that would be due her under South Carolina's elective share law. In 2009 Coby and Tami settled for an undisclosed amount, but that settlement has forced Coby to seek outside investors.

Naturally Fresh was purchased in 2012 by TreeHouse Foods.

== In popular culture ==
On February 14, 2010 Coby appeared on an episode of the CBS reality TV show Undercover Boss. On Day 5 he worked in the Naturally Fresh factory in Atlanta where he was told by one employee that the company had gone downhill since his father died.
