= Bill Terry (NASCAR owner) =

NASCAR car owner

Bill Terry is a former NASCAR car owner. His cars raced in NASCAR between 1982 and 1986. He is best known for offering Alan Kulwicki a ride in his car, which led to Kulwicki racing for Terry during five races in 1985 and fourteen in 1986. Terry left the sport at that time. Kulwicki bought Terry's equipment and used it for the rest of the season to win the 1986 Winston Cup Series Rookie of the Year. Kulwicki later became the 1992 NASCAR Winston Cup Series champion. Other drivers to race for Terry include Tommy Ellis, Bob Jarvis, Butch Lindley and Bosco Lowe.

Kulwicki had three top-tens and one top-five finish for Terry in 1986.
