= Victory lap =

Lap around a track after race completion

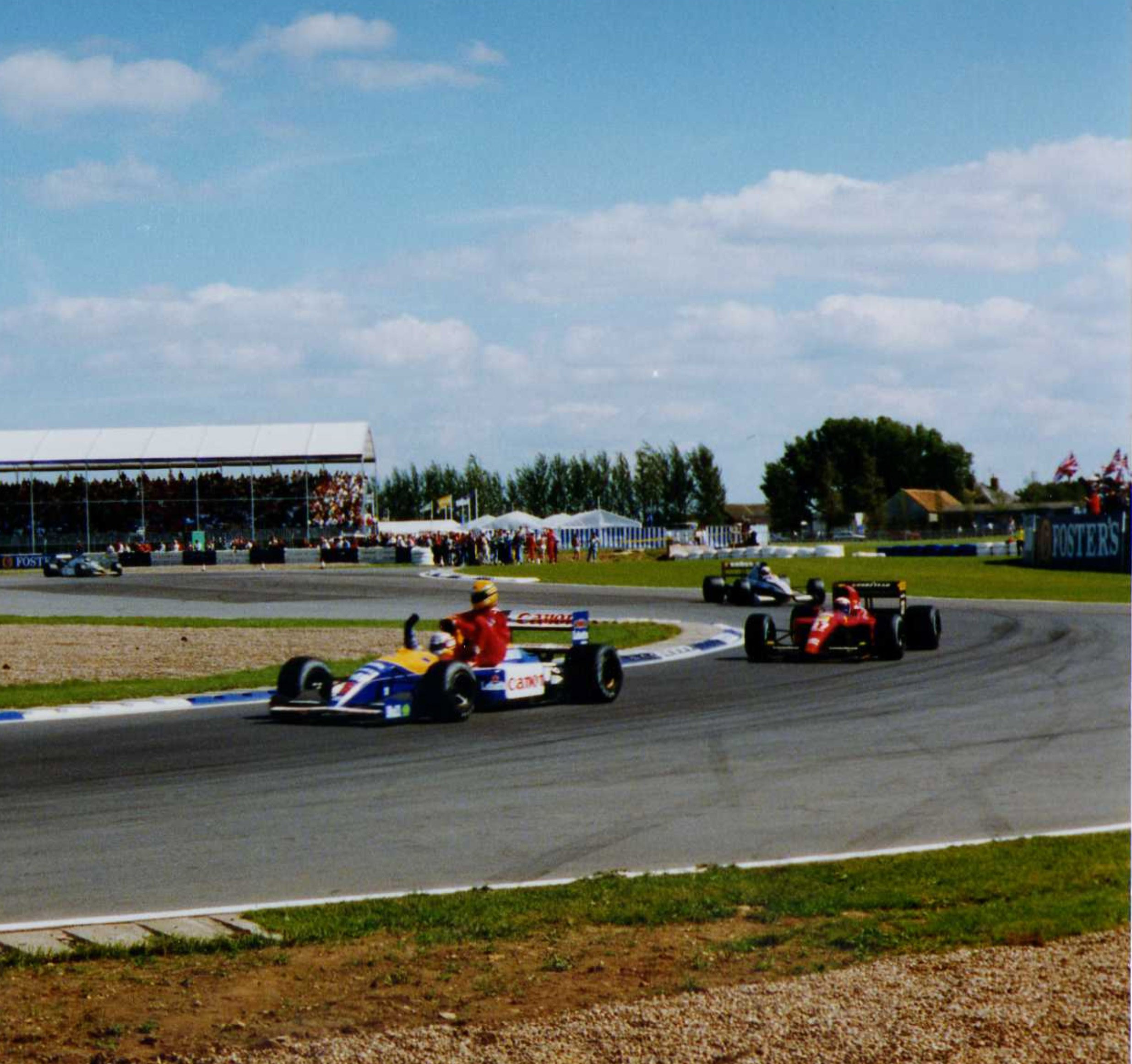
Nigel Mansell gives Ayrton Senna a lift back to the pits on his victory lap after winning the 1991 British Grand Prix.

Victory lap at the 2015 Punta del Este ePrix.

A victory lap (also lap of honor) is a term used in motorsports to describe an extra lap of the race track after the conclusion of a race. This lap, driven at reduced speed, allows the winning driver to celebrate their victory and gives the spectators an opportunity to congratulate and honor the competitors. Commonly, trackside flag marshals will wave their flags in a gesture known as the FIA salute or the Monkey Dance in the US. It is not uncommon for marshals to clap or wave their hands at drivers as a gesture and sometimes the drivers wave back in response.

Victory laps can sometimes become dangerous for the winner and the other drivers, since in many tracks the safety nets can be easily climbed over by the crowd, which then becomes an obstacle for the racers.

Victory laps have regularly seen drivers who have retired in the final stages of a race being given a lift back to the pits on one of their competitors' cars. Some notable examples in Formula One include Riccardo Patrese and Didier Pironi at the 1982 Monaco Grand Prix, Nigel Mansell and Ayrton Senna at the 1991 British Grand Prix (pictured), Jean Alesi and Michael Schumacher at the 1995 Canadian Grand Prix, Michael Schumacher and Giancarlo Fisichella at the 1997 German Grand Prix, Mika Häkkinen and David Coulthard at the 2001 Spanish Grand Prix, and Mark Webber and Fernando Alonso at the 2011 German Grand Prix and 2013 Singapore Grand Prix and Sebastian Vettel and Pascal Wehrlein at the 2017 Malaysian Grand Prix.

Since the mid-2000s, the FIA, motorsports' global governing body, has restricted what a Formula One driver may do on his victory lap. The sporting regulations state that at the end of a race, "all cars must proceed on the circuit directly to the post race parc fermé without stopping, without overtaking (unless clearly necessary), without receiving any object whatsoever and without any assistance (except that of the marshals if necessary)", although this rule has rarely been enforced, such as Felipe Massa taking a Brazilian flag following his victory at the 2006 Brazilian Grand Prix, and more recently Lewis Hamilton taking a British flag following his controversial victory at the 2021 British Grand Prix. It is also commonplace to see drivers overtaking on the victory lap, as well as drivers stopping to conserve a one-litre fuel sample required for post-race inspection, amongst other reasons.

== Polish victory lap ==
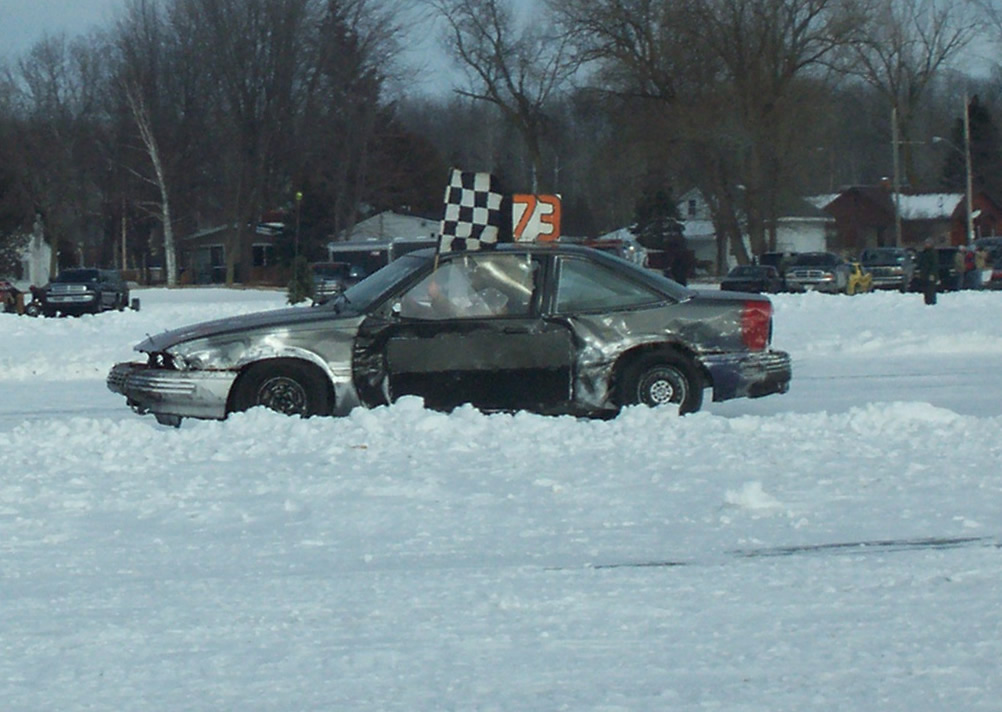
A winning ice racing driver taking a Polish victory lap on a frozen Wisconsin lake

A Polish victory lap or Kulwicki victory lap entails the driver turning his car around and driving in the opposite direction, which is clockwise on NASCAR ovals. It has been used in road courses.

This style of victory lap is common in local short track or dirt track races, where the victorious driver takes the checkered flag from the flag stand, and then proceeds to drive with the driver's side of the car facing the fans for their victory lap.

The term was first coined as a result of Polish American Alan Kulwicki's celebration of his first career Winston Cup victory at the Checker 500 (Phoenix) on November 6, 1988. He celebrated his victory by driving a clockwise victory lap. Kulwicki first became familiar with the practice after meetings with Midwest dirt track racer Fred Zack, who had been performing the backwards lap for many years prior. A Ford engineer slapped him on the back and asked if that was a "Polish" victory lap. Kulwicki's only other Polish victory lap came in 1992, in celebration of his Winston Cup Championship at the 1992 Hooters 500.

The term was solidified after Kulwicki's death in a plane crash on Thursday, April 1, 1993, near Blountville, Tennessee. Hours after Kulwicki's death, Peter Jellen drove Kulwicki's racecar hauler counter-clockwise around Bristol Motor Speedway before leaving the track. Two days after Kulwicki's death, Bristol Busch Series race winner Michael Waltrip honored his old short track foe by turning Kulwicki's trademark reverse Polish victory lap, but only half a lap, stating that he did not want to do Kulwicki's entire routine. The next day, Winston Cup winner Rusty Wallace followed Waltrip's lead, and proceeded to run a full Polish victory lap, both after that race, and after each victory for the rest of the 1993 season. Tom Roberts, Wallace's and sponsor Miller Brewing's publicist, was also Kulwicki's publicist. In addition, most winners for the remainder of the 1993 season honored Kulwicki with a Polish victory lap. On November 14, 1993, after the Hooters 500 (Atlanta), the last race of that season, the race winner Wallace and 1993 series champion Dale Earnhardt ran a Polish victory lap together while carrying #7 and #28 flags commemorating Kulwicki and Davey Allison, respectively.

Mike Joy frequently refers to this as an "Alan Kulwicki victory lap" in memory of the driver, and noted the spectators see the driver, who usually waves and sometimes has his helmet off, as he salutes the fans. Joy's term is reminiscent of other cases where a term is named for the person who developed the idea (i.e., Gurney flap, Petty bar). Many local racetrack winners and series champions have saluted Kulwicki or his underdog spirit with a Polish victory lap, especially in his home state of Wisconsin. 2006 Milwaukee race winner Paul Menard (a Wisconsinite) celebrated his first Busch Series win with a Polish victory lap.

Dale Earnhardt Jr. did a Polish victory lap after winning the 2001 MBNA Cal Ripken Jr. 400 at Dover Downs International Speedway in the first NASCAR Winston Cup Race following the September 11 attacks while holding a large American flag out the driver's side window.

Jimmie Johnson celebrated a special win by doing a Polish victory lap on October 31, 2004, after winning the 2004 Bass Pro Shops MBNA 500 at Atlanta Motor Speedway. The week before on October 24, tragedy struck when a Hendrick Motorsports airplane crashed outside of Martinsville, Virginia.

Kurt Busch celebrated his 2005 win at Phoenix with a Polish victory lap. Busch watched his first NASCAR races at the track, and wanted to honor Kulwicki. Kyle Busch also did a Polish victory lap after his 2009 NASCAR Sprint Cup win at Bristol, while Kurt repeated the act at that year's Atlanta race when he put his car in reverse, a practice dubbed "The Unwind Lap".

In 2012, Tony Stewart did a Polish victory lap after finally winning for the first time at Las Vegas Motor Speedway in the Kobalt Tools 400.

In 2014, Earnhardt Jr. celebrated his Daytona 500 victory with a Polish victory lap. His second win of the 2014 season came on June 8 at Pocono, where he repeated it. He also performed the feat after winning the Goody's Headache Relief Shot 500 in October.

In 2015, Denny Hamlin celebrated his Xfinity Series win in his home state track at Richmond International Raceway with a Polish victory lap, and completing it while performing a burnout.

In the 2020 Season Finale 500, Johnson's final race as a full-time driver, he performed a Polish victory lap after finishing fifth as the highest non-championship-round driver.

In the 2026 FireKeepers Casino 400 race, Hamlin would perform a Polish victory lap after his victory while displaying a number 18 flag in tribute of fellow driver and longtime Joe Gibbs Racing teammate Kyle Busch, who died two weeks earlier and whose record of 63 Cup Series victories Hamlin tied with his victory.
