= Tony Gibson (auto racing) =

American NASCAR crew chief (born 1964)

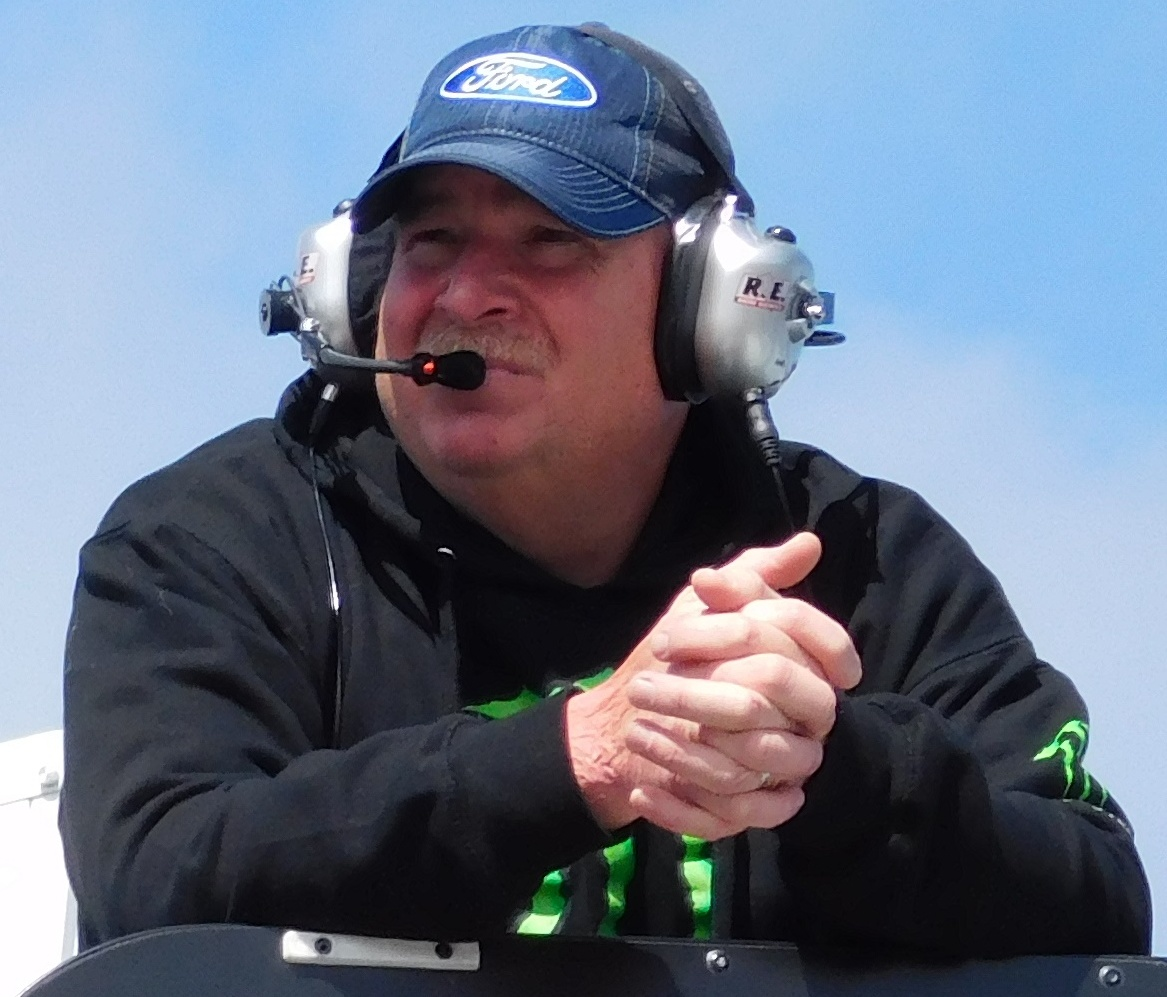
- Gibson at Martinsville Speedway in 2017

Personal information
- Born: November 3, 1964 (age 61) Daytona Beach, Florida, U.S.

Sport
- Country: United States
- Sport: NASCAR Monster Energy Cup Series
- Team: 41. Stewart–Haas Racing

Tony Gibson (born November 3, 1964) is an American former auto racing crew chief. He last worked for the #41 Stewart–Haas Racing Ford driven by Kurt Busch in the NASCAR Monster Energy NASCAR Cup Series. He was the crew chief for Busch's 2017 Daytona 500 victory. Gibson worked as car chief on Alan Kulwicki’s title team of 1992 and was also the car chief on Jeff Gordon’s title teams of 1998 and 2001. With Dale Earnhardt Incorporated, Gibson, was the crew chief for racers such as Steve Park, Michael Waltrip, Dale Earnhardt Jr., Mark Martin and at Stewart–Haas Racing for Ryan Newman from 2009 to the majority of 2012 and Danica Patrick for 2013 to most of 2014 before swapping drivers.

== Early life ==
Gibson was born in Daytona Beach, Florida, United States. He, along with his father, built and maintained cars with his brother Mark as the driver. The Gibson family found success at short tracks around central Florida and even won a 1978 track championship at New Smyrna Speedway.

Gibson graduated from Spruce Creek High School in 1982.

While attending Daytona Beach Community College, Gibson continued to race with his family but after graduating with a Tool and Die making degree, he moved to North Carolina to pursue a NASCAR career.

== Racing career ==
Gibson started in the 1980s hanging car bodies for various NASCAR Grand National and Winston Cup Series teams. While working as a body hanger he was befriended by Alan Kulwicki, a driver and owner in the Winston Cup Series, who was working in a nearby shop space. This led to Gibson becoming a mechanic on Kulwicki's team in 1986. Kulwicki's underdog team achieved a surprising Winston Cup championship win in 1992 with Gibson as car chief.

After Kulwicki's death in 1993, until 1995, Gibson worked for former champion Bill Elliott helping him win the 1994 Southern 500 at Darlington. From 1998 to 2001, Hendrick Motorsports hired Gibson to work on the No. 24 car with driver Jeff Gordon. In his first year with Hendrick, he scored 13 wins and the 1998 Winston Cup title. In his last season, he scored six wins and the 2001 Winston Cup title. The combination scored a total of 29 victories, and two championships in four years.

Gibson moved to Dale Earnhardt Inc. in 2002 where he worked various roles. As a crew chief he worked with Steve Park and later Michael Waltrip. In 2005, he moved to the car chief position for Dale Earnhardt Jr. and later worked as his crew chief for 12 races in 2007. Gibson moved over to Dale Earnhardt Inc.’s No. 8 Chevrolet, in 2008, driven part-time by Mark Martin and rookie Aric Almirola. His first full season as a Sprint Cup crew chief saw him help earn four top-fives and 12 top-ten finishes.

A new race team, Stewart–Haas Racing, created by a joint venture between Tony Stewart and Gene Haas, hired Gibson to lead the #39 of Ryan Newman. A decision to pit for just two tires led to his first victory with Newman on April 10, 2010 in the Subway Fresh Fit 600 at Phoenix.

In 2017, Gibson was the winning crew chief at the Daytona 500, with Kurt Busch winning the race.

In 2018, Gibson came out of retirement and became the crew chief for the 4 of Kevin Harvick after crew chief Rodney Childers got suspended for the final two races of the season due to a L1 spoiler penalty.
