= Alan Kulwicki =

American racing driver (1954–1993)

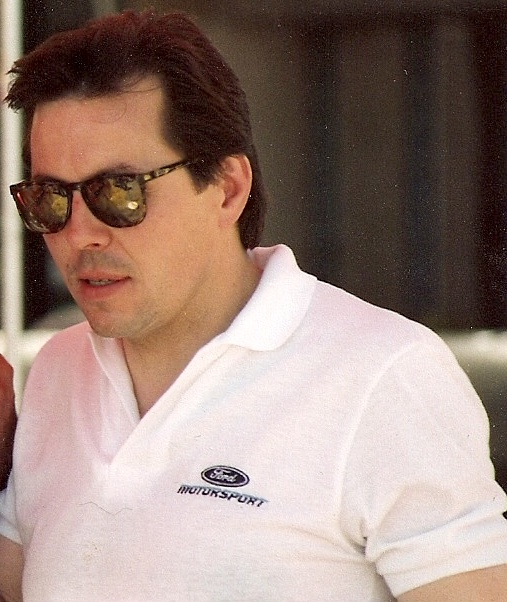
- Kulwicki at Sears Point in 1991
- Born: Alan Dennis Kulwicki; December 14, 1954; Greenfield, Wisconsin, U.S.
- Died: April 1, 1993 (aged 38) near Blountville, Tennessee, U.S.
- Cause of death: Airplane crash
- Achievements: 1992 NASCAR Winston Cup Series Champion; 1981 Slinger Nationals Winner
- Awards: 1986 Winston Cup Series Rookie of the Year; Named one of NASCAR's 50 Greatest Drivers (1998); NASCAR Hall of Fame (2019); International Motorsports Hall of Fame (2002); Inducted in the National Motorsports Press Association's Hall of Fame; Bristol Motor Speedway's Heroes of Bristol Hall of Fame (1997); Lowe's Motor Speedway's Court of Legends (1993); Talladega-Texaco Hall of Fame (1996); Named one of NASCAR's 75 Greatest Drivers (2023)

NASCAR Cup Series career
- 207 races run over 9 years
- Best finish: 1st (1992)
- First race: 1985 Wrangler SanforSet 400 (Richmond)
- Last race: 1993 TranSouth 500 (Darlington)
- First win: 1988 Checker 500 (Phoenix)
- Last win: 1992 Champion Spark Plug 500 (Pocono)
Wins	Top tens	Poles
5	75	24

NASCAR O'Reilly Auto Parts Series career
- 6 races run over 2 years
- Best finish: 50th (1984)
- First race: 1984 Red Carpet 200 (Milwaukee)
- Last race: 1985 Milwaukee Sentinel 200 (Milwaukee)
Wins	Top tens	Poles
0	3	1

Alan Dennis Kulwicki (December 14, 1954 – April 1, 1993), nicknamed "Special K" and "the Polish Prince", was an American auto racing driver and team owner with Polish origin. He started racing at local short tracks in Wisconsin before moving up to regional stock car touring series. Kulwicki arrived at NASCAR, the highest and most expensive level of stock car racing in the United States, with no sponsor, a limited budget and only a racecar and a borrowed pickup truck. Despite starting with meager equipment and finances, he earned the 1986 NASCAR Rookie of the Year award over drivers racing for well-funded teams.

After Kulwicki won his first race at Phoenix International Raceway, he debuted what would become his trademark "Polish victory lap". Kulwicki won the 1992 Winston Cup Championship by what was then the closest margin in NASCAR history. He died early in 1993 in a light aircraft accident and therefore never defended his championship. He has been inducted into numerous racing halls of fame and was named one of NASCAR's 50 greatest drivers. Despite 5 wins in the Cup Series and the 1992 Championship, Kulwicki never won a Daytona 500.

Kulwicki was known for being a perfectionist and doing things his own way. An engineer by trade, his scientific approach to NASCAR racing inspired the way teams are now run. Despite lucrative offers from top car owners, he insisted on driving for his own race team, AK Racing, during most of his NASCAR career. Described by his publicist as "a real hard type of person to get to know", he remained a bachelor throughout his life.

== Early life ==
Kulwicki grew up in Greenfield, Wisconsin, a suburb of Milwaukee known for its Polish-American neighborhoods, near the Milwaukee Mile racetrack. After his mother died, his family moved in with his grandmother, who died when Kulwicki was in seventh grade. A year later, his only brother died of a hemophilia-related illness. Kulwicki attended Pius XI High School, a Catholic high school in Milwaukee and received a Bachelor of Science degree in mechanical engineering from the University of Wisconsin–Milwaukee in 1977.

Kulwicki's knowledge of engineering has been cited as a contributing factor to his success as a driver, as it helped him better understand the physics of a racecar. He first raced on local tracks as an amateur while in college before becoming a full-time professional racer in 1980.

== Personal life ==
A devout Catholic, Kulwicki always competed with a Saint Christopher (the patron saint of travelers) devotional medal in his car.

== Early racing career ==
Kulwicki began his racing career as a 13-year-old kart racer. His father built engines as the crew chief for Norm Nelson and Roger McCluskey's United States Automobile Club (USAC) racecars. Because his work involved travel, Kulwicki's father was unable to help his son at most kart races, so Kulwicki's resourcefulness was often tested trying to find someone to transport his kart to the track. Even when Kulwicki asked his father for advice, he typically ended up doing most of the work himself. "I showed him how", Gerry Kulwicki said. "And he said: 'Why don't you do it? You can do it better.' And I said, 'Well, if you do it for a while, you can do it better.'"

Many local-level American racetracks host their own season championships. In Wisconsin, numerous locations held dirt and asphalt short track racing. Kulwicki started driving stock cars at the local level at the Hales Corners Speedway and Cedarburg Speedway dirt oval tracks. In 1973 he won the rookie of the year award at Hales Corners and the next year started racing late models – the fastest and most complicated type of stock cars raced at the local level – at the same track. That season, he won his first feature race, at Leo's Speedway in Oshkosh.

Kulwicki moved from dirt tracks to paved tracks in 1977. He also teamed up with racecar builder Greg Krieger to research, model, engineer and construct an innovative car with far more torsional stiffness than other late models. The increased stiffness allowed the car to handle better in the corners, which increased its speed. Racing at Slinger Super Speedway, he won the track championship in 1977. In 1978, Kulwicki returned to Slinger; that same year he started racing a late model at Wisconsin International Raceway (WIR), finishing third in points in his rookie season at the track. In 1979 and 1980, he won the WIR late model track championships.

In 1979, Kulwicki began competing in regional to national level events sanctioned by the USAC Stock Car series and the American Speed Association (ASA), while remaining an amateur racer through 1980. When Kulwicki raced against future NASCAR champion Rusty Wallace in the ASA series, the two became friends. Kulwicki's highest finish in the ASA season points championship was third place, which he accomplished in both 1982 and 1985, with five career victories and twelve pole positions.

== NASCAR ==
=== Early 1980s ===
Kulwicki raced in four NASCAR Busch Grand National Series (now O’Reilly’s Auto Parts Series) races in 1984. At the time, the Busch Grand National Series was considered NASCAR's feeder circuit, a proving ground for drivers who wished to step up to the organization's premiere circuit, the Winston Cup (now NASCAR Cup Series). Kulwicki qualified second fastest and finished in second place at his first career NASCAR race, which took place at the Milwaukee Mile, several city blocks from where he grew up. Later that year, he finished seventh at Charlotte and fifth at Bristol. The following year, Kulwicki placed sixteenth in the season-opening Busch Series race at Daytona. Although he won the pole position at that year's event in Milwaukee, he finished fourteenth because of engine problems. Kulwicki's Busch Series successes caught car owner Bill Terry's eye and he offered Kulwicki a chance to race for him in several Winston Cup events.

In 1985, Kulwicki sold most of his belongings, including his short track racing equipment, to move approximately 860 miles (1,380 km) to the Charlotte area in North Carolina. He kept only a few things; his pickup truck was loaded to tow a trailer full of furniture and tools. An electrical fire two days before he left destroyed his truck, so Kulwicki had to borrow one to pull the trailer. After arriving in the Charlotte area, he showed up unannounced at Terry's shop ready to race. Veteran NASCAR drivers were initially amused by Kulwicki's arrival on the national tour: He was a driver from the northern United States when the series was primarily a southern regional series, he had a mechanical engineering degree when few other drivers had completed college and, with only six starts, had limited driving experience in the junior Busch Series. Kulwicki was described as very studious, hard working, no-nonsense and something of a loner. He frequently walked the garage area in his racing uniform carrying a briefcase. Kulwicki made his first career Winston Cup start at Richmond on September 8, 1985, for Bill Terry's No. 32 Hardee's Ford team. That season he competed in five races for Terry, with his highest finish being thirteenth.

=== 1986–1989 ===
Kulwicki started his rookie season in 1986 with Terry, who switched his car number from 32 to 35 and had received sponsorship from the restaurant chain Quincy's Steak House. After Terry decided to end support for his racing team mid-season, he sold the team to his driver. Kulwicki as an owner started out as essentially a one-man team, as he had to serve as driver, team administrator, crew chief and chief mechanic. Kulwicki had difficulty acquiring and keeping crew members because he found it difficult to trust them to do the job with the excellence that he demanded and because he was hands-on in the maintenance of racecars to the point of being a "control freak". He sought out crew members who had owned their own racecars, believing they would understand what he was going through: working long hours and performing his own car maintenance with a very limited budget. Notable crew members include his crew chief, Paul Andrews and future Cup crew chiefs, Tony Gibson and Brian Whitesell. Future crew chief and owner, Ray Evernham, lasted six weeks with Kulwicki in 1992. Evernham later said, "The man was a genius. There's no question. It's not a matter of people just feeling like he was a genius. That man was a genius. But his personality paid for that. He was very impatient, very straightforward, very cut-to-the-bone." With one car, two engines, and two full-time crew members, Kulwicki won the 1986 Winston Cup Rookie of the Year award. He had competed in 23 of 29 events, with four top-ten finishes, three races not completed (Did Not Finish – DNF), an average finish of 15.4, and had only one result below thirtieth place. Kulwicki finished 21st in the Winston Cup points standings for the season.

For the 1987 season, Kulwicki secured primary sponsorship from Zerex Antifreeze and changed his car number to seven. He picked up his first career pole position in the season's third race, at Richmond. Later that season, he again qualified fastest at Richmond and Dover. Kulwicki came close to winning his first Winston Cup race at Pocono, finishing second after winner Dale Earnhardt passed him on the last lap. With nine top-ten finishes, eleven DNFs and an average finish of 18.2 in 29 events; Kulwicki finished fifteenth in the Winston Cup points standings for the season.

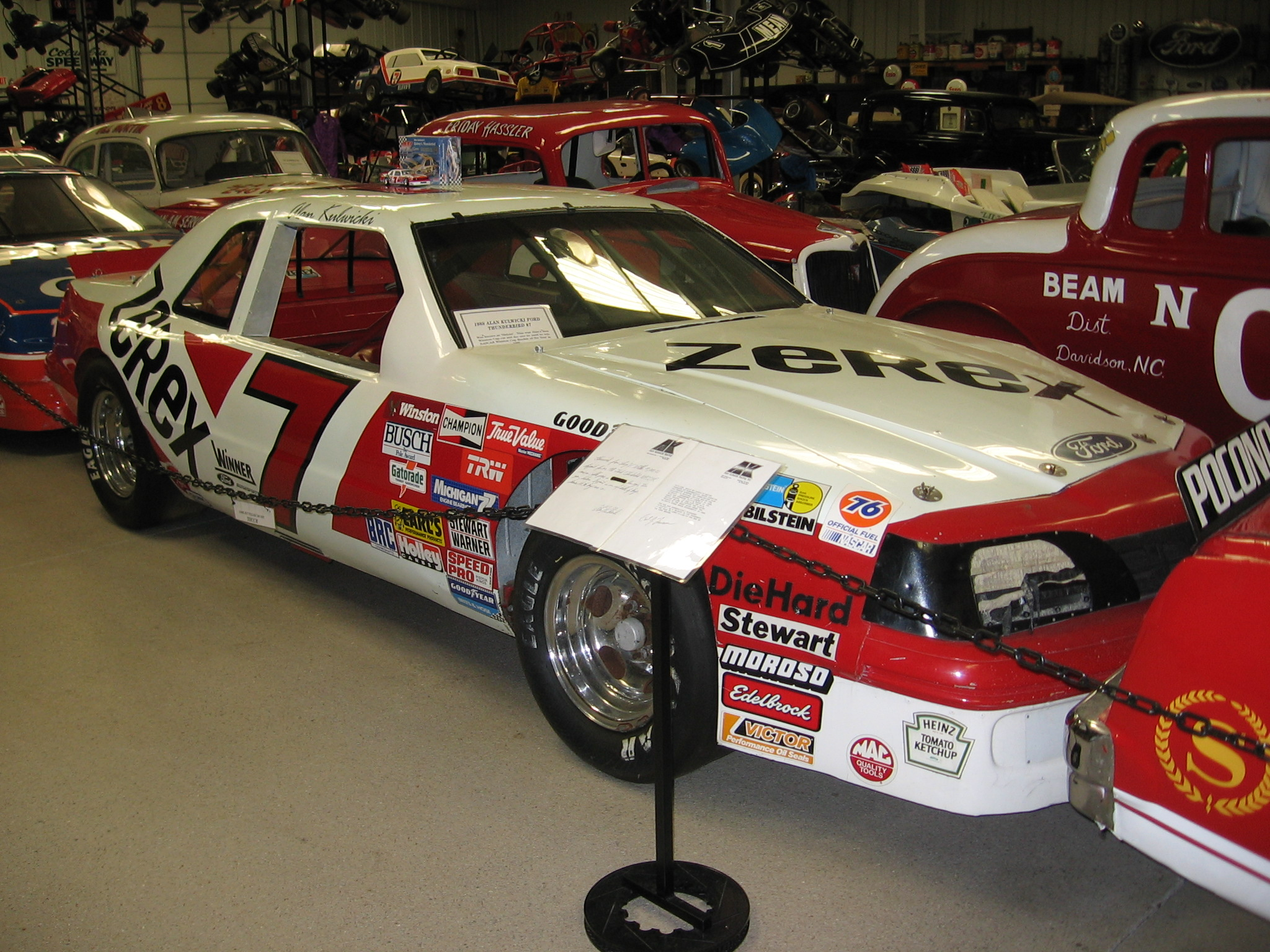
Kulwicki's 1988 car, which he used for his Polish victory lap

In 1988, Kulwicki hired Paul Andrews as his crew chief after Andrews was recommended by Rusty Wallace at the 1987 NASCAR Awards banquet. That year, Kulwicki won his first NASCAR Winston Cup race in the season's second-to-last race at Phoenix International Raceway after race leader Ricky Rudd's car had motor problems late in the race. Kulwicki led 41 laps and won by 18.5 seconds. After the race finished, he turned his car around and made, what he called, a "Polish victory lap" by driving the opposite way (clockwise) on the track, with the driver's side of the car facing the fans. "This gave me the opportunity to wave to the crowd from the driver's side", Kulwicki explained. Andrews recalled, "He had wanted to do something special and something different for his first win and only his first."

It's been a long road and it's taken a lot of hard work to get here, but this has made it all worthwhile. When you work for something so hard for so long, you wonder if it's going to be worth all of the anticipation. Believe me, it certainly was. And what do you think of my Polish victory lap? There will never be another first win and you know, everybody sprays champagne or stands up on the car. I wanted to do something different for the fans.

— Kulwicki victory lane quote in Grand National Scene magazine

He finished the 1988 season with four pole positions in 29 events, nine top 10 finishes including two second-place finishes, twelve DNFs, and an average finish of 19.2. Kulwicki finished fourteenth in the Winston Cup points standings for the season.

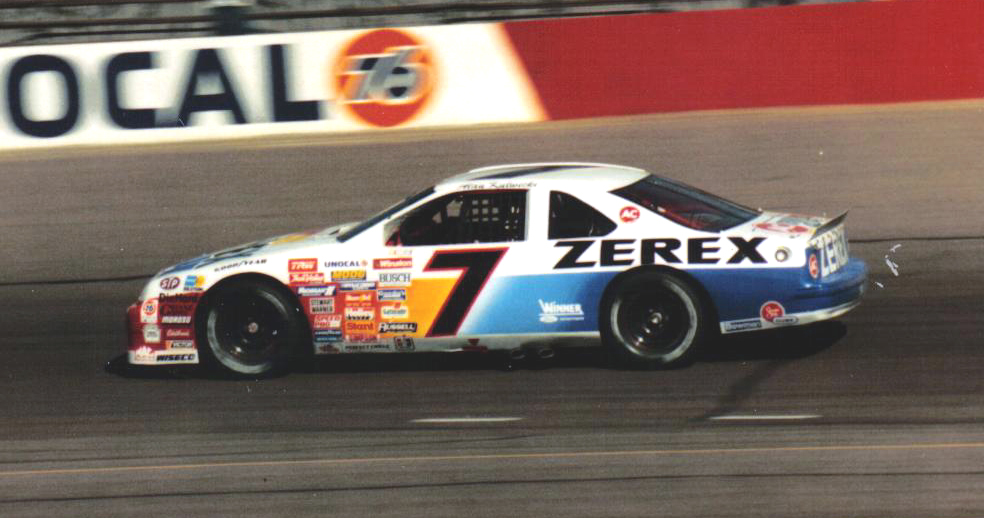
1989 car at Phoenix

Kulwicki started his own engine-building program for the 1989 season. He had four second place finishes that season and held the points lead after the fifth race of the season. The team dropped from fourth to fifteenth in points by suffering nine engine failures during a sixteen-race stretch in the middle of the season. In 29 races, he had six pole positions, nine top-ten finishes, and finished fourteenth in season points. The team had a new workshop built during the season.

=== 1990–1991 ===
Junior Johnson, owner of one of the top NASCAR teams, approached Kulwicki at the beginning of the 1990 season to try to get him to replace Terry Labonte in the No. 11 Budweiser Ford. Kulwicki declined, stating that he was more interested in running his own team. He won his second Cup race at Rockingham on October 21, 1990, and finished eighth in points that year, his first finish in the top-ten points in a season. In 29 races, he had thirteen top-ten finishes and one pole position.

After the 1990 season, Kulwicki lost his primary sponsor after Ashland, Inc., the makers of Zerex, chose instead to use its Valvoline motor oil brand to replace Folgers Coffee and sponsor Mark Martin at Roush Racing. Kulwicki had begun negotiations with Kraft General Foods, who was looking for a new team to sponsor after its deal with Bahari Racing expired after the 1990 season, and was set to sign to carry Maxwell House Coffee on the No. 7. Johnson, who had signed Geoff Bodine to drive the No. 11 when Kulwicki rejected his offer in 1990, tried again and came back with a $1 million offer for Kulwicki to take the wheel of his second car, which he had not run since 1986. After Kulwicki again declined, Johnson went to Kraft himself and convinced them to sign to sponsor his car instead, which he would hire Sterling Marlin to drive.

At the opening race of the season, the 1991 Daytona 500, five cars raced with paint schemes representing different branches of the United States military to show support for the American forces involved in the Gulf War in what was the first ever instance of special liveries being used in NASCAR; Kulwicki was one of the five drivers, striking an agreement with the Army to sponsor his car for the race. He went on to finish in eighth place, climbing from 27th. The agreement with the Army was only for Daytona, leaving Kulwicki to run a plain white car for the foreseeable future; while his results in the next two races were solid, with a fifth at Richmond and a seventeenth at Rockingham, Kulwicki was now running the entire operation out of pocket. He would need to secure some sort of backing or risk running out of funds to continue. As the Winston Cup Series rolled into Atlanta for the Motorcraft Quality Parts 500, the break Kulwicki needed presented itself.

One of forty-seven drivers to attempt to qualify, Kulwicki qualified on the pole position. Among the seven cars that did not qualify for the race was the No. 82 Ford driven by Mark Stahl, another owner-driver. As it so happened, he was sponsored by the restaurant chain Hooters, which was based in Atlanta and also sponsored one of the track's Cup Series races. Since both sides had needs to be fulfilled, with Hooters wanting their brand on a car in race held at its home track and Kulwicki seeking funding to keep his operation alive, they both agreed to terms for the Hooters sponsorship to be carried on the #7. The principals agreed to at least a one-race deal, which became a much longer-term deal when Kulwicki recorded an eighth-place finish in the race.

Later in the season, Kulwicki won the Bristol night race for his third career win. In addition to the win, Kulwicki finished the season with eleven top-ten finishes, four poles, and a thirteenth-place points finish.

=== 1992: Championship season ===
Kulwicki started out the year by having to take one of two provisional starting positions at the Daytona 500; he ended up finishing fourth. He passed Dale Jarrett with 27 laps left at the Food City 500 race on April 5 at Bristol to take a narrow victory. It was his fourth Winston Cup victory. After that race, he never left the top five in season points. Andrews attributed Kulwicki's consistently strong finishes to the steady performance of newly adopted radial tires throughout their lifespan. He said, "It was hard to control them, and the driver's ability to work with that car during practice in order to get the car set up meant so much more than it ever did." Kulwicki's second victory in the season was at the first race at Pocono, which was the first time he had won on a superspeedway. Discounted as a contender for the season championship during the year, Kulwicki was expected to fade from contention as Bill Elliott and Davey Allison, both of whom had won more races than Kulwicki and who had traded the points lead between them, were both having strong seasons and looked to be the favorites for the Winston Cup. He did not, however, and remained in the top-five in the series standings.

He qualified on the pole position for the Peak AntiFreeze 500 race on September 20 at Dover, but crashed early in the race and finished 34th. At the conclusion of the race, Kulwicki trailed points leader Elliott by 278 points and second place Allison by 124. He seemed to resign himself to another season without a championship, saying to reporters, "This probably finishes us off in the championship deal."

However, Kulwicki was able to benefit from bad fortune that would befall Elliott in the weeks ahead. The next week at Martinsville, Elliott fell out of the race with a blown engine while Kulwicki finished fifth. Kulwicki followed that up with a twelfth-place run at North Wilkesboro, a second place at Charlotte, and another twelfth-place finish at Rockingham. While Elliott managed a fourth place finish at Rockingham, he ran twenty-sixth at North Wilkesboro with handling problems and thirtieth at Charlotte after his car's sway bar broke. Allison too had not run well over the same four races; brake failure late in the race at Martinsville left him sixteenth, ill-handling cars relegated him to eleventh and nineteenth at North Wilkesboro and Charlotte, and he could only manage tenth place at Rockingham. This left Kulwicki just seventy points behind Elliott and a mere 15 points behind Allison with two races left.

Then, at Phoenix, Kulwicki ran fourth while Elliott suffered overheating problems and a cracked cylinder head. He once again finished outside of the top-thirty. Allison won the race, retaking the points lead, but Kulwicki's performance left him within striking distance of the points lead. When the points standings were tabulated after the race, Kulwicki had surpassed Elliott in the standings and stood thirty points behind Allison.

"Underbird" lettering on the car's front bumper

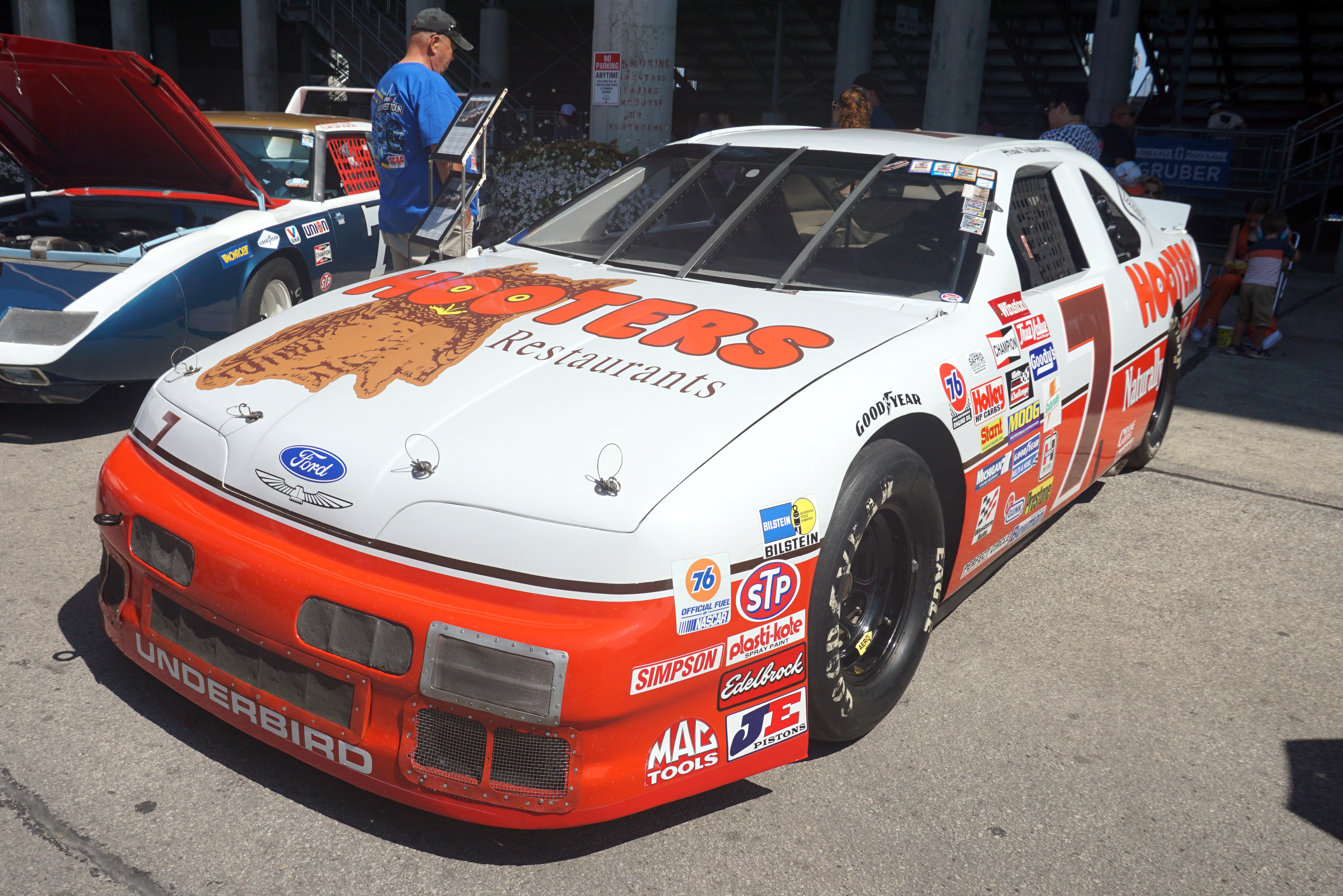
The "Underbird" at the Milwaukee Mile in 2023

Thus, the stage was set for the final race of the season, the Hooters 500 at Atlanta. Before the race, Kulwicki received approval from NASCAR and Ford to change the "Thunderbird" lettering on his bumper for the race to "underbird" because he felt like the underdog in the contention for the championship.

Kulwicki qualified for the race in fourteenth position, three spots behind Elliott and three spots ahead of Allison. Allison simply needed to finish fifth or better to clinch the Cup, regardless of what his cohorts did. Atlanta, however, was not one of his better tracks, as he had a string of inconsistent finishes there. He had, however, finished fourth in the spring race won by Elliott. Kulwicki needed to outpace both Elliott and Allison and put as much distance as he could between the two drivers because he not only had to make up the thirty points on points leader Allison, but also needed to put distance between himself and Elliott, who trailed him by only ten points.

Kulwicki narrowly avoided an incident on the second lap of the race as front row starters Rick Mast and Brett Bodine spun out. However, trouble would eventually find him on the first round of pit stops. As Kulwicki was getting ready to leave his pit box after service, he shifted into first gear and his car stalled. He got a push start from his crew and upshifted into fourth gear, which enabled him to refire the car and head back out. Andrews later said, "We had to leave pit road in fourth gear, because we had broken metal parts in there, and only by leaving it in fourth are you not going to move metal around as much. We could only hope that the loose piece of metal didn't get in there and break the gears in half. We had three or four pit stops after it broke. I held my breath all day long." While Kulwicki had no choice but to keep his car in top gear, which caused his pit stop times to be much slower than usual, he was one of the faster drivers on track that day and he quickly gained positions once back up to speed. He eventually caught up to Elliott, who was also running well, and the two began jockeying back and forth for positions; eventually, Kulwicki found his way to the front of the field and held onto the lead despite the best efforts of the #11 team. Then, on lap 255, Kulwicki got a break he desperately needed. Allison was running in sixth place at the time, and since he had led a lap during the course of the event was still leading the championship. As he was coming off of turn four, Ernie Irvan spun out in front of the field on the frontstretch. Irvan, who had been running three laps down at the time, came down in front of Allison, who was unable to avoid him and the two made contact and crashed into the inside wall near the start/finish line. Allison's car was badly damaged in the incident, and although the damage would be able to be repaired in the garage his chances of winning the Winston Cup were over.

Under the ensuing caution, Kulwicki and Andrews went to work on discussing strategy for the remainder of the race. With Allison now out of the championship picture, maximizing track position and points became Kulwicki's focus. He and Elliott had each gained five bonus points for leading a lap, and five additional bonus points were available for the driver who led the most laps during the race. However, despite the possibility for more caution periods, Kulwicki would have to pit at some point to get enough fuel in the car to make it to the advertised distance. Therefore, Kulwicki and Andrews decided to stay out as long as they could and lead as many laps as possible. Once the race resumed, Kulwicki was able to maintain his lead on Elliott despite the best efforts of the latter.

On lap 310, after leading 101 consecutive laps and 103 overall, Kulwicki came down pit road for a fuel-only stop. Since the team did not need a full twenty-two gallon load of fuel to make it to the end and they needed to save as much time as they could, Andrews made the determination to put approximately half a can of gasoline into Kulwicki's tank; this could be done in a little over three seconds and with only two crew members. Fuel man Tony Gibson and catch can man Peter Jellen waited as Kulwicki pulled in. There was a problem with the fuel relay, however, and Gibson was not certain of the amount of gasoline that made it into the tank. Kulwicki came back onto the track in third place, behind front runner Elliott and second place Terry Labonte. He had not fully secured the five bonus points for leading the most laps, since Elliott had an opportunity to tie Kulwicki's total. In that case, both drivers would receive the points. Elliott also had to come down to top off his fuel tank.

But as he had done with the adjustment following the broken gearbox and the accident that took Allison out of the race, Kulwicki once again caught a break that affected his chances in a significant way. Tim Brewer, Elliott's crew chief, had lost track of Labonte, as had the ESPN television broadcast. Brewer called Elliott in on lap 314, unaware that Labonte was still on the race track. Labonte was able to pass Elliott while he pitted, then pitted himself one lap later. Elliott reassumed the point with twelve laps remaining, which when added to the ninety he had already led would only add up to 102; this resulted in Kulwicki clinching the additional bonus, which he was notified about several laps later.

However, Andrews also made Kulwicki aware of the fuel relay issue on the pit stop earlier and that he still needed to save fuel. Although he was far enough ahead of third place Geoff Bodine and fourth place Jimmy Spencer that neither could catch him as the race was running, running out of fuel here presented the possibility that Kulwicki could be passed by both drivers before the race finished; if this happened, he and Elliott would tie in the standings and the championship would go to the #11 based on Elliott having more wins. Elliott did manage to take the checkered flag, but Kulwicki held onto second place and was the series champion. He celebrated the championship with his second Polish victory lap. Always conscious of his appearance for potential sponsors, Kulwicki combed his hair, making a national television audience wait for him to emerge from his car.

Kulwicki had overcome the 278-point deficit in the final six races of the season by ending with a fifth, a fourth, and two second-place finishes. Kulwicki won the championship because of his consistent high finishes. It was the closest title win in NASCAR Cup Series history until the implementation of the Chase for the Cup format in 2004. Kulwicki was the last owner-driver to win the title for nearly two decades, the first Cup champion with a college degree, and the first Cup champion born in a northern state. He started from the pole position six times during the season, which was the most for any driver. The song that played during a short salute to Kulwicki at the year-end awards banquet was Frank Sinatra's "My Way".

==== Championship honors ====
Kulwicki returned to his hometown, Greenfield, for Alan Kulwicki Day in January 1993. The gymnasium at Greenfield High School was filled and surrounded by four to five thousand people. Local television crews filmed the event. Kulwicki signed autographs for six hours.

In celebration of his championship, sponsor Hooters made a special "Alan Tribute Card" that was used at all of the autograph sessions during the 1993 season.

=== 1993 ===
Kulwicki did not significantly change his spending habits after winning the 1992 championship. "The only thing I really wanted to buy was a plane", he said, "but it turns out Hooters has a couple I can use." Kulwicki negotiated a lease agreement with Hooters Chairman Robert Brooks for the use of one of his aircraft. The Swearingen Merlin III twin turboprop Kulwicki leased was painted with Hooters livery, and its FAA registry changed from N300EF (for Eastern Foods, another of Brooks's companies) to N300AK.

After the first five races of the 1993 NASCAR Winston Cup Series had been completed, Kulwicki was ninth in overall points. Kulwicki had concerns about how often he was being allowed to use the airplane he had leased, and other financial concerns he wanted to bring up with his sponsor, Hooters. The PR representative for both Hooters and Kulwicki, Tom Roberts, suggested that Kulwicki bring up his concerns to Hooters leadership while in flight from Knoxville to Bristol on the evening of April 1, 1993, en route to the 1993 Food City 500. Roberts himself, in an attempt to avoid a conflict of interest between the two sides, did not board the chartered flight, and took a commercial flight to Bristol instead.

== Death ==
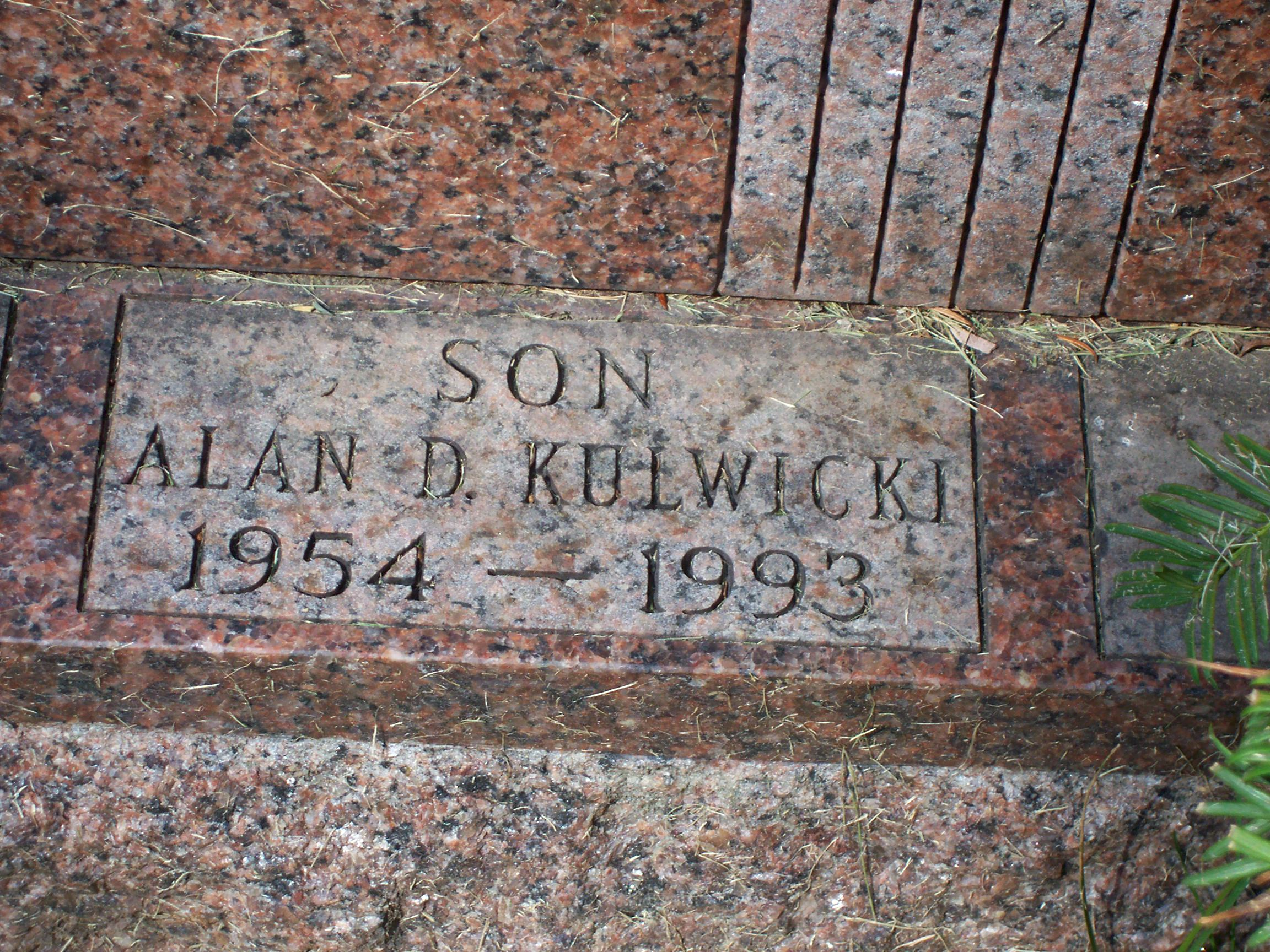
Grave marker at St. Adalbert cemetery

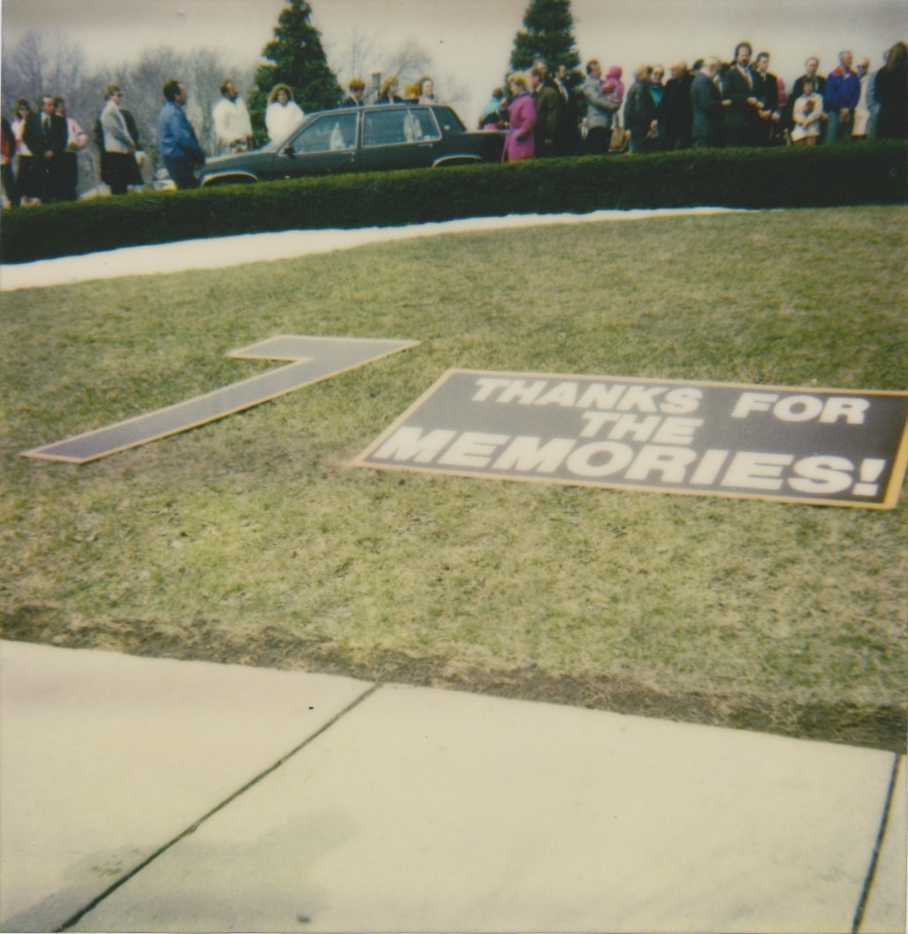
Funeral service

Kulwicki died in an airplane crash on Thursday April 1, 1993. He was returning from an appearance at the Knoxville Hooters on the Kingston Pike, in a Hooters corporate plane on a short flight across Tennessee before the Sunday spring race at Bristol. The plane slowed and crashed just before final approach at Tri-Cities Regional Airport in a field off of Interstate 81 near Blountville. The National Transportation Safety Board attributed the crash to the pilot's failure to use the airplane's anti-ice system to clear ice from the engine inlet system.

Kulwicki was buried at St. Adalbert's Cemetery in Milwaukee; the funeral was attended by NASCAR President Bill France Jr. and numerous drivers. Kulwicki's racecar transporter was driven from the rainy track later that Friday morning while other teams and the media watched it travel slowly around the track with a black wreath on its grille. As the transporter passed the start / finish line, the flagman waved a checkered flag. In 2008, Kyle Petty described the slow laps as "the saddest thing I've ever seen at a racetrack... We just sat and cried." Kulwicki had competed in five NASCAR races that season with two Top 5 finishes, and was ranked ninth in points at his death. In his career, he had won five NASCAR Winston Cup races, 24 pole positions, 75 Top 10 finishes, and one championship in 207 races.

His car was driven by road course specialist Tommy Kendall on road courses and by Jimmy Hensley at the other tracks. It was raced for most of the 1993 season until the team was sold to Geoff Bodine, who operated it as Geoff Bodine Racing.

Kulwicki had been selected to compete in the 1993 International Race of Champions (IROC) series as the reigning Winston Cup champion. He competed in two IROC races before his death, finishing ninth at Daytona and eleventh at Darlington. Dale Earnhardt raced for Kulwicki in the final two IROC races, and the prize money for those races and their fifth place combined points finish was given to the Winston Cup Racing Wives Auxiliary, Brenner Children's Hospital and St. Thomas Aquinas Church charities.

== Legacy ==
Three days after Kulwicki's death, Bristol race winner Rusty Wallace honored his former short track rival by performing Kulwicki's trademark Polish victory lap. Davey Allison died on July 13, 1993; competitors who had been carrying a No. 7 sticker in memory of Kulwicki added a No. 28 sticker for Allison. After the final race of the season, series champion Dale Earnhardt and race winner Wallace drove a side-by-side Polish victory lap carrying flags for Kulwicki and Allison. Kulwicki finished 41st in the final points standings despite competing in only five races. Racing Champions issued a die-cast version of Alan Kulwicki's No. 7 car that was a tribute to Kulwicki's 1992 title.

The USAR Hooters Pro Cup championship (now CARS Tour) held the "Four Champions Challenge" in memory of the four victims of the plane crash. Established in 1997, the challenge was a four-race series, with each race named after one of the four who died in the crash: Kulwicki, Mark Brooks (son of Hooters owner Bob Brooks), Dan Duncan, and pilot Charles Campbell.

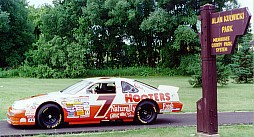
Kulwicki's "underbird" car on display at Alan Kulwicki Memorial Park

Milwaukee County honored Kulwicki in 1996 by creating Alan Kulwicki Memorial Park, located near the corner of Highway 100 and Cold Spring Road in Greenfield (Area Map). Hooters chairman Robert Brooks donated $250,000 to build the 28-acre (0.11 km^{2}) park, which features a Kulwicki museum inside the Brooks Pavilion.

Kulwicki appeared as an unlockable legend in the videogames NASCAR '99, NASCAR 2000, NASCAR Rumble, NASCAR Thunder 2003, and NASCAR Thunder 2004.

Since 1994, the University of North Carolina at Charlotte has awarded the Alan Kulwicki Memorial Scholarship to one incoming student each year. Scholarship winners are outstanding high school seniors who plan to major in mechanical engineering. By 1998, UNC Charlotte created an automotive and motorsports engineering program.

In October 2009, the Kulwicki family donated nearly $1.9 million to benefit motorsports engineering education at UNC Charlotte. In honor of the gift, the university's board of trustees renamed the existing motorsports research facility the Alan D. Kulwicki Motorsports Laboratory. The donation funded the construction of a second motorsports engineering building, which opened in January 2012.

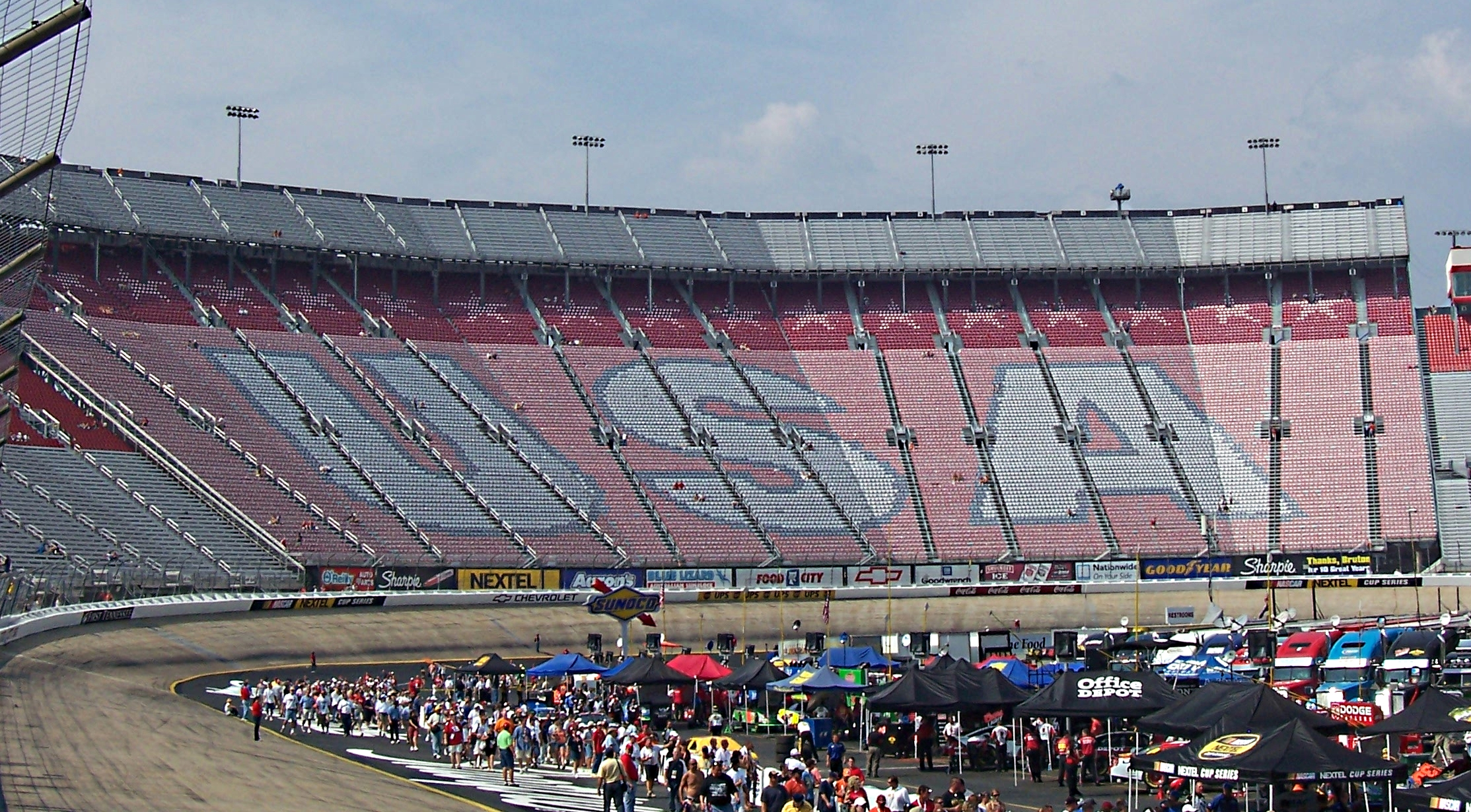
Kulwicki Grandstand at Bristol Motor Speedway in 2006

Bristol Motor Speedway named its grandstand in turns one and two in honor of Kulwicki, as well as a terrace above the grandstand. The 2004 Busch Series race at the Milwaukee Mile was named the "Alan Kulwicki 250" in honor of Kulwicki. Wisconsinite Paul Menard turned his car around after winning the 2006 Busch Series event and performed a Polish victory lap to honor Kulwicki. Slinger Super Speedway has held an annual Alan Kulwicki Memorial race since 1994.

Kulwicki was posthumously inducted into the International Motorsports Hall of Fame in 2002. He was inducted in the Lowe's Motor Speedway Court of Legends in 1993, the Wisconsin Athletic Hall of Fame in 1993, Talladega-Texaco Hall of Fame in 1996, Bristol Motor Speedway Heroes of Bristol Hall of Fame in 1997, the National Polish-American Sports Hall of Fame in 2001, and the Motorsports Hall of Fame of America in 2010. Kulwicki was inducted into the NASCAR Hall of Fame in 2019.

Kulwicki's success as an owner-driver sparked a small trend among NASCAR veterans. Geoff Bodine, his younger brother Brett, Ricky Rudd, Bill Elliott, and Joe Nemechek all began racing teams shortly after Kulwicki's death. However, none were as successful as Kulwicki's. Robby Gordon frequently mentions Alan as an inspiration for him as an owner-driver, and selected car No. 7 as a tribute to Kulwicki.

Slinger Super Speedway began an Alan Kulwicki Memorial night in 1993; it has continued the annual memorial as of 2016. In 2010, the University of Wisconsin–Milwaukee created the Alan Kulwicki Memorial Student Center in their Engineering and Mathematical Sciences Building. The center, along with a scholarship for engineering students, was made possible in part by a donation from Thelma H. Kulwicki, the late racer's stepmother, who also donated numerous items of memorabilia located in the center.

In May 2012, the Milwaukee County Historical Society announced plans for a special exhibit celebrating the life and career of Kulwicki to open in early 2013. The exhibit is called "Alan Kulwicki: A Champion's Story".

=== Kulwicki Driver Development Program ===
Official logo of the Kulwicki Driver Development Program

In 2015, Kulwicki's friends began the Kulwicki Driver Development program to "help worthy drivers along the way in reaching their dream...while at the same time keep Alan Kulwicki's memory and legacy alive." The field is narrowed to 15 applicants and the program gives $7777 to support seven drivers' career advancement. Drivers are judged based on their on-track performance as well as off-track activities, social media presence, and community involvement. The winner receives seven times $7777 ($54,439) and a trophy. It was cancelled for the 2020 season because of COVID-19 concerns, and resumed in 2021. The program winners as of 2025 are:

Year	Winner	Other participants
2015	Ty Majeski	Steve Apel, Justin Crider, Dave Farrington Jr., Reagan May, Bryce Napier, Cole Williams
2016	Alex Prunty	Jeremy Doss, Dave Farrington Jr., Cody Haskins, Quin Houff, Michael Ostdiek, Brandon Setzer
2017	Cody Haskins	Braison Bennett, Cole Butcher, Justin Mondeik, Michael Ostdiek, John Peters, Brett Yackey
2018	Brett Yackey	Cole Butcher, Justin Carroll, Derek Griffith, Molly Helmuth, Justin Mondeik, Brittney Zamora
2019	Jeremy Doss	Danny Benedict, Justin Carroll, Luke Fenhaus, Derek Griffith, Carson Kvapil, Paul Shafer Jr.
2020	Canceled due to COVID-19	
2021	Luke Fenhaus	Wyatt Alexander, Luke Fenhaus, Max Kahler, Ryan Kuhn, Kole Raz, Brooke Storer, Dylan Zampa
2022	Dylan Zampa	Dylan Zampa, Jackson Boone, Evan Shotko, Jacob Nottestad, Haeden Plybon, Riley Stenjem, Kate Re
2023	Max Cookson	Haedon Plybon, Jackson Boone, Riley Stenjem, Evan Shotko, Jacob Borst, Levon Van Der Geest
2024	Ty Fredrickson	Derek Gluchacki, Levon Van Der Geest, Evan Goetz, Max Kahler, Chase Burda, Brandon Varney
2025	Derek Gluchacki	Bryce Miller, Seth Christensen, Noah Eisenhower, Taylor Hoar
2026	—*	—*

== Media ==
Father Dale Grubba, the priest who had presided over Kulwicki's funeral, released a biography of his friend entitled Alan Kulwicki: NASCAR champion Against All Odds in 2009. The book was the basis for a low-budget feature film, Dare to Dream: The Alan Kulwicki Story, released on April 1, 2005. The film chronicles Kulwicki's life from racing late models at Slinger Super Speedway, through his rise to NASCAR champion, and ends with his death. The movie was created by Kulwicki's Wisconsin fans for less than $100,000. The star of the film, Brad Weber, was a Kulwicki fan and credits the late driver with being his inspiration to become an actor.

== Motorsports career results ==
=== NASCAR ===
(key) (Bold – Pole position awarded by qualifying time. Italics – Pole position earned by points standings or practice time. * – Most laps led.)

==== Winston Cup Series ====
NASCAR Winston Cup Series results
Year	Team	No.	Make	1	2	3	4	5	6	7	8	9	10	11	12	13	14	15	16	17	18	19	20	21	22	23	24	25	26	27	28	29	30	NWCC	Pts	Ref
1985	Terry Motorsports	32	Ford	DAY	RCH	CAR	ATL	BRI	DAR	NWS	MAR	TAL	DOV	CLT	RSD	POC	MCH	DAY	POC	TAL	MCH	BRI	DAR	RCH; 19	DOV; 21	MAR	NWS							40th	509	
1985	Terry Motorsports	38	Ford																									CLT; 13	CAR; 27	ATL; 22	RSD			40th	509	
1986	Terry Motorsports	32	Ford	DAY; DNQ	RCH; DNQ	CAR; 15																												21st	2705	
1986	Terry Motorsports	35	Ford				ATL; 14	BRI; 15	DAR; 11	NWS; 18	MAR; 4	TAL; DNQ	DOV; 23	CLT; 27	RSD	POC	MCH; 16	DAY; 10	POC; 22	TAL; 32	GLN	MCH; 14	BRI; 10											21st	2705	
1986	AK Racing	35	Ford																					DAR; 12	RCH; 15	DOV; 7	MAR; 13	NWS; 17	CLT; 14	CAR; 12	ATL; 18	RSD; 24		21st	2705	
1987	AK Racing	7	Ford	DAY; 15	CAR; 25	**RCH**; 6	ATL; 33	DAR; 14	NWS; 4	BRI; 5	MAR; 28	TAL; 34	CLT; 27	DOV; 15	POC; 30	RSD; 28	MCH; 31	DAY; 32	POC; 2	TAL; 23	GLN; 6	MCH; 6	BRI; 11	DAR; 40	**RCH**; 23	**DOV**; 14	MAR; 6	NWS; 7	CLT; 29	CAR; 18	RSD; 11	ATL; 6		15th	3238	
1988	AK Racing	7	Ford	DAY; 32	RCH; 21	CAR; 4	ATL; 39	DAR; 2	BRI; 19	NWS; 15	MAR; 20	TAL; 22	CLT; 3	DOV; 6	RSD; 38	**POC**; 27	MCH; 21	DAY; 40	POC; 8	TAL; 19	GLN; 19	MCH; 36	**BRI**; 5	DAR; 15	RCH; 5	DOV; 31	MAR; 2	**CLT**; 25	NWS; 29	CAR; 26	PHO; 1	ATL; 25		14th	3176	
1989	AK Racing	7	Ford	DAY; 7	CAR; 2	**ATL**; 16	RCH; 2	DAR; 7	BRI; 20	NWS; 2	MAR; 22	TAL; 13	**CLT**; 23*	DOV; 25	SON; 36	POC; 34	MCH; 36	DAY; 5	POC; 39	TAL; 30	GLN; 39	MCH; 10	**BRI**; 2	**DAR**; 32	RCH; 15	DOV; 32	MAR; 26	CLT; 28	NWS; 11	**CAR**; 9	PHO; 11*	**ATL**; 13		14th	3236	
1990	AK Racing	7	Ford	DAY; 35	RCH; 24	CAR; 27	ATL; 8	DAR; 23	BRI; 31	NWS; 11	MAR; 25	TAL; 13	CLT; 6	DOV; 24	SON; 11	POC; 34	MCH; 6	DAY; 2	POC; 17	TAL; 4	GLN; 11	**MCH**; 11	BRI; 6	DAR; 3	RCH; 26	DOV; 29	MAR; 6	NWS; 9	CLT; 5	CAR; 1	PHO; 6	ATL; 8		8th	3599	
1991	AK Racing	7	Ford	DAY; 8	RCH; 5	CAR; 17	**ATL**; 8	DAR; 34	BRI; 26	NWS; 29	MAR; 9	TAL; 27	CLT; 35	DOV; 14	SON; 17	POC; 16	MCH; 24	DAY; 14	**POC**; 16	TAL; 16	GLN; 23	**MCH**; 8	BRI; 1	DAR; 35	RCH; 6	**DOV**; 24	MAR; 22	NWS; 10	CLT; 3	CAR; 33	PHO; 4	ATL; 9		13th	3354	
1992	AK Racing	7	Ford	DAY; 4	CAR; 31	RCH; 2	ATL; 7	DAR; 18	**BRI**; 1*	**NWS**; 7*	MAR; 16*	TAL; 6	CLT; 7	DOV; 12	SON; 14	POC; 1*	MCH; 3	DAY; 30	POC; 3	TAL; 25	GLN; 7	**MCH**; 14	BRI; 8	DAR; 8	RCH; 15	**DOV**; 34	MAR; 5	**NWS**; 12	**CLT**; 2	CAR; 12	PHO; 4	ATL; 2*		1st	4078	
1993	AK Racing	7	Ford	DAY; 26	CAR; 4	RCH; 3	ATL; 36	DAR; 6	BRI	NWS	MAR	TAL	SON	CLT	DOV	POC	MCH	DAY	NHA	POC	TAL	GLN	MCH	BRI	DAR	RCH	DOV	MAR	NWS	CLT	CAR	PHO	ATL	41st	625	

===== Daytona 500 =====
Year	Team	Manufacturer	Start	Finish
1986	Terry Motorsports	Ford	DNQ	
1987	AK Racing	Ford	37	15
1988	AK Racing	Ford	16	32
1989	AK Racing	Ford	9	7
1990	AK Racing	Ford	25	35
1991	AK Racing	Ford	27	8
1992	AK Racing	Ford	41	4
1993	AK Racing	Ford	10	26

==== Busch Series ====
NASCAR Busch Series results
Year	Team	No.	Make	1	2	3	4	5	6	7	8	9	10	11	12	13	14	15	16	17	18	19	20	21	22	23	24	25	26	27	28	29	NBSC	Pts	Ref
1984	Whitaker Racing	7	Olds	DAY	RCH	CAR	HCY	MAR	DAR	ROU	NSV	LGY	MLW; 2	DOV	CLT; 7	SBO	HCY	ROU	SBO	ROU	HCY	IRP	LGY	SBO	BRI; 5	DAR	RCH	NWS	CLT; 34	HCY	CAR	MAR	50th	377	
1985	Whitaker Racing	07	Olds	DAY; 16	CAR	HCY	BRI	MAR	DAR	SBO	LGY	DOV	CLT	SBO	HCY	ROU	IRP	SBO	LGY	HCY													52nd	236	
1985	Whitaker Racing	7	Pontiac																		**MLW**; 14	BRI	DAR	RCH	NWS	ROU	CLT	HCY	CAR	MAR			52nd	236	

=== International Race of Champions ===
(key) (Bold – Pole position. * – Most laps led.)

International Race of Champions results
Year	Make	1	2	3	4	Pos.	Points	Ref
1993	Dodge	DAY; 9	DAR; 11	TAL	MCH	5th	47	

Achievements
Preceded by Dale Earnhardt	NASCAR Winston Cup Champion; 1992	Succeeded by Dale Earnhardt
Preceded by Ken Schrader	NASCAR Rookie of the Year; 1986	Succeeded by Davey Allison
