= Tri-Cities Regional Airport =

Tri-Cities Airport Tri-Cities Airport, TN/VA
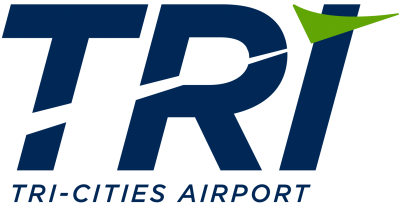

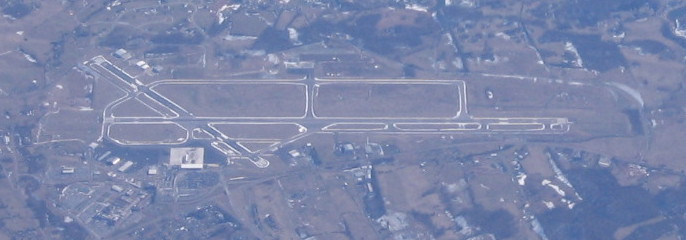
- IATA: TRI; ICAO: KTRI; FAA LID: TRI

Summary
- Airport type: Public
- Owner: Tri-Cities Airport Authority
- Serves: Tri-Cities, Tennessee-Virginia (Johnson City, Tennessee; Kingsport, Tennessee; Bristol, Tennessee-Virginia)
- Location: Blountville, Tennessee, U.S.
- Opened: November 5, 1937
- Elevation AMSL: 1,519 ft (463 m)
- Coordinates: 36°28′31″N 082°24′27″W
- Website: www.flytri.com

Map
- Location TRI (the United States)

Runways
| Direction | Length | | Surface |
| Direction | ft | m | Surface |
|---|---|---|---|
| 5/23 | 8,000 | 2,438 | Asphalt |
| 9/27 | 4,443 | 1,354 | Asphalt |

Statistics (2024)
- Aircraft operations: 44,492
- Total passengers: 454,000
- Based aircraft (2023): 53
- Source: Federal Aviation Administration

Tri-Cities Airport (IATA: TRI, ICAO: KTRI, FAA LID: TRI) (also known as Tri-Cities Airport, TN/VA), serves the Tri-Cities area (Johnson City, Tennessee; Kingsport, Tennessee; Bristol, Tennessee-Virginia) of Northeast Tennessee and Southwest Virginia. It has a street address in the census-designated place of Blountville, Tennessee, but is adjacent to the city limits of Kingsport. The airport is governed by the Tri-Cities Airport Authority (TCAA) whose members are appointed by the cities of Johnson City, Kingsport, Bristol (TN), Bristol (VA) and both Washington and Sullivan counties in Tennessee.

Federal Aviation Administration records say the airport had 202,730 passenger boardings (enplanements) in calendar year 2008, 217,783 in 2009 and 202,114 in 2010. The National Plan of Integrated Airport Systems for 2017–2021 categorized it as a primary commercial service airport (more than 10,000 enplanements per year).

== History ==
In the mid-1930s Johnson City's airfield and Kingsport's airstrip were deemed impractical for expansion. Bristol, Johnson City, and Kingsport cooperated with Sullivan County to build an airport on 323 acres in Sullivan County, between the three cities. In September 1937, two small runways, a terminal building, and aircraft hangar had been built and the airport saw its first airliner, an American Airlines DC-2. On November 5, 1937, McKellar Field, now known as Tri-Cities Airport TN/VA, was dedicated by Senator Kenneth McKellar.

American Airlines pulled out in 1952. Piedmont Airlines flew to TRI from 1948 until it merged into USAir; Capital Airlines and successor United Airlines stopped at TRI from the 1940s until 1977 when Allegheny Airlines replaced them. Southern Airways appeared in 1960. The first jets were Piedmont Boeing 727-100s and Southern Douglas DC-9-10s in 1967; in 1977 a Piedmont Boeing 737-200 was flying nonstop to New York LaGuardia Airport.

In January 2008 a quick service restaurant, Tailwind Express, was added in the post-security area of the airport along with the Tailwind Restaurant and Lounge in the pre-security area. In April 2012 the airport broke ground on a $10 million project that would lengthen a taxiway and move a road farther away from the airport, opening 140 acres for future development.

== Facilities ==
Tri-Cities Airport covers 1,250 acres (506 ha) at an elevation of 1,519 feet (463 m). It has two asphalt runways: 5/23 is 8,000 by 150 feet (2,438 x 46 m) and 9/27 is 4,443 by 150 feet (1,354 x 46 m).

For the year ending March 31, 2023 the airport had 49,790 aircraft operations, an average of 136 per day: 72% general aviation, 13% air taxi, 9% airline and 5% military. In March 2023, there were 53 aircraft based at this airport: 31 single-engine, 8 multi-engine, 12 jet and 2 helicopter.

== Airlines and destinations ==
| Airlines | Destinations |
|---|---|
| Allegiant Air | Orlando/Sanford; Seasonal: St. Petersburg/Clearwater |
| American Eagle | Charlotte, Chicago–O'Hare, Dallas/Fort Worth |
| Breeze Airways | Orlando, Washington–Dulles (ends November 30, 2026) |
| Delta Connection | Atlanta |

Destinations map
All destinations from Tri-Cities Regional Airport
Red = Year-round destination
Green = Seasonal destination
blue = Future destination

== Statistics ==
Largest airlines at TRI (November 2024 – October 2025)
| Rank | Airline | Passengers | Share |
|---|---|---|---|
| 1 | Piedmont Airlines | 159,000 | 32.16% |
| 2 | Endeavor Air | 133,000 | 26.95% |
| 3 | Delta Air Lines | 65,210 | 13.18% |
| 4 | Envoy Air | 62,400 | 12.61% |
| 5 | Allegiant Air | 49,810 | 10.07% |
| | Other | 24,900 | 5.03% |

=== Top destinations ===
Busiest domestic routes from TRI (November 2024 – October 2025)
| Rank | Airport | Passengers | Airline |
|---|---|---|---|
| 1 | (Georgia (U.S. state)) Atlanta, Georgia | 108,820 | Delta |
| 2 | Charlotte, North Carolina | 80,030 | American |
| 3 | Dallas–Fort Worth, Texas | 35,750 | American |
| 4 | Orlando/Sanford, Florida | 18,010 | Allegiant |
| 5 | St. Petersburg/Clearwater, Florida | 6,920 | Allegiant |

== Accidents and incidents ==
- On April 1, 1993, NASCAR driver Alan Kulwicki and three others were killed when a Fairchild Merlin crashed on approach to the airport. The cause of the crash was pilot error in operating the aircraft's engine anti-ice system.

== See also ==
- List of airports in Tennessee
