= Robert H. Brooks =

American businessman

- Plaque of Hooters founder Robert H. Brooks at the Keiner Plaza Hooters in St. Louis, Missouri, in 2010.
- Born: Robert Howell Brooks; February 6, 1937; Loris, South Carolina, US
- Died: July 16, 2006 (aged 69); Myrtle Beach, South Carolina, US
- Education: Clemson University
- Occupations: Businessman, restaurateur, executive
- Known for: Founder of Naturally Fresh, Inc. Creator of Hooters of America

Robert Howell Brooks (February 6, 1937 – July 16, 2006) was founder of Naturally Fresh, Inc. in 1966 in Atlanta, Georgia. He helped create the Hooters of America, Inc. restaurant chain that would eventually drive that company's rapid expansion in the mid–late 1990s.

== Early life and career ==
Born in Loris, South Carolina (near the Myrtle Beach area), Brooks grew up on a tobacco farm. A 1960 dairy science graduate of Clemson University, Brooks spent time in the United States Army before founding Naturally Fresh Foods, a condiment and salad dressing manufacturer in the Atlanta area, in 1967.. He was raised as Methodist.

== Involvement with Hooters ==
In 1984, Hugh H Connerty Jr. bought the expansion and franchise rights for Hooters from Lynn D. Stewart and his five minority partners. Connerty founded Hooters America, Inc., along with a group of investors. Brooks bought out Connerty in 1991. He eventually got majority control and chairmanship of the entire organization. Under Brooks' leadership, Hooters expanded from half a dozen restaurants (in and around Clearwater, Florida) in the mid-1980s; to over 430 stores worldwide (including Taiwan, Venezuela, and Switzerland).

The company also included Hooters Air, an airline that ran from 2004 to 2006; the Hooters Pro Cup (auto racing); the Hooters Pro Tour (golf); the Hooters Casino Hotel in Las Vegas, Nevada, which opened in February 2006; and the Hooters MasterCard, which debuted in March 2006.

Brooks purchased the Hooters trademark from the company's founders in 2001. He turned over control of the company to his son, Coby, in 2003; and retired to Myrtle Beach, South Carolina. Brooks would still come up and visit the Atlanta headquarters on a weekly basis, though. Even after his retirement from Hooters, he was still affectionately known as the "World Wide Wing Commander" by company employees.

== Awards ==
Brooks was named Georgia Entrepreneur of the Year in 1996.

== Donations to South Carolina universities ==
Brooks was a major donor to universities in South Carolina. The Robert H. Brooks Performing Arts Center at Clemson, completed during the 1993-94 school year, was named in his honor following a large donation. He also donated $2 million to Coastal Carolina University (Conway, SC) in 2003 to create their first football stadium which the university named Brooks Stadium in his children's honor. He also created the Brooks Motorsports Institute (now Brooks Institute for Sports Science), the first of its kind in the US, at Clemson University about the study of the motorsports industry in the US.

== Death ==
Brooks died in Myrtle Beach, South Carolina, on July 16, 2006, of a cerebral aneurysm. His eldest son, Mark, from his first marriage predeceased him when he was killed on April 1, 1993 in a plane crash with 1992 NASCAR Winston Cup Series champion, Alan Kulwicki. Younger son Coby Brooks became President and CEO of Hooters, Inc. and Naturally Fresh, Inc., but left Hooters after the sale of the company in 2011.

== Tributes to Brooks ==
Following the announcement of Brooks' death on July 17, 2006, the main page of the Hooters website changed their sign to "Farewell World Wide Wing Commander" that ran from July 17, 2006, to September 10, 2006. A tribute was also done in the July 31, 2006, comic strip Prickly City.

The 2007 Hooters swimsuit calendar was also dedicated in his memory.
