= 1993 Tennessee Fairchild Merlin crash =

Aircraft accident

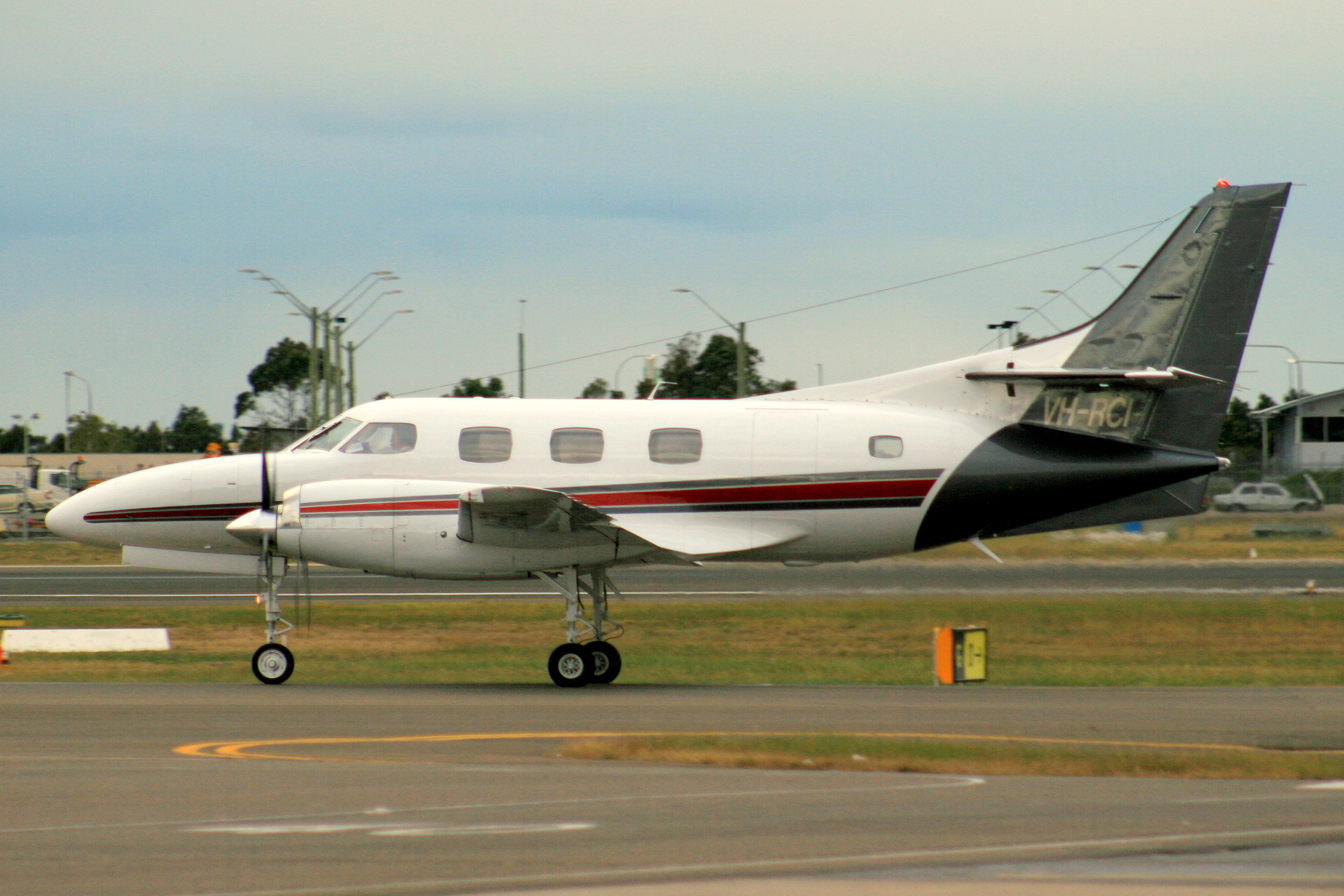
- A Fairchild SA227-TT Merlin, similar to the accident aircraft

Accident
- Date: April 1, 1993
- Summary: Crashed on approach in icing conditions
- Site: 5.5 miles (9 km) northeast of Tri-Cities Regional Airport; 36°33′54.5″N 82°18′48.7″W

Aircraft
- Aircraft type: Fairchild SA227-TT Merlin
- Operator: Eastern Foods Inc.
- Registration: N500AK
- Flight origin: McGhee Tyson Airport, Knoxville, Tennessee
- Destination: Tri-Cities Regional Airport, Blountville, Tennessee
- Occupants: 4
- Passengers: 3
- Crew: 1
- Fatalities: 4
- Survivors: 0

On the evening of April 1, 1993, a Swearingen Merlin III twin turboprop, carrying NASCAR champion Alan Kulwicki, crashed near Blountville, Tennessee, while on approach to the nearby Tri-Cities Regional Airport. All four people on board, including Alan Kulwicki, two executives of his corporate sponsor Hooters, and the pilot, were killed.

Kulwicki was being transported from a promotional appearance in Knoxville, Tennessee to the Bristol Motor Speedway for the running of the 1993 Food City 500 on April 4. An investigation determined that the probable cause of the accident was the pilot's failure to operate the engine inlet anti-ice system properly.

== Accident ==
At 14:21 local time the pilot filed a series of instrument flight plans with the Georgia Automated Flight Service Station at Macon, Georgia.

At 20:58 the flight departed McGhee Tyson Airport near Knoxville, Tennessee, on a business flight bound for Tri-Cities Regional Airport at Blountville, Tennessee, with a valid instrument flight clearance.

At 21:10 while cruising at 7,000 feet (2,100 m) the flight was contacted by Tri-Cities Airport TRACON and notified to anticipate an instrument landing system (ILS) approach to Runway 23.

At 21:28 the pilot reported "We are outside the marker" and was cleared to land by air traffic control.

At 21:29 radio contact between the air traffic controller and the pilot was lost. Following an uncontrolled descent the aircraft impacted the downhill side of a meadow 5.5 miles (9 km) northeast of the airport, approximately 0.5 miles (0.8 km) from the outer marker beacon. The main wreckage of the aircraft came to rest approximately 60 feet (20 m) from the initial impact point on a heading of 240 degrees. All four people on board were killed in the crash. A post crash fire consumed the cockpit, center section and the left wing.

== Aircraft ==
The aircraft involved was a Fairchild SA227-TT Merlin pressurized, twin turboprop business aircraft, serial number TT-527, and was equipped with Garrett TPE331 engines. The aircraft was issued an FAA airworthiness certificate on 6 September 1985 and registered number N500AK.

At the time of the accident, the airframe had accumulated 2,294 hours and had its last inspection 50 hours prior. The Fairchild was listed as doing business for Eastern Foods Inc. as a Hooters corporate aircraft and the registered owner/operator was Robert H. Brooks.

== Crew ==
The pilot and sole crew member was 48-year-old Charlie Campbell, hired by Eastern Foods Inc. on January 27, 1992 as their primary pilot. Campbell held a valid FAA Certificate as an Airline Transport/Commercial pilot and had a total flight time of 19,105 hours including 235 hours in the Fairchild Merlin. Campbell was type rated in the accident aircraft as well as the Beechjet 400 and McDonnell Douglas DC-9.

== Investigation ==
The National Transportation Safety Board (NTSB) investigated the accident and released its report on March 16, 1994. During a post accident interview the air traffic controller stated he had watched the aircraft on final approach until it disappeared from view, then heard a pilot make a radio transmission that he could not understand, then witnessed the aircraft lights in a steep spiral falling from the bottom of the cloud level. The aircraft experienced icing conditions before approaching the airport and radar information showed the aircraft slowed substantially and began a rapid descent before the crash.

From examination of the physical evidence it was discovered that neither engine was functioning and that both propellers were feathered at the time of impact. No evidence of any aircraft system failure before the crash was found. The NTSB report stated in part that "There was evidence that engine inlet anti-ice annunciator lights were illuminated during impact" which led to the determination that the probable cause of the accident was "Failure of the pilot to follow procedures concerning the use of the engine inlet anti-ice system and/or continuous ignition while operating in icing conditions."

=== Additional information ===
The NTSB also discovered an operating information letter sent to all owner/operators of aircraft equipped with TPE331 engines by Garrett Engine Division Of Allied Signal in February 1988. The letter outlined instances in which the TPE331 engines had flamed out during icing conditions while descending into warmer air. The engine manufacturer suggested using engine inlet anti-ice whenever moisture is encountered at or below 40 °F (4 °C).

In June 1988 Fairchild revised the SA227-TT Merlin flight manual regarding engine flameouts. It instructed that the continuous ignition system was designed to help the engines quickly relight if air or fuel flow is temporarily interrupted and provided a check list to be used if icing conditions were experienced with the icing protection system not turned on. Following the check list, both ignition mode switches would be switched to "override heat" or continuous ignition. Then the left engine heat switch would be switched to "engine & prop heat". It should then be determined if the left engine operates satisfactorily before selecting engine and prop heat for the right engine. However, the flight manual does not advise or warn the pilot, in this section, of a possible flameout if the above-mentioned procedures are not followed.

== See also ==
- List of accidents involving sports teams
