= Y5 =

Y5 may refer to:

- a Chinese copy of the Soviet Antonov An-2
- the abbreviation of "Year 5", the fifth year of study
- Pace Airlines IATA code
- Y-5 cusping pattern found in hominoid molars
- LNER Class Y5, a class of British steam locomotives
- Y5, a character in the animated series Adventure Time: Distant Lands episode "BMO"

== See also ==
- 5Y (disambiguation)
