= Vanguard Airlines =

Low-cost airline of the United States (1994–2002)

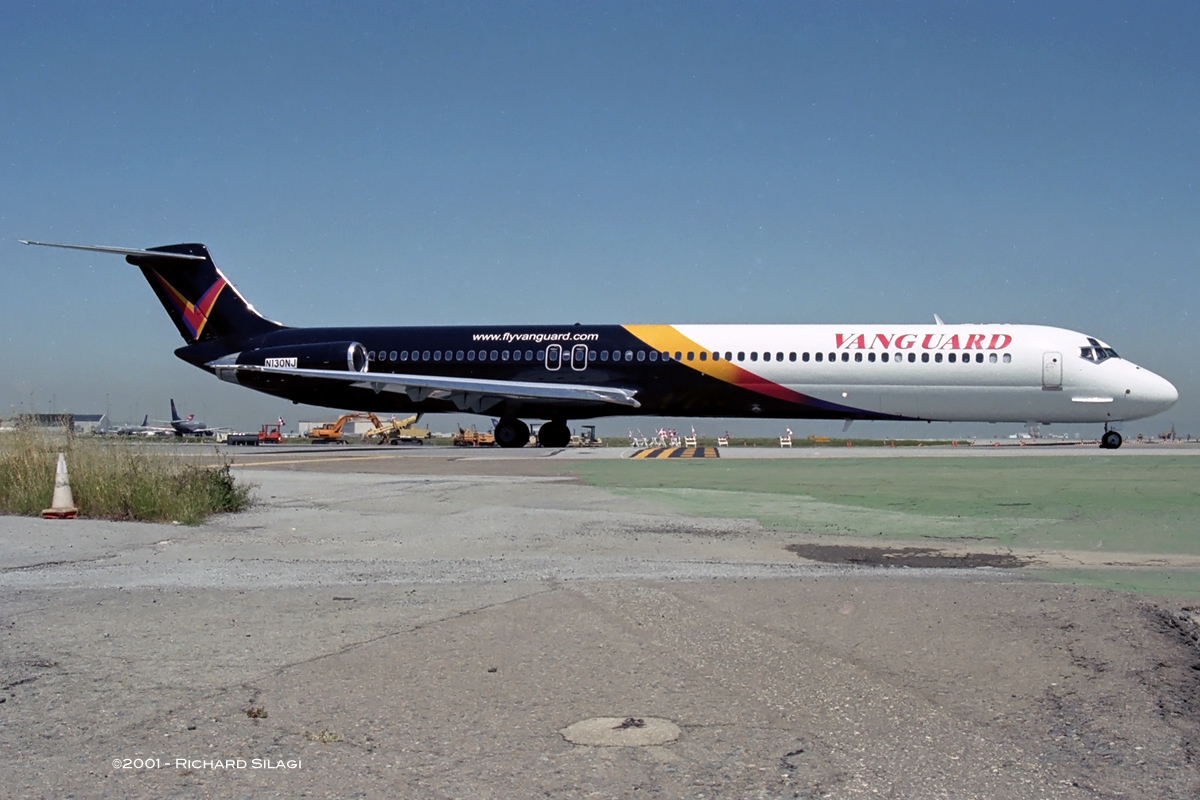
IATA	ICAO	Call sign
NJ	VGD	VANGUARD AIR
- Founded: 1984
- Commenced operations: November 14, 1994
- Ceased operations: July 29, 2002
- Hubs: Kansas City International Airport
- Focus cities: Chicago Midway International Airport
- Fleet size: 15
- Destinations: 18
- Parent company: Vanguard Airlines, Inc.
- Headquarters: Kansas City, Missouri, U.S.
- Key people: Bob McAdoo, Founder and 1st CEO; John Tague, 2nd CEO, First person in history to be CEO of two airlines at the same time and divided this position with Air South)John went on to be CEO of ATA Airlines then Vice President of Marketing for United Airlines and is credited with starting United’s low fare operation called Ted Airlines and he elevated to President of United Airlines. He left United to become CEO of Hertz Rental Cars for a short time.; "Rocky" Spane (CEO and retired Navy Admiral); Jeff Potter (CEO history with Frontier Airlines); Scott Dickson (last CEO); William A. Garrett III (CFO)
- Website: flyvanguard.com (operating)

Vanguard Airlines was a low-cost airline based in Kansas City, Missouri, United States, where it operated a hub from 1994 through 2002. For a time, Vanguard also had significant operations at Chicago Midway International Airport in Chicago, Illinois, until late 2000. Vanguard began operations on November 15, 1994 with a route from Kansas City to Denver and on to Salt Lake City. It ceased operations on July 29, 2002, after filing for bankruptcy. The airline flew leased Boeing 727-200, 737-200, 737-300 as well as McDonnell Douglas MD-80 series jetliners to a number of destinations from its main hub in Kansas City at the time of its demise.

== History ==
=== Early history ===
Bob McAdoo founded Vanguard after operating as CFO of People Express Airlines and then was an Airline analyst of Southwest Airlines due to a noncompete clause he signed when People Express was bought by Continental Airlines. He started Vanguard with just $6 million as a low-cost, low-fare point to point airline trying to capture the same lightning Southwest caught in a bottle, the strategy was to undercut the costs of the major airlines and so be able to charge lower fares and serve smaller cities near the larger cities served by the major airlines. Super-low regular advance fares of as little as $29 each way were the standard. Sale fares of as little as $10 were not uncommon. Also, alcohol was free of charge in the early years to attract passengers. Later a nominal charge was adopted. By the time Vanguard began operations, however, most major air carriers had learned how to deal with such competition. They simply lowered prices in the markets where these smaller airlines flew, thus making it difficult for the low-cost airlines to be profitable. As a result Vanguard only had one profitable quarter in its history during the brief command of CEO Rocky Spane. Bill Hambrecht of the Hambrecht and Quist venture capital firm in the Silicon Valley was the main investor in Vanguard. He also was a major investor in Air South Airlines, Frontier Airlines, and Air Tran Airlines.

=== Destinations during the mid and late 1990s ===
In early 1995, Vanguard was operating scheduled nonstop service between its Kansas City hub and Dallas/Fort Worth, Denver and Milwaukee as well as direct service between Kansas City and Salt Lake City via a stop in Denver with all flights being operated with Boeing 737-200 jets configured with all-coach, single class passenger cabins. By the summer of 1995, the new start-up airline had added new service between Kansas City and Des Moines, Minneapolis/St. Paul and Wichita as well as between Minneapolis/St. Paul and Chicago Midway Airport, and was also operating nonstop service between Dallas/Fort Worth and Denver, Kansas City and Wichita as well as nonstop flights between Denver and Salt Lake City but was no longer serving Milwaukee. One year later in the summer of 1996, Vanguard was flying nonstops between Kansas City and California with service to Los Angeles (LAX) and San Francisco (SFO) in addition to operating nonstop service between Wichita and Chicago Midway Airport, Dallas/Fort Worth, Denver and Kansas City. By the winter of 1996, the airline was operating new service between Kansas City and Atlanta, Fort Myers, Las Vegas, Miami, Orlando and Tampa but was no longer serving Salt Lake City. Flights between Kansas City and New York City were added to the route system by the late summer of 1997 but service to Des Moines, Las Vegas, Los Angeles and Wichita as well as to the four destinations in Florida had been discontinued. By the fall of 1997, nonstops between Kansas City and Washington D.C. Dulles Airport as well as between Chicago Midway Airport and Pittsburgh were being flown with the airline also operating nonstop service between New York JFK Airport and Atlanta, Kansas City and Pittsburgh. In 1998, Myrtle Beach was being served nonstop from Atlanta as well as direct from Kansas City via a stop in Atlanta; however, the airline was no longer serving New York City and San Francisco (SFO). In the summer of 1999, Vanguard was operating a small hub (focus city) at Chicago with nonstop flights between Midway Airport and Buffalo, Cincinnati, Kansas City, Minneapolis/St. Paul and Pittsburgh in addition to continuing to operate its Kansas City hub, and was also operating seasonal nonstop service between Myrtle Beach and Pittsburgh in 1999.

=== Destinations during the early 2000s ===
In 2000, Vanguard had resumed nonstop service between its Kansas City hub and New York City with service to LaGuardia Airport instead of JFK Airport in addition to adding new service to New Orleans and was also flying new nonstop service between Denver and Chicago Midway Airport as well as seasonal nonstop service between Myrtle Beach and Buffalo and Pittsburgh but was no longer serving Cincinnati. By the end of 2001, the airline had added new nonstop service between Kansas City and Austin, Colorado Springs and Fort Lauderdale, and had also resumed nonstop flights between Kansas City and Los Angeles (LAX), Las Vegas and San Francisco (SFO) but had scaled back its flights at Chicago Midway Airport with only a Kansas City - Chicago - Buffalo route being operated.

=== Reservations ===
Reservations were originally outsourced to a call center in Mission, KS run by Dakotah Reservations, a division of Dakotah Direct (now owned by West Business Services). Reservation agents were originally people of all ages from the Kansas City Metro area. Eventually they opened a second call center in Lawrence, KS, which was mostly staffed by college students attending the University of Kansas. Eventually the Lawrence call center was re-purposed to handle overflow calls for the Disney Catalog and the Mission location employees became Vanguard Airline Employees in mid-1998 when reservations were taken in-house and run by Vanguard Airlines. Reservations remained operational at the Mission, KS location until the company shut down in 2002.

=== Reinvention ===
A Vanguard Boeing 737-200 deicing at Denver International Airport.

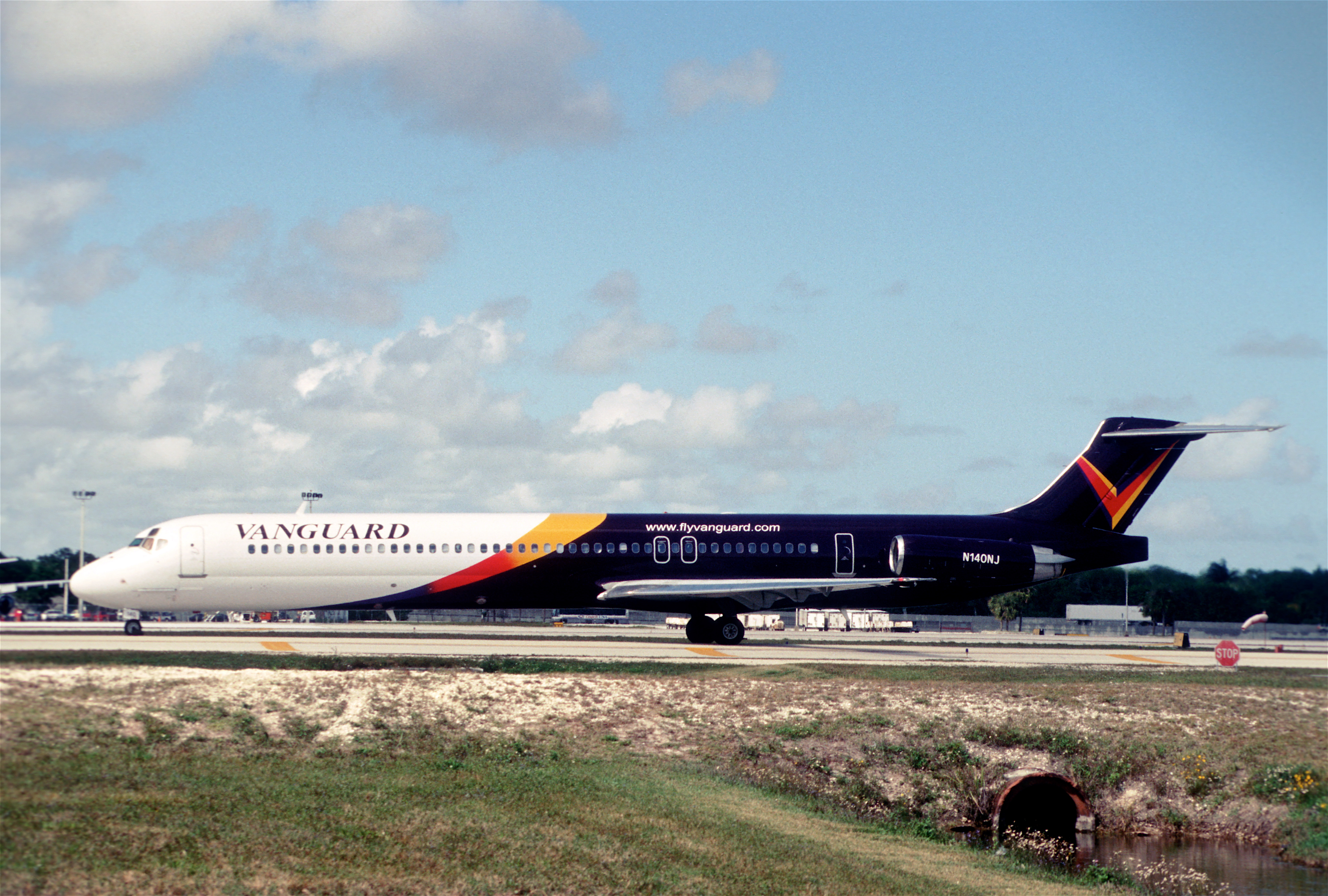
A Vanguard MD-82 at Fort Lauderdale–Hollywood International Airport.

In 2000, the airline began a program to change itself from a Low-cost, low-fare airline to the more sustainable Low-cost carrier model. This type of airline had lower costs than the major carriers, but competed on more than just price. Service, on-time performance, leg room, frequent flier programs, and other factors are often used in this competitive model. No longer were the cut-rate advance-purchase fares well-below the major carriers. Only the full-coach fares, which fewer customers buy, were significantly lower.

The change program worked and the airline saw significant improvements in operational and financial performance. The summer of 2001 saw some of the best growth and performance the airline had ever achieved; but the September 11, 2001 attacks stopped the advancements made by the reinvention program. In October, 2001, the airline cut 20% of its staff. Full-time hourly workers were cut to as little as 32 hours per week. The executive suite took a 25% pay-cut. The airline struggled to compete in a market that saw schedules cut by a third and planes flying half-full.

During this period, Vanguard also introduced a multi-color aircraft livery similar in concept to Braniff International Airways "Flying Colors" or Air Canada's "airline within an airline" concept, ZIP airlines. This paint scheme was adopted with the introduction of the McDonnell Douglas MD-80 Series aircraft and involved the stylistic painting of the new Vanguard livery, in varied hues upon different aircraft. As in the case of Braniff's ultimate "Ultra" or "wet-look", more restrained use of colors were favored by the design team, which conversely was to become Vanguard's final livery.

=== 9/11 ===
As with all the other airlines, that day was chaos for the operation. Airplanes were displaced all over the country. Sept 12, no airlines flew and only a few small aircraft "Emergency" type flights were granted approval from the FAA. It's believed that Vanguard is the first airline to fly a regularly scheduled flight after 9/11, although that has not yet been confirmed. Because of their small size, and many crews living in base, they were nimble and could coordinate quickly. That first flight took place Sept 13, from Kansas City (MCI) to Chicago's Midway Airport (MDW), as reported by the company news letter. The legacy carriers did not fly regularly scheduled flights until the 14th.

=== Post 9/11 ===
Shortly after the attacks, Vanguard received approximately $2–3 million in federal aid, as did most other airlines.

In 2001, Vanguard changed from the Open Skies reservation system to SABRE, which cost the airline millions. Company meetings between CEO Scott Dickson and Marketing Director Greg Aretakis and other staff became more numerous and serious as the year passed. On at least three occasions, the conclusions made by the CEO and marketing director was that the transformation of Vanguard from an Open Skies to a SABRE system had to work, or it would be the end of the airline.

Daily revenue records showed marked increases in sales overall, but difficulties in adopting SABRE overshadowed the successful sales increases. The money that the government remitted to Vanguard after 9/11 offered the airline a new lease on life. It would not sustain the airline forever, but it allowed for a few months of replanning. Companion fare sales and internet ticket hot deals helped keep the airline above water for several months, and the hopes of more funding from the Air Transportation Stabilization Board kept a positive outlook among airline staff.

The following summer was bad for most airlines, but worse for Vanguard. While operational performance continued to improve to summer 2001 levels, the airline was still saddled with $80 million in debt. Nervous about increased bookings, credit card processors required greater and greater assurances that they would not lose money if the airline failed. In his book about the bankruptcy of the airline, Scott Dickson wrote how these processors required surety bonds of 125% of sales to continue processing credit cards. As each ticket was sold, the airline actually lost money. This financial situation was unsustainable and on July 29, 2002, the airline ceased operations.

=== After bankruptcy ===
When operations ceased, National Airlines and Frontier Airlines immediately offered to take Vanguard passengers on a space-available basis. Controversy broke out with other airlines that had accepted Air Transportation Stabilization Board grants immediately following the September 11, 2001, attacks. One requirement of these grants was to accept passengers from airlines that ceased operations for a nominal fee. Some airlines refused and others charged higher fees than allowed under the law. Eventually, most passengers reached their destinations. Therefore, it went into bankruptcy

Not long after the bankruptcy, Robert H. Brooks, owner of Naturally Fresh, Hooters restaurants and PACE Aviation, offered to purchase the airline. His offer was rejected and the company was eventually liquidated. Its headquarters became the temporary offices of the Transportation Security Administration (TSA) in Kansas City, now the home of Entercom Radio.

== Destinations ==
Vanguard Airlines served the following destinations during its existence; however, not all of these destinations were served at the same time.

- California
  - Los Angeles – Los Angeles International Airport
  - San Francisco – San Francisco International Airport
- Colorado
  - Colorado Springs – City of Colorado Springs Municipal Airport
  - Denver – Denver International Airport
- Florida
  - Fort Lauderdale/Hollywood – Fort Lauderdale–Hollywood International Airport
  - Fort Myers – Page Field
  - Miami – Miami International Airport (Service suspended before 1999)
  - Orlando – Orlando International Airport
  - Tampa – Tampa International Airport (Briefly served during the late 1990s)
- Georgia
  - Atlanta – Hartsfield–Jackson Atlanta International Airport
- Illinois
  - Chicago – Chicago Midway International Airport (Focus City)
- Iowa
  - Des Moines – Des Moines International Airport (Briefly served during 1995-1996)
- Kansas
  - Wichita – Wichita Dwight D. Eisenhower National Airport (Nonstop Boeing 737-200 flights from Chicago Midway Airport, Dallas/Fort Worth, Denver and Kansas City as well as direct one stop 737 service from Minneapolis/St. Paul in 1996. After discontinuing all service to Wichita, Vanguard Airlines sued American Airlines for unfair trade practices, in federal court but subsequently lost.)
- Louisiana
  - New Orleans – Louis Armstrong New Orleans International Airport
- Minnesota
  - Minneapolis/Saint Paul – Minneapolis–Saint Paul International Airport (Service suspended in 2001)
- Missouri
  - Kansas City – Kansas City International Airport (Hub)
- Nevada
  - Las Vegas – Harry Reid International Airport
- New York
  - Buffalo – Buffalo Niagara International Airport
  - New York City
    - John F. Kennedy International Airport (Service suspended in 1999)
    - LaGuardia Airport
- Ohio
  - Cincinnati – Cincinnati/Northern Kentucky International Airport (Service suspended twice)
- Pennsylvania
  - Pittsburgh – Pittsburgh International Airport
- South Carolina
  - Myrtle Beach – Myrtle Beach International Airport (Weekly service three times per week plus seasonal service)
- Texas
  - Austin – Austin–Bergstrom International Airport
  - Dallas/Fort Worth – Dallas Fort Worth International Airport
- Utah
  - Salt Lake City – Salt Lake City International Airport
- Washington
  - Seattle/Tacoma – Seattle–Tacoma International Airport (Service suspended November 1996)
- Wisconsin
  - Milwaukee – Milwaukee Mitchell International Airport (Service suspended before 1999)

== Fleet ==
=== Final fleet ===
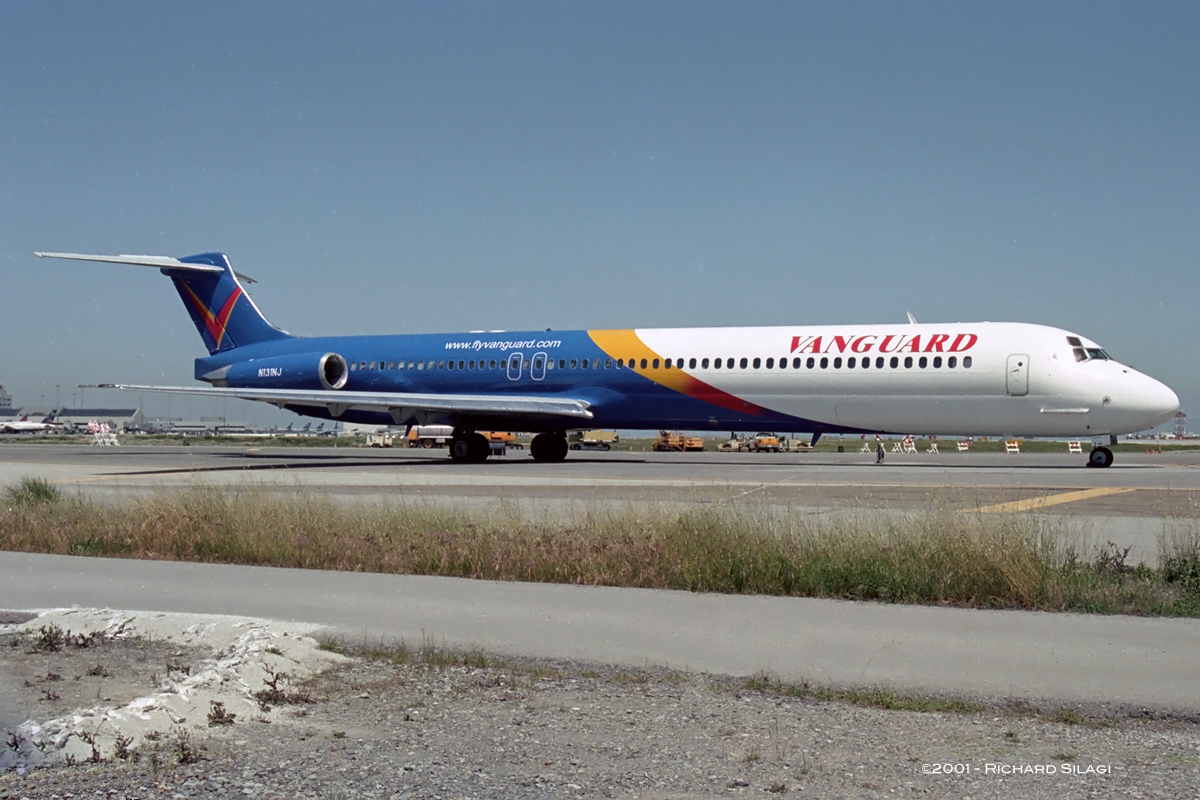
McDonnell Douglas MD-83

At the time the airline was grounded in 2002, Vanguard had 15 aircraft in its fleet including:

Vanguard Airlines Fleet
Aircraft	Total	Passengers (Business/Coach)	Notes
McDonnell Douglas MD-81	1	132 (12/120)	Two class passenger cabin.
McDonnell Douglas MD-82	3	132 (12/120) or (14/118)	Two class passenger cabin.
McDonnell Douglas MD-83	1	132 (12/120)	Two class passenger cabin.
McDonnell Douglas MD-87	2	112 (12/100)	Two class passenger cabin. A smaller aft galley allowed more seats than the normal configuration on the MD-87.
Boeing 727-200	2	164 (0/164)	Wet leased from TransMeridian Airlines. All-coach, single class passenger cabin.
Boeing 737-200	6	120 (0/120)	All-coach, single class passenger cabin.

=== Historical fleet ===
Vanguard operated the following aircraft types at various times during its existence:

- Boeing 737-300
- Boeing 737-200 (Advanced and High Gross Weight variants)
- Boeing 727-200 (wet-leased from Falcon Air Express, TransMeridian Airlines, and others)
- McDonnell Douglas MD-81
- McDonnell Douglas MD-82
- McDonnell Douglas MD-83
- McDonnell Douglas MD-87

== See also ==
- List of defunct airlines of the United States
