= Hooters (disambiguation) =

Hooters is the trade name of two American restaurant chains.

Hooters or Hooter may also refer to:

- The Hooters, an American rock band
- Hooters Air, a defunct airline
- Miami Hooters, a defunct Arena Football League team
- An owl
- A vehicle horn
- An American slang term for large female breasts
- The Oyo Hotel & Casino in Las Vegas, Nevada, part of the Oyo Hotel chain, which was formerly known as Hooters Casino Hotel
