= 5Y =

5Y or 5-Y may refer to:

- 5 years
- 5Y, IATA code for Atlas Air
- 5Y, the Aircraft registration code for Kenya
- 5 Whys, a question-asking technique for identifying causes of a defect or problem
- 5Y, the production code for the 1982 Doctor Who serial Kinda

== See also ==
- Y5 (disambiguation)
