= Myrtle Beach International Airport =

Airport in Myrtle Beach, South Carolina, United States

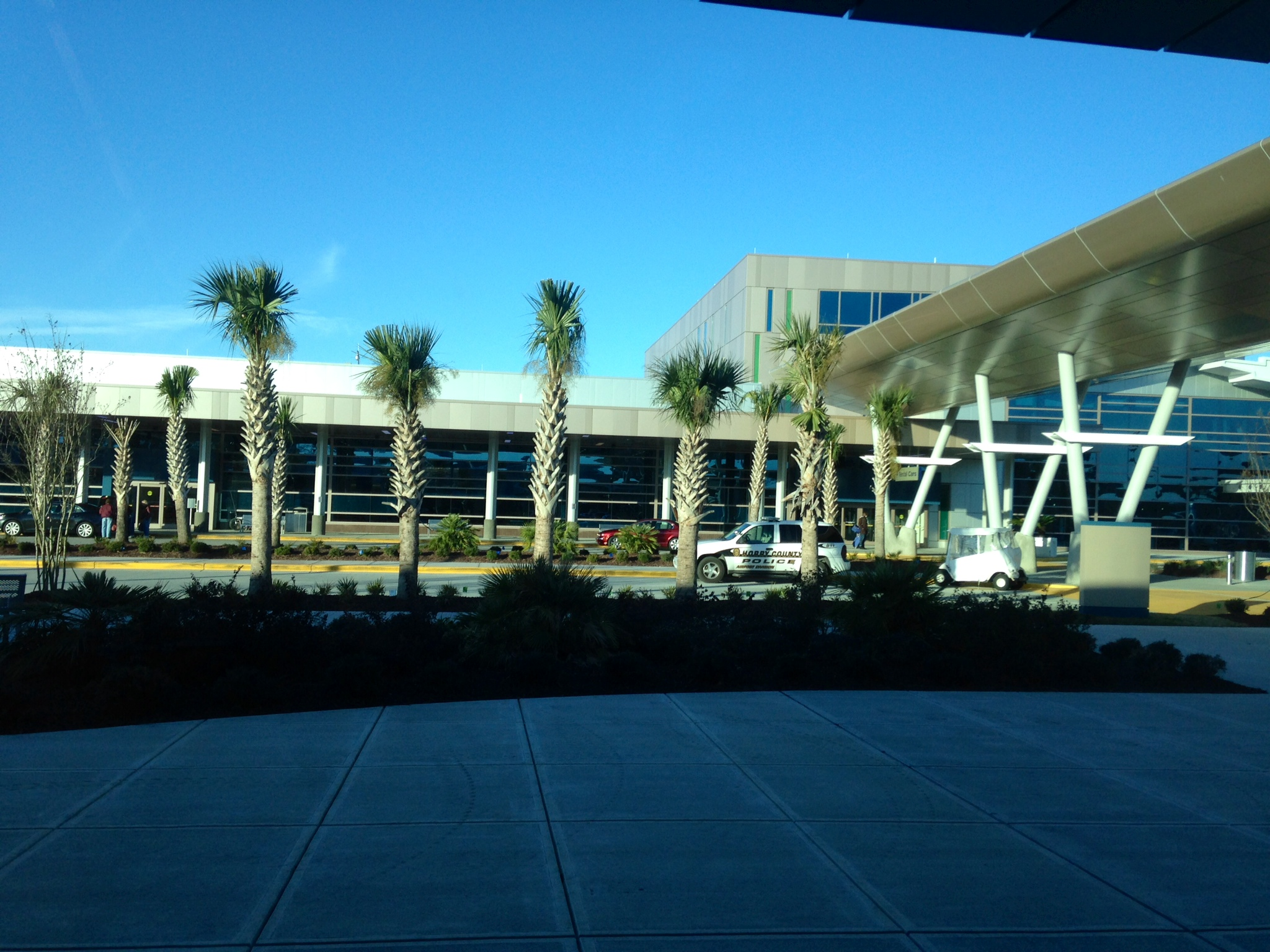
- Terminal at Myrtle Beach International Airport
- IATA: MYR; ICAO: KMYR; FAA LID: MYR

Summary
- Airport type: Public
- Owner: Horry County
- Operator: Horry County Department of Airports
- Serves: Myrtle Beach, South Carolina
- Elevation AMSL: 25 ft (7.6 m)
- Coordinates: 33°40′47″N 078°55′42″W
- Website: FlyMyrtleBeach.com

Maps
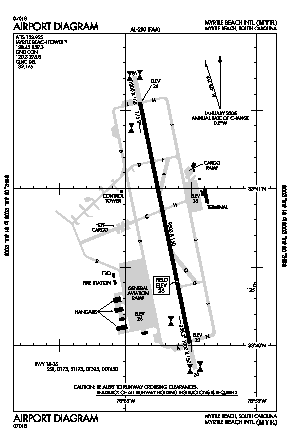
- FAA airport diagram
- Interactive map of Myrtle Beach International Airport

Runways
Direction	Length		Surface
Direction	ft	m	Surface
18/36	9,503	2,897	Asphalt/Concrete

Statistics (2025)
- Total passengers: 3,530,754
- Aircraft operations (2024): 190,850
- Sources: FAA

Myrtle Beach International Airport (IATA: MYR, ICAO: KMYR, FAA LID: MYR) is a county-owned, public-use airport. It is located 3 miles (5 km) southwest of the central business district of Myrtle Beach, in Horry County, South Carolina, United States. It was formerly known as Myrtle Beach Jetport (1974–1989), and it is located on the site of the former Myrtle Beach Air Force Base, which also includes The Market Common shopping complex.

The Federal Aviation Administration (FAA) National Plan of Integrated Airport Systems for 2017–2021 categorized it as a small-hub primary commercial service facility. Myrtle Beach has the second-busiest airport in South Carolina, behind Charleston, with over 2.4 million passengers (arriving and departing) in 2018.

The airport's official website since 2006 is flymyrtlebeach.com, which was previously an unofficial website owned by an airport employee. In July 2012, the airport launched a redesigned website with a new logo.

== History ==
An airport was started on property from a former army base, which the federal government transferred in 1948 through the Surplus Property Act. The city of Myrtle Beach decided not to use the property for an airport, but funds from the property still had to be used for an airport. From 1958 to 1976, these funds went to Horry County Jetport in Crescent Beach, which moved to the northeast part of the base after an agreement for joint civilian and military use of the base. In 1977, the City of Myrtle Beach annexed the area of Myrtle Beach Airport. Until 1993, both MYR and Myrtle Beach AFB jointly used the main runway; this limited civil operations to 30 landings per day and led to a local business movement to build an entirely new airport.

In the 1980s, the airport was served by Piedmont Airlines mainline aircraft (later acquired by USAir) and by Delta and Eastern commuter aircraft.

In 1993, the Air Force closed the base as a result of BRAC 1991. The runway and other portions of the former military flight line were then turned over to the Horry County Department of Airports.

American Eagle became a major carrier at MYR in the early 1990s, operating multiple daily ATR 72 flights to the American Airlines hub at Raleigh–Durham International Airport. By late 1994 this route accounted for as much as 12% of the airport's passenger traffic; however, American abruptly ended its American Eagle hub at Raleigh–Durham in December 1994, cancelling all service to MYR and other secondary airports in the region. American returned to Myrtle Beach in 2010 with a seasonal service to Dallas/Fort Worth International Airport.

On April 1, 1996, Myrtle Beach Airport became an international airport. A new international terminal had its grand opening August 21 of that year, and a new logo was unveiled "to reflect the architectural design of the airport's terminal and the influence of the beach by showing a pained window and a palm tree in blues and greens".

The airport served as the main hub for Hooters Air from 2003 until 2006. The airport authority offered discounted hangar space and other undisclosed benefits to Hooters Air operator Pace Airlines in an effort to relocate its operating base from Smith Reynolds Airport in Winston-Salem, North Carolina. However, Pace decided to keep its base (also used for charter operations) in Winston-Salem.

In 2006, AirTran Airways discontinued its service to Atlanta; it was the fourth-largest airline serving Myrtle Beach International at the time.

Direct Air connected a number of airports to Myrtle Beach from 2007 until 2012, when it abruptly filed for Chapter 7 bankruptcy and ceased operations. The failure of Direct Air caused a slump in passenger traffic at Myrtle Beach, which declined 16% in 2012 but rebounded in 2013. WestJet began service to Toronto in summer 2013 with a revenue guarantee from Horry County, but its passenger numbers fell short of expectations, forcing the county to pay WestJet around $570,000.

The airport was a designated launch abort site for the Space Shuttle, but was never used.

On July 26, 2022, it was announced that Indianapolis-based Leadership In Flight Training (LIFT) Academy would start hosting flight training operations. Leadership In Flight Training (LIFT) Academy instructs aeronaut hopefuls on how to pass and exceed the expectations set by the Federal Aviation Administration (FAA) for commercial pilots, training up to 300 students each year. Negotiations are currently underway between LIFT, MYR, the City of Myrtle Beach about a suitable long-term facility for the flight training program. LIFT plans to begin operations in Myrtle Beach as early as October 2022, sending flight training students from its Indianapolis branch to Myrtle Beach.

=== Renovations ===
In 2008 two renovations took place in the terminal building. In July 2010, the FAA approved a $4.50 passenger facilities charge on all airline tickets to and from MYR in order to defray part of the cost for the terminal upgrade.

On March 16, 2021, it was reported that Myrtle Beach International Airport was working on a 20-year plan that would more than double the number of gates at the airport, however details remain to be worked out. There are currently two proposals for terminal expansions, which both would more than double the 11 gates the airport has now. One of the plans call for 23 gates, and the other calls for 25 and would be built on the east side of the airport. The plan has three possible layouts for new parking with one being a parking garage on the east side. One of the other major addition includes more international flights and there have been talks with two different international airlines. Another possible addition would be providing space for a major shipping distribution center like FedEx or Amazon. The 20-year plan has been finalized and may be presented before the Federal Aviation Administration by the end of 2021.

However, on March 18, 2021, airport officials clarified the airport's immediate future plans stating a presentation showing the expansion of terminals as well as parking lots was a long-term concept, but no expansions will be implemented in the near future. These documents show the early stages of a legally required 20-year master plan, that began in 2018 but was put on pause due to the pandemic.

On April 8, 2022, it was announced that the airport planned a $35 million expansion that will be primarily funded by the federal Infrastructure Investment and Jobs Act that was signed into law by President Joe Biden. The proposed renovations would include adding 4-5 new gates onto the end of the "A" gate that is located on the south side of the building, more fuel storage that will add 100,000 gallons in fuel storage capacity in case of future supply crunches, security checkpoint that will alleviate the pressure created by the current TSA bottleneck, and add more space for restaurants and retail.

On April 28, 2023, a planned terminal expansion project adding six new gates to terminal A was announced. The proposed expansion would bring the total number of gates to 18 at the airport and is part of an effort to keep up with growth, as well as the travelers, including the newly completed parking canopy over the rental car lot. The South Carolina Aeronautics Commission contributed $8 million to the project. The renovation started in June 2024 and was completed in December 2025, costing $93.5 million.

== Facilities ==
The airport covers 3,795 acres (1,536 ha) at an elevation of 25 feet (7.6 m). Its single runway, 18/36, is 9,503 ft (2,897 m) long and 150 ft (46 m) wide. The airport entrance is on Harrelson Boulevard.

The Terminal Building is named for Myrtle Beach's first mayor, Dr. Wilford Leroy Harrelson, who served from March 1938 to December 1939 and again from January 1942 to December 1943. The city bought land for the airport during his first term, and the terminal was named in his honor.

MYR has a helipad primarily used by charter tour companies at the base of runway 36.

The airport had an air cargo building at the entrance of the airport; the building has closed and is mainly used by airport maintenance for storage.

== Airlines and destinations ==
=== Passenger ===
Airlines	Destinations
Allegiant Air	Atlantic City, Grand Rapids, Newburgh; Seasonal: Akron/Canton, Albany, Belleville/St. Louis, Cincinnati, Clarksburg, Columbus–Rickenbacker, Dayton, Elmira, Fort Wayne, Hagerstown, Harrisburg, Huntington, Indianapolis, Lexington, Louisville, Niagara Falls, Pittsburgh, Plattsburgh, Syracuse
American Airlines	Charlotte, Dallas/Fort Worth
American Eagle	Charlotte, Philadelphia, Washington–National; Seasonal: Boston, Chicago–O'Hare
Avelo Airlines	New Haven; Seasonal: Wilmington (DE)
Breeze Airways	Albany (begins May 28, 2027), Atlantic City, Boston (begins May 4, 2027), Buffalo (begins July 1, 2027), Burlington (VT) (begins May 27, 2027), Columbus–Glenn (begins May 28, 2027), Fort Lauderdale, Latrobe/Pittsburgh (begins February 9, 2027), Long Island/Islip, Manchester (NH), Newburgh (begins May 28, 2027), New Haven (begins May 26, 2027), New Orleans, Orlando, Pittsburgh, Portland (ME) (begins May 27, 2027), Portsmouth (begins May 26, 2027), Providence, Rochester (NY), Syracuse (begins May 27, 2027), Tampa, White Plains; Seasonal: Akron/Canton, Charleston (WV), Hartford, Wilkes-Barre/Scranton
Contour Airlines	Seasonal: Altoona, Beckley, Parkersburg
Delta Air Lines	Atlanta, Detroit; Seasonal: Boston, Minneapolis/St. Paul
Delta Connection	New York–LaGuardia
Frontier Airlines	Seasonal: Philadelphia
Southwest Airlines	Baltimore, Chicago–Midway, Nashville; Seasonal: Columbus–Glenn, Dallas–Love, Denver, Indianapolis (resumes June 5, 2027), Kansas City, Pittsburgh, St. Louis
Sun Country Airlines	Seasonal: Minneapolis/St. Paul
United Airlines	Seasonal: Chicago–O'Hare, Denver, Washington–Dulles
United Express	Newark

=== Cargo ===
Airlines	Destinations
Air Cargo Carriers	Columbia (SC)

== Statistics ==
=== Top destinations ===
Busiest domestic routes from MYR (August 2025 – July 2026)
Rank	City	Passengers	Airline
1	Charlotte, North Carolina	216,290	American
2	Atlanta, Georgia	153,730	Delta
3	Baltimore, Maryland	114,880	Southwest
4	Newark, New Jersey	86,900	Spirit, United
5	New York–LaGuardia, New York	79,520	Delta, Spirit
6	Nashville, Tennessee	71,030	Southwest
7	Philadelphia, Pennsylvania	64,040	American, Frontier
8	Dallas–Fort Worth, Texas	46,980	American
9	Boston, Massachusetts	46,790	American, Delta, Spirit
10	Detroit, Michigan	45,360	Delta, Spirit

=== Airline market share ===
Largest airlines at MYR (August 2025 – July 2026)
Rank	Airline	Passengers	Share
1	Southwest	517,000	15.74%
2	Delta	465,000	14.15%
3	Spirit	444,000	13.51%
4	Allegiant	418,000	12.73%
5	American	407,000	12.38%
-	Other	1,034,000	31.49%

=== Annual traffic ===
Annual passenger traffic at MYR, 2000–present
Year	Passengers	Year	Passengers	Year	Passengers
2000	— 1,582,372	2010	▲1,736,138	2020	▼1,113,820
2001	▼1,421,081	2011	▲1,759,874	2021	▲3,210,247
2002	▼1,260,121	2012	▼1,482,554	2022	▲3,459,803
2003	▲1,335,496	2013	▲1,664,917	2023	▼3,361,277
2004	▲1,535,212	2014	▲1,749,657	2024	▲3,837,052
2005	▲1,566,409	2015	▲1,830,071	2025	▼3,530,754
2006	▼1,440,400	2016	▲1,942,927	2026	
2007	▲1,683,823	2017	▲2,277,044	2027	
2008	▼1,565,372	2018	▲2,467,093	2028	
2009	▼1,485,393	2019	▲2,611,563	2029	

== Accidents and incidents ==
- On July 23, 1950, a USAF Curtiss C-46 Commando crashed 1.9 miles west of Myrtle Beach AFB when the left aileron detached after takeoff and lost control at an altitude of about 1000–2000 feet. Both wings failed and the aircraft crashed. All four crew and 35 occupants were killed.

== See also ==
- List of airports in South Carolina
