= Midway International Airport =

Airport in Chicago, Illinois, United States

Chicago Midway International Airport

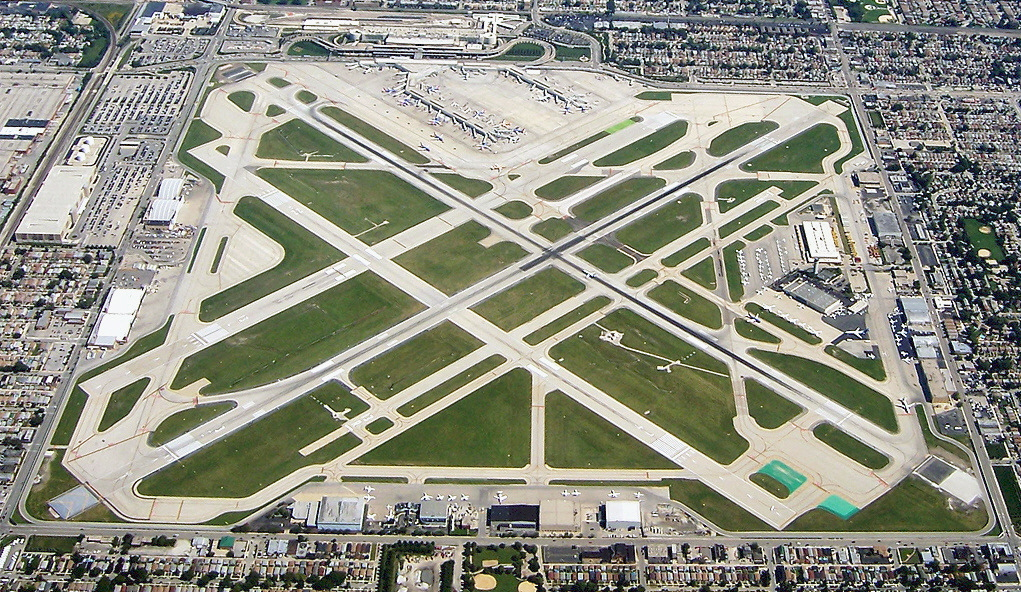
- IATA: MDW; ICAO: KMDW; FAA LID: MDW; WMO: 72534

Summary
- Airport type: Public
- Owner/Operator: Chicago Department of Aviation
- Serves: Chicago metropolitan area
- Location: Clearing and Garfield Ridge, Chicago, Illinois, U.S.
- Opened: December 12, 1927; 98 years ago
- Operating base for: Frontier Airlines; Southwest Airlines
- Time zone: CST (UTC−06:00)
  - Summer (DST): CDT (UTC−05:00)
- Elevation AMSL: 620 ft (190 m)
- Coordinates: 41°47′10″N 87°45′09″W
- Public transit access: Orange, CTA Bus, Pace Bus, River Valley Metro at Midway
- Website: flychicago.com/midway

Maps
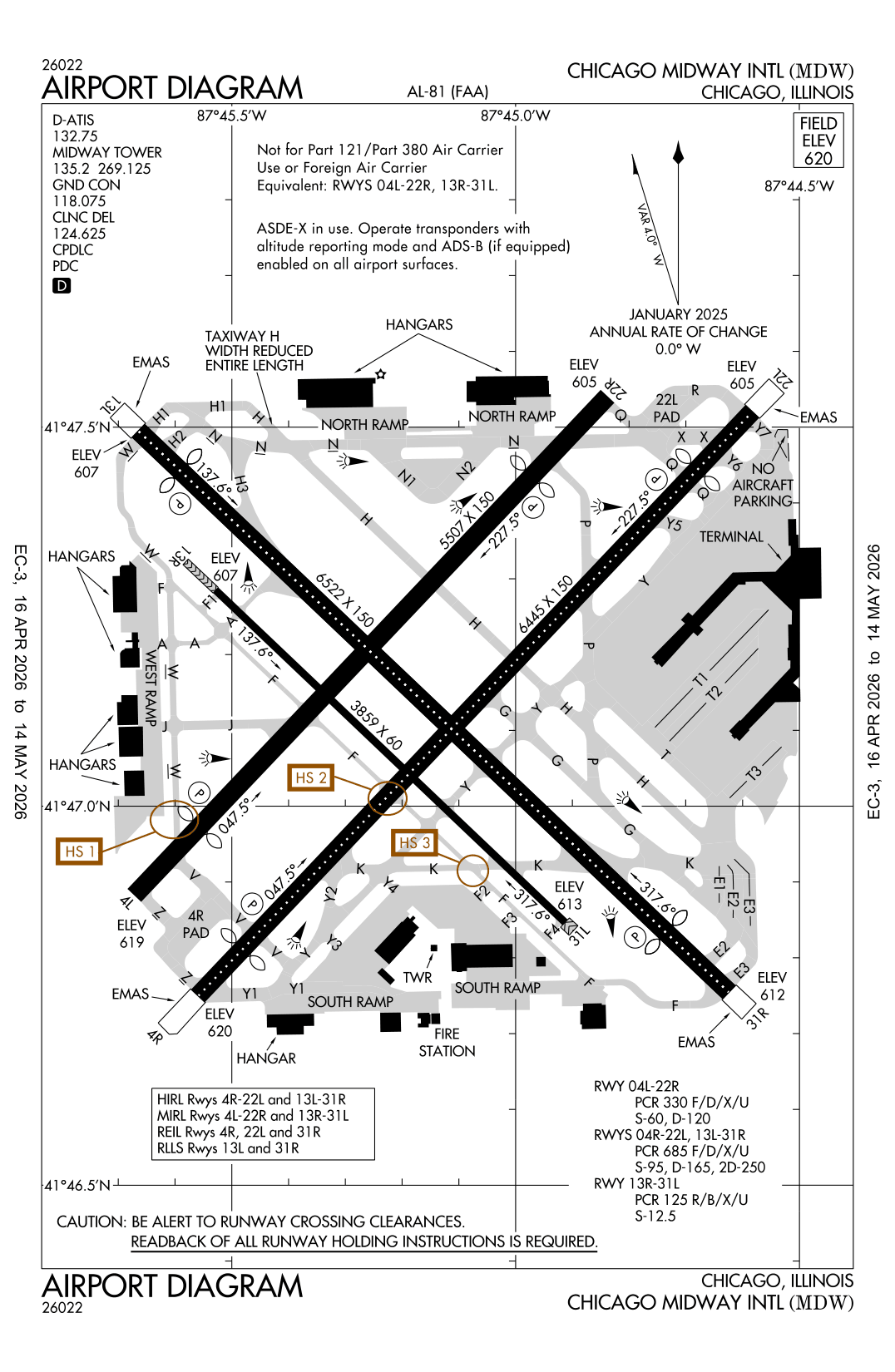
- FAA airport diagram
- Interactive map of Chicago Midway International Airport

Runways
Direction	Length		Surface
Direction	ft	m	Surface
4L/22R	5,507	1,679	Concrete
4R/22L	6,445	1,964	Asphalt concrete
13L/31R	6,522	1,988	Concrete
13R/31L	3,859	1,176	Asphalt concrete

Statistics (2025)
- Aircraft operations: 210,930
- Passenger volume: 19,379,940
- Cargo tonnage (metric tons): 13,529.0
- Source: FAA Midway International Airport

Chicago Midway International Airport (IATA: MDW, ICAO: KMDW, FAA LID: MDW) is a primary commercial airport on the southwest side of Chicago, Illinois, located approximately 12 miles (19 km) from the city's Loop business district, and divided between the city's Clearing and Garfield Ridge communities. Established in 1927, Midway served as Chicago's primary airport until the late 1950s, after O'Hare International Airport was expanded. Midway is the second-busiest airport in both the Chicago metropolitan area and the state of Illinois, serving 22,050,489 passengers in 2023.

Midway is a base for Southwest Airlines, which carries over 90% of the passengers at the airport. The airport was named in honor of the Battle of Midway. The defunct Midway Airlines, once headquartered at Midway, took its name from the airport. The airfield is located in a square mile bounded by 55th and 63rd Streets, Central and Cicero Avenues. The terminal complex was completed in 2001. The terminal bridges Cicero Avenue and contains 43 gates with facilities for international passengers. The CTA rapid transit Orange Line provides transit to Downtown Chicago, where it connects with other subway/elevated rapid transit lines.

== History ==
Midway Airport in 1956

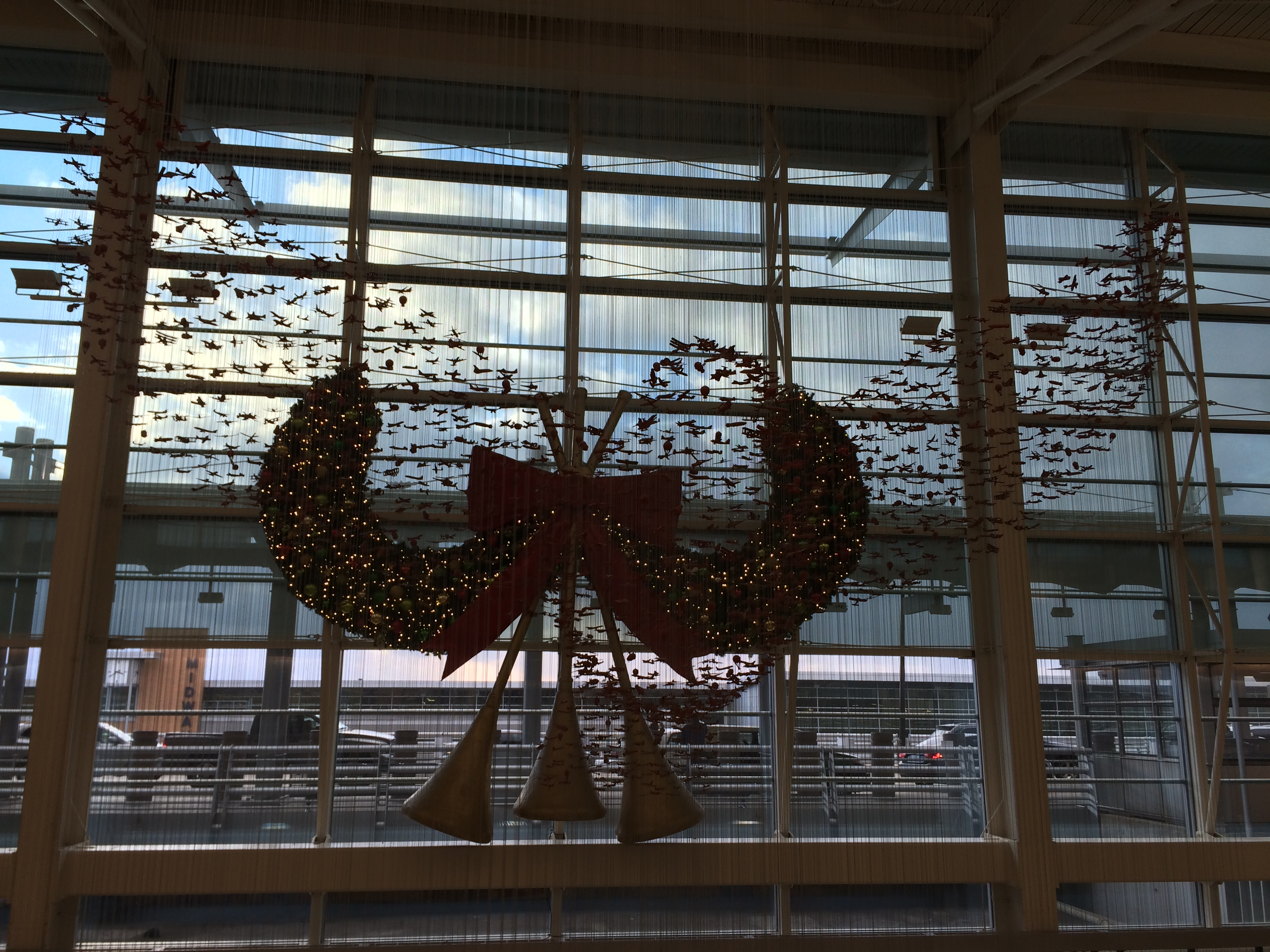
Sculpture at Chicago–Midway

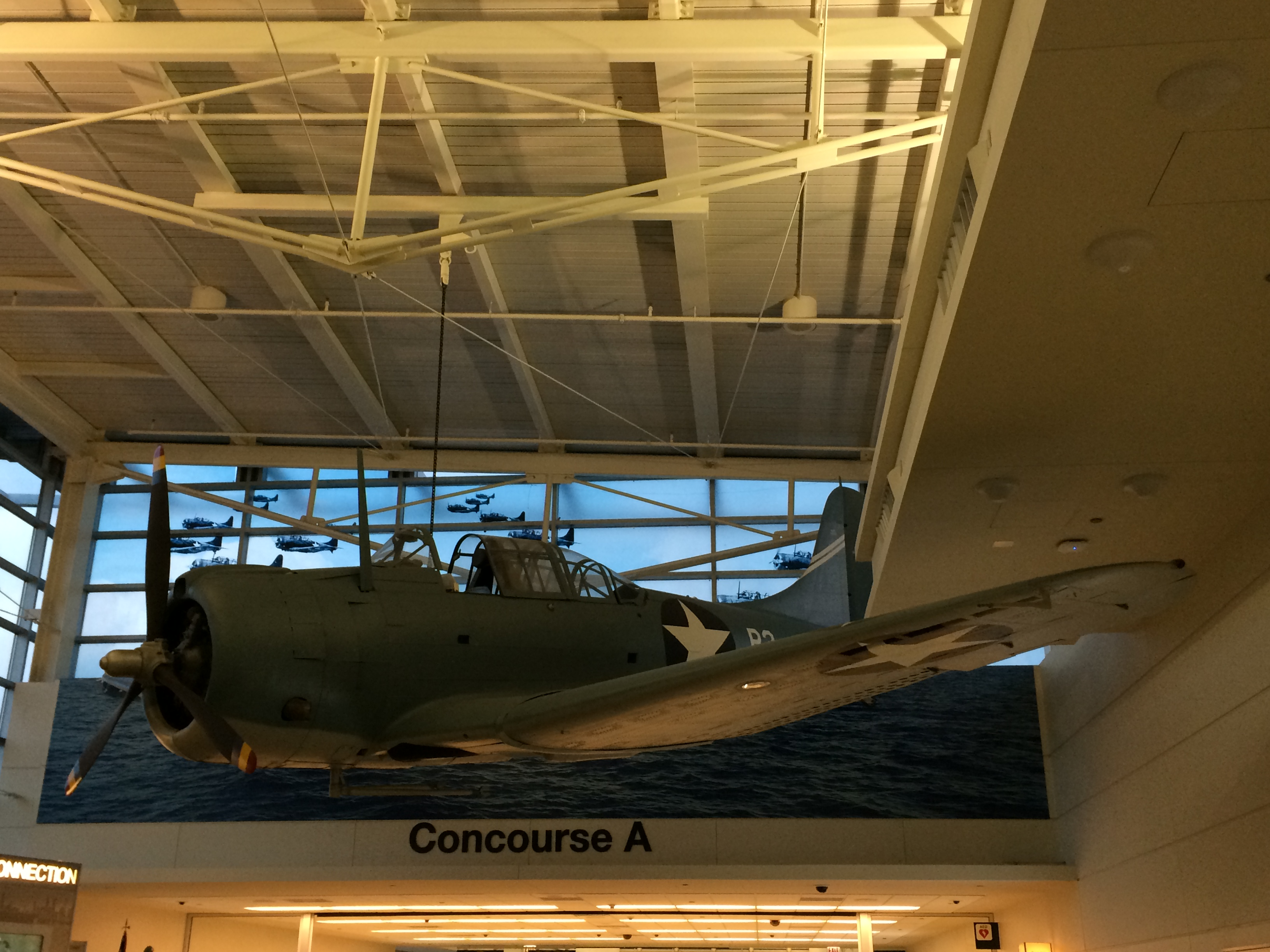
Douglas SBD Dauntless on static display as part of the Midway memorial

=== Early history (1923–1962) ===
Originally named Chicago Air Park, Midway Airport was built on a 320-acre (130 ha) plot in 1923 with one cinder runway mainly for airmail flights. In 1926, the city leased the airport and on December 12, 1927 named it Chicago Municipal Airport. By 1928, the airport had twelve hangars and four runways, which were lit up for night operations.

A major fire early on June 25, 1930, destroyed two hangars and 27 aircraft, "12 of them tri-motor passenger planes." The loss was estimated at more than two million dollars. The destroyed hangars belonged to the Universal Air Lines, Inc. and the Grey Goose Airlines, the latter under lease to Stout Air Lines. The fire followed an explosion of undetermined cause in the Universal hangar.

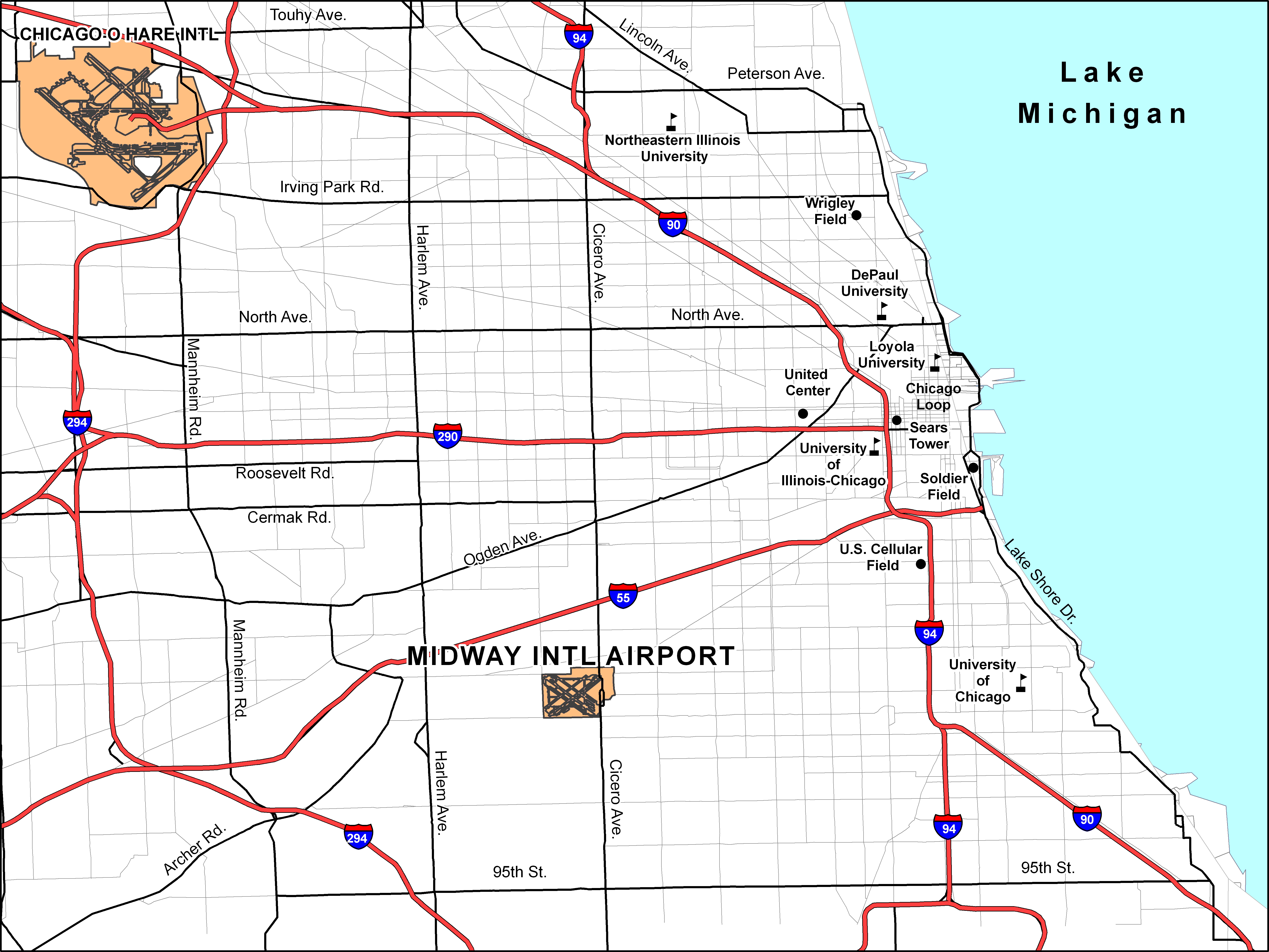
The Chicago area, featuring Chicago Midway and O'Hare International Airports

In 1931, a new passenger terminal opened at 62nd St; the following year the airport claimed to be the "World's Busiest" with over 100,846 passengers on 60,947 flights. (The July 1932 Official Aviation Guide (OAG) shows 206 scheduled airline departures a week.)

More construction was funded in part by $1 million from the Works Progress Administration; the airport expanded to fill the square mile in 1938–41 after a court ordered the Chicago and Western Indiana Railroad to reroute tracks that had crossed the square along the northern edge of the older field.

The March 1939 OAG shows 47 weekday departures: 13 on United, 13 American, 9 TWA, 4 Northwest, and two each on Eastern, Braniff, Pennsylvania Central, and C&S. New York's airport (Newark, then LaGuardia by the end of 1939) was then the busiest airline airport in the United States, but Midway passed LaGuardia in 1948 and kept the title until 1960. The record-breaking 1945 Japan–Washington flight of B-29s refueled at the airport on their way to Washington, DC.

In July 1949, the airport was renamed after the Battle of Midway. That year, Midway saw 3.2 million passengers. In 1959, passenger count peaked at 10 million. The diagram on the January 1951 C&GS approach chart shows four parallel pairs of runways, all 4,240 feet (1,290 m) or less, except for the 5,730-foot (1,750 m) runway 13R (current runway 13C) and the 5,230-foot (1,590 m) runway 4R.

The April 1957 OAG shows 414 weekday fixed-wing departures from Midway: 83 American, 83 United, 56 TWA, 40 Capital, 35 North Central, 28 Delta, 27 Eastern, 22 Northwest, 19 Ozark, 11 Braniff, 5 Trans-Canada, and 5 Lake Central. Air France, Lufthansa, and REAL (of Brazil) had a few flights per week.

Midway, being surrounded by buildings on all sides, meant that the airport was unable to expand; its runways were too short to safely handle larger four-engine jetliners (the Boeing 707 and the Douglas DC-8) that appeared in 1959. Instead, Chicago jet flights were directed to use O'Hare, which had opened to airlines in 1955. Lighter aircraft like turboprops Lockheed L-188 Electra's and Vickers Viscounts could have continued to fly out of Midway, but O'Hare's new terminal opened in 1962, allowing airlines to consolidate their flights. From July 1962 until July 1964 when United returned, Midway's only scheduled airline was Chicago Helicopter. In August 1966, a total of four fixed-wing arrivals were scheduled, all United 727s (United was alone at Midway until early 1968).

=== Post-O'Hare reconstruction (1963–1993) ===
By 1967, reconstruction began at the airport, adding three new concourses with 28 gates and three ticket counters, and in 1968, the city invested $10 million in renovation funds. (For a few months during the 1967 renovation, Midway had no scheduled airline flights.) The funds partly supported construction of the Stevenson Expressway, and Midway saw the return of major airlines that year, with 1,663,074 passengers on smaller-capacity, shorter range twin-jet and trijet airliners such as the McDonnell Douglas DC-9, BAC One-Eleven, Boeing 727, and Boeing 737 that could use Midway's runways, which the Boeing 707 and Douglas DC-8 could not.

In 1982, the city of Chicago purchased Midway Airport from the Chicago Board of Education for $16 million. Three years later, Southwest Airlines began operations at Midway. Midway was a focus city for Vanguard Airlines from 1997 to 2000.

The Carlton Midway Inn moved to allow the Chicago Transit Authority to create a new CTA terminal at the airport on Halloween of 1993. This development helped launch the Chicago 'L' Orange Line, connecting Midway to the Loop. Midway Airport serves as the terminus for the Orange Line, which traverses the southwestern section of the city before encircling the Loop. In contrast to the CTA Blue Line, which operates continuously throughout the day, the Orange Line runs from approximately 4:00 am to 1:00 am, nearly providing 24-hour service with trains arriving at intervals of about 8 minutes. For those traveling during the overnight hours, the N62 Archer bus offers an alternative mode of transportation. The journey from Midway to the Loop takes roughly 25 minutes once the train has departed.

=== Years of ATA (1994–2008) ===
In 1996, after failing to get his Lake Calumet Airport and having received harsh criticism for the idea of turning the airport into an industrial park, Chicago Mayor Richard M. Daley announced the Midway Airport Terminal Development Program, which was launched the following year. At the time, it was the largest public works project in the state. The Midway Airport parking garage opened in 1999, bringing covered parking to the airport for the first time. The garage is connected to the Midway terminal building for convenient access to ticket counters and baggage claim areas.

Continuing with the expansion project, a pedestrian bridge over Cicero Avenue was built in the year 2000, connecting the new terminal to the new concourses. In 2001 the new 900,000-square-foot (84,000 m^{2}) Midway Airport terminal building opened to the public with larger ticket counters, spacious baggage claim areas, traveler information, and a short walking distance to the gates. A 50,000-square-foot (4,600 m^{2}) food court opened as well, with Chicago-style food and retail options.

The expansion project culminated with a short-lived period of great airline diversity at Midway, as Vanguard Airlines, National Airlines and AirTran Airways all expanded their services to the airport.

ATA Airlines (ATA), also known as ATA Connection, whose primary hub was at Midway, took over Chicago Express Airlines. Chicago Express served as a regional airline connecting to airports around the Great Lakes regions.

Following the September 11 attacks, which resulted in a drop of passenger service, alongside other problems for the airline industry, both Vanguard and National ceased operations at Midway, making it defunct by 2002, with MetroJet being dissolved and refolded into the US Airways main line in late 2001.

In 2002, Midway welcomed the return of international service after a 40-year absence, with the opening of the new Federal Inspection Service facility in Concourse A. The Terminal Development Program also included the commission of Flight Forms, a 35 feet (11 m) welded stainless steel outdoor sculpture by Chicago artist Richard Hunt installed at Midway Airport in 2001–2002. Featuring upward-sweeping, wing-like forms intended to evoke flight and the defiance of gravity, the sculpture's height was capped at the maximum limit permitted by the Federal Aviation Administration (FAA), and its surface patina was modified per FAA guidelines to minimize glare for pilots.

In June 2004, Mayor Daley and airline officials celebrated the completion of the Terminal Development Program. The project, designed by HNTB, resulted in the addition of 14 gates (from 29 to 43). A new 6,300-space economy parking garage, including a new bridge and roadway for buses shuttling passengers to and from the terminal, opened in December 2005.

ATA Airlines began rapid expansion at Midway in the early 2000s (decade), and was the airport's dominant carrier prior to 2004, using 14 of the 17 gates in Concourse A. However, after the airline declared bankruptcy in October 2004, scheduled service from Midway significantly decreased.

For over 16 years, Midway had been the main hub for Indianapolis-based ATA, but the airline announced in March 2008 that it would end all flights from Midway on June 7, 2008. Before this, ATA had filed for bankruptcy on April 2, 2008, and ceased all flights the following day.

In November 2008, Porter Airlines, which flies between Midway and Billy Bishop Toronto City Airport, was the only international route served from Chicago–Midway after ATA Airlines, which had flights to Mexico, ceased operations in April that year. On December 13, 2010, a second carrier, Volaris, began flights between Guadalajara and Midway.

Starting in early 2009, a construction project added a new walkway and food court to Concourse A. The project also connected gates A4A and A4B to the main A concourse. Expansions were completed in the spring of 2010.

=== Privatization attempts ===
Chicago has considered privatizing the airport, but the deals fell through in 2009 and 2013.

On April 20, 2009, a $2.5 billion deal to privatize the airport via a 99-year lease fell through, when the consortium could not put together financing. The city would have kept $125 million in the down payment. The consortium operating under the name of Midway Investment and Development Company LLC consisted of Vancouver Airport Services, Citi Infrastructure Investors, and Boston's John Hancock Life Insurance. It was awarded the contract in October 2008 by the City Council, which voted 49–0 in approval to it. The consortium would have operated the airport and collected airport parking, concession, and passenger facility charges. However, Chicago would have continued to provide fire and police services.

In September 2013, Mayor Rahm Emanuel terminated new negotiations to privatize the airport, noting that the process was no longer competitive after one of the two finalists had backed out. The one remaining was Great Lakes Airport Alliance – a partnership of Macquarie Infrastructure and Real Assets and Ferrovial. Macquarie was one of the investors in the Chicago Skyway. The group that backed out was a group that included the Australia-based Industry Funds Management and Manchester Airports Group. The Great Lakes proposal had been valued at $2 billion and would have involved a 40-year lease.

=== Modernization program ===
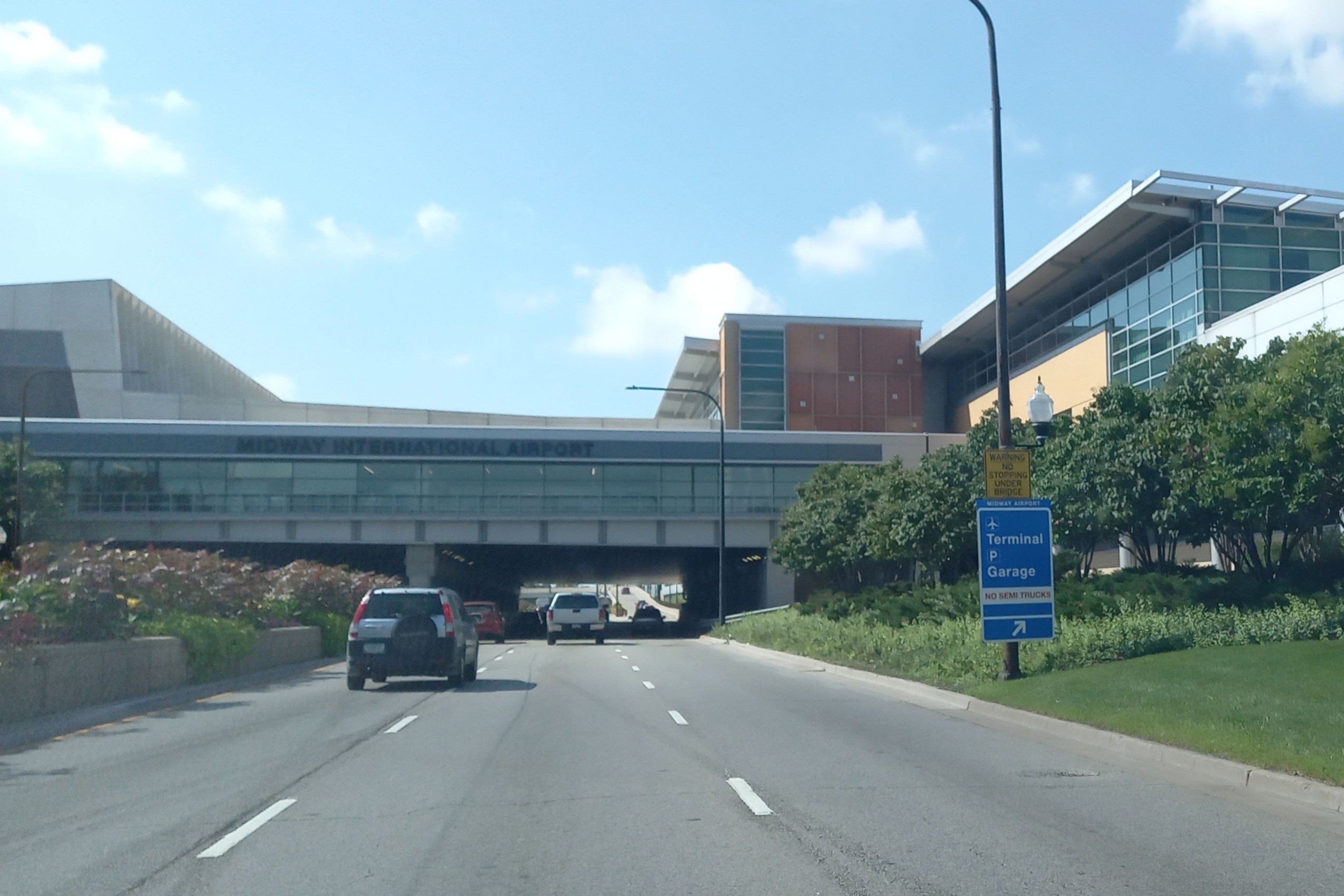
The security area on the Cicero Avenue overpass was expanded as part of the modernization program.

Construction began on expansions of the security checkpoint and main parking garage. The bridge spanning Cicero Ave was widened from 50 feet (15 m) to over 400 feet (120 m), allowing up to 17 security lanes and a streamlined queue. Because the current terminal opened just a few months prior to the September 11th attacks, the security area was quickly rendered too small for the new screening measures and was subsequently forced to expand inward, taking away from space in the concourses. The space that was reclaimed by moving security outward into the bridge will be redeveloped with an expansion of the central food court. The main parking garage was extended eastward over the CTA L tracks to add 1,500 spaces and to streamline the entrance way. In addition to the redeveloped central food court, new concession options will open in phases, including a food court in Concourse A, utilizing previously unused space built during the 2010 rebuild of the Gate A4A/B connecting walkway. The program is the largest capital improvement project at the airport since the 2001 terminal redevelopment and has been fully completed.

== Facilities ==
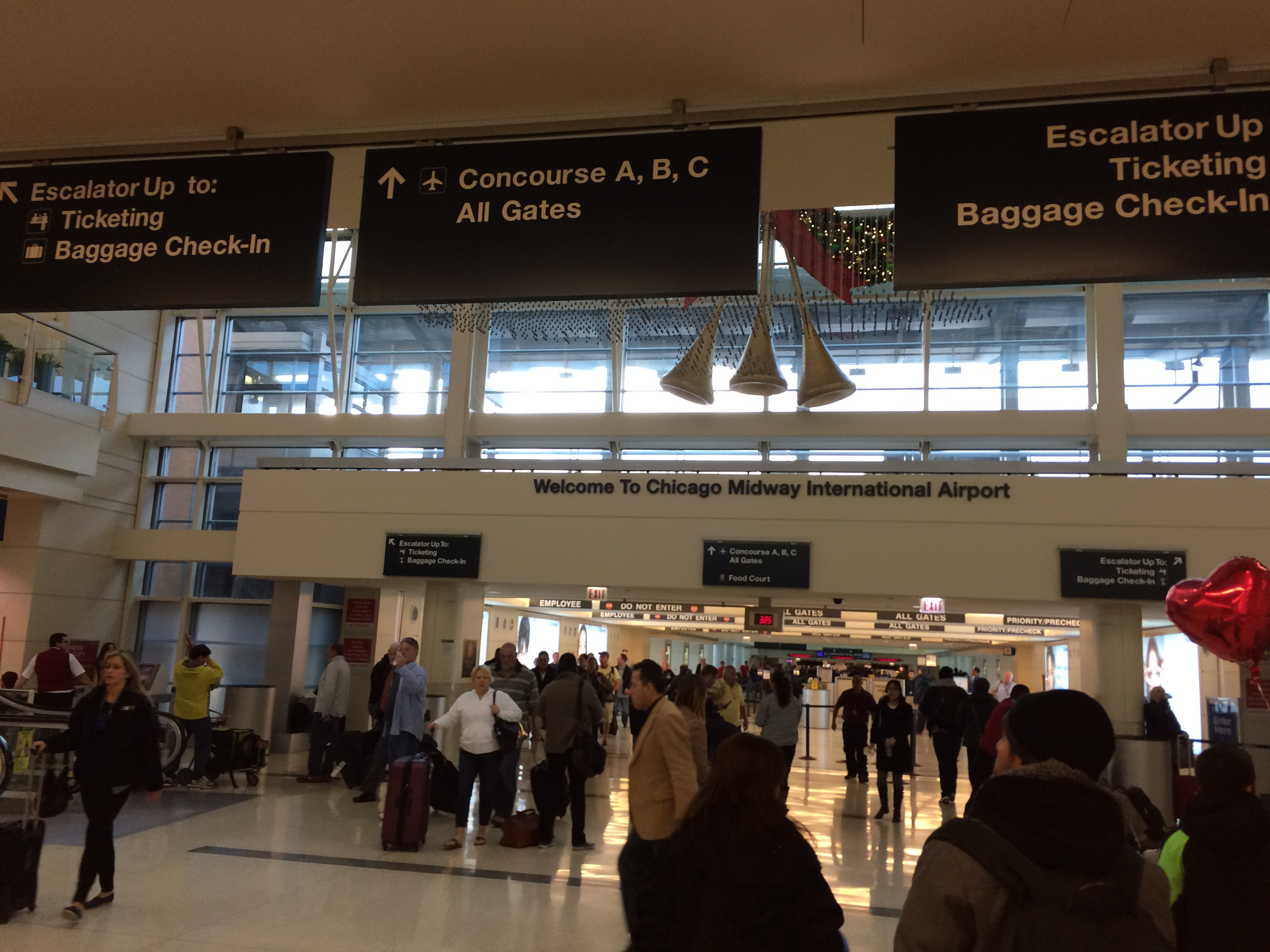
Main corridor at Chicago–Midway prior to expansion

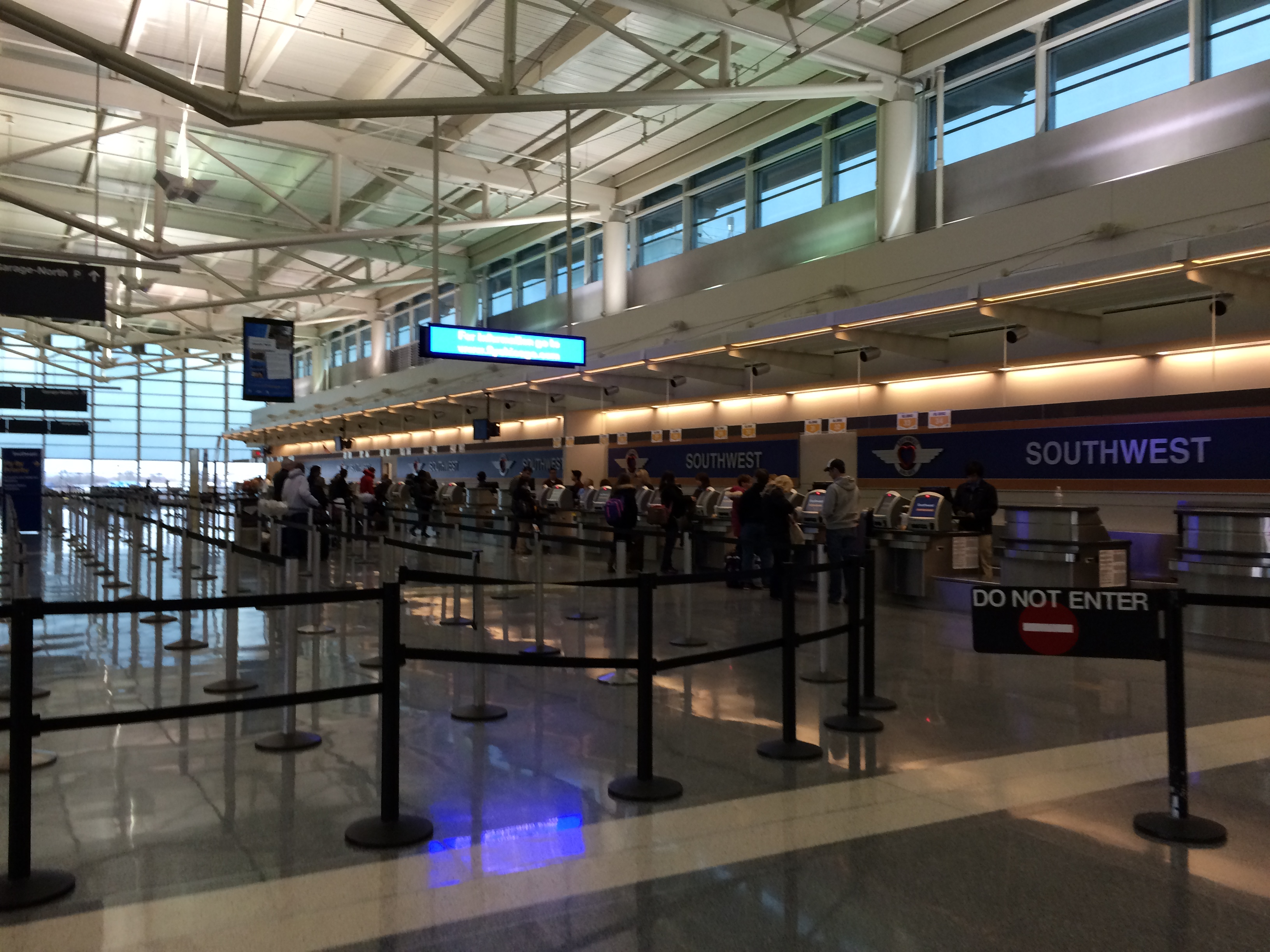
Southwest Airlines check-in ticket counters

All terminals and hangars were on the square periphery. By the late 1970s, the shorter north–south and east–west runway pairs had been closed; some were converted into taxiways. The other four runways remain in use, all strengthened and enhanced, at still about the same lengths. A short runway (13R/31L) for light aircraft was added in 1989.

Chicago Midway International Airport covers just over one square mile (650 acres or 260 hectares) and has four active runways:

- 13L/31R: 6,522 ft × 150 ft (1,988 m × 46 m), air carrier runway, ILS-equipped
- 4R/22L: 6,445 ft × 150 ft (1,964 m × 46 m), air carrier runway, ILS-equipped
- 4L/22R: 5,507 ft × 150 ft (1,679 m × 46 m), general aviation and air taxi
- 13R/31L: 3,859 ft × 60 ft (1,176 m × 18 m), light aircraft only

Midway is surrounded by buildings and other development, so the landing thresholds of the runways are displaced to provide obstacle clearance. The FAA and the airlines ensure safety by adhering to calculated load limits and various weather minimums. Because of the displaced landing thresholds, the runways have shorter distances available for landings than for takeoffs. 13L/31R, the longest runway in Midway, only has an available landing distance of 6,059 feet (1,847 m) in the southeast direction, and 5,826 feet (1,776 m) to the northwest. The largest aircraft normally seen at Midway is the Boeing 757. Normally, commercial planes only take off from, and land on, runways 4R/22L and 13L/31R. The other runways are used by smaller aircraft and, per the US FAA Chart Supplement, are restricted from use by large commercial aircraft, except for emergencies. Former runway 13L/31R was permanently closed after 82 years on August 9, 2023, and was converted to Taxiway H.

=== Terminal ===
Midway has 43 aircraft gates on three concourses.

- Concourse A has 17 gates.
- Concourse B has 23 gates.
- Concourse C has 3 gates.

== Airlines and destinations ==
=== Passenger ===
Airlines	Destinations
Allegiant Air	Punta Gorda (FL); Seasonal: Asheville, Destin/Fort Walton Beach, Knoxville
Delta Air Lines	Atlanta
Delta Connection	Detroit, Minneapolis/St. Paul
Frontier Airlines	Atlanta, Dallas/Fort Worth, Orlando
Southwest Airlines	Albany, Albuquerque, Atlanta, Austin, Baltimore, Birmingham (AL), Boston, Buffalo, Burbank, Cancún, Charleston (SC), Charlotte, Cincinnati, Cleveland, Colorado Springs, Columbus–Glenn, Dallas–Love, Denver, Des Moines, Detroit, Fort Lauderdale, Fort Myers, Grand Rapids, Hartford, Houston–Hobby, Indianapolis, Jacksonville (FL), Kansas City, Las Vegas, Long Beach, Los Angeles, Louisville, Manchester (NH), Memphis, Miami, Milwaukee, Minneapolis/St. Paul, Montego Bay, Myrtle Beach, Nashville, New Orleans, New York–LaGuardia, Norfolk, Oakland, Oklahoma City, Omaha, Ontario, Orlando, Philadelphia, Phoenix–Sky Harbor, Pittsburgh, Portland (OR), Providence, Punta Cana, Raleigh/Durham, Richmond, Rochester (NY), Sacramento, Salt Lake City, San Antonio, San Diego, San Francisco, San Jose (CA), Sarasota, Savannah, Seattle/Tacoma, St. Louis, Tampa, Tucson, Tulsa, Washington–National, Wichita; Seasonal: Boise, Bozeman, El Paso, Palm Springs, Panama City (FL), Pensacola, Portland (ME), Reno/Tahoe, San José del Cabo, San Juan, Spokane
Volaris	Aguascalientes, Durango, Guadalajara, León/Del Bajío, Morelia, San Luis Potosí, Zacatecas

== Ground transportation ==
=== Train ===
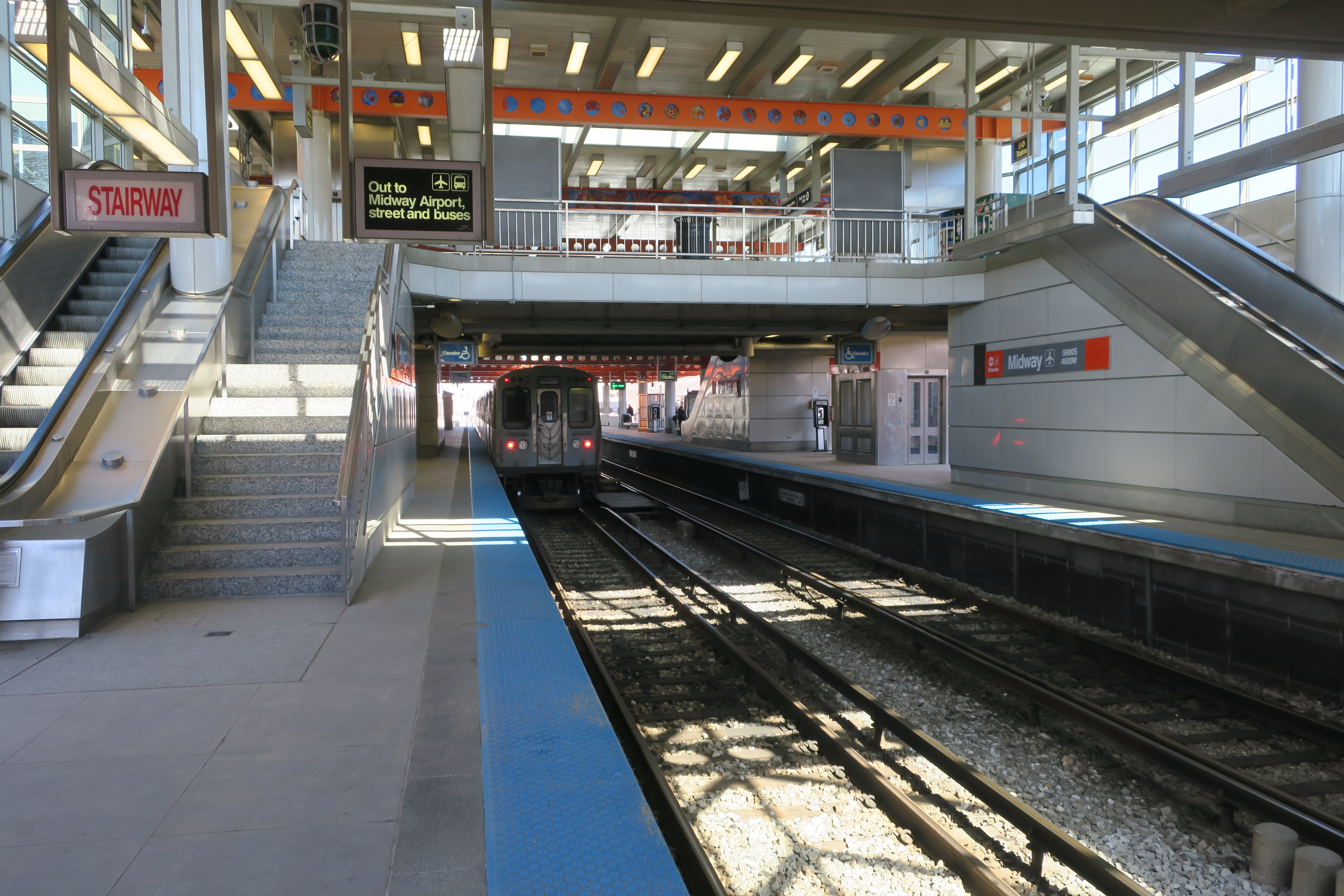
Midway CTA station

==== CTA "L" Orange Line ====
Midway Airport has direct rail access to downtown Chicago via the Chicago Transit Authority's (CTA) Orange Line, part of the Chicago "L" rapid transit network. The Midway station is located on the east side of the main parking garage and there is an enclosed walkway connecting the station with the terminal area. Travel time to downtown Chicago from Midway is around 20 to 25 minutes.

In November 2025, the CTA announced that the Orange Line will operate 24-hour service starting in the latter half of 2026 thanks to the passage of the Northern Illinois Transit Authority Act.

=== Bus ===
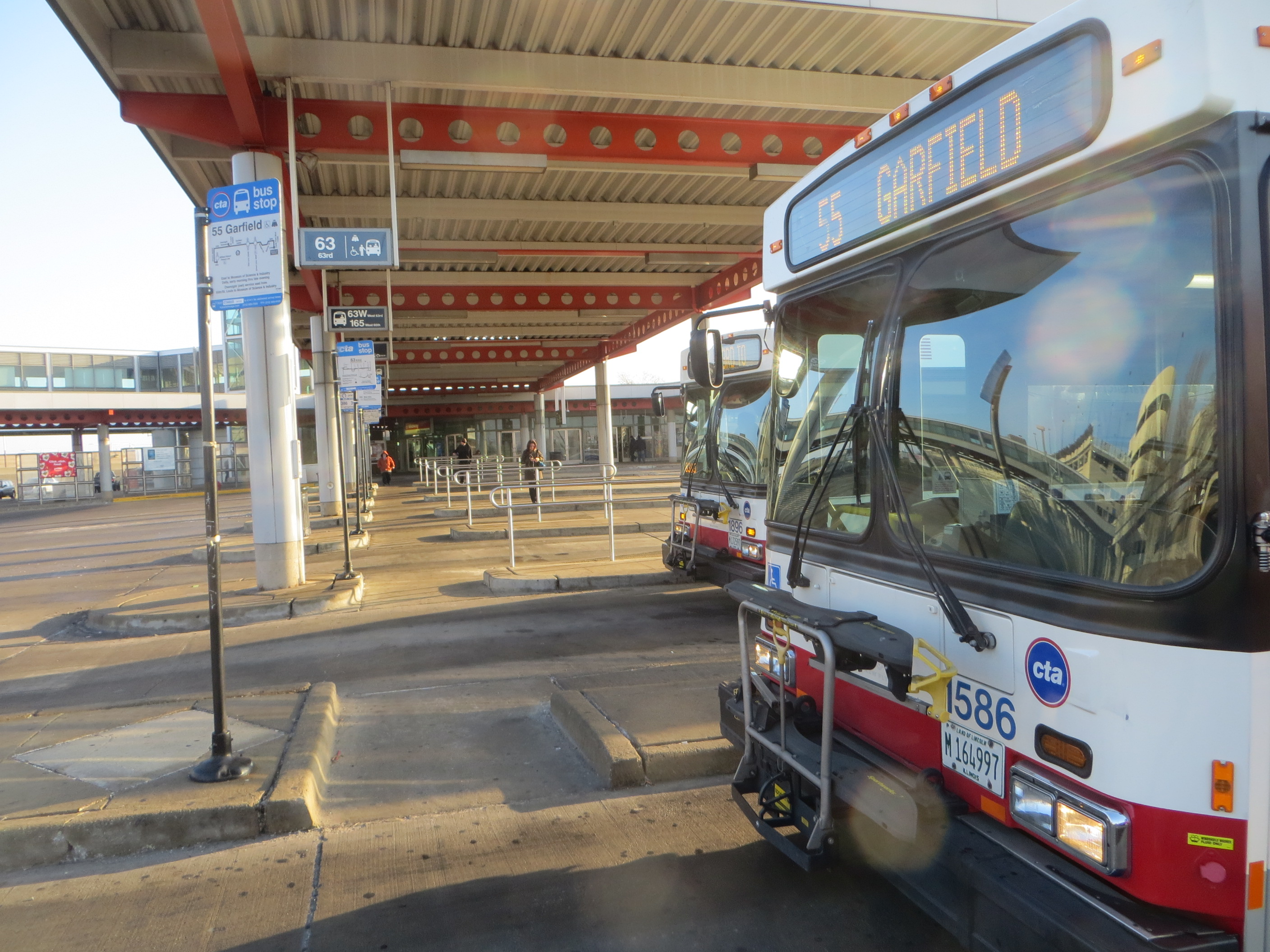
Buses at the Midway CTA station.

==== CTA and Pace Buses ====
The CTA's Midway station is also a major hub for CTA and Pace buses, which provide connections to nearby Chicago neighborhoods and suburbs.

===== River Valley Metro MTD =====
The River Valley Metro MTD, the primary bus operator for the Kankakee, Illinois-area, operates an express shuttle route from the Bourbonnais Metro Centre and Manteno Metro Centre to Midway every day of the week.

== Statistics ==
=== Top destinations ===
Busiest domestic routes from MDW (June 2025 – May 2026)
Rank	City	Passengers	Carriers
1	Atlanta, Georgia	408,212	Delta, Frontier, Southwest
2	Phoenix–Sky Harbor, Arizona	398,528	Frontier, Southwest
3	Orlando, Florida	382,490	Frontier, Southwest
4	Las Vegas, Nevada	350,963	Frontier, Southwest
5	Denver, Colorado	332,682	Frontier, Southwest
6	New York–LaGuardia, New York	309,265	Southwest
7	Dallas–Love, Texas	276,239	Southwest
8	Minneapolis/St. Paul, Minnesota	262,257	Delta, Southwest
9	Houston–Hobby, Texas	253,156	Southwest
10	Kansas City, Missouri	240,956	Southwest

Busiest international routes from MDW (June 2025 – May 2026)
Rank	Airport	Passengers	Carriers
1	Cancún, Mexico	133,783	Southwest
2	Morelia, Mexico	122,819	Volaris
3	Guadalajara, Mexico	79,175	Volaris
4	Aguascalientes, Mexico	70,707	Volaris
5	Zacatecas, Mexico	60,680	Volaris
6	León/Del Bajío, Mexico	52,883	Volaris
7	Toronto–Billy Bishop, Canada	51,884	Porter
8	Durango, Mexico	45,570	Volaris
9	Punta Cana, Dominican Republic	34,188	Southwest
10	Montego Bay, Jamaica	23,844	Southwest

=== Airline market share ===
Top airlines at MDW (June 2025 – May 2026)
Rank	Airline	Passengers	Percent of market share
1	Southwest Airlines	17,399,849	91.1%
2	Frontier Airlines	570,198	3.0%
3	Delta Air Lines	525,809	2.8%
4	Volaris	431,834	2.3%
5	Allegiant Air	101,985	0.5%
5	Others	109,000	0.60%

=== Airport traffic ===
Annual passenger traffic at MDW 2000–present
Year	Passengers	Year	Passengers
2000	15,672,688	2016	▲22,677,589
2001	▼15,628,886	2017	▼22,460,236
2002	▲16,959,229	2018	▼22,027,737
2003	▲18,644,372	2019	▼20,844,860
2004	▲19,718,236	2020	▼8,853,948
2005	▼17,862,838	2021	▲15,893,595
2006	▲18,868,388	2022	▲19,916,643
2007	▲19,378,855	2023	▲22,050,489
2008	▼17,345,635	2024	▼21,513,521
2009	▼17,089,365	2025	▼19,379,940
2010	▲17,676,413	2026	
2011	▲18,883,170	2027	
2012	▲19,516,127	2028	
2013	▲20,474,552	2029	
2015	▲22,221,499	2030	

== Accidents and incidents ==
On December 8, 1972, United Air Lines Flight 553, a Boeing 737-200, crashed into a residential area outside Midway during landing. The crash of the 737-200 killed 43 of the 61 on board, and two on the ground. One of the victims on the plane was Dorothy Hunt, the wife of Watergate conspirator E. Howard Hunt. She was carrying $10,000 in cash. James McCord alleged that she supplied the Watergate defendants with money for legal expenses.

Thirty-three years later, on December 8, 2005, Southwest Airlines Flight 1248, a Boeing 737-700 inbound from Baltimore–Washington International Airport in Baltimore, Maryland, slid off the runway while attempting to land at the airport in a heavy snow storm. The airplane broke through the barrier fence of the airport and came to rest at the intersection of 55th Street and Central Avenue bordering the airport at its northwest corner. Seven people were injured and a 6-year-old boy, who was a passenger in a vehicle struck by the aircraft, was killed after the plane struck two vehicles in the intersection.

List of all major incidents at MDW
Date	Registration	Aircraft type	Carrier	Location	Summary
May 31, 1936	NC14979	DC-2	Trans World Airlines	-	On approach to the west airstrip (later designated Runway 27L), 1 engine out, strong gusts, crashed half a mile east of field. All survived.
December 4, 1940	NC25678	DC-3A	United Airlines	6356 S. Keating Ave.	Pilot lost sight in bad weather and crashed on landing approach resulting in ten deaths.
May 20, 1943	42–7053	B-24E	U.S. Army Air Force	3625 W. 73rd St.	On approach, disoriented in bad weather, hit huge gas storage tank 2.5 miles (4.0 km) southeast. 12 fatalities on plane and ground.
September 26, 1946	NC19939	DC-3	Trans World Airlines	West of 96th Ave. at 97th St.	Midair collision with Boeing PT-17, which crashed, killing two. The DC-3 limped in to Midway.
July 2, 1946	NC28383	DC-3	Trans World Airlines	-	Crashed 1.5 miles (2.4 km) northeast of field. All survived.
March 10, 1948	NC37478	DC-4	Delta Air Lines	5000 W. 55th St.	Plane took off on 36R, at 150 feet (46 m) went vertical, at 500 feet (150 m) nosed over, crashed on 55th St. 12 fatalities.
March 26, 1949	NC90736	DC-6	American Airlines	-	Hit power lines on approach. All survived.
December 8, 1949	NC86501	L-049	Trans World Airlines	-	Landing too far down (then designated) 13R, crashed through fence, ended up at 63rd and Cicero. All survived.
January 4, 1951	N79982	C-46	Monarch Airlines	-	Overloaded taking off on (then designated) 31L, could not climb, crashed on railroad tracks one half-mile northeast. All survived.
September 16, 1951	N74689	C-46	Peninsula Transport	-	Belly-landed 500 yards (460 m) away at northeast 63rd and Harlem. All survived.
March 3, 1953	N6214C	L-1049	Eastern Airlines	On field	Landed on (then designated) 31L, gear collapsed, skidded southwest toward Hale School. All survived.
July 17, 1955	N3422	Convair 340	Braniff International Airways	On field	Hit gas station sign on approach to (then designated) 13R, flipped over, crashed. 22 fatalities.
August 5, 1955	N74601	Boeing 377	Northwest Airlines	-	Landed on (then designated) 31L, could not stop, crashed through fence at 55th and Central. All survived.
February 20, 1956	N7404	Vickers Viscount	Capitol	On field	Landing on 31R, plane flopped in 300 feet (91 m) short of threshold. All survived.
March 15, 1959	N94273	Convair 240	American Airlines	-	Lost sight of (then designated) 31L on approach, crashed in railroad yard one half-mile south of field. All survived.
November 24, 1959	N102R	L-1049H	Trans World Airlines	Came to rest 63rd and Kilpatrick	Plane departed (then designated) 31L, fire on engine No. 2, circled to land 31L, crashed 0.2 miles (0.32 km) southeast of field. All three persons aboard were killed, along with eight more on the ground.
September 1, 1961	N86511	L-049	Trans World Airlines	-	Plane departed Midway, lost elevator bolt, crashed near Hinsdale, Illinois, resulting in 78 deaths.
December 8, 1972	N9031U	737-200	United Airlines	71st and Springfield	Aircraft descended too low on approach to 31L (now 31C) and struck houses, crashed 1.25 miles (2.01 km) southeast of airport, causing 43 fatalities aboard the aircraft and two on the ground.
March 25, 1976	N1EM	Lockheed Jetstar	Executive	On field	Pilot unfamiliar with plane attempted take off on 13R (now 13C), never became airborne, crashed into fence 63rd and Cicero. Four fatalities.
August 6, 1976	N9446Z	TB-25N	Air Chicago	61st and Moody Avenue	Poor maintenance, and first flight of the plane in two years. It took off 4L, lost engine 2, and crashed 0.4 miles (0.64 km) west of field, killing two aboard and one on the ground.
December 8, 2005	N471WN	737-700	Southwest Airlines	55th & Central	Landed 31C during a snowstorm, crashed through a fence, hit 2 cars, killed a child in car on 55th St. and Central Ave.

Source: Civil Aeronautics Board archives, NTSB records.

Note: Prior to 1941, the runways did not have numerical designations. The runway now designated 13C/31C was designated 13R/31L from 1941 until 1989, when a new Runway 13R/31L was built. Runways 27L, 27R, 36L and 36R were closed by 1973.

== See also ==
- List of airports in Illinois
- Gary/Chicago International Airport
- Chicago Rockford International Airport
- Meigs Field
- Illinois World War II Army Airfields
- 2014 air traffic control facility fire
- Chicago Union Station
- Death of JuiceWRLD
