= Wilkes-Barre/Scranton International Airport =

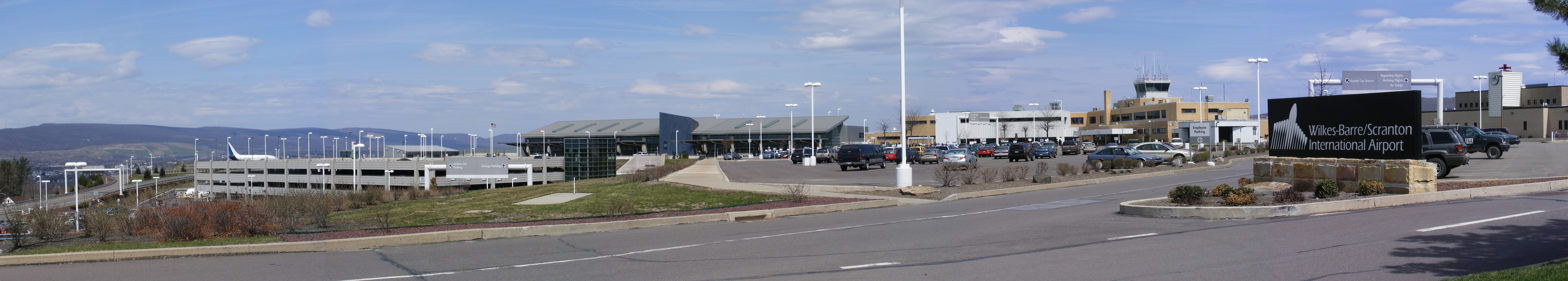
- IATA: AVP; ICAO: KAVP; FAA LID: AVP

Summary
- Airport type: Public
- Owner/Operator: Luzerne and Lackawanna Counties
- Serves: Scranton-Wilkes-Barre-Wyoming Valley
- Location: Pittston Township, Pennsylvania, U.S.
- Elevation AMSL: 962 ft (293 m)
- Coordinates: 41°20′18″N 075°43′24″W
- Website: www.FlyAVP.com

Maps
- FAA airport diagram as of January 2021
- Interactive map of Wilkes-Barre/Scranton International Airport

Runways
Direction	Length		Surface
Direction	ft	m	Surface
04/22	7,502	2,287	Asphalt
10/28	4,300	1,311	Asphalt

Statistics (2024)
- Aircraft operations: 71,585
- Based aircraft: 42
- Total Passengers: 693,157
- Source: Federal Aviation Administration

Wilkes-Barre/Scranton International Airport (IATA: AVP, ICAO: KAVP, FAA LID: AVP) is mostly in Pittston Township, Pennsylvania, about 6 miles (9.7 km) from Scranton and 10 mi (16 km) from Wilkes-Barre. It spans the border between Luzerne County and Lackawanna County, and is owned and operated by the two counties. AVP is the fifth-largest airport in Pennsylvania by passenger count after Philadelphia (PHL), Pittsburgh (PIT), Harrisburg (MDT) and Lehigh Valley (ABE). AVP calls itself "your gateway to Northeastern Pennsylvania and the Pocono Mountains".

== History ==
In the 1920s, cities in Northeast Pennsylvania recognized the need for an airport, and U.S. Representative Laurence Hawley Watres of Scranton, the chairman of the U.S. House subcommittee that oversaw the growing commercial aviation industry, began to advocate for the project. Despite the depression and hard times affecting the coal mining industry, a windfall multimillion-dollar opportunity to build an airport was presented to Luzerne and Lackawanna Counties through their Public Works Administration. It became apparent that a modern airport would be needed for the economic survival of the region. The site in Avoca was first surveyed in 1939 by the County Commissioners boards of both counties.

In 1941, John B. McDade, father of U.S. Congressman Joseph M. McDade (whose name is on the current terminal building) and president of the Heidelberg Coal Co., donated 122 acres on which part of the airport now sits. Most of the land was previously owned by various coal companies.

Many U.S. airfields built during World War II were motivated as much by military defense as they were by civil aviation. The government funded construction of many airfields to develop a network that could be used by the military.

The proponents of a large bi-county airport continued their efforts in the early forties until late in 1944, when they succeeded in receiving a last-minute commitment from the Administrator of Civil Aeronautics of the United States Department of Commerce, with the approval of a Board composed of the Secretaries of Navy, War, and Commerce, designating the project as necessary for national defense.

In early 1945, the two counties entered into a legal agreement to co-sponsor and operate the airport. During the negotiations of on-site selection and the bi-county operation plan, it was agreed that Scranton, the larger city and alphabetical first and closest in mileage should have second billing in name, since Luzerne County had the largest population. Thus, the Wilkes-Barre/Scranton Airport was named.

Construction of the airport took place from 1945 to June 1, 1947, when the Wilkes-Barre/Scranton Airport was dedicated.

Colonial Airlines and American Airlines were the first airlines at AVP (this three-letter code derives from its location near Avoca, Pennsylvania). In April 1948 Transcontinental & Western Air (later TWA) arrived, and All American Airways (later Allegheny Airlines) in June 1949. Colonial flew Montreal/Syracuse- Philadelphia/Washington with stops; American flew to Chicago/Buffalo-New York; TWA flew Kansas City/Pittsburgh-Albany/Boston; and All American had general interstate service and later a looping network to Newark, Atlantic City, Washington, and around again through Pennsylvania. Each airline started with DC-3s. The April 1957 OAG shows 32 departures a day: 14 Allegheny, 12 Eastern, 4 TWA, and 2 American. The first jets were Eastern 727s, in the May 1969 OAG; in March 1969 the longest runway was the 5200-ft runway 4, which grew to 6450 feet by 1972.

The airport became "international" in 1975 when cargo flights to Canada began. Monmouth Airlines, a New Jersey commuter airline, flew between the airport and Kennedy Airport in New York from March 30, 1970, until September 12, 1977.

The airport has had many celebrity visitors. Air Force One has landed with Bill Clinton, George W. Bush, Barack Obama, Donald Trump and Joe Biden for fundraisers and campaign trips. A charter plane carrying Hillary Clinton used the airport during her presidential campaign in 2008. In August 2013, President Obama and 10 year Scranton-native Vice President Joe Biden visited the region for a campaign event. President Donald Trump visited the airport on November 2, 2020, and held a campaign rally on the tarmac.

In May 2006, the airport completed an 80 million dollar new terminal and garage. The terminal, designed by HNTB, has jetways, a larger waiting area, more gates and a shopping and dining area.

A new control tower and TRACON facility opened on August 29, 2012, and was paid for with $13.3 million from the American Recovery and Reinvestment Act of 2009. The old tower's view of the second runway had been blocked by the new terminal. All 25 controllers stayed to work in the new facility.

On May 18, 2017, demolition began on the former airport terminal.

The old terminal was demolished in early 2018. The site is now a parking lot for airport staff and passengers.

=== Former carriers ===
- All American Airways (renamed to Allegheny Airlines, then to USAir, then to US Airways before merging with American Airlines)
- Colonial Airlines (1947–1956, merged with Eastern Air Lines)
- Delta Air Lines (ended in 2020)
- Eastern Airlines (1956–1989)
- TWA (1948–1966)
- Vacation Express (March 11, 2003 – September 7, 2004)
- Hooters Airlines (October 26, 2005 – March 26, 2006)
- Allegiant Air (June 21, 2012 – January 4, 2018)

== Air Show ==
The Wilkes-Barre/Scranton International Airport was the host of an air show between 1983 and 2000. The show was temporarily suspended due to construction of a new terminal; however, it was expected to return after construction was completed. Later that year, reports said the planned renovations to the airport would leave no room for the air show. In early 2017, The Bi-County Airport Board unanimously approved hosting the Northeastern Pennsylvania Air Show at the Wilkes-Barre/Scranton International Airport from August 12–13, 2017. The show, returned after a 17-year absence in 2017 and featured several acts:

- U.S. Army Golden Knights Parachute Team
- U.S. Air Force Heritage Flight Team
- F-22 Raptor Demo team
- U.S. Navy F/A-18 TacDemo Team

Subsequent air shows have not occurred.

== Facilities ==
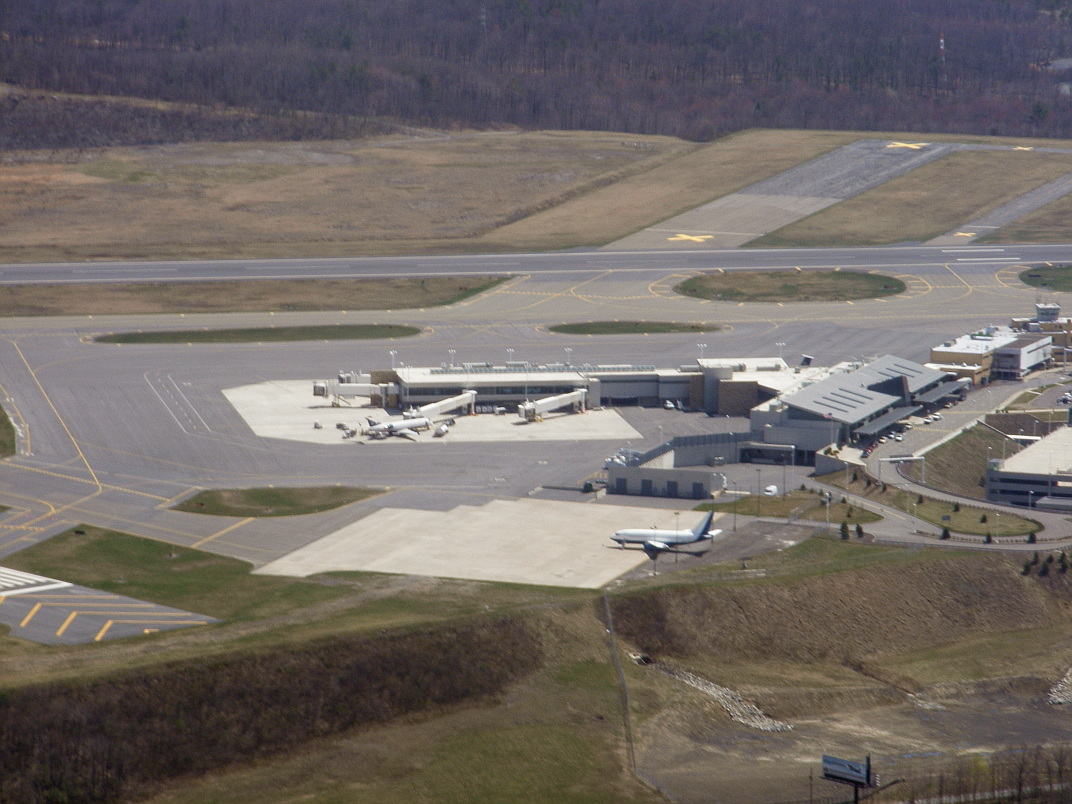
AVP terminal

The airport covers 910 acres (368 ha) and has two asphalt runways:

- 4/22 is 7,502 × 150 ft (2,287 × 46 m)
- 10/28 is 4,300 × 150 ft (1,311 × 46 m).

General aviation uses the fixed-base operator (FBO) Aviation Technologies.

== U.S. Customs and Border Protection ==
The Bureau of U.S. Customs and Border Protection has a property located on airport grounds — on the FBO side of the airport, near the hangars. This U.S. Customs Service office serves as a facilities and crossings for Harrisburg's port of entry.

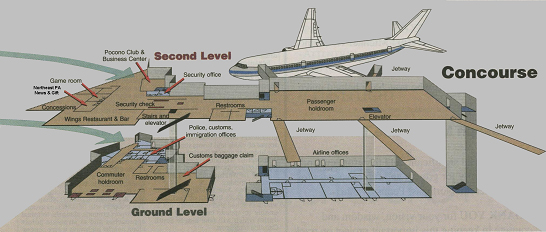
Customs Location at AVP

=== Customs ===
The airport has no scheduled international service, but it has a location to process international flights, on the lower level near Gates 1 & 2, where the airport can isolate international passengers from domestic. With advance notice, the airport can process scheduled international flights or flights that have diverted to AVP.

== Terminal ==
The airport has one passenger terminal with 8 gates. Gates 1 and 2 are on the main level; Gates 3 through 8 are on the upper level.

Gate assignments:

- American Airlines: 5 and 7
- American Eagle: 3 and 5
- Breeze Airways: 4
- The Landline Company: 2
- United Express: 7 and 8

Gates 6 and 7 are used for charter flights and diversions. Gates 1 & 2 are on the lower level. Jets are sometimes parked here if all the other gates are being used or for diversions.

== Airlines and destinations ==
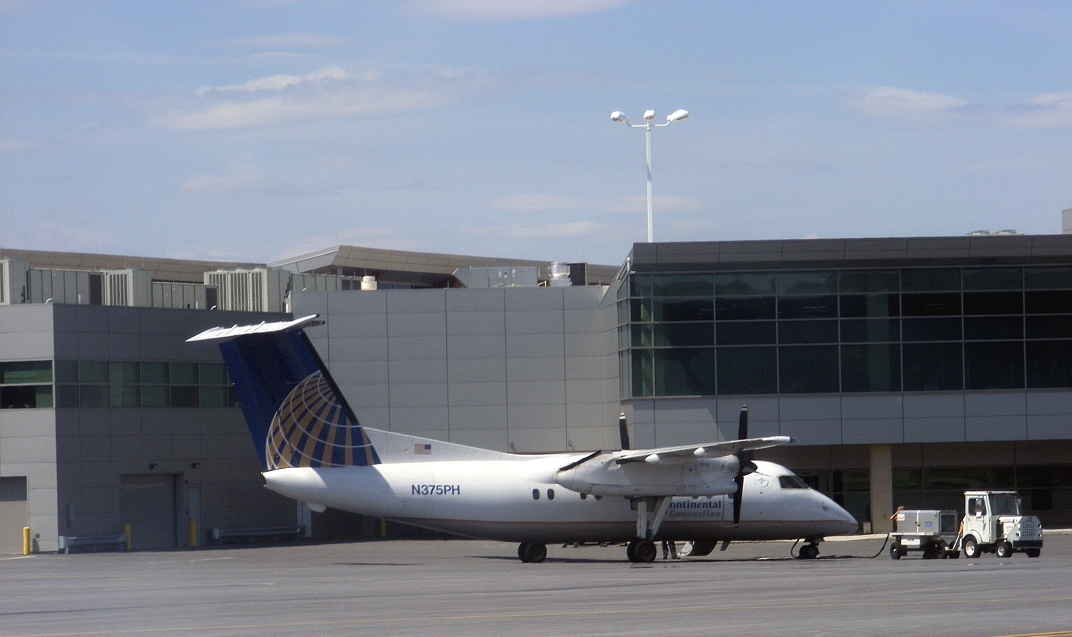
A Continental Connection Dash 8 at the new terminal

=== Passenger ===
Airlines	Destinations
American Airlines	Seasonal: Charlotte
American Eagle	Charlotte, Chicago–O'Hare
Breeze Airways	Fort Lauderdale, Orlando, Tampa; Seasonal: Fort Myers, Myrtle Beach
United Express	Chicago–O'Hare, Washington–Dulles

==== Secure Luxury Motorcoach Service ====
In August 2024, American Airlines began offering connecting luxury motorcoaches to/from Philadelphia International Airport from/to Wilkes-Barre/Scranton International Airport. The service is ticketed and operated as an airline flight but utilizes luxury motorcoaches, given Philadelphia's close proximity to Wilkes-Barre/Scranton and available connections as a major hub for American Airlines. This airside-to-airside service, which is solely for screened passengers who booked a seat on the route, is operated by American's bus service partner, Landline, on American's behalf.

Airline shuttles
Operators	Destinations	Notes	Refs
American Airlines (operated by Landline)	Philadelphia	Passengers check bags and clear security at AVP, and go directly to PHL via motorcoach	

=== Cargo ===
Airlines	Destinations
FedEx Express	Seasonal: Allentown

== Statistics ==
=== Top destinations ===
Busiest domestic routes from AVP (July 2025 – June 2026)
Rank	City	Passengers	Carriers
1	Charlotte, North Carolina	72,390	American
2	Chicago-O'Hare, Illinois	65,740	American, United
3	Washington-Dulles, Virginia	30,310	United
4	Orlando, Florida	23,840	Breeze
5	Tampa, Florida	11,550	Breeze
7	Myrtle Beach, South Carolina	7,770	Breeze
8	Fort Myers, Florida	6,560	Breeze

=== Carrier Shares ===
Carrier shares (July 2025 – June 2026) Based on enplaned passengers both departing and arriving.
Carrier	Passengers (arriving and departing)
Breeze	96,610(22.37%)
PSA	93,190(21.58%)
Envoy	70,130(16.24%)
CommuteAir	59,490(13.78%)
GoJet	53,160(12.31%)
Other	59,260(13.72%)

Other consists of carrier that serve AVP including American Airlines, Piedmont Airlines, and SkyWest Airlines.

=== Annual traffic ===
Traffic by calendar year
Year	Passengers	Change	Year	Passengers	Change
2001	375,508	—	2013	433,137	▼2.80%
2002	404,201	▲7.73%	2014	427,920	▼1.20%
2003	362,719	▼10.26%	2015	439,128	▲2.62%
2004	401,164	▲10.60%	2016	462,999	▲5.44%
2005	439,189	▲9.48%	2017	531,854	▲14.87%
2006	422,608	▼3.78%	2018	527,928	▼0.74%
2007	438,895	▲3.85%	2019	590,044	▲11.77%
2008	443,804	▲1.12%	2020	221,781	▼62.41%
2009	413,001	▼6.94%	2021	313,107	▲41.18%
2010	433,972	▲5.08%	2022	384,371	▲22.76%
2011	464,560	▲7.05%	2023	357,969	▼6.87%
2012	445,593	▼4.08%			

== Ground transportation ==
=== Car ===
The airport has direct access to I-81 via Exit 178. The Pennsylvania Turnpike (Interstate 476) can also be accessed from I-81 Southbound via Exit 175.

=== Bus ===
Public transit
System	Route(s)	Refs
LCTA	On Demand via LCTA Connects	

The Luzerne County Transportation Authority offers flexibility at your fingertips with their new Microtransit Service "LCTA CONNECTS".

Tarmac-to-tarmac shuttle
Operator	Destination	Notes	Refs
American Airlines (operated by Landline)	Philadelphia	Passengers check bags and clear security at AVP, and go directly to PHL via motorcoach	

In August 2024, American Airlines began offering connecting luxury motorcoaches to/from Philadelphia International Airport from/to Wilkes-Barre/Scranton International Airport. The service is ticketed and operated as an airline flight but utilizes luxury motorcoaches, given Philadelphia's close proximity to Wilkes-Barre/Scranton and available connections as a major hub for American Airlines. This airside-to-airside service, which is solely for screened passengers who booked a seat on the route, is operated by American's bus service partner, Landline, on the airline's behalf.

=== Car Rentals, TNCs and Taxi Service ===
The following rental car companies provide their services at AVP: Avis, Budget, Dollar, Enterprise, Hertz and National. The rental car lot is across from the Terminal Building. With regards to Transportation Network Companies, or TNCs, Uber and Lyft have specific pick-up locations in front of the Terminal Building, on the arrivals side. Taxi service is provided by Burgit's City Taxi, Call-a-Car Taxi and McCarthy Flowered Cabs.

== Accidents and incidents ==
- On April 20, 1985, AF ser. No. 62-4496, a USAF CT-39A experienced brake failure on landing at the Wilkes-Barre Scranton International Airport, killing all five passengers and crew aboard, including General Jerome F. O'Malley, Commander, Tactical Air Command, and his wife.
- On May 21, 2000, Bear Creek Township was the site of a crash of an Executive Airlines chartered Jetstream 31, it crashed while attempting to land at Wilkes-Barre/Scranton. As described by the BBC, the crash occurred in a "wooded area" of the township, near the intersection of Bear Creek Boulevard (PA-Route 115) and the Northeast Extension of the Pennsylvania Turnpike. The accident killed the pilot and all 19 passengers. NTSB investigation ruled that the crash was probably due to low fuel. The incident spurred an FBI investigation and made news across the globe. Passenger safety in the aviation field became a major issue of the 2000 U.S. presidential election.
- On August 20, 2021, a North American T-6 Texan crashed shortly after takeoff, killing the sole pilot. The aircraft was practicing for an upcoming airshow at Pocono Raceway as part of the Skytypers Air Show Team. A preliminary report from the National Transportation Safety Board has been released.

== See also ==
- List of airports in Pennsylvania
