= Hooters Air =

United States airline (2003–2006)

IATA	ICAO	Call sign
H1; Y5	PCE	PACE
- Founded: 2003; 23 years ago
- Commenced operations: March 6, 2003; 23 years ago
- Ceased operations: April 17, 2006; 20 years ago
- Fleet size: 7
- Destinations: 17
- Parent company: Pace Airlines
- Headquarters: Myrtle Beach, South Carolina, United States
- Founder: Robert H. Brooks

Hooters Air was an airline headquartered in Myrtle Beach, South Carolina, United States. It operated from March 6, 2003, until it ceased commercial flights on April 17, 2006. Hooters Air flights were operated by Winston-Salem, North Carolina–based Pace Airlines both as ad hoc private charters and as scheduled USDOT public charters. As such, flights operated both under Pace Airlines' IATA Code of Y5 for ad hoc charters, and under its own IATA Code of H1 for public charters.

== History ==
The airline was established in 2003 and started operations on March 6, 2003. It was founded by Hooters of America restaurant owner Robert Brooks, who acquired Pace Airlines in December 2002. All flights were operated by Pace Airlines. Hooters Air was owned by Hooters of America, Inc. Brooks initially envisioned Hooters Air as an unconventional means of generating awareness for the Hooters restaurant brand; the carrier was sometimes referred to as a "flying billboard" for the restaurant chain.

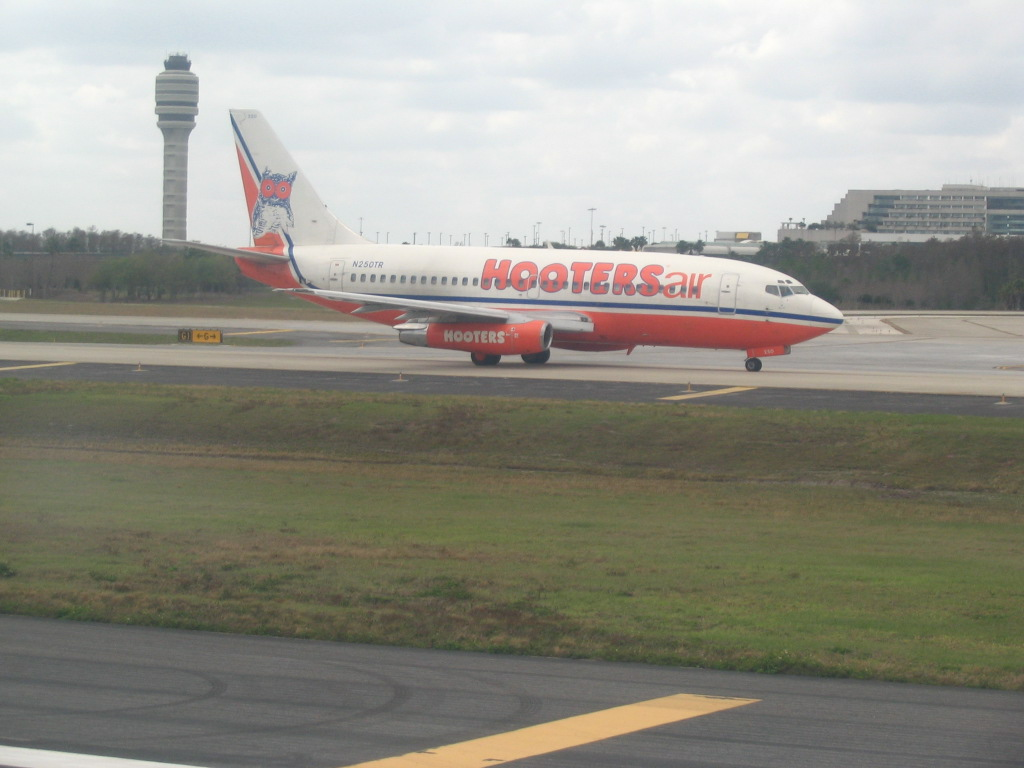
Hooters Air Boeing 737-200 waiting on the ramp at Orlando International Airport

Aside from its unorthodox neighborhood chain-restaurant tie-in, Hooters Air sought to differentiate itself from other carriers with a distinctive style of in-flight service. The carrier was marketed towards golfers in an effort to bring casual and tournament players to Myrtle Beach's 100+ championship golf courses. Two "Hooters Girls," dressed in their restaurant uniforms, were on each flight assisting the (traditionally attired) in-flight crews with hospitality duties. The company advertised nonstop flights for most routes, including slogans like "Fly a mile high with us." Although Hooters Air billed itself as a low-fare carrier, rows of seats were removed from the aircraft to provide a 34-inch (86 cm) seating pitch to all passengers, comparable to the legroom offered by many carriers' business classes; in keeping with the golf-friendly orientation of the carrier, this was called "Club Class" seating. Additionally, all seats were upholstered in dark blue or black leather, and all aircraft were painted in Hooters' orange and white company colors featuring the company logo, and mascot ("Hootie the Owl"), on the vertical stabilizer. Also, at a time when many low-cost carriers were eliminating in-flight frills in an effort to curtail expenses, Hooters Air served complimentary meals to all customers on trips lasting over one hour.

On December 8, 2005, Hooters announced that it would end service to Rockford, Illinois on January 5, 2006, as a result of the airport authority bringing in a competing airline (United Airlines) on its Rockford-Denver route, and providing revenue guarantees for the competitor.

All commercial services were suspended on January 9, 2006. Parent company Pace Airlines continued with charter services for another three years, ceasing operations in September 2009. On April 17, 2006, Hooters Air ceased operations, with its last flight going from Myrtle Beach to Newark, halting scheduled public charter service and refunding tickets. The company attributed this cessation of service primarily to a marked increase in fuel costs in the wake of Hurricanes Katrina and Rita in the autumn of 2005. On July 16, 2006, founder Robert H. Brooks died at age 69.

The airline is estimated to have cost Hooters of America $40 million.

== Destinations ==
During its three-year existence, Hooters Air flew to the following destinations:

=== Bahamas ===
- Nassau – Lynden Pindling International Airport

=== United States ===
- Colorado
  - Denver – Denver International Airport
- Florida
  - Fort Lauderdale – Fort Lauderdale–Hollywood International Airport
  - Fort Myers – Southwest Florida International Airport
  - Orlando – Orlando Sanford International Airport
  - St. Petersburg/Clearwater – St. Pete–Clearwater International Airport
- Georgia
  - Atlanta – Hartsfield–Jackson Atlanta International Airport
- Illinois
  - Rockford – Chicago Rockford International Airport
- Indiana
  - Gary – Gary/Chicago International Airport
- Maryland
  - Baltimore – Baltimore/Washington International Thurgood Marshall Airport
- Nevada
  - Las Vegas – McCarran International Airport
- New Jersey
  - Newark – Newark Liberty International Airport
- Ohio
  - Columbus – Rickenbacker International Airport
- Pennsylvania
  - Allentown – Lehigh Valley International Airport
  - Pittsburgh – Pittsburgh International Airport
  - Wilkes-Barre/Scranton – Wilkes-Barre/Scranton International Airport
- Puerto Rico
  - San Juan – Luis Muñoz Marín International Airport
- South Carolina
  - Myrtle Beach – Myrtle Beach International Airport
- Texas
  - Houston – George Bush Intercontinental Airport

== Fleet ==
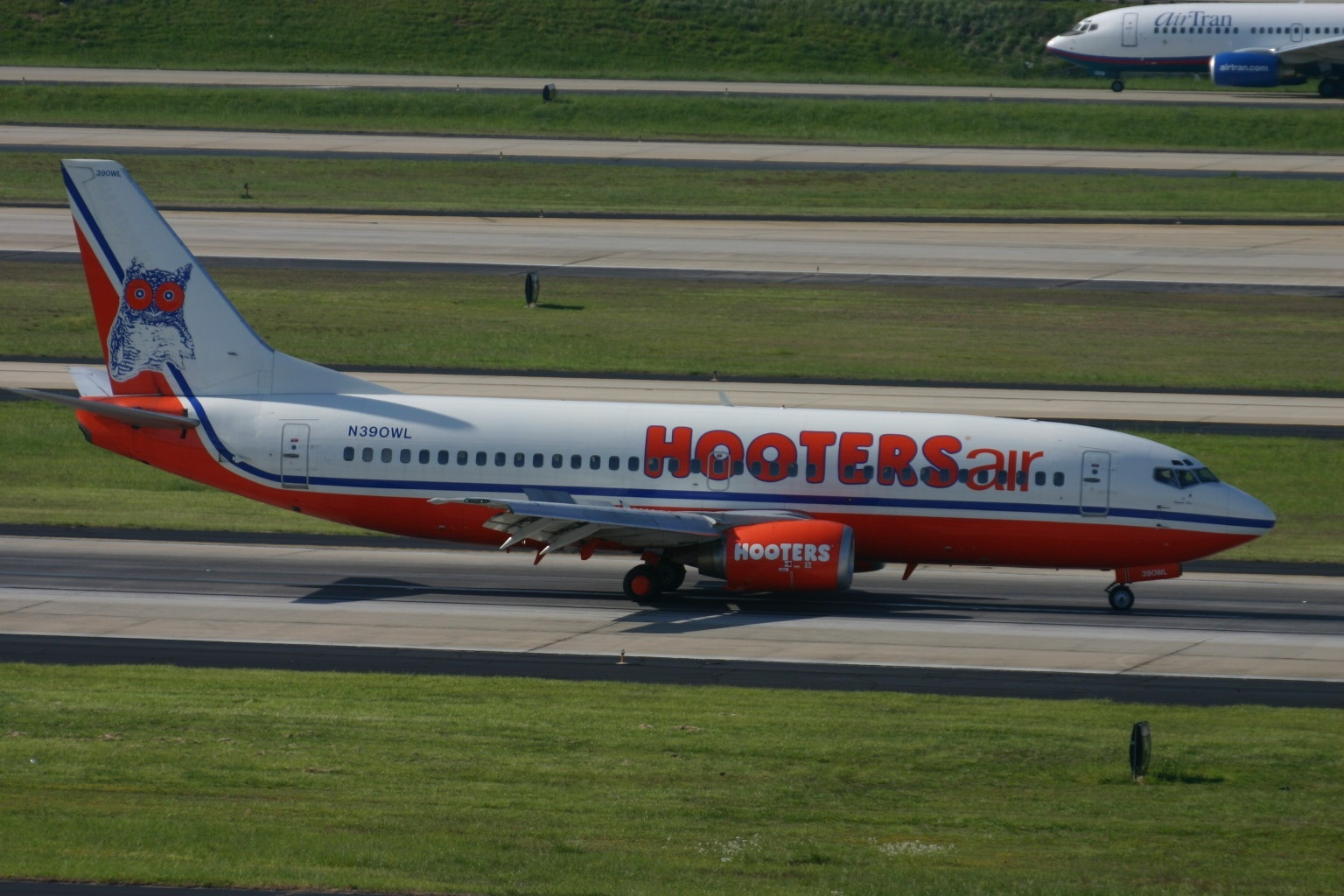
Hooters Air Boeing 737-300

Hooters Air operated the following aircraft:

- 2× Boeing 737-200
- 4× Boeing 737-300
- 1× Boeing 757-200

== See also ==
- List of defunct airlines of the United States
