= Pace Airlines =

American charter airline

IATA	ICAO	Call sign
Y5	PCE	PACE
- Founded: 1996; 30 years ago
- Ceased operations: September 2009; 16 years ago
- Hubs: Smith Reynolds Airport
- Focus cities: Atlantic City International Airport; Dallas Love Field
- Fleet size: 8
- Destinations: 10-14
- Parent company: Pace Airlines, LLC; Pace Airlines II, LLC
- Headquarters: Winston-Salem, North Carolina, US

Pace Airlines was an American charter airline based in Winston-Salem, North Carolina. It operated executive passenger and sports flight charters. Its main base was Smith Reynolds Airport, Winston-Salem.

== History ==
The airline was established in January 1996. The company operated as Piedmont Aviation Svcs d/b/a Pace Airlines, and was granted Federal Aviation Administration and United States Department of Transportation approval on March 26, 1996. Jerry Angel was asked soon after starting operations what the company was named after, he mentioned the name was primarily taken from the name of the inflight magazine of the former Piedmont Airlines (which was merged with USAir in 1989).

The first General Manager of Pace was Jerry Angel, formerly of Piedmont Airlines (1948–1989) and later Leisure Air. The first aircraft on its Air Carrier Certificate was N487GS, a Boeing 737-200 previously of Western Airlines and Viscount, owned by the NBA Charlotte Hornets. The initial business model for the company was as an executive charter service for sports teams, entertainers, and corporations in an all first-class configuration (44 seats). Quickly 3 more aircraft were added to the certificate, N9075U, N159PL, and N37NY.

Piedmont Aviation Services merged with Hawthorne Aviation in July 1998 and became Piedmont Hawthorne Aviation. PHA was owned by the Carlyle Group located in Washington, DC. In January 2000 Mr. Darrell Richardson was recruited as the new President of Pace Airlines. Mr. Richardson had been Chief Operating Officer of Mesaba Airlines since 1995. Immediately, Mr. Richardson began to grow the airline. This saw the first major contract for the company, with Vacation Express out of Atlanta, GA. The agreement called for Pace to operate six Boeing 737-300s on a 'scheduled charter' operation for leisure and vacation travelers. Flights operated out of Baltimore/Washington (BWI), Washington Dulles (IAD), Cincinnati/Northern Kentucky (CVG), Indianapolis (IND), Louisville (SDF), Charlotte/Douglas (CLT) and Atlanta/Hartsfield (ATL) to a hub in Orlando/Sanford (SFB), where they continued on to Saint Marteen (SXM), Punta Cana (PUJ), Cancun (CUN), Liberia Costa Rica (LIR), and Montego Bay (MBJ). These flights operated every day except Tuesday and Wednesday. The first flights for Vacation Express by Pace were launched on Thanksgiving Day, 2001. Pace Airlines, Inc. was sold to Pace Airlines, LLC & Pace Airlines II, LLC in December 2002, which became the parent company of Pace Airlines, Inc.

Additional aircraft were added over time, mainly Boeing 737-200s and a handful of 757-200s. At one time Pace operated 21 aircraft. Contracts came for such city pairs as JFK-POS (752) and MBS-LBX (732). In late December 2002, the owner of Hooters, Robert H. Brooks, agreed to become the owner of Pace Airlines. Hooters Air was born.

== Hooters Air ==
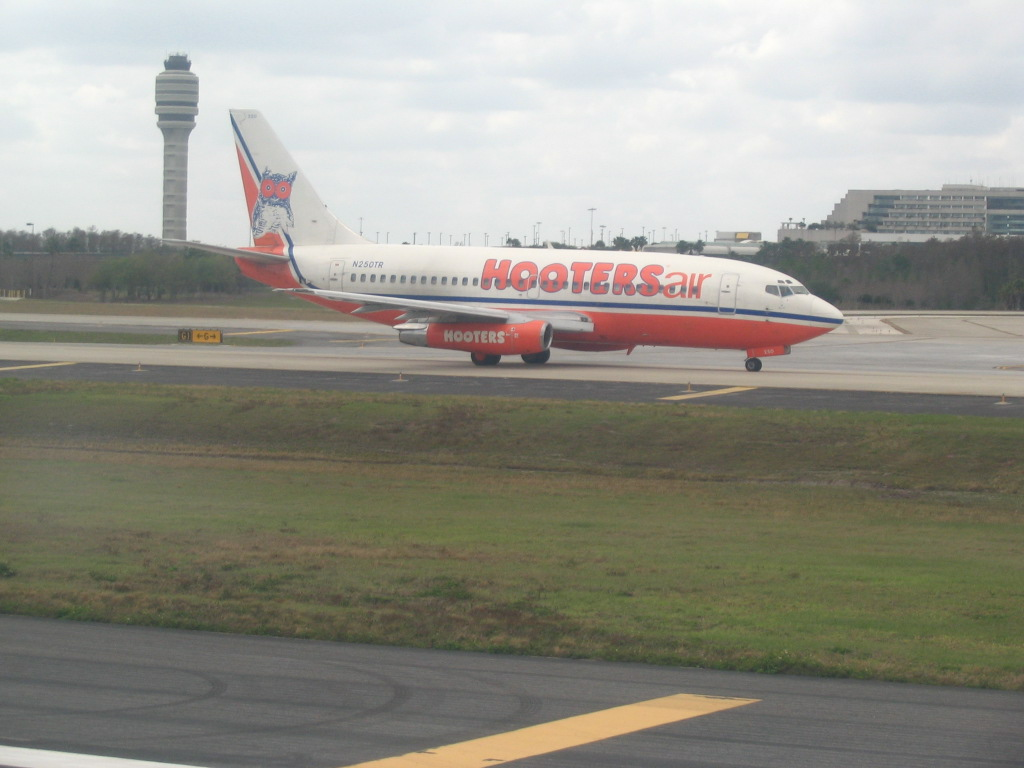
A Hooters Air Boeing 737-200 taxiing at Orlando International Airport, Florida. (2006)

Robert H. Brooks began looking for an airline to buy in 2002. He first approached bankrupt Vanguard Airlines of Kansas City, MO. They rebuffed his offer to buy their assets, so he turned his eye toward Winston-Salem and Pace Airlines. He purchased the company in late December 2002, and began laying the groundwork to bring a new airline to Myrtle Beach, SC. With a former executive of Vanguard, he formed Hooters Air, using the Hooters identity as the draw to attract passengers. Hooters Air offices were headquartered in Myrtle Beach, while the operations/maintenance/flight personnel directly controlled by Pace Airlines remained largely based in Winston-Salem in the former Piedmont/USAirways Tom Davis Training Center.

Hooters Air began service in April 2003 with daily flights between ATL-MYR and BWI-MYR utilizing B737-200s. Gradually EWR, LCK, GYY, PIT, RSW, and NAS (Nassau) were added. Service to Gary, IN (GYY) operated as direct service from MYR with a stopover in Columbus, OH (LCK). Gary was marketed as service to Chicago, as the drive time to downtown Chicago was quicker than from ORD. The aircraft utilized for Hooters were N250TR (B732), N252TR (B732), N371PA (B733), N370WL (B733), N380WL (B733), and N750WL (B752).

In 2003, Vacation Express was acquired by a parent company that at the same time acquired SunTrips, a vacation package operator out of the Bay Area. The fall of 2004 at Pace Airlines was spent preparing the airline for 180 minute ETOPS with the 757-200. Plans were to possibly run vacation charters to Hawaii from the West Coast for the new partner, Suntrips. Proving flights were operated between OAK-HNL. Authorization from the Federal Aviation Administration for 180min ETOPS was granted in late 2004, but this expensive exemption was never utilized, as there were never flights operated between the West Coast and Hawaii for the rest of Pace's existence.

In February 2005, a decision was made to inaugurate Hooters Air service from Rockford, IL (RFD) to Denver (DEN) and Las Vegas (LAS). The flights from RFD were guaranteed to operate at a profit from the local Airport Authority by way of route subsidies. Non-stop service between Myrtle-Las Vegas utilizing the 737-300 was studied several times, but never started. For a period of time in 2005, there were also RFD-ATL nonstop flights. The summer of 2005 saw a huge spike in oil prices, a direct result of speculation in the run-up and aftermath of Hurricanes Katrina and Rita. This upward surge in jet fuel prices, combined with competition from United Airlines (also given subsidies) resulted in the termination of service to Rockford in December 2005.

In August 2005, Hooters Air also began non-stop service between Allentown (ABE) and St Petersburg/Clearwater, FL (PIE), and also Ft. Lauderdale (FLL). These flights only lasted a few months as the carrier ran into difficult times. Mr. Brooks was later sued by two college students who had originally brought the idea of a "Hooters" Airline to him.

== Fleet ==
Pace Airlines flew the following aircraft:

- Boeing 737-200
- Boeing 737-300
- Boeing 737-400
- Boeing 757-200
- Boeing 767-200

== See also ==
- List of defunct airlines of the United States
