= Panamanian Americans =

Americans of Panamanian birth or descent

Total population
- 242,035 (2022)

Regions with significant populations
- New York City; Florida; California; Georgia; Texas

Languages
- American English, Panamanian Spanish, Spanglish

Religion
- Predominantly Roman Catholic; Evangelicalism; Indigenous spiritual beliefs

Related ethnic groups
- Afro-Panamanians, Indigenous peoples of Panama, Latin-Americans, Central Americans, Italian Americans, Portuguese Americans, Spanish-Americans, Chinese Americans, Lebanese Americans, Palestinian Americans, Native Americans

Panamanian Americans (Spanish: Panameño-americano) are Americans of Panamanian descent. Panamanian Americans are the second smallest Central American ethnic group in the United States as of 2010.

Panamanian immigration to the United States is intertwined with the complex diplomatic relationship between the two nations, which formally began in 1903 following Panama's separation from Colombia. Early migration patterns were significantly influenced by the construction and operation of the Panama Canal.

The Panamanian-American population in the United States grew significantly from 100,000 in 2000 to 240,000 in 2021, representing a 134% increase over two decades. Many Panamanian-Americans reside near army-based cities. Panamanian Americans are primarily concentrated in five states including Florida, New York, California, Texas, and Georgia.

== History ==
=== Before the 20th century ===
Panamanians settled in the United States before the 19th century, however they were not required to be recorded in immigration records. U.S. Immigration officials did not differentiate between Latin American immigrants at the time. Early migration patterns show just 44 Panamanians recorded in the United States in the 1830s.

=== 1900s—present ===
Immigration gradually increased, reaching over 1,000 annual arrivals by the early 1900s, though these numbers declined following World War I.

The 1940 Census recorded 7,000 Americans of Central American descent, with several hundred likely being Panamanian or of Colombian heritage from areas that later formed the Republic of Panama. After World War II, immigration from Panama to the United States increased significantly, with the Census Bureau noting in 1960 that Panamanians were among the largest Central American groups in the nation.

From 1962 onward, domestic service remained a significant occupation among Panamanian immigrants, comprising 15–28% of employed newcomers. The 1968 immigration preference system, which prioritized family reunification, facilitated increased immigration of homemakers and children. By 1970, Central Americans in the U.S. had grown to 174,000, with Panamanians emerging as one of the largest Central American immigrant groups. Substantial Panamanian immigration occurred after the 1965 Immigration Act, which paradoxically imposed a 120,000-person limit on Western Hemisphere admissions.

Approximately twice as many women as men immigrated to the United States, with many women finding employment in housekeeping, service industries, or as low-level white-collar workers, while sending remittances back to their families. As of 2013, about 20% of Panamanian migrants were employed in the domestic sector. Foreign-born Panamanian-American adults show a higher marriage rate of 46%, while their U.S.-born counterparts have a lower rate of 37%.

By 1990, the Panamanian-American population had reached approximately 86,000 people.

Panamanian Americans were the second smallest Central American ethnic group in the United States as of the 2010 Census. The Panamanian-American population in the United States grew significantly from 100,000 in 2000 to 240,000 in 2021, representing a 134% increase over two decades. As of 2021, Panamanian Americans are primarily concentrated in five states including Florida (17%), New York (17%), California (10%), Texas (9%), and Georgia (8%).

As of 2021, the median annual personal earnings for Panamanian Americans aged 16 and above reached $36,000. For full-time workers, Panamanian Americans reported median earnings of $50,000. Foreign-born Panamanian Americans represent 36% of their community, with most having established long-term residence and citizenship in the United States. Panamanian Americans hold bachelor's degrees at nearly double the rate of the general Hispanic American population, and U.S.-born Panamanians show especially high rates of college completion. In the same year, 118,301 Panamanian Americans were born in the United States (including Zonians), while 61,824 gained citizenship through naturalization, and 21,827 remained non-citizens. The 2022 US Census Bureau demographic data reported that over half of Panamanian Americans identified with a single race, while 42.7% reported multiracial heritage.

=== Migration to New York City ===
A mass migration of Afro-Caribbean Panamanians to New York City began in the 1940s due to Panama's 1941 Constitution. Immigration patterns show that over 10,000 non-US citizens departed from Panama for the United States between 1946 and 1949. This constitution denationalized individuals with foreign-born parents from "prohibited races," which significantly impacted the Afro-Caribbean Panamanian community.

Though Harlem was the initial home for many Panamanian immigrants, the expansion of subway lines connecting Manhattan to Brooklyn in the late 1930s led more Afro-Caribbean Panamanians to settle in Brooklyn during the 1940s. Brooklyn's residential patterns were characterized by racial segregation, with North and Central Brooklyn areas designated for non-white residents. These residential restrictions reflected similar segregation practices implemented in both the Canal Zone and Panama. These communities maintained Panamanian cultural traditions while integrating into New York City culture. Many participated in both Spanish and English-speaking social spheres, where they formed connections with broader Black diaspora communities throughout the borough.

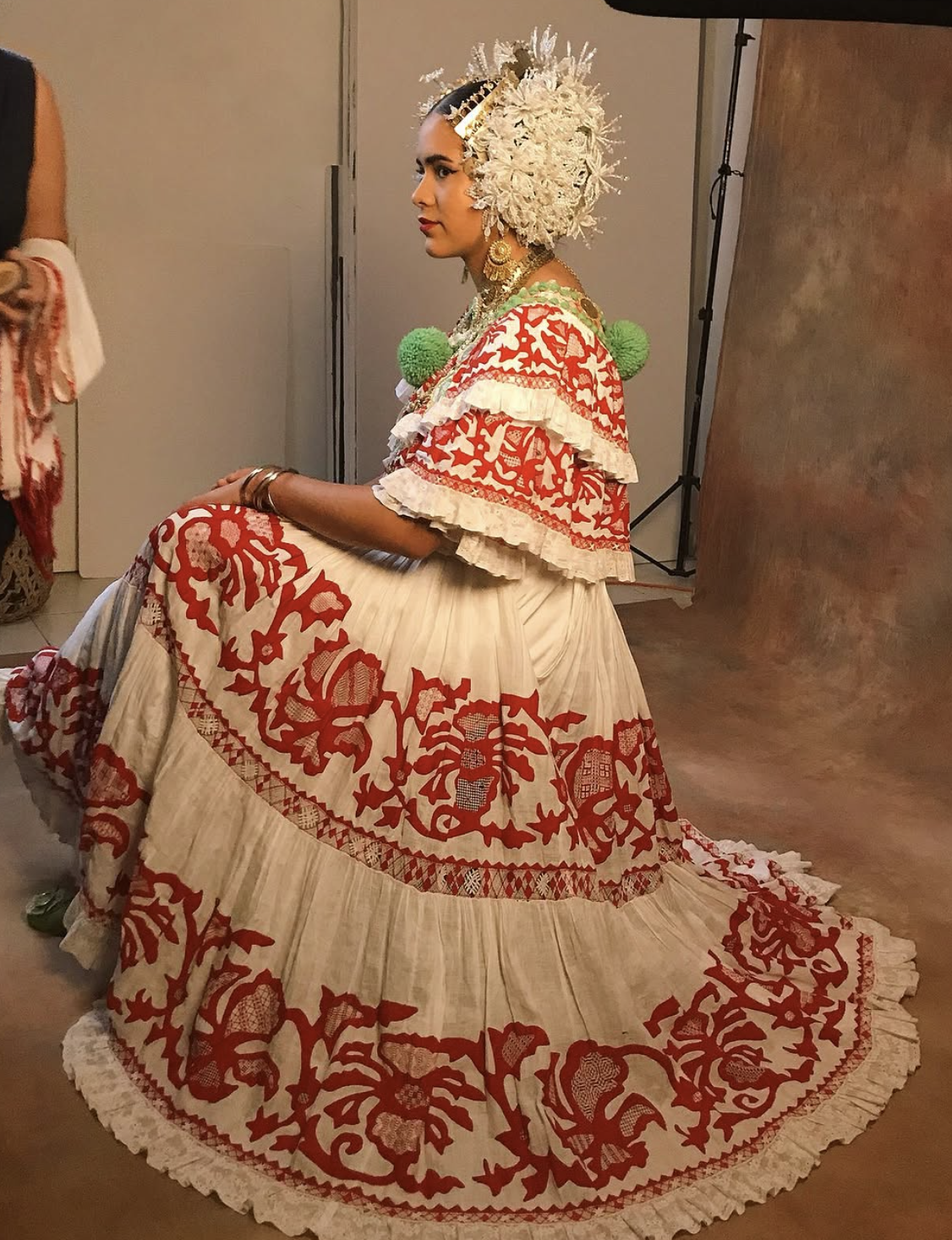
A Panamanian-American person wearing a Pollera de Gala with tembleques in their hair from Panama, a traditional folkloric dress

Las Servidoras was a scholarship-granting organization founded by Afro-Panamanian women in Brooklyn, New York in the early 1950s. On April 20, 1963, on the tenth anniversary of the organization's founding, all of its members became lifelong NAACP members. The organization Las Servidoras promoted a broader concept of Panamanian identity (ser panameño) that included communities living outside Panama's borders, expanding the traditional nation-based definition of citizenship.

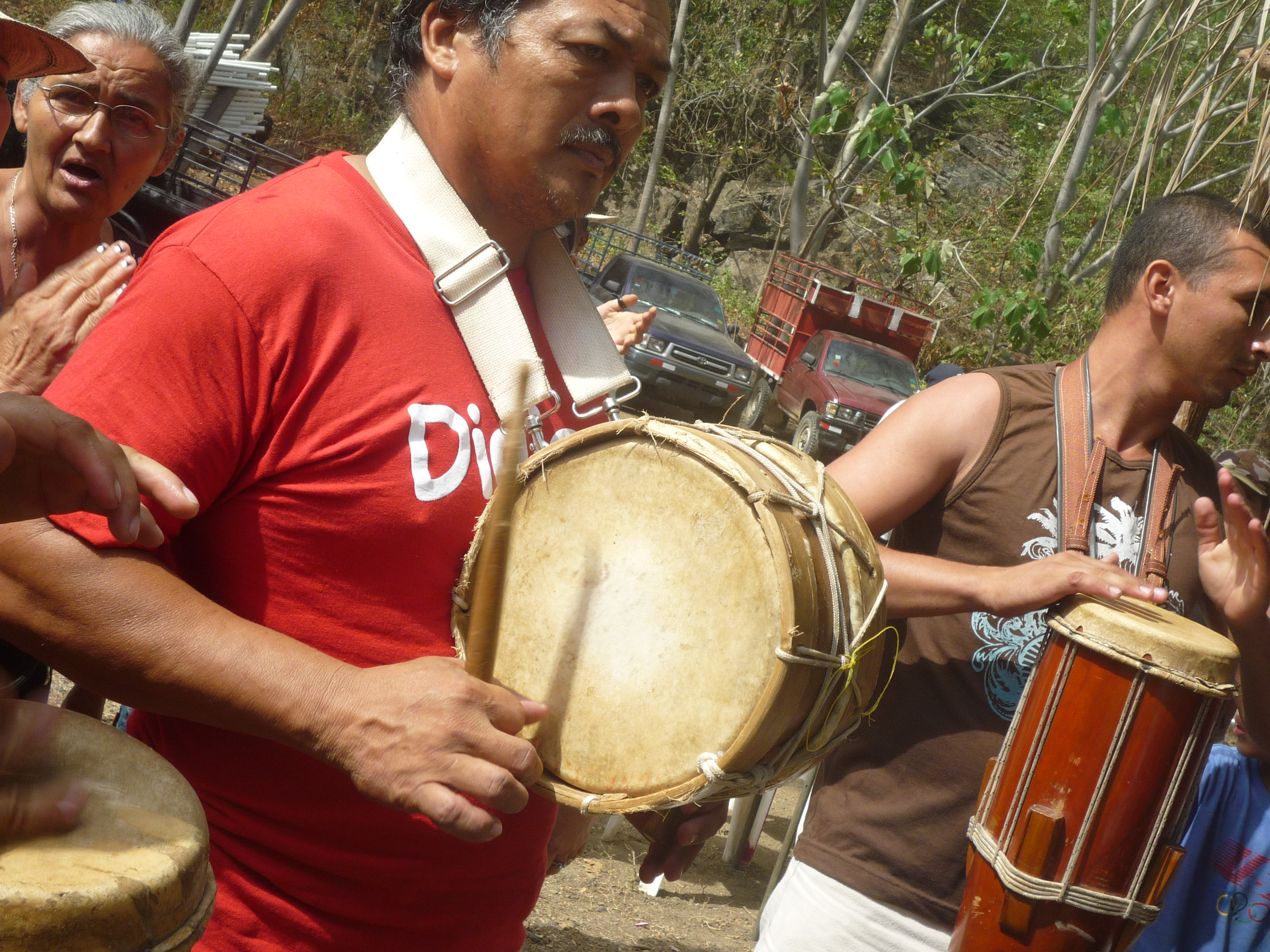
A group of Indigenous men playing Tamborito

A 1952 Amsterdam News article documented the cultural practices of Brooklyn's Afro-Caribbean Panamanian community through its coverage of a birthday celebration. The event featured traditional elements such as tamborito dances and folkloric attire, illustrating how the community preserved Panamanian customs in their new urban setting.

By 1970, New York was home to 17,000 Panamanians of mostly Mestizo, Black, and Indigenous descent.

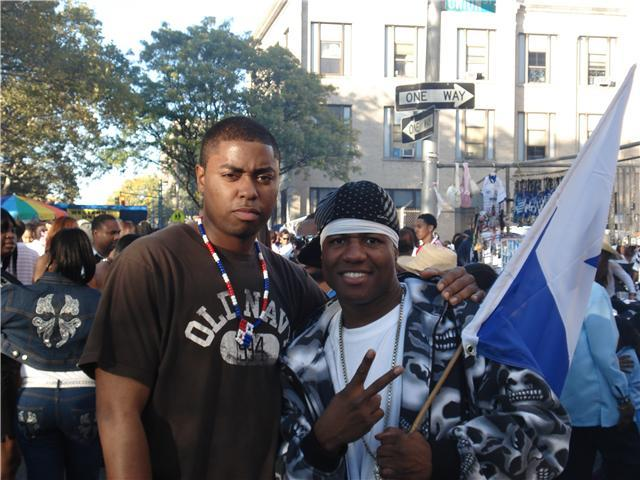
DJ Black and Cesar Moreno at The Panamanian Day Parade in Brooklyn

Panamanian Americans made significant contributions to the development of reggaeton music, particularly through their work in New York during the late 1980s and early 1990s. While the initial reggae en Español movement originated in Panama, the Panamanian-American music scene in New York played a crucial role in transforming it into early reggaeton through the incorporation of urban American music styles. This fusion occurred primarily through production work in New York studios, where Panamanian-American producers and artists combined Caribbean rhythms with elements of hip-hop and house music, creating a distinctive sound that would later influence reggaeton's development in Puerto Rico and other regions.

=== Florida ===
From 1904, the Panama Canal Zone fostered a distinct American community known as "Zonians", who enjoyed U.S.-style amenities and infrastructure. The Zone maintained a rigid social system dividing white "gold roll" workers from West Indian "silver roll" laborers, who faced discrimination and hazardous work conditions. After the Zone's closure in 1979, former residents continued their community connections through yearly gatherings in Tampa, Florida.

The Panamanian American Chamber of Commerce was established in Miami during the 1990s to support Panamanian exiles who fled to South Florida during the Noriega dictatorship.

As of 2010, there were 17,301 Panamanians living in Florida, with Miami hosting 13,529 and Tampa with 3,772. This is due to MacDill Air Force Base in Tampa, Florida.

=== Georgia ===
The Panamanian-American dance troupe named Orgullo Panameño from Hinesville, Georgia performed at the Fiesta Latina festival on River Street in Savannah, Georgia in 2013. They performed dressed in polleras and diablicos sucios.

=== California ===
In 1970, there were a little less than 600 Panamanian Americans in San Francisco, California.

== Language ==
As of 2021, Panamanian Americans demonstrate higher rates of English language proficiency compared to the broader Hispanic population in the United States. Among Panamanian-Americans aged 5 and older, 87% either exclusively use English at home or speak it "very well," while this figure stands at 72% for the general Hispanic population. Similarly, adult Panamanians show elevated levels of English proficiency at 85%, exceeding the 67% rate observed among the overall Hispanic adult population.

== Notable figures ==
=== Musicians ===
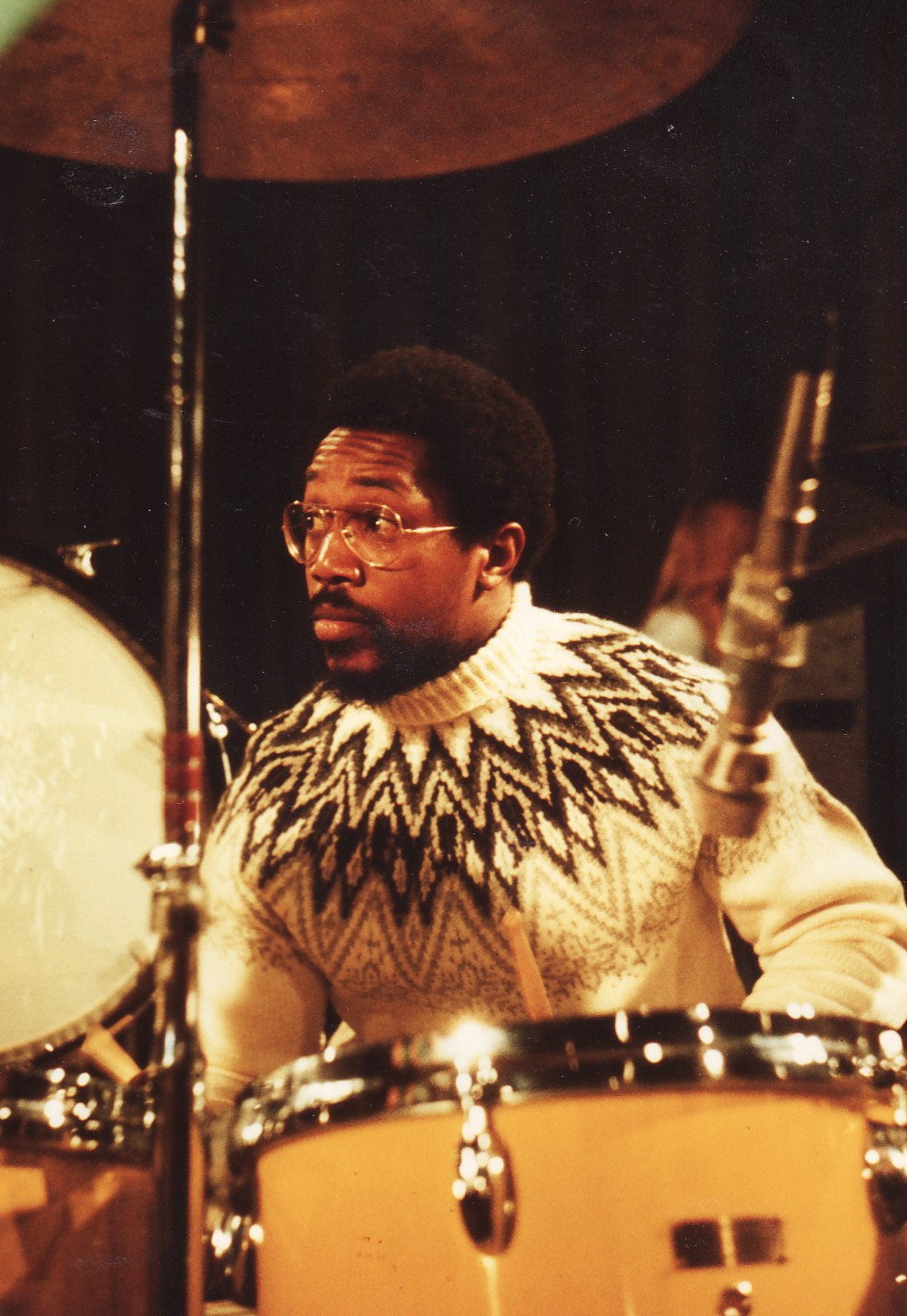
Billy Cobham at soundcheck for the Kongsberg Jazz Festival in 1974

Billy Cobham, born in 1944, is a Panamanian-American drummer, composer, and bandleader who played a pivotal role in developing jazz fusion music. His 1973 debut solo album "Spectrum" became a landmark recording in the genre, blending rock instrumentation with jazz complexity. Cobham is known for his drumming technique, including the use of two drumsticks in each hand, and has collaborated with notable artists including Miles Davis, John McLaughlin in the Mahavishnu Orchestra, Carlos Santana, and the Grateful Dead.

Rubén Blades was born in Panamá, and moved to New York City in 1974. He is a songwriter, actor, lawyer, and politician, best known for being a salsa singer and composer. Pedro Navaja As a songwriter, Blades brought the lyrical sophistication of Central American nueva canción and Cuban nueva trova as well as experimental tempos and politically inspired Son Cubano salsa to his music, creating "thinking persons' (salsa) dance music". Blades has written dozens of hit songs, including "Pedro Navaja" and "El Cantante". He has received 21 Grammy Award nominations, winning twelve of them, along with twelve Latin Grammy Awards.

Nancy Ames is a Panamanian-American folk singer and songwriter known for her guitar performances and Spanish-language songs. She is the granddaughter of a Panamanian president, Ricardo Joaquín Alfaro. She gained attention in the 1960s for her musical performances incorporating romantic Latin American themes.

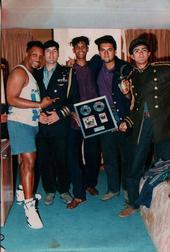
Picture of Producer Michael Ellis (founder of Reggaeton), and El General (Godfather of Reggaeton, after winning La Gaviota de Plata at the Festival de la Canción de Viña del Mar, Chile

Jeff Buckley was an American singer-songwriter born to Mary Guibert, a classically trained pianist and daughter of Panamanian American Zonian immigrants to Anaheim, California, and Tim Buckley, a folk singer.

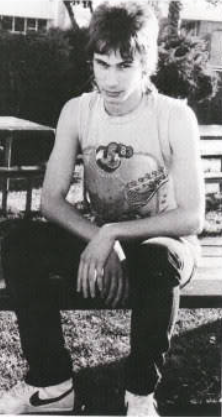
Jeff Buckley in 1984

Singer and rapper Aloe Blacc is Panamanian-American.

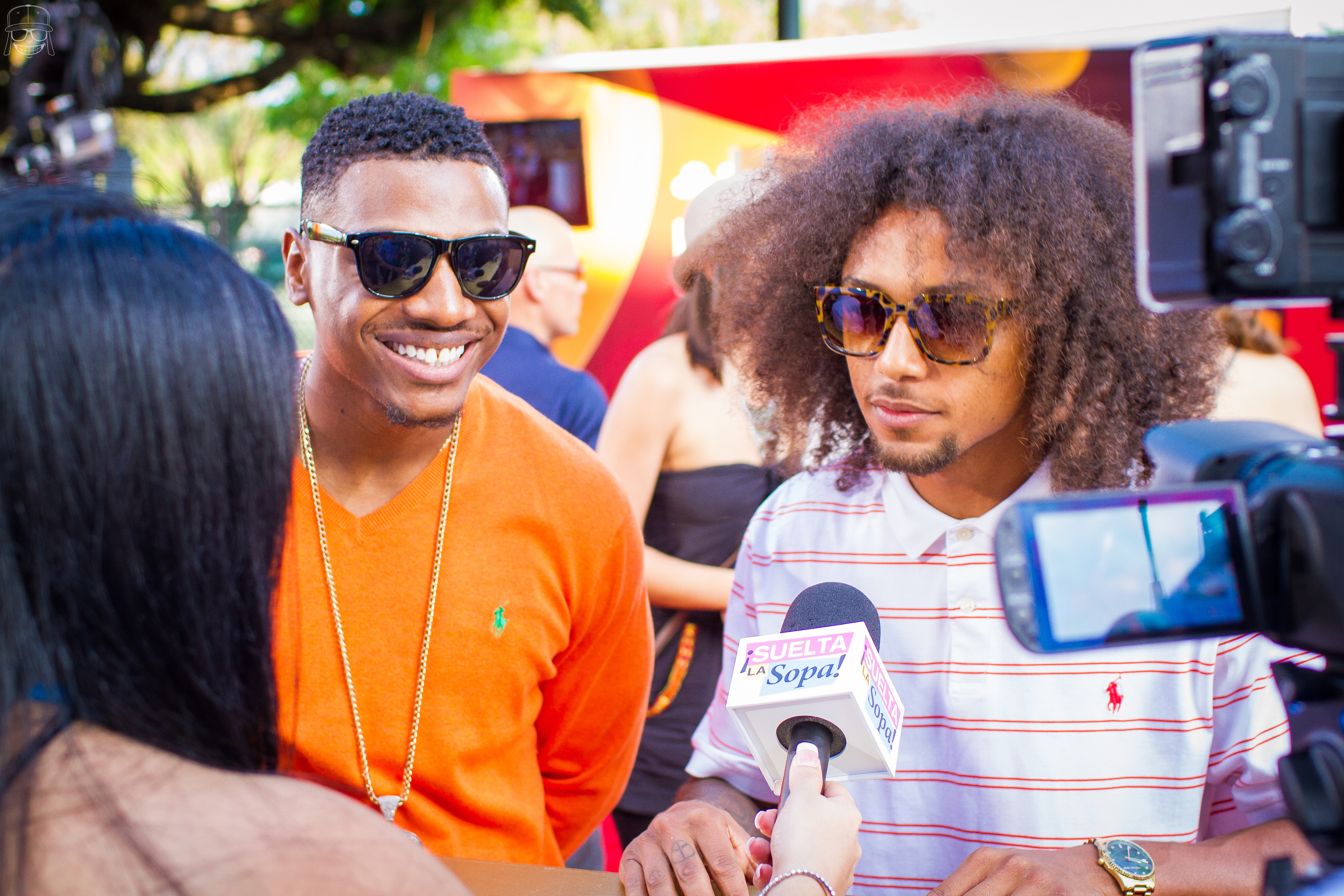
Los Rakas giving an interview

Making Movies is a Kansas City-based band formed by two sets of brothers; Panamanian-American siblings Enrique Chi (guitar) and Diego Chi (bass), alongside Mexican-American brothers Andres Chaurand (drums) and Juan-Carlos Chaurand (percussion/keyboards). The band's personal experiences inform their work. Due to changes in U.S. immigration law, Enrique and Diego Chi held different citizenship statuses despite being born to the same American citizen father. They have collaborated with the Panamanian singer, actor and activist Rubén Blades.

Los Rakas are a Panamanian-American hip-hop duo.

Pop Smoke, born Bashar Jackson, was an influential American rapper of Panamanian and Jamaican descent who emerged from Brooklyn's drill rap scene. His stage name combined two childhood nicknames: "Papa," given by his Panamanian grandmother, and "Smoke," bestowed by friends. Raised in Canarsie, Brooklyn, in a middle-class duplex, he represented a significant breakthrough in New York's hip-hop landscape. His musical career, though brief, was marked by rapid success. His signature style featured a distinctive gravel-voiced delivery reminiscent of 1990s New York rap. His debut album "Meet the Woo" (2019) established him in the hip-hop community, leading to collaborations with prominent artists including Nicki Minaj, Travis Scott, and Quavo. His second album achieved notable commercial success, reaching No. 7 on the Billboard 200 chart. Pop Smoke's life was tragically cut short at age 20 during a home invasion in Los Angeles in February 2020.

José James is of Irish and Panamanian descent, born in Minneapolis, Minnesota. DJ Clue is a Panamanian-American DJ, record producer, radio personality and record executive

=== Actors ===
Tatyana Ali, known for her acting role as Ashley Banks in The Fresh Prince of Bel-Air, is a Panamanian-American actress, model, and R&B singer. She is Afro-Panamanian and Indo-Trinidadian.

Alexandra Metz is an American actress of Panamanian, Colombian and Caribbean descent, known for her role as Dr Yolanda Garcia on The Pitt.

Tessa Thompson is a Panamanian American and Mexican-American actress. She is Panamanian through her Afro-Panamanian father, who worked as an R&B and folk musician under the stage name Chocolate Genius, Inc. Her early exposure to the arts came through her father, who took her to the movie theater to see Amelie, which was a pivotal moment that inspired her acting career. Thompson's mixed cultural background has influenced her career choices and advocacy for diverse representation in media, particularly in genres like science fiction and fantasy, in movies such as Thor: Ragnarok, where such representation has historically been limited.

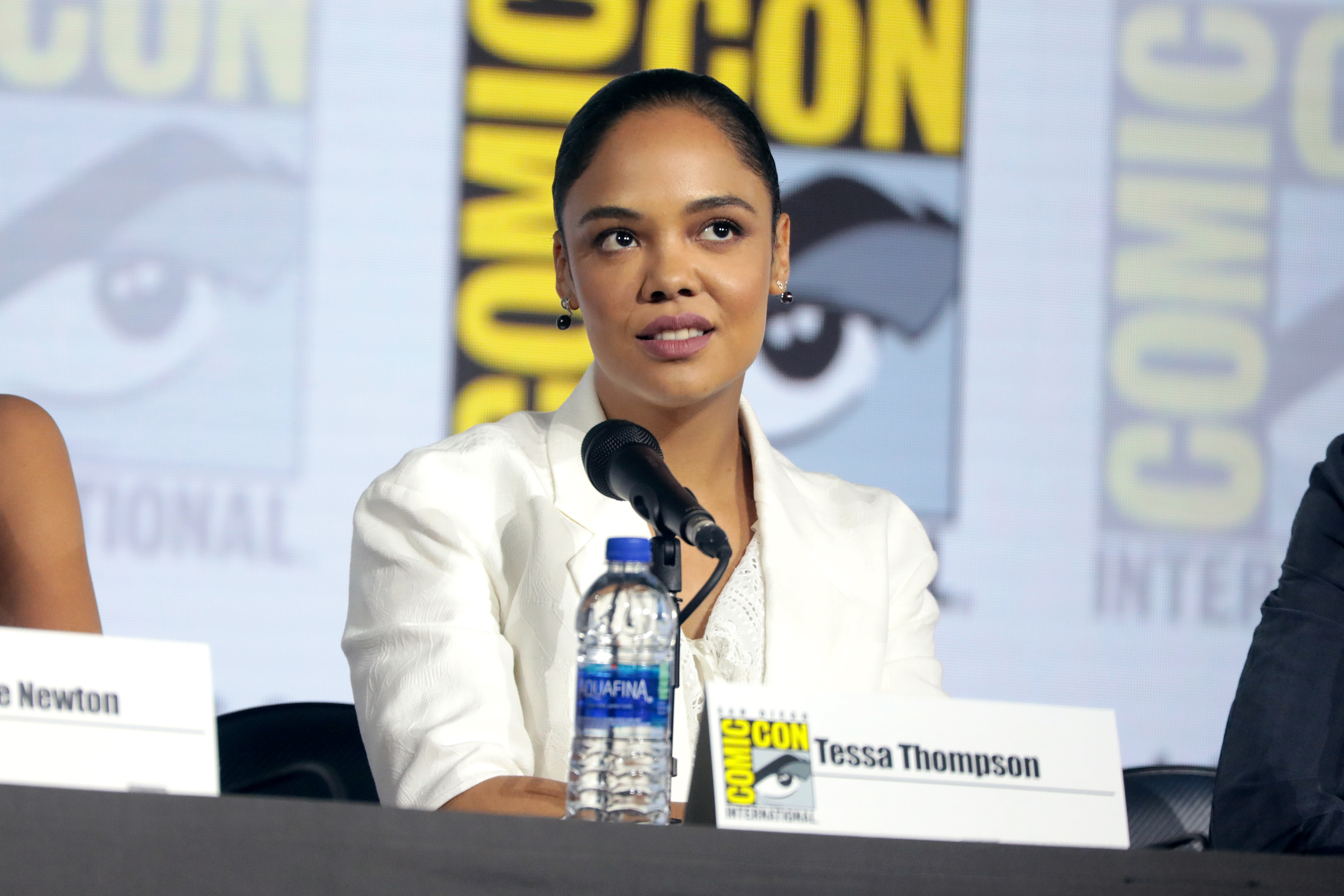
Tessa Thompson at the 2019 San Diego Comic-Con

Sarunas Jackson's, a Panamanian-American actor, role as Dro on the television series Insecure initially called for a Black Mexican character. However, Jackson advocated for changing the character's background to Afro-Latino of Panamanian descent. This change represented a significant milestone in the representation of Afro-Latino identities in U.S. mainstream media.

J. August Richards is a Panmanian-American actor known for his portrayal of vampire hunter Charles Gunn on the WB cult television series Angel.

=== Writers ===
Quibián Salazar-Moreno, a Panamanian-American writer named after a 16th-century chief who resisted Columbus, immigrated to Denver as a child and navigated multiple cultural transitions including his mother's death, his grandmother's arrival from Panama, and his father's remarriage to an Italian-American. Now living in Los Angeles, he maintains ties to his Panamanian heritage while raising his children to embrace their multicultural Afro-Latina background.

=== Visual Artists ===
Panamanian-American Debi Hasky is a visual artist that spotlights daily street harassment faced by women.

Sabrina Shumaker is a Panamanian American visual artist based in Central Florida. Born in Texas, she works across multiple mediums including sculpture, oil painting, and illustration, with a particular focus on murals. One of her well-known works is "Night Owl," a 15-foot-tall mural located on Burton's Thornton Park in Downtown Orlando, Florida.

=== Fashion ===
Liliana Damaris Pope is a Panamanian American apparel and accessories designer based in Austin, Texas. She is known for discussing her Afro-Latina identity on social media, inspired by a Google Doodle featuring Ildaura Murillo-Rohde who founded the National Association of Hispanic Nurses.

Tyson Beckford is a model and actor of Chinese, Afro-Jamaican, and Afro-Panamanian descent. He is from New York City but lived in Jamaica for several years.

=== Medicine ===
Ildaura Murillo-Rohde

Dr. Victor Ricardo Alfaro was a Panamanian-American otolaryngologist who served as professor emeritus at Georgetown University School of Medicine and senior attending otolaryngologist at the Washington Hospital Center. He is the son to the former Panamanian president Ricardo Joaquín Alfaro, and he immigrated to the United States in 1922. After receiving his medical degree from Georgetown University in 1929, he served as a lieutenant colonel in the Army Medical Corps during World War II. He was a director of the Deafness Research Foundation. He was the father of Nancy Ames.

Ildaura Murillo-Rohde was a Panamanian-American nurse and educator who recognized a need for Latino representation in healthcare after moving from Panama to San Antonio, Texas in her twenties. After earning her doctorate from New York University in 1971, she founded the National Association of Hispanic Nurses (NAHN) in 1975. She served as its first president while working as a psychiatric nurse, professor, and dean to promote cultural awareness in healthcare. Her contributions to nursing and healthcare earned her a fellowship from the American Academy of Nursing.

=== Political activists and politicians ===
Dr. Carlos Russell was a Panamanian-American scholar, activist, and diplomat, founded Black Solidarity Day in 1969 as an annual November 3 observance to unite African descendants across the Americas against racial oppression. He was an Afro-Latino intellectual and one of Malcolm X's early interviewers following his Mecca pilgrimage. His pioneering work in Pan-Africanism emphasized the interconnected nature of Black liberation struggles throughout the Americas, leaving a lasting impact on modern social justice movements before his passing in 2018.

Byron Donalds is a Panamanian-American U.S. representative from Florida.

=== Sports ===
Rolando Blackman is a Panamanian-American basketball player who went to Grady Vocational High School in Coney Island, Brooklyn. Blackman played with the Dallas Mavericks in the National Basketball Association (NBA) and was named an NBA All-Star four times. He was the first Panamanian-born player in the NBA and never fouled out in his 865 games as a Maverick.

Logan Allen and Enrique Bradfield were Panamanian-American baseball players. Uri Berenguer was a play-by-play announcer for the Boston Red Sox Spanish Beisbol Network

Braulio Baeza was a Panamanian-American Thoroughbred horse racing Hall of Fame jockey.

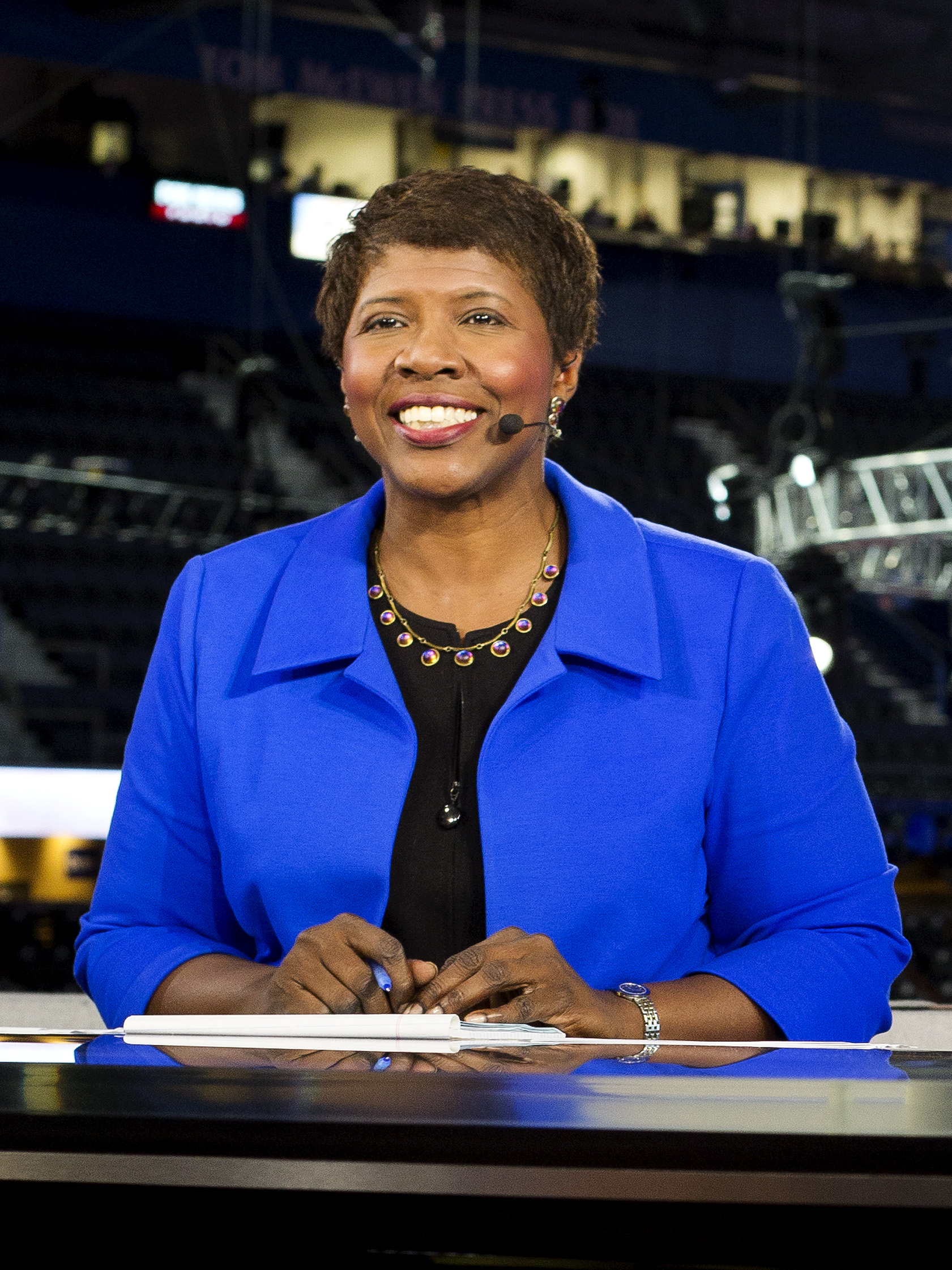
Gwen Ifill on PBS NewsHour

Demitrius Omphroy is a soccer player of Panamanian and Filipino descent.

=== Academia and journalism ===
Linda Martín Alcoff is a Panamanian-American philosopher of Panamanian and Irish descent who is a college professor at Hunter College, New York.

Gwen Ifill is a Panamanian-American journalist, newscaster, and author. Her father was Panamanian of Barbadian descent. She was the co-anchor and co-managing editor of the PBS NewsHour and moderated the 2004 and 2008 U.S. Vice Presidential debates.

Juan Williams is a Panamanian-American journalist and political analyst. He has written for the Washington Post, NPR and Fox News.

=== Businesspeople ===
Angela Spring, a Panamanian and Puerto Rican American entrepreneur, founded Duende District, a pop-up bookstore business in Washington, D.C. that operates through multiple locations and focuses on serving communities of color through curated literature and cultural programming.

A. R. Bernard is the founder, Senior Pastor and CEO of Christian Cultural Center (CCC), in Brooklyn, New York. He was born in Panama and emigrated to New York City.

== See also ==
- Afro-Panamanians
- Hispanic and Latino Americans
- History of Hispanic and Latino Americans in the United States
- Latin America–United States relations
- Panama–United States relations
