= Hooters =

American restaurant chain

Hooters, Inc.
- Type: Private
- Industry: Food service
- Founded: October 4, 1983; 43 years ago Clearwater, Florida, U.S.
- Founders: Lynn D. Stewart; Gil DiGiannantonio; Ed Droste; Billy Ranieri; Ken Wimmer; Dennis Johnson
- Headquarters: Clearwater, Florida, U.S.
- Number of locations: U.S.: 198; International: 60
- Area served: Aruba; Australia; Bahamas; Canada; China; Colombia; Costa Rica; Czech Republic; Dominican Republic; Germany; Guatemala; Hungary; Indonesia; Japan; Mexico; Panama; Philippines; Singapore; South Africa; South Korea; Switzerland; Taiwan; Thailand; U. S. Virgin Islands; United Kingdom; United States
- Products: Burgers, chicken wings, seafood, Tex-Mex, full bar
- Revenue: ▲US$605 million (2021)
- Number of employees: 15,000 (2021)
- Website: hooters.com

Hooters is the registered trademark used by an international restaurant chain Hooters, Inc., based in Clearwater, Florida and its associated franchise group Hoot Owl Restaurants LLC. The Hooters name is a double entendre referring to both an American slang term for women's breasts and the logo (a bird known for its "hooting" calls: the owl).

The waiting staff at Hooters restaurants are primarily young women, usually referred to simply as "Hooters Girls", whose revealing outfits and sex appeal are played up and are a primary component of the company's image. The company employs both men and women as cooks, hosts (at some franchises), busboys, and managers. The menu includes hamburgers and other sandwiches, steaks, seafood entrees, appetizers, and the restaurant's specialty, chicken wings. Almost all Hooters restaurants hold alcoholic beverage licenses to sell beer and wine, and where local permits allow, a full liquor bar. Hooters T-shirts, sweatshirts, and various souvenirs and curios are also sold.

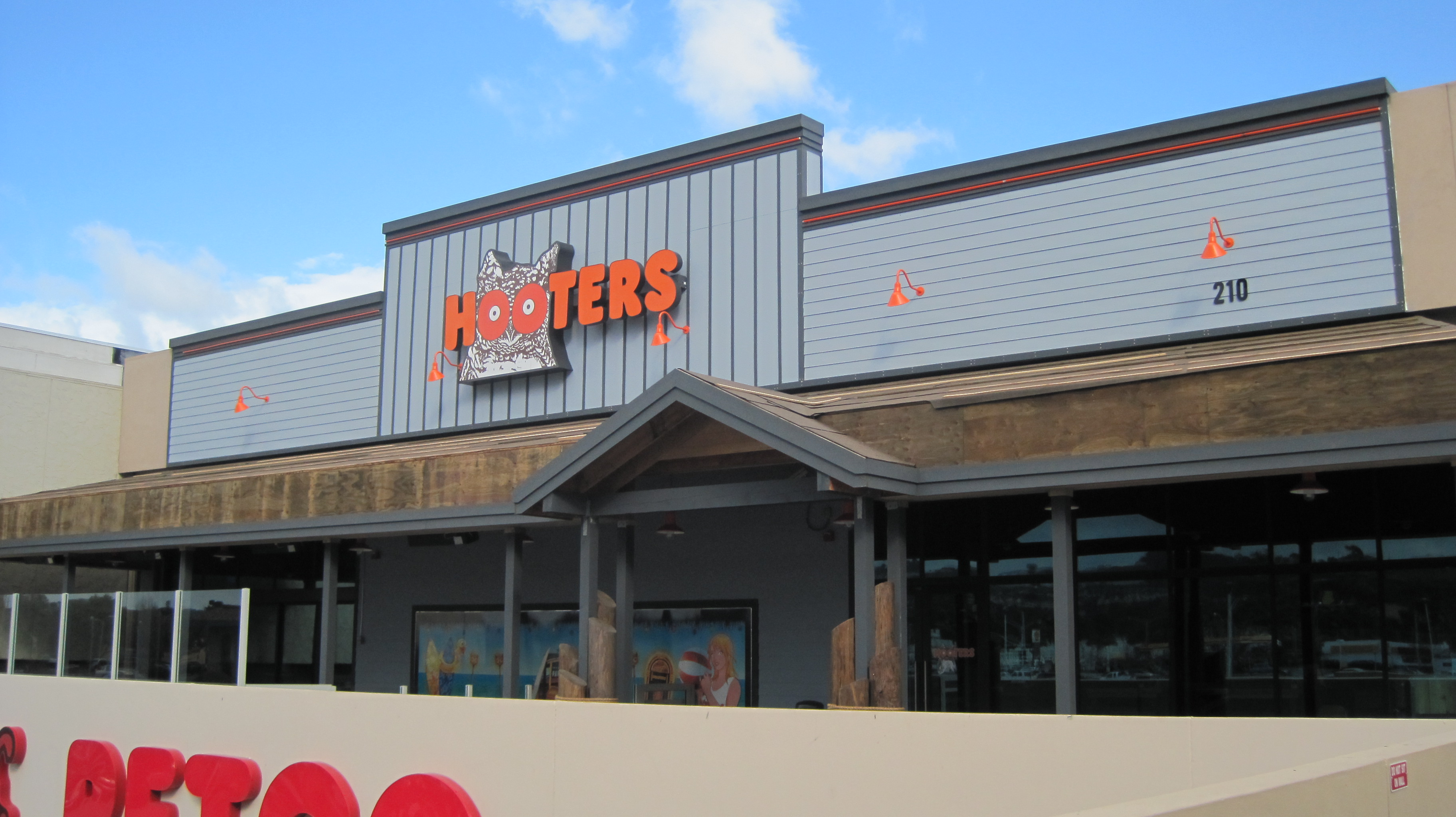
Exterior of Hooters in San Bruno, California

As of 2016, there were more than 430 Hooters locations and franchises around the world, and Hooters of America LLC owns 160 units. In 2012, there were Hooters locations in 44 US states, the United States Virgin Islands, Guam, and 28 other countries. Hooters also had an airline, Hooters Air, with a normal flight crew and flight attendants and scantily clad "Hooters Girls" on every flight.

On March 31, 2025, Hooters of America, Inc. announced that it had filed for Chapter 11 bankruptcy protection.

== History ==
2013–2021 Hooters logo

Hooters, Inc., was incorporated in Clearwater, Florida, on April 1, 1983, by six Clearwater businessmen: Lynn D. Stewart, Gil DiGiannantonio, Ed Droste, Billy Ranieri, Ken Wimmer and Dennis Johnson. The date was an April Fools' Day joke because the original six owners believed that their prospect was going to fail. Their first Hooters restaurant was built on the site of a former rundown nightclub that had been purchased at a low price. So many businesses had folded in that particular location that the Hooters founders built a small "graveyard" at the front door for each that had come and gone before them. The first restaurant opened its doors on October 4, 1983, in Clearwater. This original location was decorated with memorabilia from Waverly, Iowa, hometown to some of the original Hooters 6.

In December 1984, Hugh Connerty bought the rights to Hooters from the Original Hooters 6. Robert H. Brooks and a group of Atlanta investors (operators of Hooters of America, Inc.) bought out Hugh Connerty. In 2002, Brooks bought majority control and became chairman. The Clearwater-based company retained control over restaurants in the Tampa Bay Area, Chicago metropolitan area, and one in Manhattan, as well as rights to develop a Hooters casino and sell sauces in grocery stores, while all other locations were under the aegis of Hooters of America, which sold franchising rights to the rest of the United States and international locations. Under Brooks's leadership, the collective Hooters brand expanded to more than 425 stores worldwide. Brooks died on July 15, 2006, in Myrtle Beach, South Carolina, of a heart attack. Brooks's will gave most of Hooters of America Inc. to his son Coby Brooks and daughter Boni Belle Brooks.

The Hooters Casino Hotel was opened February 2, 2006, off the Las Vegas Strip in Paradise, Nevada, adjacent to the Tropicana, across the street from the MGM Grand Las Vegas. It became the Oyo Hotel & Casino in 2019, and the restaurant on property closed in 2025.

As part of their 25th anniversary, Hooters Magazine released its list of top Hooters Girls of all time. Among the best-known were Lynne Austin, who was the Playmate of the Month for July 1986 (the original Hooters Girl), the late Kelly Jo Dowd (the mother of the golfer Dakoda Dowd), Bonnie-Jill Laflin, Leeann Tweeden, and Holly Madison.

After Brooks's death in 2006, 240 buyers showed interest in Hooters of America Inc., and 17 submitted bids, with that number being reduced to eight, and then three, before the selection of Wellspring Capital Management. Chanticleer Holdings LLC of Charlotte, North Carolina, which had the right to block the sale after a $5 million loan made in 2006, did so in a December 1, 2010, letter to the court. As a result, Chanticleer and other investors bought the company from the Brooks family. They completed the purchase in January 2011.

As of July 2013, Hooters of America owned 160 restaurants and operates or franchises over 430.

On July 1, 2019, Hooters of America was sold to Nord Bay Capital and TriArtisan Capital Advisors.

=== 2025 bankruptcy ===
In June 2024, Hooters of America abruptly closed approximately 40 locations that were deemed underperforming, blaming rising costs and a decline in sales as part of the decision. On February 21, 2025, it was reported that Hooters of America was preparing to file for Chapter 11 bankruptcy protection within the coming months after prior closures in 2024 and revenue losses at its locations. On March 31, 2025, Hooters of America filed for Chapter 11 bankruptcy protection in an effort to move forward with a sale to franchisees that consists of all of its company-owned restaurants. The company initially had no plans to close restaurants and would remain operational during the procedure. At the time of the bankruptcy, there were 305 Hooters restaurants globally, including 151 restaurants operated by Hooters of America. However, by June 4, 2025, over 30 locations in 12 states permanently closed. Per-store sales at Hooters of America-owned restaurants were less than half those operated by the Clearwater-based company. Overall sales at Hooters of America shrank from $1.2 billion in 2009 to $678 million in 2024.

Real American Beer co-founder Hulk Hogan expressed interest in the company acquiring Hooters out of bankruptcy prior to his death in July 2025.

The Clearwater-based company, along with a group of other franchisees, purchased the Atlanta-based company out of bankruptcy in October 2025. The founders, who still operate the Clearwater-based company and its 22 restaurants, plan to "de-sexualize" the image of Hooters by making attire slightly more modest, ending bikini nights, and returning to its family friendlier roots, while also improving the food quality and reinvesting into the restaurants.

On February 16, 2026, the last Hooters restaurant on Long Island, New York located in Farmingdale closed. On March 22, 2026, the Hooters at Mall of America closed after being at the mall for 33 years.

As of August, 2026, the company has indefinitely closed all remaining locations in four states: New York, Massachusetts, Connecticut, and Minnesota. There was no prior notice to the public, and no other details other than a piece of paper taped to the inside of the door, reading:

After much deliberation, we've made the difficult decision to close this location. We are incredibly grateful for the many years of great times, cold beer, hot wings, and unforgettable memories shared here. Thank you to our guests, team members, and community for the support over the years.

=== Hoots spinoff ===
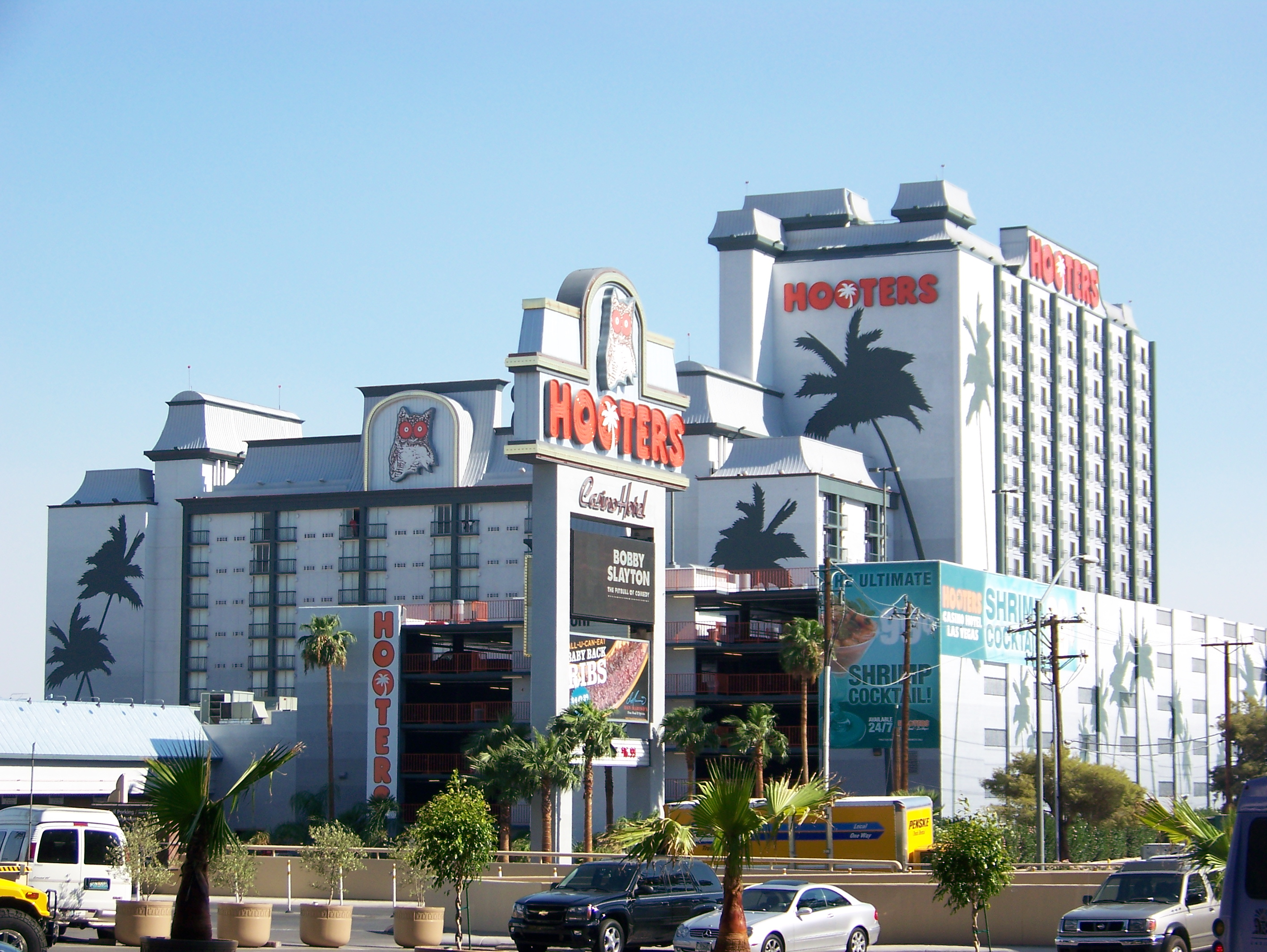
Former Hooters Casino in Las Vegas, Nevada, photographed in 2009

In response to declining sales, in 2017, the company launched a fast casual spinoff of its format called "Hoots". Hoots is distinguished from its original concept primarily by a reduction in menu items and employment of both male and female servers who are modestly dressed in t-shirts and khakis.

Locations
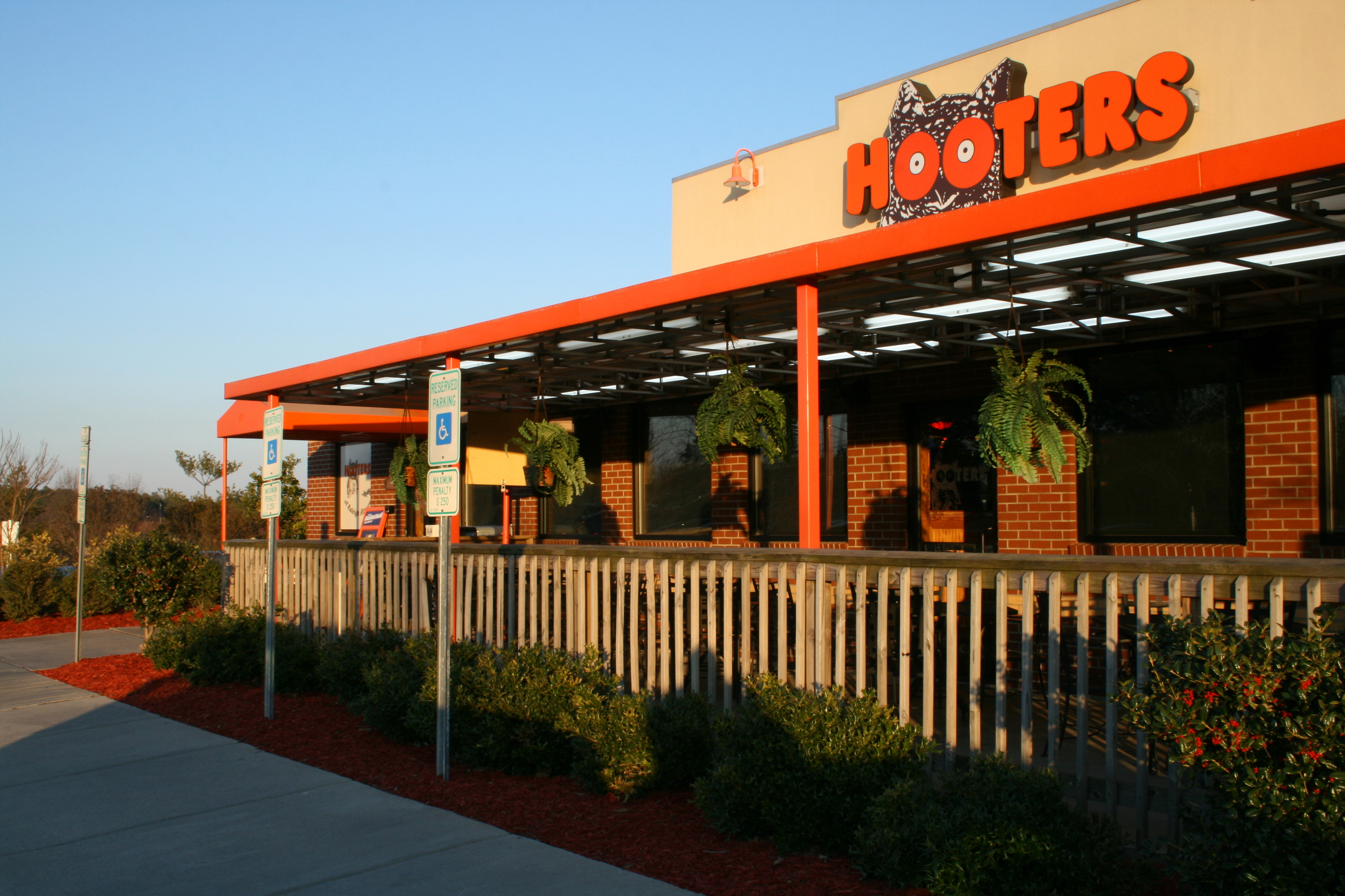
Hooters in Morrisville, North Carolina, 2009

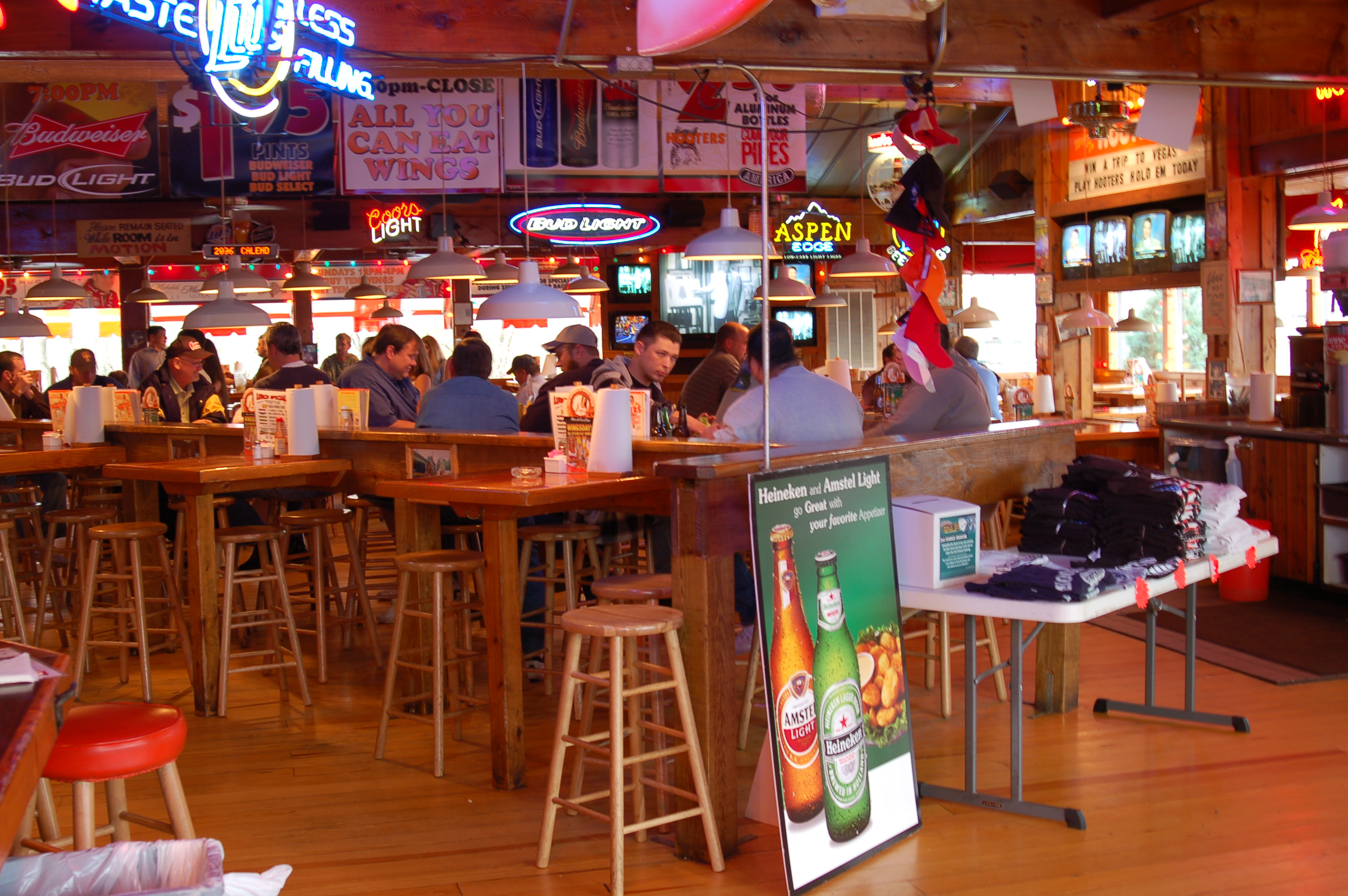
The interior of a Hooters restaurant in Chattanooga, Tennessee, in 2006

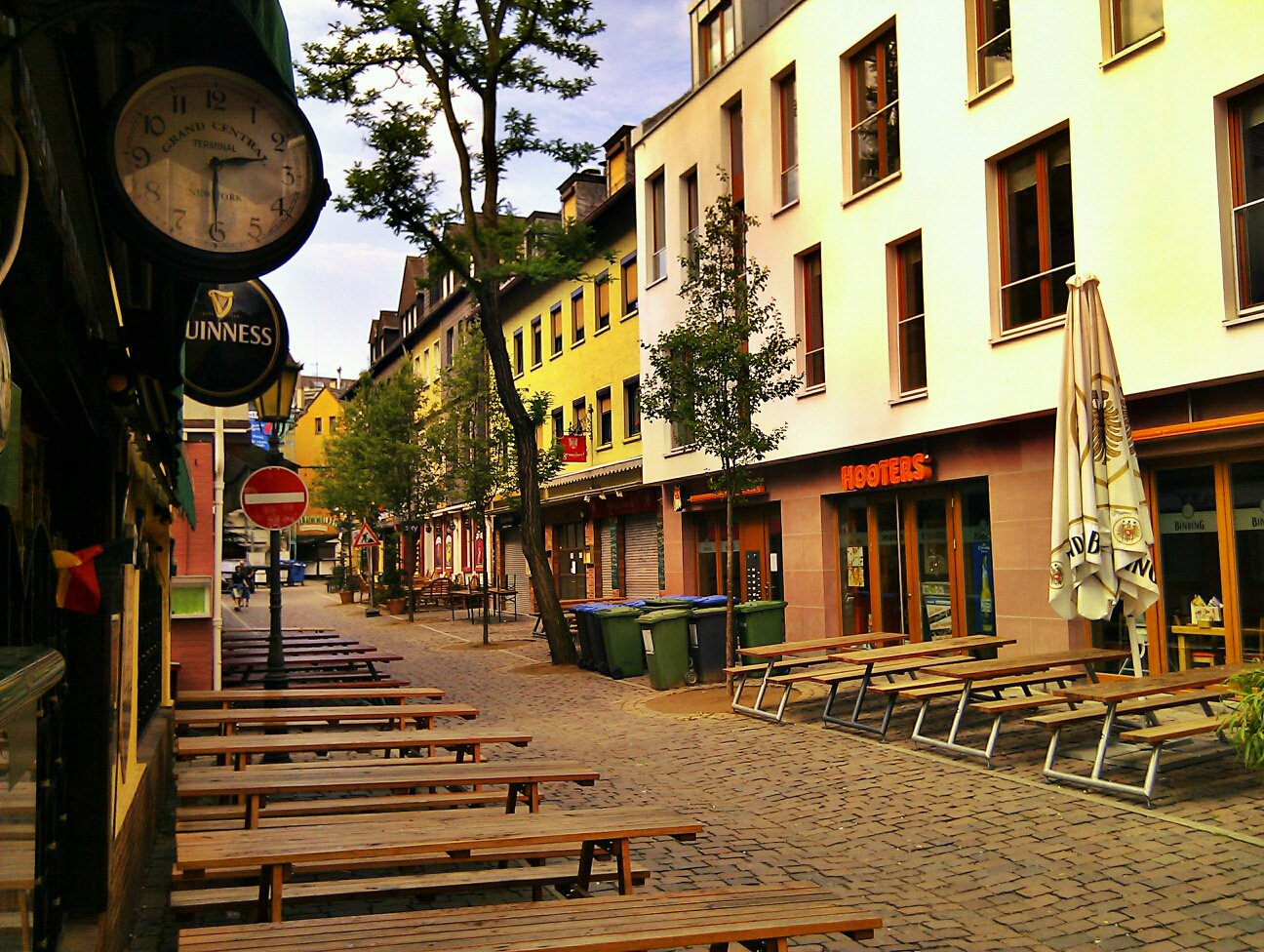
Hooters restaurant in Alt-Sachsenhausen, Frankfurt, Germany

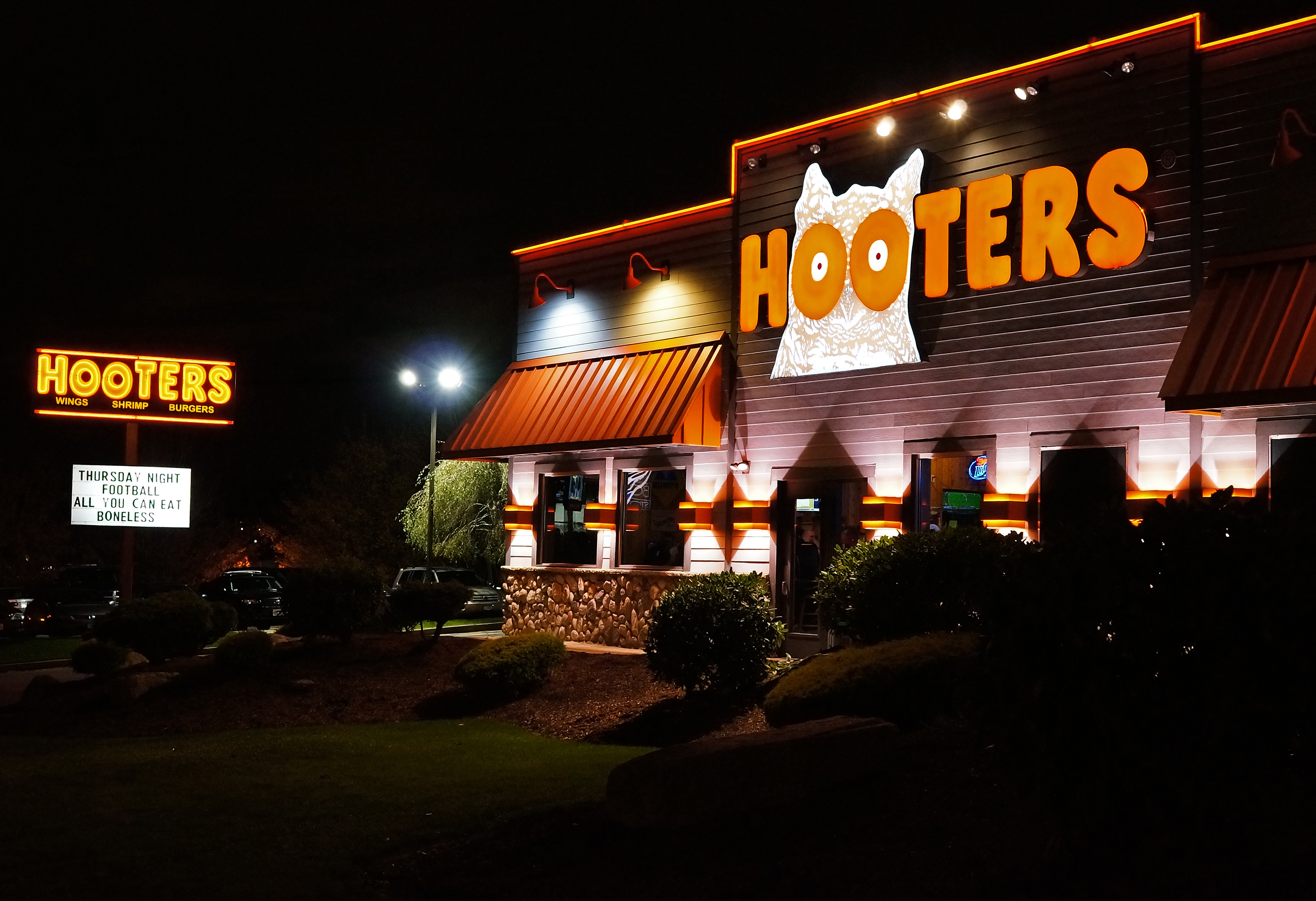
Hooters restaurant at night, Route One, Saugus, Massachusetts

== Hooters Girls ==
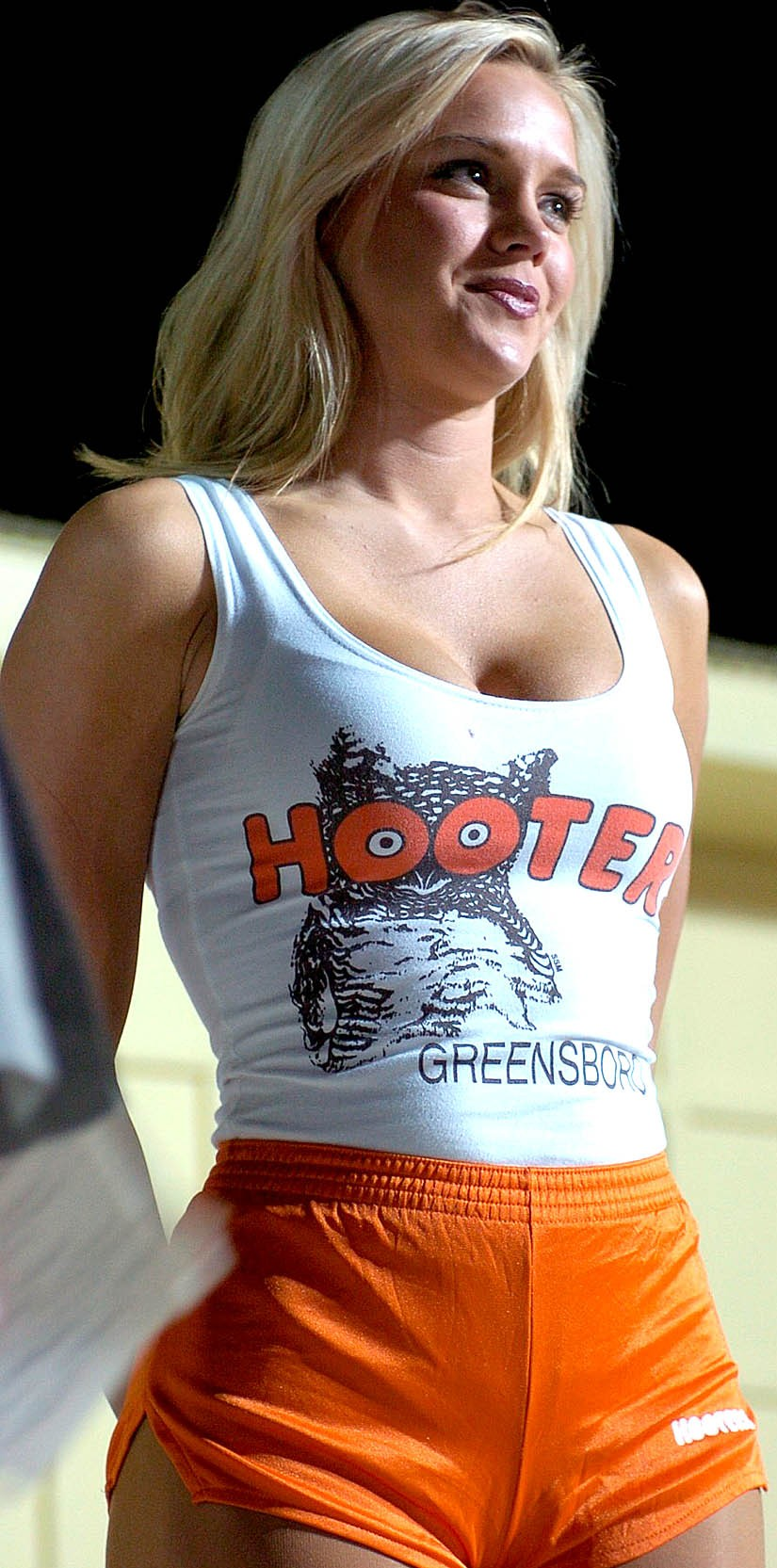
Hooters Calendar Girl Melissa Poe in 2004

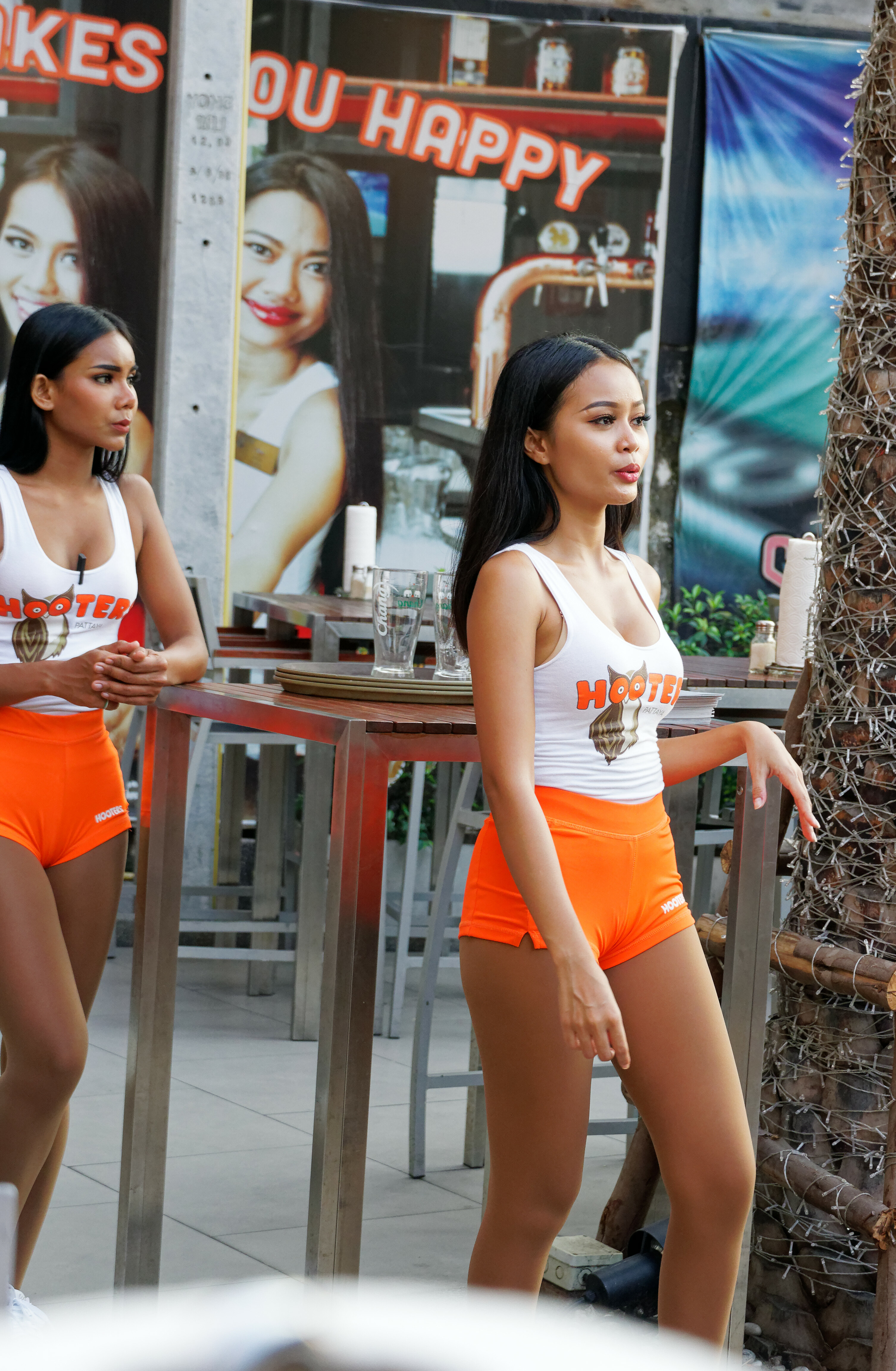
Two Hooters girls in Thailand in 2019

The appearance of the waitresses is a main selling feature of the restaurant. A Hooters Girl is a waitress employed by the Hooters restaurant chain, and they are recognizable by their uniform of a white tank top with the "Hootie the Owl" logo and the location name on the front paired with short nylon orange Dolphin shorts. The remainder of the Hooters Girls uniform consists of the restaurant's brown ticket pouch (or a black one with the black uniform), tan pantyhose, white loose socks, and clean white shoes. Men who work at Hooters wear Hooters hats, T-shirts with long pants, Bermuda shorts, or attire more suitable for kitchen use.

=== Employee handbook requirements ===
An older version of the Hooters Employee Handbook (prior to October 2006), published in The Smoking Gun, reads:

Customers can go to many places for wings and beer, but it is our Hooters Girls who make our concept unique. Hooters offers its customers the look of the "All American Cheerleader, Surfer, Girl Next Door."

Female employees are required to sign that they "acknowledge and affirm" the following:

1. My job duties require I wear the designated Hooters Girl uniform.
2. My job duties require that I interact with and entertain the customers.
3. The Hooters concept is based on female sex appeal and the work environment is one in which joking and entertaining conversations are commonplace.

== Marketing ==
=== Charitable activities ===
Hooters has actively supported charities through its Hooters Community Endowment Fund, also known as HOO.C.E.F., a play on UNICEF. It has provided money and/or volunteers to charities such as Habitat for Humanity, The V Foundation for Cancer Research, Operation Homefront, Make-A-Wish Foundation, Special Olympics, Muscular Dystrophy Association and Stop Hunger Now. In addition, after the 2007 death of Kelly Jo Dowd, a former Hooters Girl, Hooters calendar cover girl and later restaurant general manager, Hooters began a campaign in support of breast cancer research, with awareness of the issue being spread through the Kelly Jo Dowd Fund. By 2010 the chain raised over $2 million for the cause. One dollar of each calendar sold goes for breast cancer research.

In 2009, Hooters partnered with Operation Homefront to establish The Valentine Fund in honor of fallen soldier SOCS Thomas J. Valentine. The fund supports the families of US Special Forces service members and other military families. Thomas J. Valentine, a Navy SEAL Senior Chief Petty Officer, was killed during a training exercise February 13, 2008. He left behind his wife, Christina, and two young children. Hooters established a fund in Valentine's name through Operation Homefront.

=== Athletics and promotions ===
Hooters is involved in the sports world. Previous sponsorships include the Miami Hooters, a now defunct Arena Football League team. Hooters formerly sponsored the USAR Hooters Pro Cup, an automobile racing series, and the NGA Pro Golf Tour, a minor league golf tour.

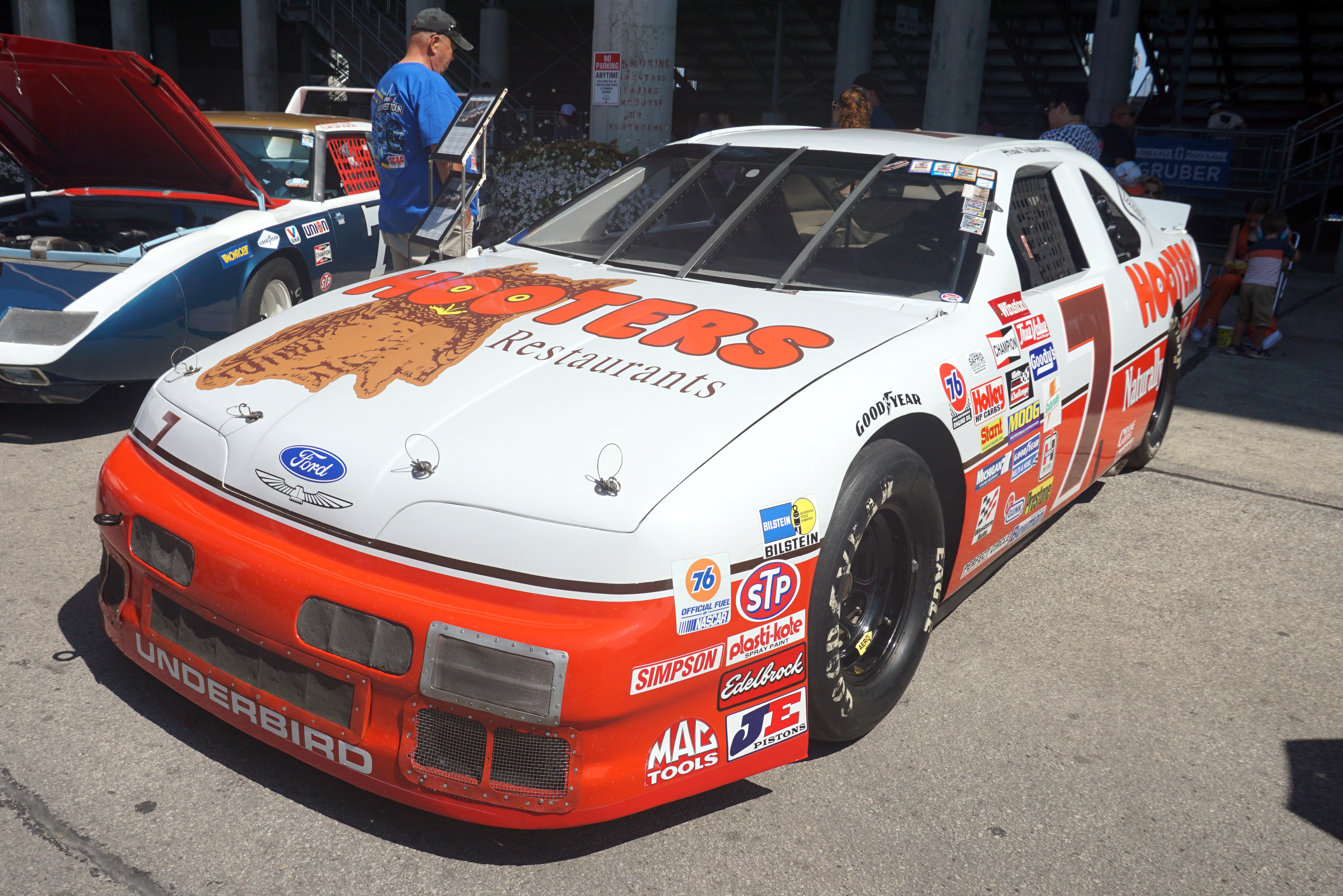
Alan Kulwicki's No. 7 Hooters Ford Thunderbird

In 1992, Hooters sponsored NASCAR driver Alan Kulwicki as he won the Winston Cup Championship, beating Bill Elliott by ten points, the closest margin in NASCAR prior to The Chase era. On April 1, 1993, Kulwicki, along with several others including Hooters Chairman Bob Brooks's son Mark, were killed in a plane crash near Bristol, Tennessee. They were flying back to the track for Sunday's race after making a sponsor appearance at a Hooters in Knoxville, Tennessee. Hooters remained in the sport, sponsoring drivers like Loy Allen Jr., Rick Mast and Brett Bodine before ending their involvement in 2003. The restaurant returned to NASCAR in 2007 to sponsor a Craftsman Truck Series team led by Jason White, Derrike Cope and Brad Keselowski. Six years later, Hooters sponsored Nationwide Series driver Nelson Piquet Jr.'s car. For the 2016 Bojangles' Southern 500 at Darlington Raceway, Hooters made a comeback in the Cup Series with a one-off paint scheme for Greg Biffle. Hooters most recently sponsored the No. 9 of Chase Elliott from 2017 to 2024.

Hooters has sponsored the Major League Eating-sanctioned "Hooters Worldwide Wing Eating Championship" since 2012. Hooters has also licensed its name for the Hooters Road Trip PlayStation racing game. Furthermore, Hooters licensed the Hooters Calendar for Hooters Calendar Girl, a mobile wallpaper application, and Hooters Calendar Girl Tubin', a mobile game, both by Oasys Mobile. It was also one of several real world brands that appeared in the 2011 video game Homefront.

Since 1986, the restaurant has issued a calendar featuring Hooters Girls, with signings taking place in some of their restaurants. Since 1996, Hooters has held Miss Hooters International Swimsuit Pageant, a competition of Hooters Girls from around the world. The pageant once aired on Spike TV and is now livestreamed to Hooters restaurants and eventually posted on YouTube. An African-American woman won the Miss Hooters pageant for the first time in 2010: LeAngela Davis of Columbus, Ohio.

== Criticism and controversies ==
=== Objectification ===
Hooters has been criticized for objectifying women.

The Orange County National Organization for Women (NOW), as well as three other California chapters, filed a complaint against Hooters with several district attorneys in 2010. They criticized Hooters for “having it both ways” and operating as a “legal bait and switch” by simultaneously advertising itself as a “family restaurant” and allowing minors, while defending itself against charges of sex discrimination by claiming that the restaurant is based on female sex appeal. The complaint called on authorities to either force Hooters to stop admitting children onto the premises or stop sex discrimination in its hiring practices.

Several studies suggest that working at Hooters and other "breastaurants" takes a psychological toll on its employees, with higher levels of objectification being associated with lower job satisfaction, and higher levels of anxiety and eating disorders.

However, others have argued that feminism is about having a choice and that being able to work as a woman in whichever industry the individual woman in question chooses along with the ability for women to make their own money is empowering. Hooters, in response to such criticism, has said the company regularly donates to charities that help promote women's entrepreneurship and often promote Hooters Girls to management positions. 40% of Hooters restaurants managers are reportedly female.

=== Legal history ===
In 1997, three men from the Chicago area sued Hooters after being denied employment at an Orland Park, Illinois, restaurant. Each of them was awarded $19,100. Four men who filed a similar lawsuit in Maryland received $10,350 each. The settlement allows Hooters to continue gender-restricted hiring in its wait staff; the chain agreed to create other support jobs, like bartenders and hosts, that must be filled without regard to gender.

In 2000, a federal jury ordered Hooters to pay $275,000 to former waitress Sara Steinhoff, who claimed in her lawsuit that she was the target of unwanted sexual advances, demeaning behavior and recrimination from managers while she worked at the Hooters in Newport, Kentucky, between October 1996 and October 1997.

In 2001, a jury determined Hooters of Augusta Inc. willfully violated the Telephone Consumer Protection Act by sending unsolicited advertising faxes. The class-action lawsuit, brought in June 1995 by Sam Nicholson, included 1,320 others who said they received the advertising faxes from Hooters. Atlanta-based Hooters of America Inc., the local restaurant's parent company, paid out $11 million. The jury determined that six faxes were sent to each plaintiff. With a $500 fine for each, that amounts to a $3,000 award per plaintiff.

Also in 2001, Jodee Berry, a waitress at a Hooters in Panama City Beach, Florida, won a beer sales contest, for which the promised prize was a new Toyota automobile. However, the manager awarded her a "toy Yoda" instead, claiming the contest was an April Fool's Day joke. Berry filed a lawsuit against Gulf Coast Wings, the local franchisee, and later reached a settlement.

In 2004, it was found that job applicants to a Hooters in West Covina, California, were secretly filmed while undressing, prompting a civil suit filed against the national restaurant chain in Los Angeles Superior Court. The company responded to the incident with additional employee training.

In 2009, Nikolai Grushevski, a man from Corpus Christi, Texas, filed a lawsuit because Hooters would not hire him as a waiter. Grushevski and Hooters reached a confidential settlement on April 13. In September 2009, the US Equal Employment Opportunity Commission filed a lawsuit against a North Carolina charter airline (formerly Hooters Air, owned by Hooters of America) on behalf of Chau Nguyen, an Asian flight attendant fired three years prior after complaining only white workers were being promoted.

In May 2010, a lawsuit was filed against Hooters in Michigan after an employee was given a job performance review and was told that her shirt and short size could use some improvement by two women who held positions at the headquarters in Atlanta. Michigan is the only state that includes height and weight as bounds for non-discrimination in hiring. The plaintiff alleges that she was made the offer of a free gym membership and told that if she did not improve in 30 days, her employment would be terminated. The company denied that they threatened to fire the plaintiffs, and the suit was settled out of court.

In 2011, a number of former Hooters executives left to start the Twin Peaks franchise group. Hooters filed suit and alleged that former Hooters executives stole trade secrets and management documents as part as their move to the new restaurant chain.

In 2012, former employee Jheri Stratton filed suit after catching tuberculosis from one of her managers.

Also in 2012, Kisuk Cha, a Korean American immigrant who placed a takeout order at a Hooters in Queens, New York, sued the restaurant chain for racial discrimination after noticing a racial slur printed on a cash register receipt by a hostess who later confessed and subsequently resigned. The case was dismissed in 2013.

On April 2, 2015, former employee Farryn Johnson was awarded $250,000 after an arbitrator found that racial discrimination contributed to her termination. Johnson was terminated in August 2013 after her store manager (from the Hooters in Baltimore, Maryland) told her that she could not have blonde highlights in her hair. Johnson filed a civil rights complaint with the State of Maryland Civil Rights Division where her attorneys stated the applicability of the dress code for Black Americans and everyone else (e.g. non-Hispanic Whites, Hispanic/Latino, Asian/Pacific Islander American) where one set of policies pertains to a certain group of people was considered as racial discrimination. A statement from Hooters of America by Ericka Whitaker (Hooters of America senior brand manager) stated that she had no issue of having blonde highlights as a Hooters Girl prior to becoming a brand manager and the company will continue to diversify its employees, from the restaurant to the annual Hooters International Swimsuit Pageant.

On September 11, 2017, former Philadelphia-area Hooters waitress Jade Velez filed a lawsuit against Hooters alleging she was a victim of workplace sexual assault by a former kitchen employee. The lawsuit named the employee, three former managers at the Northeast Philadelphia Hooters restaurant where she worked, and Hooters of America, LLC et al as defendants. As of July 2020, the outcome of the case was still pending.

On July 16, 2019, Scott Peterson, who was one of two men who alleged they were sexually harassed by a male boss while working for Hooters in the Los Angeles area, reached a settlement with the restaurant chain in the Los Angeles Superior Court, though terms of the settlement were not publicly revealed. The other plaintiff, Paul "PJ" Cagnina, obtained a settlement in May 2017.

On August 22, 2024, Hendrick Motorsports of NASCAR announced that they would sue Hooters for $1.705 million plus unpaid sponsorship fees. On March 21, 2025, it was reported that Hooters agreed to pay $900K to Hendrick Motorsports.

On October 22, 2024, Hooters of America settled a claim from the Equal Employment Opportunity Commission that black employees were not recalled back to work after the COVID-19 pandemic at the same levels as white employees. Hooters paid $250,000 and signed a consent decree forbidding use of standards that allow for use of color or race.

=== Legal status ===
In employment discrimination law in the United States, employers are generally allowed to consider characteristics that would otherwise be discriminatory if they are bona fide occupational qualifications (BFOQ). For example, a manufacturer of men's clothing may lawfully advertise exclusively for male models. Hooters has argued a BFOQ defense, which applies when the "essence of the business operation would be undermined if the business eliminated its discriminatory policy".

== Film ==
In August 2026, it was announced that a biopic about the origins of Hooters was in development.

== See also ==
- AK Racing
- Betel nut beauty
- Bikini barista
- Café con piernas
- Karen's Diner
- Maid café
- Raisins (South Park)—parody episode
- Tilted Kilt
