= Villarruel =

Villarruel is a surname. Notable people with the surname include:

- Antonia M. Villarruel, American nurse
- Gustavo Villarruel (born 1993), Argentine footballer
- Lucas Villarruel (born 1990), Argentine footballer
- Victoria Villarruel (born 1975), Argentine lawyer and politician
