= Edwin De La Rosa =

American BMX rider

Edwin De La Rosa is a Panamanian-American BMX rider and photographer. He was born in Panama and moved to Brooklyn at the age of three. He has been riding BMX since the age of 13. He has been referred to as one of the most influential BMX riders of a generation, such as by ESPN who stated that he is "credited with making street riding look smooth."

De La Rosa's first picture in a magazine was in 2000 in Ride BMX US. He was in his first video for Animal Bikes in 2001, which went on to be influential to BMX riding style. He has spoken on his experience as a Black BMX rider and encountering racism.
