= Damu Smith =

American peace activist

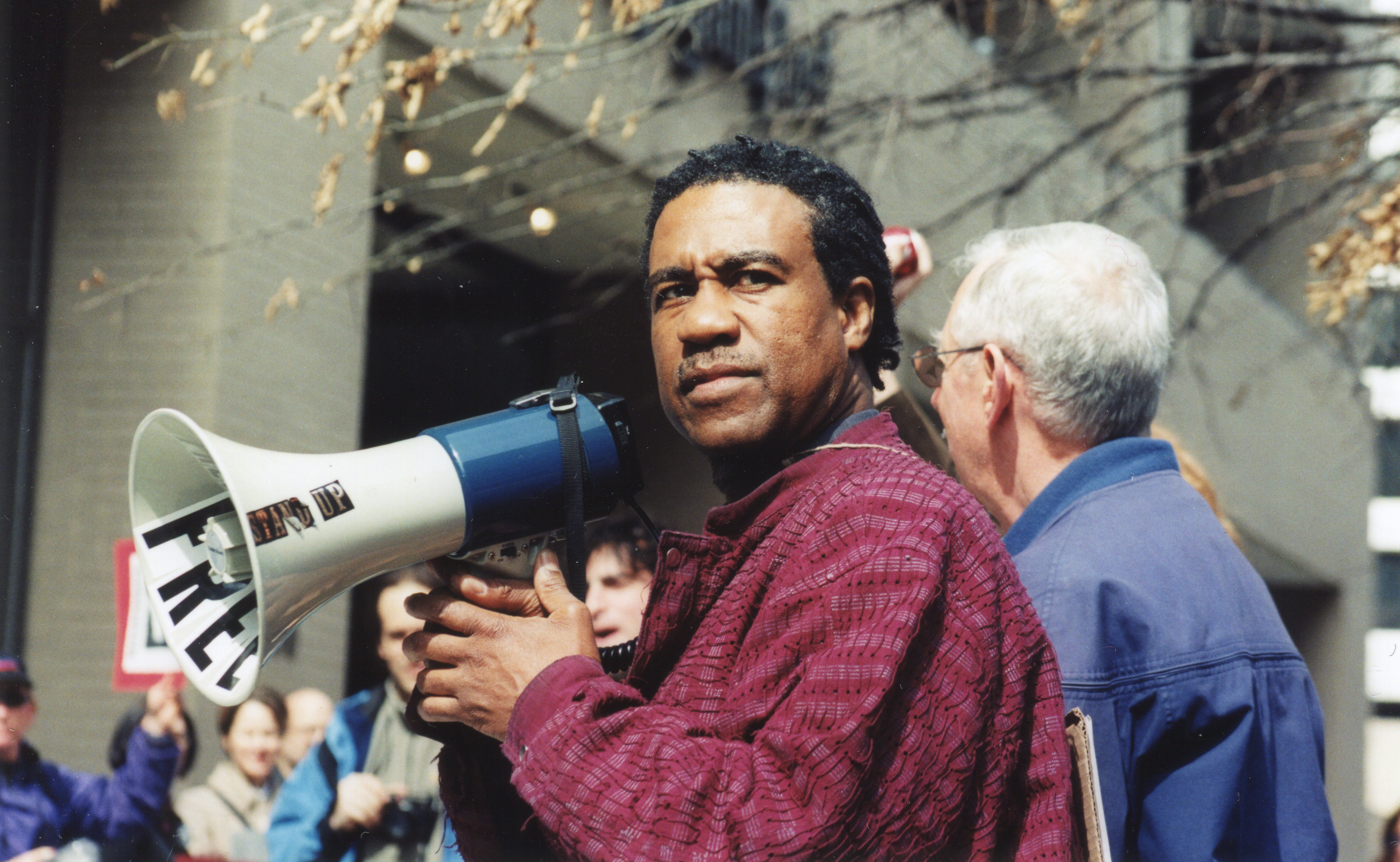
Smith on March 12, 2003 at the Black Voices for Peace die-in event in front of The Washington Post building in Washington, D.C.

Damu Amiri Imara Smith (1951 – May 5, 2006) was an American peace activist.

== Early life and education ==
Damu Smith was born in 1951 in St. Louis, Missouri, to Sylvester and Vernice Smith. His father was a firefighter and his mother was a licensed practical nurse. Smith was raised with his two brothers and sister in the Carr Square Village housing project. A working-class family, they often struggled to make ends meet, sometimes receiving welfare or other government assistance. Smith has said that this experience developed in him a great sensitivity to the plight of low-income communities, and played a central role in shaping his views as an adult and as an activist. As a high school student, Smith had the chance to attend some of the Black Solidarity Day rallies in Cairo, Illinois, where he listened to speeches by Amiri Baraka, Nina Simone, and Jesse Jackson, and toured black neighborhoods where white supremacists had sprayed houses with gunfire, a sight that changed his life. As a freshman at St. John's University in Minnesota, and president of the Organization of Afro-American Students, Smith led a protest and takeover of the school’s administrative offices to demand a Black studies program. It was during that time that he changed his name to Damu Amiri Imara Smith, the first three words meaning ‘‘blood,’’ ‘‘leadership,’’ and ‘‘strength’’ in Swahili, respectively.

== Career ==
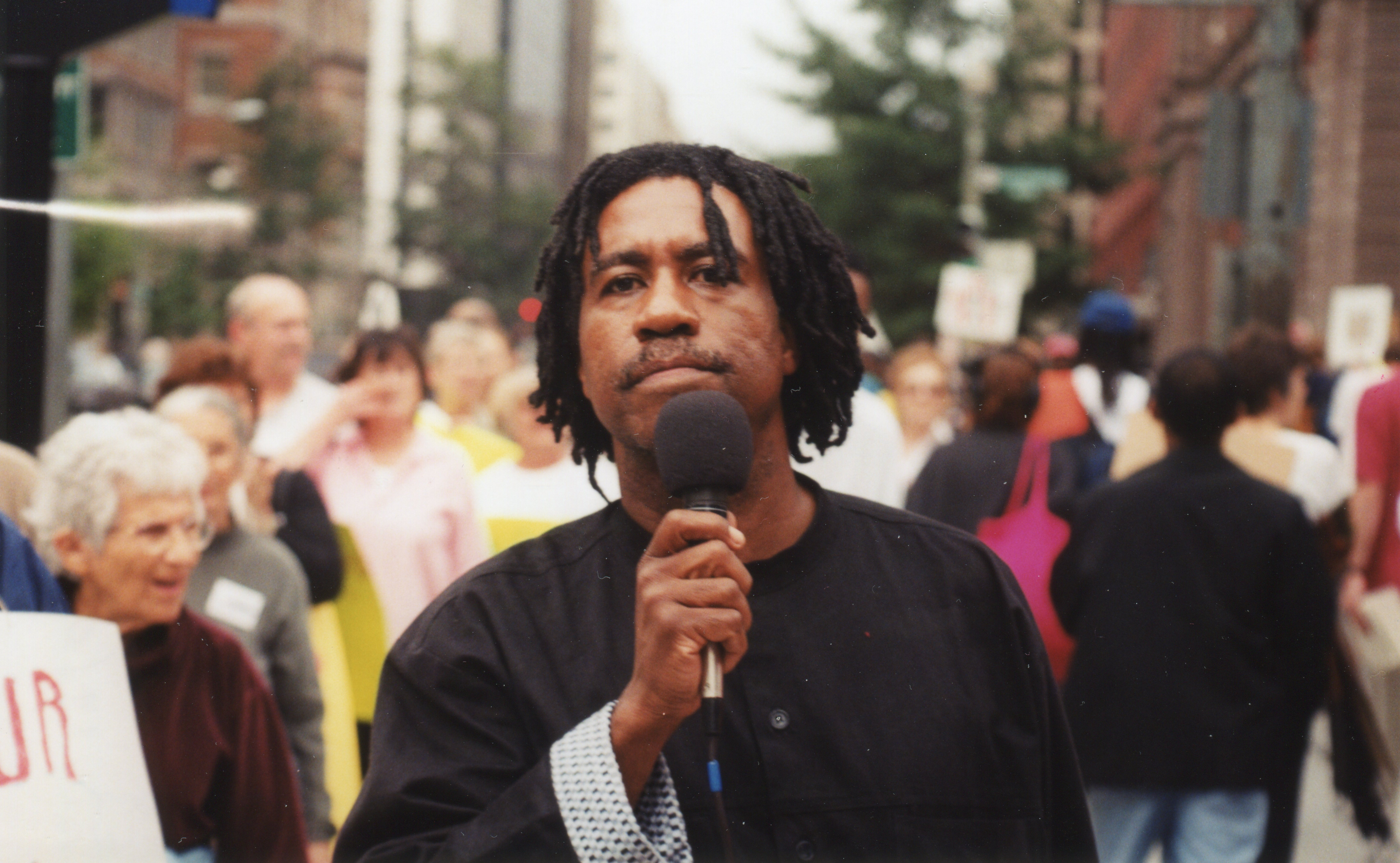
Smith on Columbus Day 2002 at the Witness for Peace picket line near the White House.

In 1973, Smith moved to Washington D.C., where he began the next chapter in his lifelong mission of advocating for social justice in the United States and abroad. He was one of the first African-American activists to fight environmental racism. During 1978, 1979 and 1980, he chaired the local chapter of the Alliance Against Racist and Political Repression, whose national chairpersons were Angela Davis and Benjamin Davis, and organized many protests and educational events against racism in America and apartheid in Zimbabwe, Namibia and South Africa. Over the next 30 years, Smith's activism included vigilance in the fight against apartheid in South Africa as Executive Director of the Washington Office on Africa and co-founder of Artists for a Free South Africa. Additionally, Smith focused his energy and attention on broad-based efforts to expose gun violence and police brutality, and was also active in peace and nuclear weapons freeze campaigns, working as the Associate Director of the Washington Office of the American Friends Service Committee. He spoke out against the U.S. invasion of Iraq in the 1990s during the Gulf War.

Smith was known for his pioneering leadership in the environmental justice movement, working as the first environmental justice coordinator for the Southern Organizing Committee for Economic and Social Justice. After touring cities severely impacted by chemical pollution and seeing the devastating impacts of these practices on low-income and African American communities, he organized Toxic Tours in the South for Greenpeace. In 1999, he coordinated the largest environmental justice conference ever held, an event which led to the formation of the National Black Environmental Justice Network, the first ever network of Black environmental justice activists, of which he served as the Executive Director.

He was the founder and executive director of Black Voices for Peace.

== Personal life ==
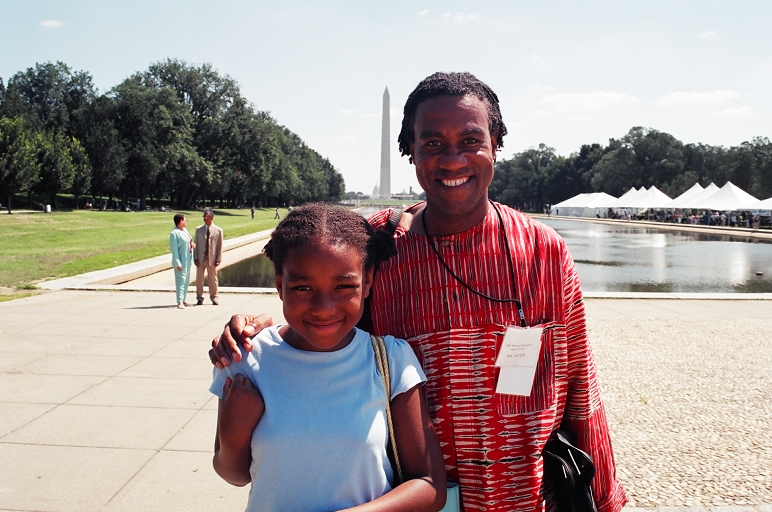
Smith and his daughter in 2003 before the 40th Anniversary of the March of Washington.

Smith died on May 5, 2006, of colon cancer at George Washington University Hospital. He was survived by his companion Adeleke Foster, a daughter, sister, and two brothers.

== Awards and honors ==
In 1986, Smith received the Malcolm X Community Service Award. He received the National Bar Association Community Service Award in 1989. The Southern Christian Leadership Conference presented Smith with an award in 1996 and in 1998, he received the St. James Citizen for Jobs and the Environment Award.
