= Edward C. Droste =

American businessman

Edward C. Droste (born April 22, 1951) is an American businessman. He is a co-founder of the Hooters restaurant chain and played a major role in various marketing initiatives that helped it to grow. Droste also co-founded several other restaurant chains, the resort management company Provident Resorts, and the marketing firm Provident Advertising and Marketing.

== Early life and family ==
Droste is a native of Waverly, Iowa. Many of the other co-founders of Hooters were also from the Midwest, and according to Droste the casual dining atmosphere of neighborhood Midwestern restaurants was a major influence on the Hooters concept.

== Education ==
In 1968 Droste was elected Iowa Boys State Governor.

He graduated from Iowa State University in 1973, with a B.S. degree in Industrial Administration and Political Science. He was president of his graduating class, and was named National Top Alumnus of the Year for his fraternity, Tau Kappa Epsilon. He later dedicated a study hall in his name at Iowa State's business school.

However, Droste claims to have barely managed to earn a degree, with only a 2.3 average GPA. His grades deterred him from pursuing his hopes for a career in law.

== Career ==
Immediately after graduating, in 1973, Droste moved to Florida to work for U.S. Home Corporation, quickly rising to Vice President of the management subsidiary of U.S. Home, the youngest person at that time to hold the position. Droste oversaw property management for the company's high-rise condominiums in Florida's West Coast.

Droste left U.S. Home in 1976 to start Bieder Management, which handled distressed property management for lenders and developers. His work took him around the country, where he saw many different kinds of bars and restaurants, informing his later career.

Droste and five partners opened the first Hooters restaurant in Clearwater, Florida, on October 4, 1983. In the early days, when the restaurant was suffering from limited traffic, Droste came up with several unorthodox advertising and public relations efforts. In one instance, Droste wore a chicken costume to draw customers, and also painted a Hooters sign on a partially-sunken boat.

Droste is credited with shaping the Hooters persona by recruiting the first face of Hooters. Discovered in a Clearwater Beach bikini contest, Lynne Austin became the “Original Hooters Girl” and appeared on billboards as well as frequent radio show stops promoting the brand.

He later submitted Austin's photo for promotional purposes to Playboy, and she was eventually selected as a Playboy Playmate in July 1986. Austin's appearance resulted in a huge spike in national awareness for the chain.

Beider Management was later renamed Provident Resorts, which now manages several resorts throughout central and southern Florida. Through a subsidiary, Provident Advertising, Droste helped develop the restaurant chains Pete & Shorty's Tavern, with two locations in Tampa Bay; and Adobe Gila's, which currently has four locations in Florida and the Midwest. Droste and other partners also developed Splitsville, a luxury bowling lane with seven locations nationwide, including one at the Disney Springs resort in Orlando.

Droste retains a stake in Provident Resorts and serves as chairman of the board.

== Public service ==
Droste serves on a variety of nonprofit and community boards. He is the chairman of the board of the Foundation of the Moffitt Cancer Center, which oversees fundraising and development efforts for the center. Moffitt, located in Tampa, Florida, is the 3rd largest cancer center in the country by number of patients seen.

Droste also serves on the Governor's Florida Prostate Cancer Advisory Council as a Patient Advocate, and on the advisory board for the Pinellas County, Florida branch of Habitat for Humanity and also on the board of directors for the OutBack Bowl.

In 2008, Droste and his wife Marsha received the Gayle Sierens Volunteer of the Year in Philanthropy Award.

In addition to Iowa State, Ed and Marsha have dedicated “Droste Dens” at several other nonprofit locations including Moffitt Cancer Center and the Bartels Lutheran Retirement Community in Waverly, Iowa.

== Personal life ==
Droste married Marsha Posey in May 2006. He proposed in 2005 at a Miami Swimsuit Pageant in front of an audience of 2,000, under the pretext of presenting a “Manager of the Year” award. The proposal was also broadcast to 400 Hooters restaurants nationwide.

Marsha Droste is a former Hooters Girl, though she and her husband met after she had left a Kentucky Hooters location to work for the Home Shopping Network in Florida. Marsha founded and runs the gift company Forever Pillows.

Droste is a close friend of Jon Gruden, former head coach of the Oakland/Las Vegas Raiders and former ESPN analyst and coach of the Tampa Bay Buccaneers. Droste reportedly gave Gruden one of the original Hooters chicken masks as a gag gift due to Gruden's summer stint as a Hooters cook during his teens.

Droste is related to Ed Droste, founder of the indie-rock band Grizzly Bear.

== Recognition ==
In 2004, the Clearwater Regional Chamber of Commerce honored Droste with the “Mr. Clearwater” award for his service on behalf of the Clearwater community.

In 2012, Droste was inducted into the Tampa Bay Business Hall of Fame.

In 2014, Ed Droste was named a “Florida Icon” by Florida Trend Magazine.
