= Hooters Road Trip =

2002 video game

- PlayStation cover art
- Developer: Hoplite Research
- Publisher: Ubi Soft
- Platforms: Windows, PlayStation
- Release: Windows: NA: March 25, 2002; PlayStation: NA: March 26, 2002
- Genre: Racing
- Mode: Single-player

Hooters Road Trip is a racing video game released for PlayStation in 2002. A Windows version was published the same year as Free Wheelin' USA.

== Development ==
It was produced by Hoplite Research, a company founded by former playtester Manny Granillo. It is built around the license of the Hooters restaurant chain, featuring both real life and computer-generated images and video footage of its iconic "Hooters Girl" waitresses.

Art assets found in the game's files suggest the PlayStation release was originally also to be titled Free Wheelin' USA with the Hooters license later added on.

== Reception ==
Reception

Aggregate score
Aggregator	Score	
Aggregator	PC	PS
Metacritic	22/100	30/100

Review scores
Publication	Score	
Publication	PC	PS
Computer Gaming World	1/5	N/A
Electronic Gaming Monthly	N/A	4/10
Game Informer	N/A	2/10
GameSpot	N/A	2.5/10
GameZone	5/10	4/10
IGN	2/10	N/A
Official U.S. PlayStation Magazine	N/A	0.5/5
PC Gamer (US)	18%	N/A
Maxim	N/A	4/10

Hooters Road Trip received "unfavorable" reviews on both platforms according to video game review aggregator Metacritic. Game Informer rated this game as one of the worst games ever made, and it was one of the last games released for the original Sony PlayStation. In 2017, Gamesradar ranked the game 49th in their "The 50 Worst Games of All Time" list.
