= National Association of Hispanic Nurses =

Non-profit professional association in the United States

The National Association of Hispanic Nurses (NAHN) is a non-profit professional nursing organization in the United States, committed to ensuring high-quality health care delivery to Hispanic communities and the promotion of professionalism and excellence among bilingual and bicultural nurses.

== History ==
Hispanic Health Care International
- Discipline: Nursing
- Language: English, Spanish

Publication details
- History: 2002–present
- Publisher: SAGE Publishing
- Frequency: Quarterly

Standard abbreviations
- ISO 4: Hisp. Health Care Int.

Indexing
- ISSN: 1540-4153 (print); 1938-8993 (web)

Links
- Journal homepage; Online access (vols. 1–13)

The National Association of Hispanic Nurses (NAHN) was founded in 1975 by Ildaura Murillo-Rohde. The year before, at an American Nurses Association meeting, a group of Hispanic nurses had met regarding the feasibility of establishing an ANA Hispanic caucus. Though they did not affiliate with ANA, the group established the National Association of Spanish-Speaking Spanish-Surnamed Nurses (NASSSN) in 1976. Murillo-Rohde incorporated NASSSN in Washington State in 1977 where, at that time, she was employed as Associate Dean of the School of Nursing at the University of Washington in Seattle. “I saw that I was the only Hispanic nurse who was going to Washington to work with the federal government, review research and educational grants…there was nobody else. I looked behind me and thought: ‘Where are my people?’ -Dr. Ildaura Murillo-Rhode.

The group was renamed as the National Association of Hispanic Nurses in 1979. NAHN launched its official professional peer-reviewed publication, Hispanic Health Care International (HHCI) at the 27th Annual Conference held July 2002 in Miami, Florida. It was initially published by Springer Publishing, but is now published by SAGE Publishing since 2016. HHCI is a bilingual journal (English and Spanish) and is quarterly.

=== Mission ===
NAHN defines its mission as: “committed to advancing the health in Hispanic communities and to lead, promote and advocate the educational, professional, and leadership opportunities for Hispanic nurses.”

== Leadership ==
=== National ===
Leadership at the National Association of Hispanic Nurses consists of: an executive board including a President, President-Elect, Immediate Past-President, Treasurer, and Secretary, the Board of Directors including the executive board plus five board members, and an executive director.

Past Presidents:

1976-1979 Ildaura Murillo-Rohde, PhD, RN*, FAAN (Living Legend)

1979-1980 Ildaura Murillo-Rohde, PhD, RN*, FAAN

1980-1982 Berta Mejia, MSN, RN*

1982-1984 Hector Hugo Gonzalez, PhD, VR-RN (Retired)

1984-1986 Henrietta Villaescusa, MPH, RN*

1986-1988 Henrietta Villaescusa, MPH, RN*

1988-1990 Janie Menchaca Wilson, PhD, RN

1990-1992 Janie Menchaca Wilson, PhD, RN

1992-1994 Sara Torres, PhD, RN, FAAN

1994-1996 Sara Torres, PhD, RN, FAAN

1996-1998 Antonia Villarruel, PhD, RN, FAAN

1998-2000 Carmen Portillo, PhD, RN, FAAN

2000-2002 Mary Lou de Leon Siantz, PhD, RN, FAAN

2002-2004 Nilda (Nena) Peragallo, DrPH, RN, FAAN

2004-2006 Rev. Dr. Rudy Valenzuela, PhD, NP, FAANP, FAAN

2006-2008 Maria Tere Villot, BSN, RN

2008-2010 Norma Martinez-Rogers, PhD, RN, FAAN (Living Legend)

2010-2012 Angie Millan, DNP, RN, FAAN

2012-2014 Jose Alejandro-White, PhD, RN, NEA-BC, MBA, CNE, CCM, FACHE, FAAN

2014-2016 Daniel Suarez, MA, RN, NYAM Fellow

2016-2018 Anabell Castro-Thompson, MSN, RN, ANP-C, FAAN, FAANP

2018-2020 Norma Cuellar, PhD, RN, FAAN

2020 Alana Cueto, MSN, RN, CNL

2021-2024 Adrianna Nava, PhD, MPA, RN, FAAN,

2024-2026 Veronica Vital, PhD, MSN, MLS, RN, FAAN

2026-2028 Grace Grau, DNP, APRN, AACC, FAAN

=== Membership and Local chapters ===
NAHN is a 501(c)(3) national nonprofit organization headquartered at 201 E. Main Street, Suite 810, Lexington, Kentucky 40507, USA. Membership is available in eight categories: General, Student, Emeritus, International, Nursing Affiliate, Affiliate, Corporate, and Group. Memberships benefit list: advocacy, continuing education, journal subscription, student support, events, and networking. There are approximately 3,200 active members, with about 46 chapters in 44 states.

Leadership at the local level has shifted to mirror the national model. Instead of a vice president, there is a President-Elect as well as the Immediate Past-President. This serves the function to maintain continuity and order as well as to ensure a smooth transition when electing new officials.

== Advocacy and annual conference ==
NAHN empowers its members as advocates for Hispanic health through training and an annual Latino Leadership Institute and Hispanic Health Policy Summit in Washington, DC. The summit unites the Latino healthcare community to address health issues affecting the Hispanic population and propose possible solutions.

Each summer, NAHN hosts a conference in which hundreds of nurses attend to discuss issues concerning the Hispanic community, share best evidence-based practices, and view exhibits from nurse researchers, nursing students, recruiters, nursing schools, non-governmental organizations such as the American Heart Association, and many research institutions from across the nation. Members in attendance participate in a community service project which during the 2015 conference was a rally to create over 10,000 meals to end world hunger through a partnership with Stop Hunger Now.

NAHN celebrated its 50th year on July 16–18, 2025, in Dallas, Texas, at the Westin Convention Center at Las Colinas. The annual event culminated with the scholarship and awards ceremony. NAHN nurses, students, researchers, and healthcare professionals gathered to gain knowledge, network, and commemorate 50 years of NAHN. The conference theme was “Familia, Cultura, Herencia: Cultivating The Legacy Of Hispanic Nursing Excellence and Transforming The Health Of Our Communities.”

=== Scholarships and Awards Recognition ===
NAHN awards academic scholarships to active members enrolled in accredited nursing programs (LVN/LPN, associate, bachelor's, or graduate level). NAHN scholarships are awarded annually with varying amounts. NAHN has collaborated with strategic partners, educational partners, sponsors, corporate members, and corporate board members to over more than $200,000 in nursing scholarships. Several scholarships dedicated to supporting diversity in research, such as the Abbott Scholars Award. Another unique scholarship for NAHN members pursuing a PhD in Nursing is the Aguilar-Cuellar-Toben (ACT) Research Grant award, granted to PhD students conducting either qualitative or quantitative research and who have advanced their project, as approved by the dissertation committee. Special awards are distributed annually, and the current awards are as follows:

Latino Legacy Award

Nurse of the Year Award

Henrietta Villaescusa Community Service Award

Janie Menchaca Wilson Leadership Award

Ildaura Murillo-Rohde Award for Education Excellence: Griselle Batista, PhD, RN, CTN-A

Sarah Gomez Erlach Humanitarian Award

President's Award

Sigma Theta Tau Award

The Daisy Award for NAHN Chapters Advancing Health Equity: NAHN Michigan Chapter

The Daisy Award for NAHN Nurses Advancing Health Equity

Ambassador Award

== Community partnerships ==
NAHN plays a role in connecting communities and healthcare professionals to Hispanic/Latino health issues; raising awareness and support for effective health policy and programs; promoting the nursing profession among Hispanics; and expanding community‐based interventions. One way they are engaging is through partnerships with other healthcare organizations, like the American Red Cross. In a recent announcement, the American Red Cross is partnering with NAHN to expand Latino health Outreach. “We look forward to growing our partnership with the Red Cross in our shared mission of promoting health education within our Hispanic communities,” said NAHN President Veronica Vital, PhD, MSN, MLS, RN. "Through this partnership, we can empower our communities to donate blood and save lives."

Nahn has partnered with the Alzheimer's Association to increase education and community outreach to Hispanic communities and increase awareness of Alzheimer's disease. In 2025, the memories of My Grandfather, a "telenovela," and the debut and screening were marketed by both the Alzheimer's Association and NAHN via social media, email campaigns, and on their respective websites.
