= Gold roll =

The gold roll and the silver roll were racially coded payroll categories of workers employed by the U.S. builders of the Panama Canal.

After the U.S. revival in 1904 of the abandoned French-led canal construction project, skilled workers and management staff were recruited almost exclusively from the United States. By contract, these U.S. employees were paid in gold-backed U.S. dollars. Unskilled labor was variously sourced, but the great majority of laborers were West Indians; their wages were paid in local silver-backed currency. Wages were disbursed from separate payroll windows to employees in the two categories, and their social lives (in respect of housing, recreation, transportation, and health services, for example) were also organized around this distinction. Even post offices featured segregated gold-roll and silver-roll sections.

The system evolved out of less rigid racial practices under the American-owned Panama Railroad and the earlier French-led canal effort. But the system was gradually tightened up specifically to enforce racial segregationist policies. This process took place between 1905 and 1908 under Chief Engineer John Stevens and his successor, George Washington Goethals, and even played a role in the U.S. presidential election of 1908. Skilled workers from the West Indies were demoted to the silver roll. The gold roll was explicitly limited to U.S. and Panamanian citizens by order of U.S. Secretary of War William Howard Taft during his 1908 presidential campaign, in response to demands by American labor unions. A small number of black American citizens were also employed on the gold roll but were denied gold roll privileges. In response to their protests, the canal authorities stopped hiring black U.S. citizens. Hardly any black American citizens remained on the canal workforce after 1909.
