= Antonia M. Villarruel =

American nurse

Academic background
- Education: BSN, 1978, Nazareth College; MSN, 1982, University of Pennsylvania School of Nursing; PhD, 1993, Wayne State University
- Thesis: Mexican-American cultural meanings, expressions, self-care and dependent-care actions associated with experiences of pain (1993)

Academic work
- Institutions: University of Pennsylvania School of Nursing; University of Michigan School of Nursing

Antonia M. Villarruel is an American nurse. She has served as the Margaret Simon Bond Dean of Nursing at the University of Pennsylvania School of Nursing since 2014.

== Early life and education ==
Villarruel was born into a Mexican–American family. Her grandparents had come to the United States and began their family in Michigan. Her mother Doña Amalia was a Detroit-born Mexican American while her father, Don Francisco, immigrated from Mexico at the age of 16. Her parents limited her career choice to teaching and nursing—with Villarruel choosing the latter. As such, she completed her Bachelor of Nursing degree from Nazareth College before working at the Children's Hospital of Michigan. During her time at CHM, she co-developed a tool to help children describe their pain level to medical personnel and improve management of children’s pain. She then enrolled at the University of Pennsylvania School of Nursing for her Master's degree. Following this, she earned her PhD at Wayne State University in 1993.

== Career ==
=== University of Michigan ===
Following her PhD, Villarruel returned to her alma mater, the University of Pennsylvania School of Nursing, as a professor from 1995 to 2000. She then joined the faculty at the University of Michigan as an associate professor of nursing. In this role, she was appointed director of the Center for Health Promotion and served on the Secretary’s Advisory Committee on Minority Health of the United States Department of Health and Human Services. By 2007, Villarruel was a founding member and vice president of the National Coalition of Ethnic Minority Nursing Associations and former president of the National Association of Hispanic Nurses. As a result of her efforts to reduce medical disparities, she was elected a Member of the National Academy of Medicine (then referred to as the Institute of Medicine).

By 2013, Villarruel was serving as the Associate Dean for Research and Global Affairs and Nola J. Pender Collegiate Chair at the University of Michigan School of Nursing. As such, Villarruel was appointed to the Institute of Medicine's Roundtable on the Promotion of Health Equity and the Elimination of Health Disparities.

=== University of Pennsylvania ===
In July 2014, Villarruel left the University of Michigan to return to the University of Pennsylvania as the Margaret Simon Bond Dean of Nursing. In her first six years, she launched the Doctor of Nursing Practice program and established a formal Academic Practice Partnership with the Perelman School of Medicine at the University of Pennsylvania. In 2020, she was re-appointed the Margaret Simon Bond Dean of Nursing. Following her re-appointment, she also received the Global Philadelphia Association Award for her "international significant achievements."

During the COVID-19 pandemic, Villarruel was announced as the chair of the National Academy of Medicine’s Culture of Health program. On May 6, 2021, Villarruel received the Ohtli Award from the Government of Mexico in recognition of her health care efforts. She was also appointed the co-investigator of the Philadelphia Community Engagement Alliance Against COVID-19 Disparities sponsored by the National Institutes of Health (NIH). In September 2021, Villarruel received the Health Care Leader Award from the American Academy of Nursing in recognition of "her incredible impact in shaping health policy."
