= Black Solidarity Day =

Black Solidarity Day is a memorial day, created in 1969 by Panamanian-American, activist, historian, and playwright Carlos E. Russell. It was inspired by the fictional play “Day of Absence” by Douglas Turner Ward. It is annually observed the day before Election Day in November, the first Monday of the month. Its purpose is for African diasporic people to exercise a 24- hour moratorium from shopping or participating in other commercial activity such as using the transit system. The Pan-African ideal of the observance is to highlight racial inequality and the gap between the wealthiest of one of the most powerful nations in the world and those living in poverty.

In the early years of its observance, Black Solidarity Day was a means of unifying many of the New York City Communities to show their economic power, with school closings and cultural events. It is still celebrated in pockets amongst African American and Caribbean neighborhoods. Part of its purpose is to show that the spending power of communities of color has an impact on the economy.

It is recognized and observed in higher education.

== History ==
Three Brooklyn school districts closed for Black Solidarity Day in 1971. This included 87 schools in Bedford-Stuyvesant, Brooklyn Heights, Ocean Hill-Brownsville, Crown Heights, and Flatbush communities, with significantly reduced attendance across New York City schools despite the Board of Education not officially recognizing the holiday. The Department of Corrections allowed inmates in 22 institutions time off for religious observances, musical programs, and speeches. Eleanor Holmes Norton, then chairman of the City Commission on Human Rights, advocated for increased economic power in Black communities and the development of more Black professionals, while cautioning against over-reliance on government support and the term "Black capitalism" in a speech.

In 1973, thirty-nine public schools across two Brooklyn school districts (District 13 in Brooklyn Heights and Bedford-Stuyvesant, and District 16 in Ridgewood) closed to observe the day, despite Board of Education directives warning of potential state aid losses for unauthorized closings. The observance encouraged Black individuals to stay home from work and school, with activities such as a gathering at Russell's Brooklyn home, where approximately 50 people discussed Black history and politics. While the number of Black students absent citywide was not immediately determined, the Board of Education indicated that only districts that ordered closings would face financial assessments.

In 1974, it was reported by The New York Times that there was significant student and worker absenteeism. The event had expanded beyond New York City, with Russell receiving inquiries from San Francisco, though he chose not to actively promote the day with buttons or posters.

During the 1979 observance, hundreds of demonstrators marched through Harlem and Manhattan's East Side to Dag Hammarskjold Plaza, briefly occupying the United Nations' visitors' entrance to elevate their concerns to an international level. The protesters presented demands to UN Secretary General Kurt Waldheim, including calls for investigations into rights violations in prisons, recognition of needs for healthcare and housing, and examination of alleged human rights violations by the U.S. government. While organizers estimated up to 3,000 participants attended the demonstration, which featured speakers from locations including Cairo, Illinois, discussing challenges facing Black Americans.
