= Ildaura Murillo-Rohde =

Panamanian nurse and academic (1920–2010)

- Born: September 6, 1920; Panama
- Died: September 5, 2010 (aged 89); Panama
- Education: Columbia University; New York University
- Occupations: Nurse, professor
- Known for: Founder, National Association of Hispanic Nurses

Ildaura Murillo-Rohde (September 6, 1920 – September 5, 2010) was a Panamanian nurse, professor, academic, tennis instructor, and organizational administrator. She founded the National Association of Hispanic Nurses in 1975.

Murillo-Rohde specialized in psychiatric nursing and held academic appointments at several universities. She was a World Health Organization consultant to the government of Taiwan and was named a Permanent UN Representative to UNICEF for the International Federation of Business and Professional Women.

She was named a Living Legend of the American Academy of Nursing in 1994.

== Early life ==
Ildaura Murillo-Rohde was born on September 6, 1920, in Panama. She came to the United States in 1945 and enrolled in the US Nurse Cadet Corps. She completed a nursing diploma from the Medical and Surgical Hospital School of Nursing in 1948. She earned an undergraduate degree in the teaching and supervision of psychiatric nursing from Teachers College, Columbia University. She earned an MA in teaching and curriculum development and an MEd in education and administration, both from Columbia. In 1971, Murillo-Rohde was the first Hispanic nurse awarded a PhD from New York University (NYU). A psychiatric nurse by training, she was acutely aware of how cultural nuances impacted mental health care. She quickly distinguished herself as a nurse, educator, a leader, and advocate.

Her leadership extended beyond NAHN; she served as a dean, a U.S. Permanent Representative to UNICEF, and a relentless voice for Hispanic health equity.

== Career ==
Murillo-Rohde was dedicated to the Hispanic population in her work as a psychiatric nurse and focused on cultural awareness in nursing practice. In her article Family Life Among Mainland Puerto Ricans in New York City Slums, she stressed that there could be a “culture within a culture” and that a nurse must know each culture well in order to provide the best care.

Murillo-Rohde became an associate dean at the University of Washington and was the first Hispanic nursing dean at NYU. The pivotal moment came in 1974 when Dr. Ildaura Murillo-Rohde led the cause for the establishment of a Hispanic nursing caucaus within the American Nurses Association (ANA) as a platform to focus on the distinct needs of Hispanic nurses and the communities they served. The ANA refused Murillo-Rohde's proposal which led her and a small group of Hispanic nurse members to break away from the organization and create the National Spanish-Speaking/Spanish Surnamed Nurses. This organization created a national entity devoted to empowering Hispanic nurses and improve culturally competent healthcare.

“We could no longer accept being sidelined. We needed a unified voice—one that spoke both for Hispanic nurses and the communities we served,”

By 1979, the organization was renamed the National Association of Hispanic Nurses (NAHN)—a title that reflected both its expanding influence and its inclusive mission to represent all nurses of Hispanic heritage, regardless of national origin. In 1991, David Dinkins appointed Murillo-Rohde to a commission that examined the quality of care at New York City hospitals. In 1994, she was named a Living Legend of the American Academy of Nursing.

== Death ==
Murillo-Rohde died in Panama on September 5, 2010, one day before her 90th birthday.

== Legacy ==
NAHN awards a scholarship and an educational excellence award in her honor. To mark the start of National Hispanic Heritage Month for 2021, the Google Doodle for September 15, 2021 pays homage to Dr. Murillo-Rohde.

== See also ==
- List of Living Legends of the American Academy of Nursing
