= Rise Against Hunger =

American non-profit organization

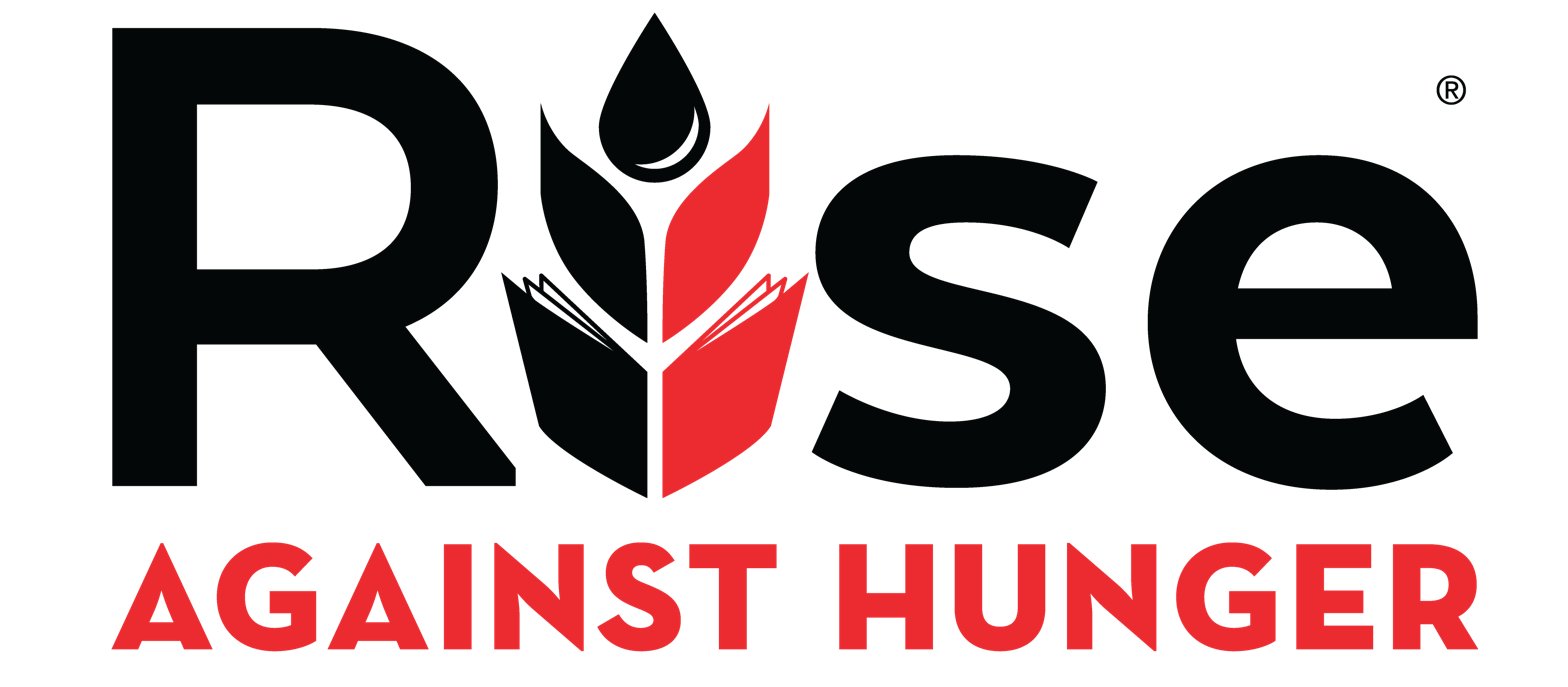
- Formation: 1998; 28 years ago
- Legal status: 501(c)(3)
- Headquarters: Raleigh, North Carolina, United States
- Region served: 76 countries
- Website: riseagainsthunger.org

Rise Against Hunger is an international hunger relief non-profit organization that coordinates the packaging and distribution of food and other aid to people in developing nations. It was founded as Stop Hunger Now in 1998 by Ray Buchanan and John Hewitt. Rise Against Hunger mobilizes more than 400,000 volunteers each year to package meals for people in need around the globe.

== History ==
Rise Against Hunger was formed as Stop Hunger Now in 1998 by Ray Buchanan, a United Methodist Minister, and John Hewitt, a tax expert and entrepreneur. It aims to end global hunger by engaging local volunteers. The organization began its meal packaging program in 2005. The organizational mission is stated as: "Rise Against Hunger is driven by the vision of a world without hunger. [Its] mission is to end hunger in our lifetime by providing food and life-changing aid to the world’s most vulnerable and creating a global commitment to mobilize the necessary resources."

== Areas of focus ==
Rise Against Hunger aims to end hunger through four pathways: nourishing lives, responding to emergencies, empowering communities, and growing the movement.

=== Nourishing lives ===
Rise Against Hunger supports safety net programs for nourishment and skills training to help the world's most vulnerable navigate the difficult journey out of poverty. Rise Against Hunger partners with schools to promote and incentivize increased attendance. Additionally, Rise Against Hunger works to partner with vocational education and clinics in order to support adults learning new trades and encourage healthy lifestyles.

=== Responding to emergencies ===
Rise Against Hunger responds to emergencies. In times of floods, droughts, or political unrest, the organization aims to provide food. Access to food, wages, and market systems are often destroyed in times of emergency. Rise Against Hunger works with its in-country partner organizations to address the immediate needs in the wake of crisis. Each year Rise Against Hunger reserves 10% of its projected meals to respond to crisis situations. Official Rise Against Hunger responses include Hurricane Dorian in 2019, the Venezuelan refugee crisis, Hurricanes Harvey and Irma in 2017, 2016 Hurricane Matthew, the Syrian conflict, the South Sudanese conflict and the 2010 Haiti earthquake.

=== Empowering communities ===
In order to create long-term solutions to hunger and poverty, Rise Against Hunger works to empower communities through agricultural and income-generating initiatives. It works to increase agricultural production and incomes through programs that promote improved farming methods, business skills, and market access. Farmers, one of the most food-insecure populations in the world, are given access to quality seeds and fertilizers to increase agricultural production and diversify their crops. Rise Against Hunger supports vocational training to help at-risk individuals increase their earning potential and gain consistent access to food.

=== Growing the movement ===
Part of Rise Against Hunger's mission is to create a global commitment to mobilize the necessary resources to end hunger. The organization works with volunteer groups from communities of faith, corporations, schools, and civic clubs to package meals while developing a greater awareness of hunger-related issues. Additionally, Rise Against Hunger encourages its supporters to participate in advocacy activities to work toward changing laws, policies, systems and attitudes to end hunger by 2030.

== Meal packaging program ==
The assembly process combines rice, soy, dehydrated vegetables, and a micronutrient flavoring mix formulated by Kraft Heinz Company Foundation that includes 20 essential vitamins and minerals. The cost of each meal is typically 34 cents. The food has a shelf-life of two years. Rise Against Hunger provides over 70% of its meals to support development programs such as school lunch programs, vocational training programs, early childhood development programs, orphanages, and medical clinics. Working with these programs allow beneficiaries to break the cycle of poverty through education, skills development, and healthcare while also receiving needed nutrition.

== Grant program ==
Rise Against Hunger supports partner organizations in developing countries by providing direct financial assistance to support ongoing programs that provide food, medicines, or other basic necessities to impoverished populations. This program enables Rise Against Hunger to respond to crises immediately by working with organizations already on the ground. It also supports local economies in developing areas and promotes self-reliance.
