= Northeast Airlines Flight 285 =

1957 aviation accident

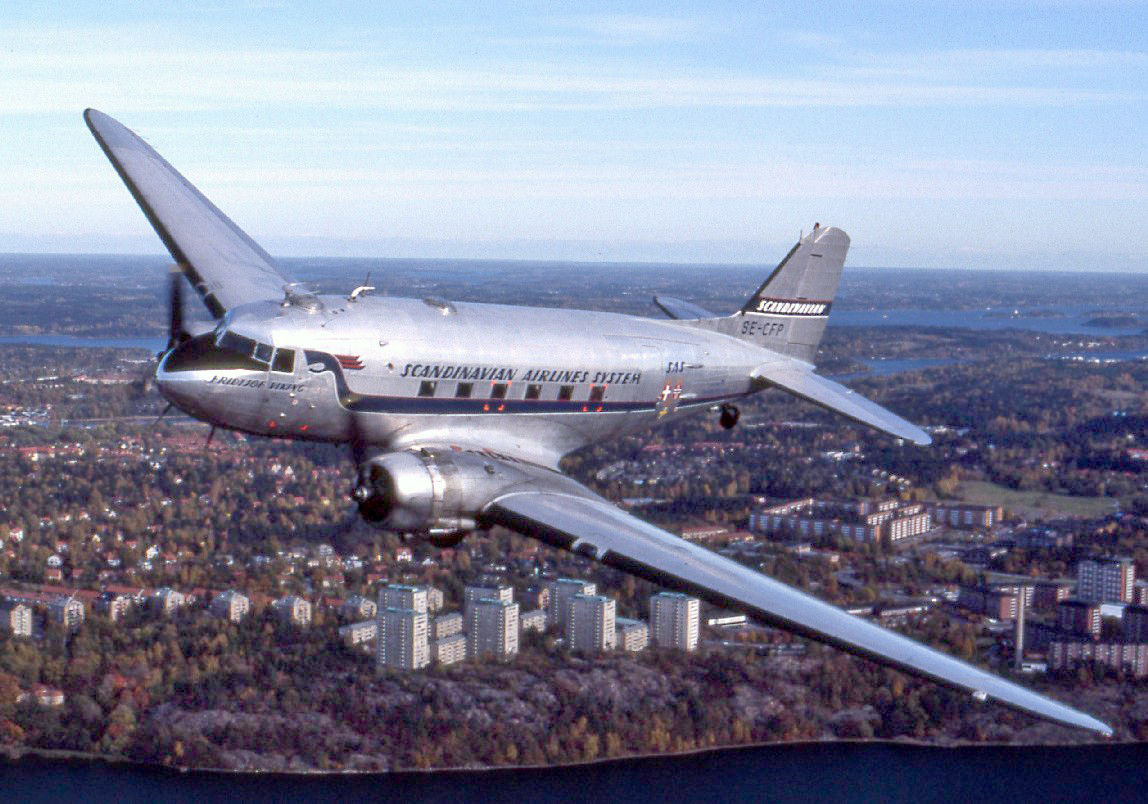
- A Douglas DC-3 in flight

Accident
- Date: September 15, 1957
- Summary: Premature descent due to incorrect perception caused by fog
- Site: Near New Bedford Regional Airport, Massachusetts; 41°39′42″N 70°58′22″W

Aircraft
- Aircraft type: Douglas DC-3
- Operator: Northeast Airlines
- Registration: N34417
- Flight origin: Martha's Vineyard Airport
- Destination: New Bedford Regional Airport
- Passengers: 21
- Crew: 3
- Fatalities: 12
- Injuries: 12
- Survivors: 12

Northeast Airlines Flight 285 was a scheduled domestic passenger flight from Boston's Logan International Airport to New York's LaGuardia Airport with stops in Hyannis, Nantucket, Martha's Vineyard, and New Bedford that crashed on September 15, 1957, while trying to land at New Bedford. Seven passengers and two crew members were killed in the crash and three passengers later died from injuries. It was Northeast Airlines' second fatal crash of the year (the first was Flight 823) and was followed by another deadly crash (Flight 258) the following year.

== Flight ==
The flight, which carried freight, mail, and passengers, departed from Boston for Hyannis at 5:50 p.m. with 21 passengers on board. The aircraft, a Douglas DC-3, departed Hyannis at 6:35 p.m. for Nantucket. It left Nantucket at 7:30 p.m. for Martha's Vineyard. The plane missed its first landing approach at Martha's Vineyard due to poor weather conditions, but landed safely on the second approach at 8:07 p.m. All of the original passengers deplaned at these stops. Seven new passengers boarded at Nantucket and fourteen more boarded at Martha's Vineyard. At 8:18 p.m., the plane, which was 50 minutes behind schedule, took off from Martha's Vineyard for New Bedford, where one passenger was scheduled to get off. The rest were bound for the flight's final stop at LaGuardia.

== Crash ==
Around 8:45 p.m., the plane made a normal approach to the field. On its final approach to New Bedford, it smashed a 400-foot (120 m) path through trees and went down about 4,000 feet (1,200 m) short of the runway, in the Apponegansett Swamp. A number of Catholic priests made their way through the swamp to administer spiritual care to the victims.

== Investigations ==
Both the Civil Aeronautics Board (CAB) and the Massachusetts Aeronautics Commission (MAC) investigated the crash. The MAC released its report on September 30, 1957. It found the most probable reason for the crash was a "loss of visual reference during the final visual phase of an instrument approach, due to weather conditions." According to the report, at the time of the crash the ceiling at the airport was 200 feet (61 m) and there was visibility of one-half mile (0.80 km).

The CAB determined that the probable cause of the accident to be premature descent by the pilot in the approach area without adherence to the instrument landing system approach dictated by existing weather conditions in an attempt to make a visual approach. They found that Flight 285 had descended prematurely and to a low and unsafe altitude in an attempt to approach the airport visually. It did not conform to the ILS glide path, flying nearly 189 feet (58 m) below the glide path centerline and 165 feet (50 m) to the right of the localizer centerline. A descent occurred which was not recognized by the pilots in time for corrective action, resulted in the plane striking trees and crashing about 4,000 feet (1,200 m) short of the runway threshold.

== See also ==
- List of disasters in Massachusetts by death toll
