= Edward F. Knapp State Airport =

General aviation airport located in Berlin, Vermont

Coordinates: 44°12′13″N 072°33′44″W

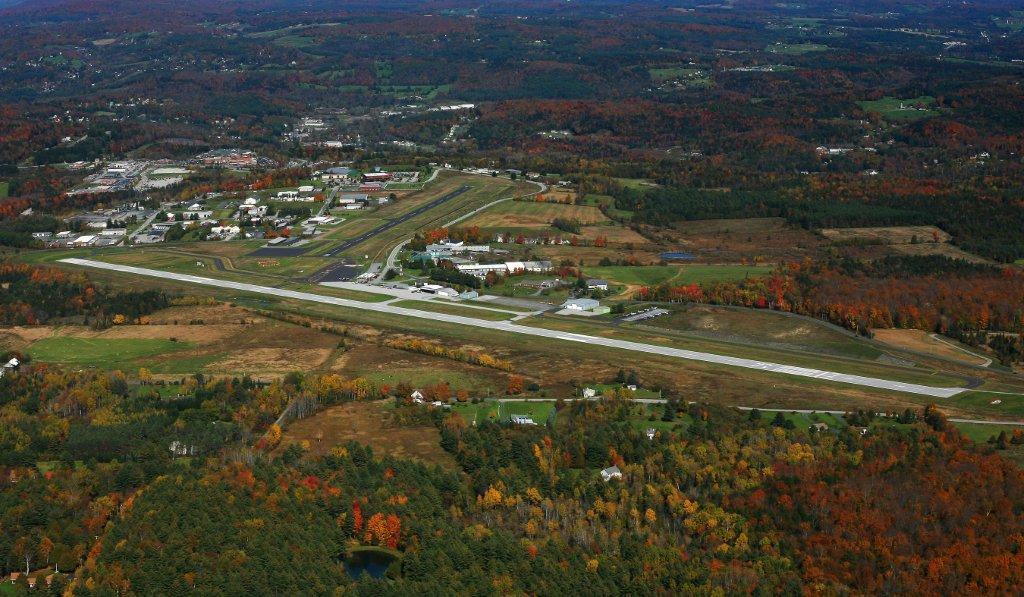
- IATA: MPV; ICAO: KMPV; FAA LID: MPV

Summary
- Airport type: Public
- Owner: State of Vermont
- Serves: Barre / Montpelier
- Location: Berlin, Vermont
- Opened: August 5, 1929
- Passenger services ceased: March 10, 1989
- Elevation AMSL: 1,165 ft (355 m)
- Website: aviation.vermont.gov/airports/efknapp

Map
- Interactive map of Edward F. Knapp State Airport

Runways
Direction	Length		Surface
Direction	ft	m	Surface
17/35	5,002	1,525	Asphalt
5/23	3,000	914	Asphalt

Statistics (2018)
- Aircraft operations: 10,500
- Based aircraft: 51
- Source: Federal Aviation Administration

Edward F. Knapp State Airport (IATA: MPV, ICAO: KMPV, FAA LID: MPV) is a general aviation airport located in Berlin, Vermont, United States; it is located three miles (5 km) west of the central business district of Barre. It serves both Barre and the Montpelier region. It currently has no scheduled airline service, but the airport was formerly served by Northeast Airlines and Air New England.

The airport completed a major construction project in April 2010, constructing a new taxiway, as well as repaving the runway and expanding the apron near the terminal area. The $6.2 million project was funded by the American Recovery and Reinvestment Act of 2009.

== History ==
=== Construction ===
Originally called the Barre-Montpelier Airport, land was purchased on April 5, 1929 and construction proceeded throughout the rest of the year. At the time of its construction, the airport was a primitive field with a grass surface. Depending on the wind, planes could take off in any direction. For its earlier years, this worked well, but as larger planes started to use the airport, longer paved runways became a necessity. In October 1935, the field was sold to the municipalities of Barre and Montpelier. Using government money from the Works Progress Administration, the new field was constructed in 1936. The two paved runways, designed by Thurman Dix, Barre City Engineer, and George Reed, Montpelier City Engineer, were 2200 ft. long and 100 ft. wide. The total cost of the project was $95,000.

=== Early development ===
On April 10, 1941, construction began on a project funded by the Works Progress Administration and the Civil Aeronautics Administration to bring the airport to a standard for national defense purposes. The airport now had two 4000’ x 150’ paved runways, with the designations 17/35 and 5/23. The total cost of the improvements was over $550,000. In a separate project in 1941, runway lights were added, as well as obstruction lights in the nearby fields. In 1956, Runway 17/35 was lengthened by 500’ at the southern end.

=== Acquisition by the State and later development ===
In 1968, the State of Vermont offered to take over the Barre-Montpelier Airport. The municipalities agreed to the deal, as they would reap the benefits of improved facilities at no cost to them. On March 17, 1970, a ceremony was held to officially recognize that the state now owned and ran the airport. Governor Deane Davis spoke about plans for future expansion and development. At the end of his speech, Davis announced the name for the Barre-Montpelier Airport was now the Edward F. Knapp State Airport, named after the Commissioner of Aeronautics. In 1971, the runway was lengthened again, to its final length of 5000’, in a project costing $245,000. In 2001, Capitol Earthmoving was contracted in a project, which included: reconstruction of the subbase and drainage of 17/35, the removal of the 150’ wide pavement of 17/25, and repaving it 100’ wide, along with the construction of a new taxi ramp. The cost of the project was $3,500,000. In 2009, federal stimulus funds paid for a parallel taxiway for 17/35 and reconstruction of 5/23. Runway 5/23 was shortened, so that it no longer intersected with 17/35. Incidental construction included a new jet apron, new lighting, and construction of stormwater retention ponds. The project, completed by Pike Industries, cost a total of $6,879,000. This project brought runway 17 into compliance with FAA and Vermont standards for airports with precision approach runways.

=== Operation ===
When the Barre-Montpelier Airport opened, Vermont Airways moved their operations from Derby, and became the first flying service at the airport. In 1931, a series of accidents forced Vermont Airways to close and, on July 6, 1931, Emery Davis became the field manager. In 1934, Davis left and Jack Dories took over as manager until 1938. In anticipation of the second world war and the need for pilots, the Government created the Civilian Pilot Training Program (CPTP). A twenty student unit was founded at Norwich University and the students flew out of the Barre-Montpelier Airport. Howard Dutton, who had been operating a flight school, called the Green Mountain Airways School of Aviation, took over airport management in 1939. At the end of 1939, Dutton left to pursue aerobatics, and Airways Incorporated, which managed other airports in the state, maintained the flying school, but by the end of 1941, Bugbee Flying Service took over management. In 1942, East Coast Airways moved operations to the airport and took control of the management of the field. In 1944, the flight training operations of East Coast Airways slowed and two former instructors, Edmando Roberti and Dick Mc-Gillicuddy, created the Vermont Flying Service. The company was incorporated in 1946 and, by 1948, Roberti had taken over. When Edmando died in 1985, his sons Dick and John took over operation.

=== Former airline service ===
Airline service began at the Barre-Montpelier Airport on October 22, 1933, serviced by National Airways. Amelia Earhart, a partner in the company, flew the route of the Boston Maine Airways, landing at the Barre-Montpelier Airport, to promote commercial air travel for their business. In 1934, National Airways was given the airmail contract for northern New England. On November 6, 1940, Boston-Maine Airways bought out National Airways, and became Northeast Airways, flying regularly into Barre-Montpelier. As the airport expanded in size, more airlines flew into Barre-Montpelier, including Terry Air Transport, New England Air Service, Executive Airlines, Air New England, Green Mountain Airways., and Precision Airways. In 1981, when Air New England went out of business, Precision Airways was the only airline that flew into and out of E. F. Knapp State Airport. They serviced the airport until the end of 1989. Air Vermont also provided service in the mid-1980s. Since 1989, the only commercial carrier operating out of E. F. Knapp State Airport is Wiggins Airways, which carries air freight for UPS.

== Facilities and aircraft ==
Edward F. Knapp State Airport covers an area of 259 acres (105 ha) which contains two asphalt paved runways: 17/35 measuring 5,002 x 100 ft (1,525 x 30 m) and 5/23 measuring 3,000 x 75 ft (914 x 23 m).

For the 12-month period ending June 30, 2018, the airport had 10,500 aircraft operations, an average of 29 per day: 90% general aviation, 5% air taxi and 5% military. There are 51 aircraft based at this airport: 48 single-engine, 2 multi-engine and 1 helicopter.

Vermont Flying Service is the only FBO at the airport.

Ameriflight carries overnight air freight for UPS out of the airport.

== See also ==
- List of airports in Vermont
