= Northeast Airlines =

Airline of the United States (1933–1972)

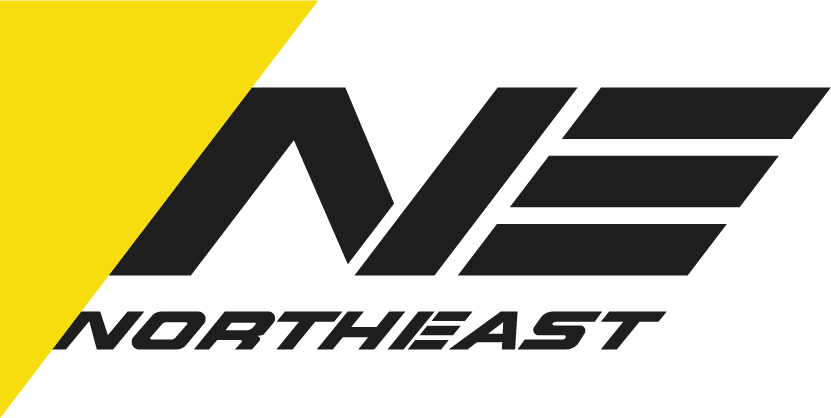

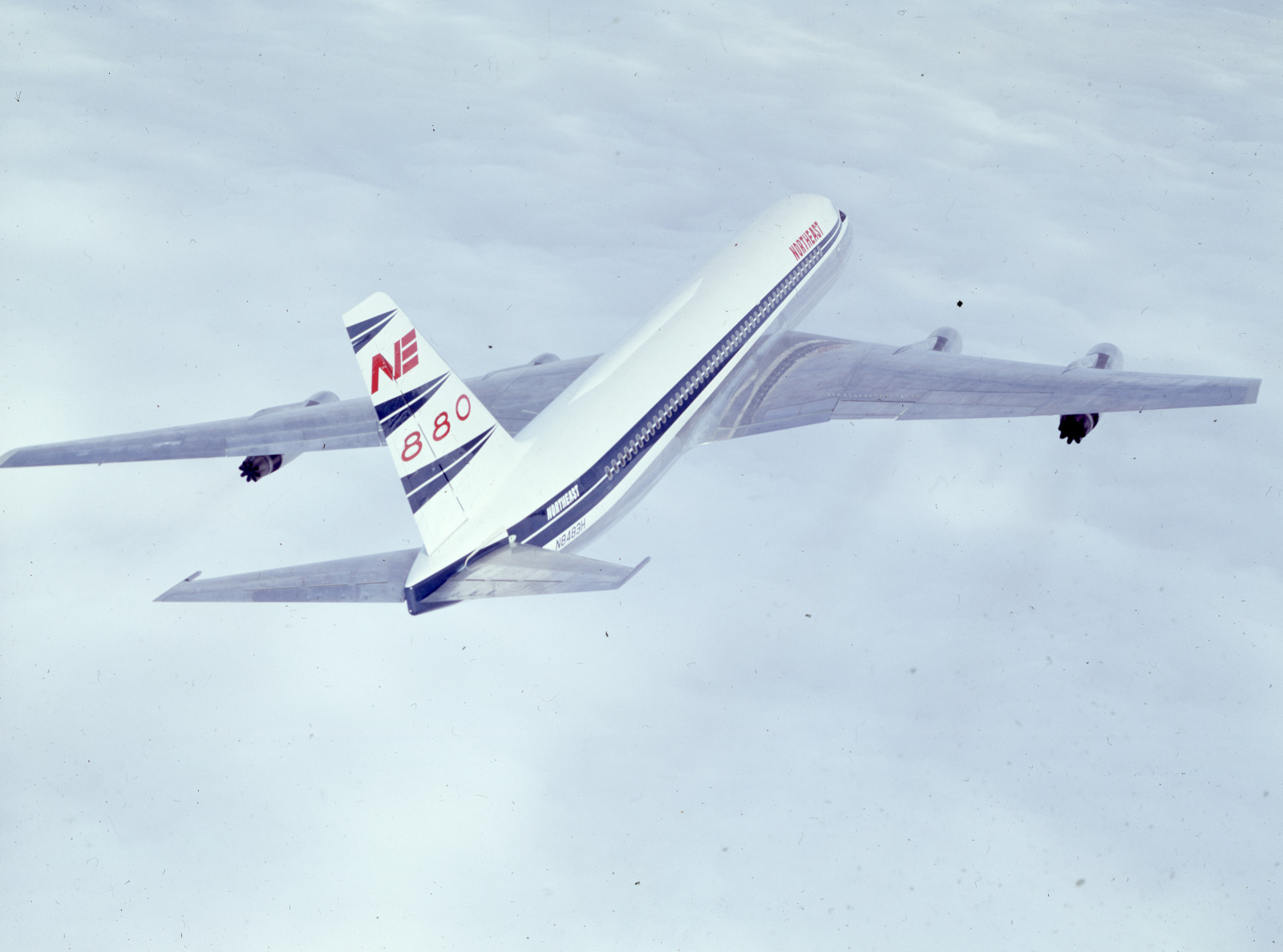
- Convair 880
IATA	ICAO	Call sign
NE	NEA	NORTHEAST
- Founded: July 20, 1931 (as Boston-Maine Airways)
- Commenced operations: August 11, 1933 (as Boston-Maine Airways)
- Ceased operations: August 1, 1972 (merged into Delta Air Lines)
- Operating bases: Boston; New York–JFK
- Destinations: See Destinations
- Parent company: Storer Broadcasting (1965–1972)
- Headquarters: Boston, Massachusetts
- Founders: Amelia Earhart; Eugene Luther Vidal

Northeast Airlines was a trunk carrier, a scheduled airline based in Boston, Massachusetts, originally founded in 1931 as Boston-Maine Airways that chiefly operated in the Northeastern United States, and later to Canada, Florida, the Bahamas, Bermuda and other cities. It was notably small and unprofitable relative to other trunk carriers, being less than half the size, by revenue, than the next biggest trunk in 1971. Northeast was acquired by and merged into Delta Air Lines in August 1972.

From 1975 onward, Air New England was essentially a reincarnation of many of the New England routes of Northeast Airlines, complete with the aircraft Northeast used to fly those routes and Northeast's IATA code.

== History ==
=== Early days and certification ===
The airline began as Boston-Maine Airways, founded as a Pan Am contract carrier on July 20, 1931, by the Boston and Maine Railroad and Maine Central Railroad, flying from Boston to Bangor via Portland. It flew only sporadically until August 11, 1933, when National Airways began to operate its flights under contract. National also operated Central Vermont Airways, a subsidiary of the Central Vermont Railway, and the two carriers together had a network across New England to New Hampshire, Vermont, and Montreal. Amelia Earhart and Eugene Vidal were among the co-founders of National, and Earhart was a prominent salesperson for the airline in its early years. National initially operated Stinson Airliners, and switched to a fleet of 10-passenger Lockheed Electras in November 1936.

On May 31, 1939, Boston-Maine was certificated to be a United States scheduled airline by the Civil Aeronautics Authority (CAA) under the terms of the Civil Aeronautics Act of 1938, which granted certificates to airlines that had been providing bona fide scheduled service prior to the Act. The CAA noted that Boston-Maine was 25% owned each by the Boston and Maine Railroad and Maine Central Railroads. The next year, the airline regulatory functions of the CAA would be moved to the Civil Aeronautics Board (CAB), which would closely regulate Boston-Maine/Northeast as a trunk carrier for the rest of its existence.

=== New name, World War II and jets ===
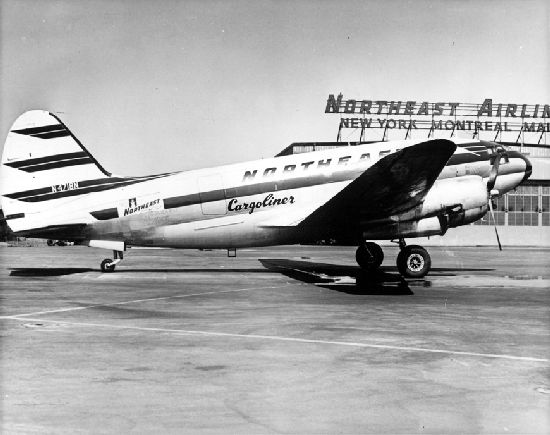
Curtiss C-46 Cargoliner

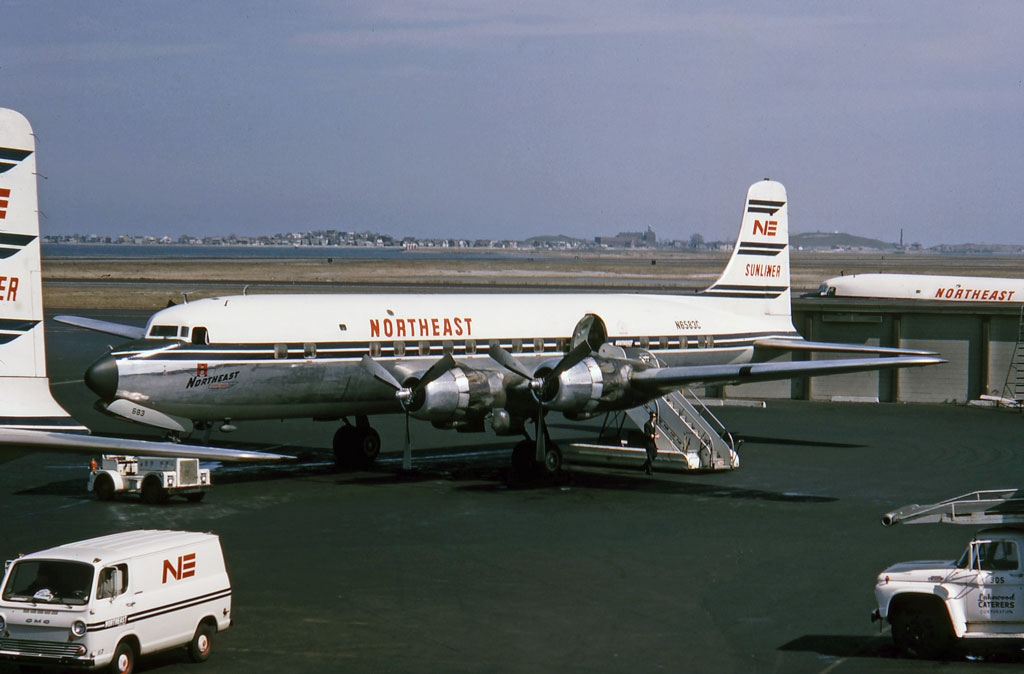
DC-6B at Boston 1966

The name Northeast Airlines was adopted on November 19, 1940, which was duly approved by the CAB, including the required signature of President Franklin D. Roosevelt. During World War II Northeast pioneered transatlantic service for the military under contract from the U.S. Army Air Forces. In June 1944, the CAB approved the takeover of moribund Mayflower Airlines, giving Northeast routes to Cape Cod, Nantucket and Martha's Vineyard from Boston. After the war, Northeast began hourly service between Boston and New York using DC-4s. Northeast applied for authorization to operate passenger service across the Atlantic but were stymied by the Civil Aeronautics Board, which in June 1945 awarded the routes to Pan American World Airways, American Export Airlines and TWA.

In 1956 Northeast began service to Washington National Airport, and received a temporary certificate to serve Florida, for which the airline purchased a fleet of new DC-6Bs. Northeast ordered ten Vickers Viscounts in the late 1950s and used them until financial problems in the early 1960s forced the company to return them to the manufacturer. Beginning on December 17, 1959, Northeast became one of the early jet operators, flying a leased TWA Boeing 707-331 round trip between New York and Miami. In 1960 Northeast leased six Convair 880s and flew them to Florida for several years.

=== Last turbulent decade ===
Howard Hughes acquired control of the airline in 1962. The airline's temporary Miami route authority was terminated by a CAB decision that year, and Hughes decided to exit from the company, selling control to a trustee in 1964. Northeast launched an aggressive campaign against the CAB's decision, and got a permanent Florida certificate in 1965. In 1965 the airline was bought by Storer Broadcasting, who tried to rejuvenate Northeast in 1966 with a new marketing campaign and new aircraft. Northeast ordered a fleet of Boeing 727-100s for their Florida routes, and McDonnell Douglas DC-9-30s and Fairchild-Hiller FH-227s for shorter routes. These "Yellowbirds" featured a new yellow and white livery. In 1966 Northeast was the launch customer for the Boeing 727-200, which they began flying in December 1967. Except for Florida their network was all north and east of Washington National Airport until 1969 when they added three 727 nonstops between Miami and Los Angeles, with Fort Lauderdale getting a short-lived LAX nonstop soon after (fuel stops were sometimes required on these transcontinental 727 flights). Northeast obtained rights to fly between Miami and Montreal in 1967, followed by rights to serve the Bahamas in 1968, and rights to serve Cleveland, Detroit, Chicago, and Bermuda in 1969, along with a new Miami-Los Angeles route authority.

Northeast Airlines Financial Results, 1962 thru 1971
USD mm	1962	1963	1964	1965	1966	1967	1968	1969	1970	1971
Op revenue	51.39	43.91	42.70	48.21	62.27	78.58	111.71	122.09	122.84	126.00
Of which subsidy		0.99	3.44	3.63	2.20	2.82				
Op profit (loss)	(6.36)	(8.64)	(0.99)	0.21	0.43	(3.03)	0.86	(17.07)	(4.70)	(8.84)
Net profit (loss)	(8.24)	(15.30)	2.88	0.47	0.13	(6.53)	(2.42)	(28.84)	(10.72)	(13.99)
Op margin	-12.4%	-19.7%	-2.3%	0.4%	0.7%	-3.9%	0.8%	-14.0%	-3.8%	-7.0%
Net margin	-16.0%	-34.8%	6.7%	1.0%	0.2%	-8.3%	-2.2%	-23.6%	-8.7%	-11.1%
Subsidy/op revenue		2.2%	8.0%	7.5%	3.5%	3.6%				

Northeast was the runt of the trunks. In 1971, the largest local service carrier, Allegheny Airlines, had operating revenue over 40% bigger than that of Northeast, while the next smallest trunk, National, had significantly more than twice as much revenue. The largest trunk, United, had revenue over twelve times that of Northeast. As George C. Eads said about Northeast in his definitive book on local service carriers (the next tier of airlines down from the trunks in the CAB's categorization of airlines), "Although classified as a trunk, since it was certificated under the grandfather provisions of the Civil Aeronautics Act, it has always resembled a local service carrier with a few trunk routes appended." Like Local Service Carriers, Northeast needed government subsidies. Despite subsidies, it had a long history of incredibly poor financial results (see nearby table). Some of that had to do with its route network, as Eads said. But some of it was self-inflicted. In 1968 Northeast, for some reason, ordered eight Lockheed L-1011s which were to be delivered in a 268-seat configuration. The total order was to cost $128 million including spares. In early 1970, following another abysmal set of financial results in 1969, Northeast cancelled the order, taking a $3.6 million charge against 1969 to do so.

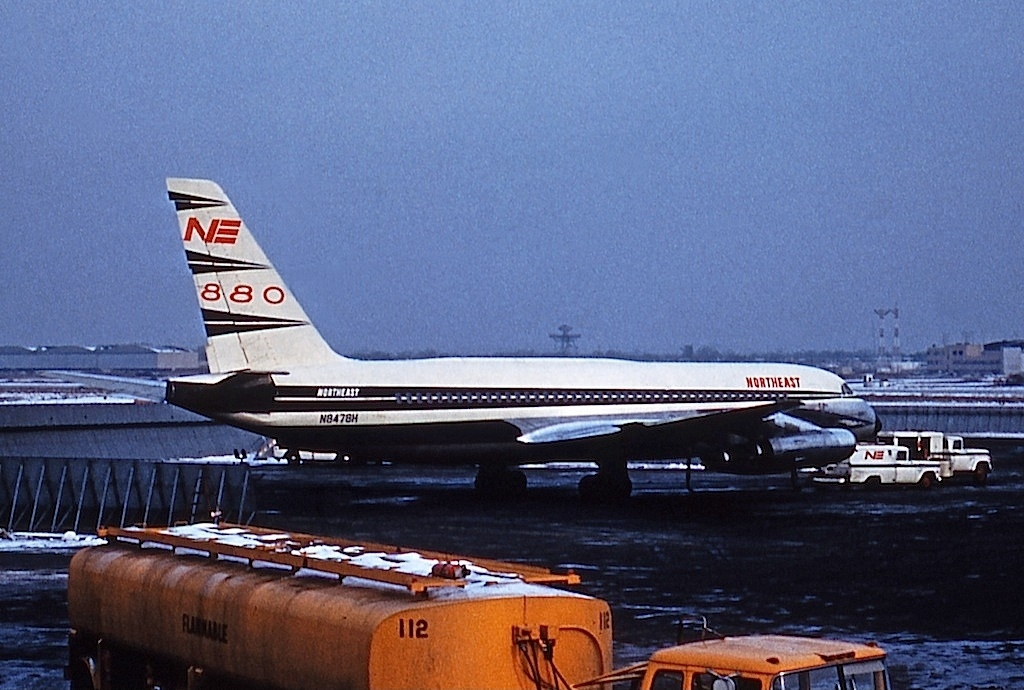
Convair 880 at New York, 1961

New England destinations dropped by Northeast Airlines in 1969* served by Cape Air as of 2024.
Destination	1970 Population
Bar Harbor, Maine*	3,716
Lewiston, Maine	41,779
Rockland, Maine*	8,505
Waterville, Maine	18,192
Keene, New Hampshire	20,467
Laconia, New Hampshire	14,888
Lebanon, New Hampshire*	9,725
Berlin, New Hampshire	15,256
Montpelier, Vermont	8,609
Newport, Vermont	4,664

Northeast also wrote off its three year old FH-227s in 1969, the circumstances providing insight into the problems that plagued the airline. Northeast originally had seven FH-227s, delivered in 1966 to replace DC-3s. One (N380NE) crashed in Lebanon, NH as Flight 946 in 1968, leaving six (N374NE thru N379NE). But in 1969, as its finances deteriorated, Northeast pulled out of ten New England airports, grounding the FH-227s and taking a write-down on them. The ten airports were for small New England points (the biggest of these, Auburn-Lewiston Airport, also being only 28 nautical miles from the airport at Portland, Maine). Of the ten points, seven of them have, as of 2024, no form of commercial air service, while the other three have Cape Air service which flies aircraft in the 10-seat class, yet Northeast served them with 44-seat FH-227s. Every trunk airline started with small points on their network (some just for the purposes of refueling), but over time, most of them shifted these to local service carriers or otherwise abandoned them. Northeast still had these small points on its network in 1969.

That wasn't the end of FH-227s for Northeast. It was able to walk away from some of the New England points by turning them over to Mohawk Airlines, which thought it could do better. Mohawk then had a disastrous strike in 1971 (which ultimately forced it to merge with Allegheny in 1972), after which it could no longer support Keene service. The CAB forced Northeast back into some of these points (like Keene, NH) and it had to pull two FH-227s out of storage, leaving three still stored with one leased out.

=== Waiting to merge ===
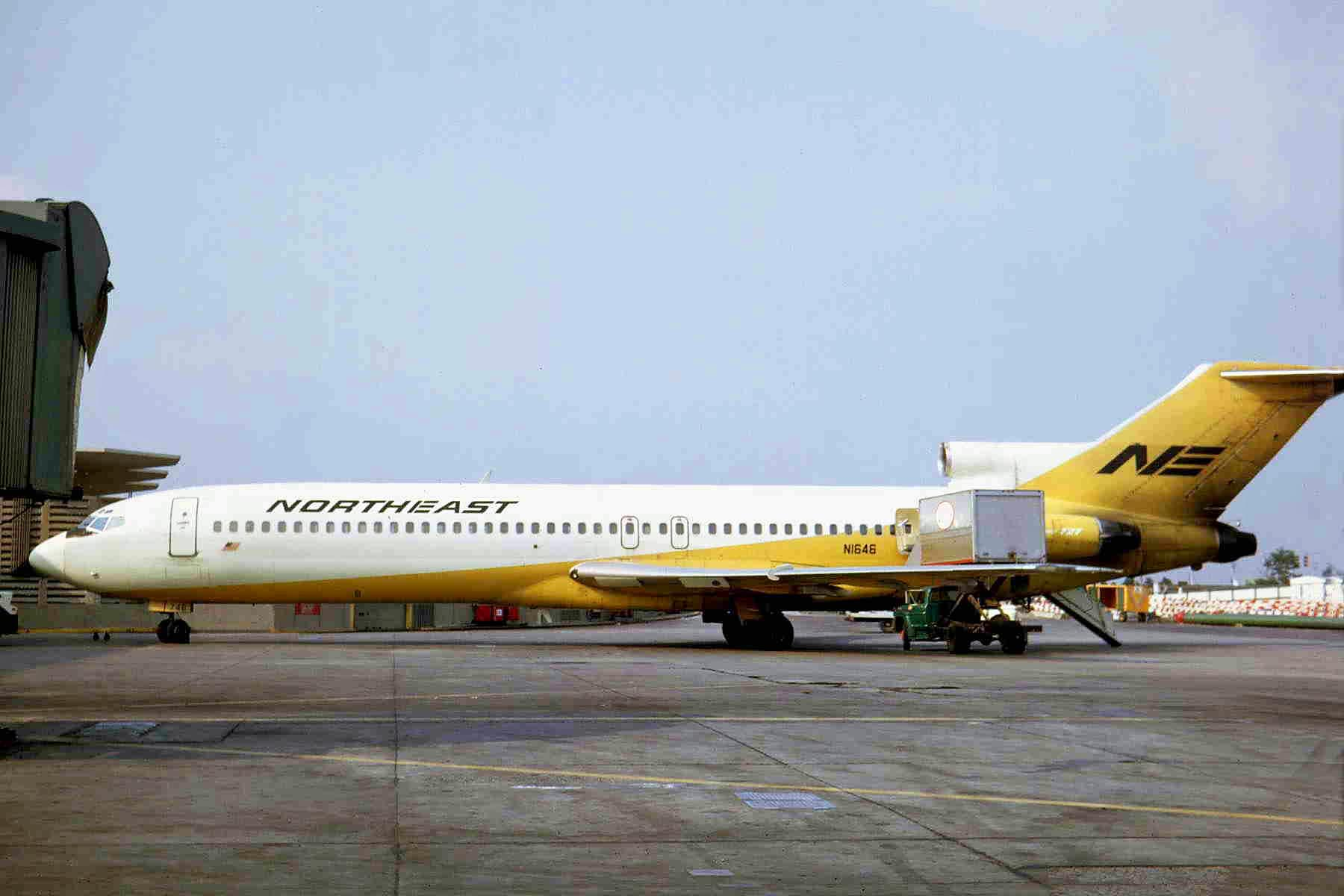
727-200 in "Yellowbird" livery at New York, 1970

At the end of 1969, following a long period of financial difficulties, Northeast announced its intention to merge with Northwest Airlines. The merger was approved by both the CAB and President Richard Nixon in 1970, but it was conditional upon relinquishing the Miami-Los Angeles route. Northwest terminated the merger negotiations in March 1971, and Northeast announced a new merger plan with Delta Air Lines the following month. The Delta merger was approved in May 1972, with the same condition that Delta could not operate the Miami-Los Angeles route. The merger was completed in August 1972. Note the delays between each merger announcement and final disposition. The CAB process took a long time, during which the company continued to lose a lot of money.

The airline's IATA code was NE.

== Legacy ==
Broadly-speaking, there were two legacies from Northeast:

=== Air New England ===
Nominally, Delta took over all of Northeast, including some (but not all) of the New England routes that caused Northeast so many problems; the CAB did not require that Delta them all. For a couple of years, Delta operated ex-Northeast FH-227s, at least the five that had not been leased out, the only passenger turboprop Delta operated directly. The Delta Flight Museum has pictures of FH-227s in Delta livery. Delta's July 1974 schedule shows Lebanon, Keene, New Bedford, Hyannis, Martha's Vinyard and Nantucket on-line, and gone in July 1975. However, in 1974, the CAB certificated Air New England (ANE), to that point a commuter/air taxi operator, specifically to operate the former problematic New England Northeast destinations with “big” aircraft, which it did from 1975. Delta lent ANE the money to buy the ex-Northeast FH-227s (and another loan to help ANE to transition to certificated status) and N374NE thru N379NE duly appeared in Air New England's fleet. Air New England was in some ways a partially reconstituted Northeast Airlines, at least insofar as New England routes were concerned. From 1975, when Air New England took over the routes, until the 1981 when it ceased operations, ANE was in significant financial distress notwithstanding CAB subsidies that reached up to 25% of ANE's annual revenues. In this respect, at least, the Northeast Airlines tradition lived on.

=== Delta Air Lines ===
Northeast's lasting impact on Delta was that it was Delta's entrée into Boston and points north, plus the Northeast to Florida routes, and routes to Bermuda and Bahamas. These are the bits that Delta wanted. This was the origin of Delta's presence in these markets. Northeast also contributed the Boeing 727-100 and 727-200 to Delta's fleet, types Delta did not operate prior to acquiring Northeast. Delta used these types as the workhorses of their fleet in the 1970s and 1980s and at one time was the world's largest operator of the Boeing 727-200.

== Destinations ==
Northeast Airlines served the following destinations during its existence:

=== Domestic ===
- California
  - Los Angeles – Los Angeles International Airport
- Connecticut
  - Hartford – Bradley International Airport
  - New London – Groton–New London Airport*
- District of Columbia/Virginia
  - Washington, D.C. – Ronald Reagan Washington National Airport
- Florida
  - Fort Lauderdale – Fort Lauderdale–Hollywood International Airport
  - Jacksonville – Imeson Airport*
  - Miami – Miami International Airport
  - Tampa – Tampa International Airport
- Illinois
  - Chicago – Chicago Midway International Airport
- Maine
  - Auburn/Lewiston – Auburn/Lewiston Municipal Airport*
  - Augusta – Augusta State Airport
  - Bangor – Bangor International Airport
  - Bar Harbor – Hancock County–Bar Harbor Airport
  - Caribou – Caribou Municipal Airport*
  - Houlton – Houlton International Airport*
  - Machias/Calais – Machias Valley Airport*
  - Millnocket – Millinocket Municipal Airport*
  - Portland – Portland International Jetport
  - Presque Isle – Northern Maine Regional Airport at Presque Isle
  - Rockland – Knox County Regional Airport
  - Waterville – Waterville Robert LaFleur Airport
- Maryland
  - Baltimore – Baltimore/Washington International Thurgood Marshall Airport
- Massachusetts
  - Boston – Boston Logan International Airport (Hub)
  - Fall River – Fall River Municipal Airport*
  - Martha's Vineyard – Martha's Vineyard Airport
  - Fitchburg – Fitchburg Municipal Airport*
  - Hyannis – Barnstable Municipal Airport
  - Lawrence – Lawrence Municipal Airport*
  - Nantucket – Nantucket Memorial Airport
  - New Bedford – New Bedford Regional Airport
  - Springfield – Metropolitan Airport*
  - Worcester – Worcester Regional Airport
- Michigan
  - Detroit – Detroit Metropolitan Wayne County Airport
- New Hampshire
  - Berlin – Berlin Regional Airport*
  - Concord – Concord Municipal Airport*
  - Keene – Dillant-Hopkins Airport*
  - Laconia – Laconia Municipal Airport*
  - Lebanon/White River Jct. – Lebanon Municipal Airport
  - Manchester – Grenier Field
- New Jersey
  - Newark – Newark Liberty International Airport
- New York
  - New York City
    - John F. Kennedy International Airport (Hub)
    - LaGuardia Airport
- Ohio
  - Cleveland – Cleveland Hopkins International Airport
- Pennsylvania
  - Philadelphia – Philadelphia International Airport
- Rhode Island
  - Providence – Pawtucket-Providence North Central Airport*
- Vermont
  - Burlington – Burlington International Airport
  - Montpelier/Barre – Edward F. Knapp State Airport*
  - Newport – Newport State Airport*

=== International ===
- Bahamas
  - Freeport – Grand Bahama International Airport
  - Nassau – Lynden Pindling International Airport
  - West End – West End Airport*
- Bermuda
  - L.F. Wade International Airport
- Canada
  - New Brunswick
    - Moncton – Greater Moncton Roméo LeBlanc International Airport
    - Saint John – Saint John Airport
  - Nova Scotia
    - Halifax – Halifax Stanfield International Airport
  - Quebec
    - Montréal – Montréal–Dorval International Airport

An asterisk (*) denotes this airport is no longer served by scheduled air service.

== Fleet ==
Prop aircraft

- Douglas DC-3
- Douglas DC-6 ("A" and "B" models)
- Convair 240
- Curtiss C-46 – one aircraft acquired in 1954 See External links for a photo of a Northeast C-46

Turboprop aircraft

- Bristol Britannia (ordered but not delivered to the airline)
- Fairchild Hiller FH-227
- Vickers Viscount 798 (operated until repossessed by Vickers)

Jet aircraft

- Boeing 707 (leased from Trans World Airlines (TWA))
- Boeing 727-100
- Boeing 727-200
- Convair 880
- Convair 990
- Douglas DC-9-15
- McDonnell Douglas DC-9-31
- Lockheed L-1011 (ordered but not delivered to the airline)

== Accidents and incidents ==
A series of crashes damaged the airline's image:

- On 27 August 1931, a Sikorsky S.41B (NC41V) on a Boston-Maine Airways flight from Halifax to Boston, with a stop in Portland, ditched in the Atlantic off of Gloucester, Massachusetts. The pilot had been forced to descend to maintain visibility in thick fog and decided to ditch the plane, tearing a hole in the left pontoon. There was one fatality; a fishing schooner rescued all but one of the 13 occupants from the wing, and the plane sank.
- On 11 August 1949, Northeast Airlines Flight 812A departed Boston and suffered a hard landing at Portland, causing significant damage to the aircraft, a Convair CV-240-13. An investigation determined "the probable cause of this accident was failure of the throttle looking device to function properly thus permitting the movement of the throttles beyond the stop into the propeller reverse pitch position."
- On 30 November 1954, Northeast Airlines Flight 792 crashed on approach to Berlin Regional Airport, with two fatalities.
- On 1 February 1957, Northeast Airlines Flight 823 crashed shortly after takeoff from New York City's LaGuardia Airport, with 20 fatalities.
- On 15 September 1957, Northeast Airlines Flight 285 crashed on approach to New Bedford Regional Airport, killing 12 of the 24 passengers and crew.
- On 15 August 1958, Northeast Airlines Flight 258 crashed on approach to Nantucket Memorial Airport, killing 25 of the 34 passengers and crew.
- On 15 November 1961, Vickers Viscount N6592C was written off when it collided with Douglas DC-6 N8228H of National Airlines after landing at Logan International Airport. The DC-6 had started to take off without receiving clearance.
- On 25 October 1968, Northeast Airlines Flight 946 crashed on approach to Lebanon Municipal Airport, killing 32 of the 42 passengers and crew.

The above incidents resulted in a total of 92 fatalities.

== See also ==
- List of defunct airlines of the United States

== Bibliography ==
- Gardner, G.E. (1953). First in New England skies. New York: Newcomen Society of North America.
- Wigton, D.C. (1963). From Jenny to jet-Pictorial histories of the world's great airlines. Los Angeles (CA.): Floyd Clymer Publications.
- Ladd Smith, H. (1965). Airways-The History of Commercial Aviation in the United States. Russell & Russell.
- Mudge, R.M. (1969). Adventures of a yellow bird. Boston: Branden Press.
- Davies, R.E.G. (1972). Airlines of the United States since 1914. Washington (D.C.): Smithsonian Institution Press.
