= Fall River Municipal Airport =

Former airport of Fall River, Massachusetts, United States (1951–1996)

- IATA: none; ICAO: KFLR; FAA LID: FLR

Summary
- Airport type: Defunct
- Operator: Naragansett Aircraft
- Location: Fall River, Massachusetts, U.S.
- Coordinates: 41°45′00″N 071°06′36″W
- Interactive map of Fall River Municipal Airport

Runways
Direction	Length		Surface
Direction	ft	m	Surface
6/24	3,948	1,203	Paved
15/33	1,600	487	Paved
- Source: www.airfields-freeman.com

Fall River Municipal Airport (ICAO: KFLR, FAA LID: FLR) was in Fall River, Massachusetts built between 1946 and 1951. The airport closed on February 18, 1996. The FAA deemed the airport unsafe due to a large landfill next to the airport, causing many seagulls, which disrupted airport operations. Its FAA code was FLR. The site of the airport is now an industrial park.

Northeast Airlines was discussed as a possible service provider to Fall River but it never happened. There was one attempt to have the city served by Mohawk Airlines but that failed too. The airport was built by the U.S. government as an "auxiliary" field associated with Quonset Naval Air Station and was once home to a few Massachusetts Air National Guard helicopters. From the early 1960s the city performed minimal maintenance. Runway lighting was marginally kept working by volunteer pilots who used the facility. There were attempts at revival but none achieved much success. In addition to the bird hazard from the landfill, numerous large apartment buildings were built nearby. Lack of security, including only rudimentary fencing, resulted in frequent vandalism to aircraft causing many owners to move to nearby New Bedford and Taunton (Massachusetts) airports.
