= Berlin Regional Airport =

- IATA: BML; ICAO: KBML; FAA LID: BML

Summary
- Airport type: Public
- Owner: City of Berlin
- Operator: City of Berlin
- Serves: Berlin, New Hampshire, United States
- Location: Milan, New Hampshire
- Elevation AMSL: 1,161 ft (354 m)
- Coordinates: 44°34′31″N 071°10′33″W
- Website: City of Berlin, Airport Website

Map
- Interactive map of Berlin Regional Airport

Runways
Direction	Length		Surface
Direction	ft	m	Surface
18/36	5,200	1,585	Asphalt

Berlin Regional Airport (IATA: BML, ICAO: KBML, FAA LID: BML) is an airport located in Milan, 8 miles (13 km) north of the central business district (CBD) of Berlin, a city in Coos County, New Hampshire, United States. This general aviation airport covers 575 acres (233 ha) and has one runway. It had scheduled air service to Burlington and Boston via Air Vermont in the early 1980s and at one point Northeast Airlines.

It is included in the Federal Aviation Administration (FAA) National Plan of Integrated Airport Systems for 2017–2021, in which it is categorized as a basic general aviation facility.

== See also ==
- List of airports in New Hampshire
