= Air Vermont =

US airline

IATA	ICAO	Call sign
MU	VMT	—
- Commenced operations: 1981; 45 years ago
- Ceased operations: 1984; 42 years ago
- Destinations: See Destinations served
- Headquarters: Burlington International Airport, Vermont

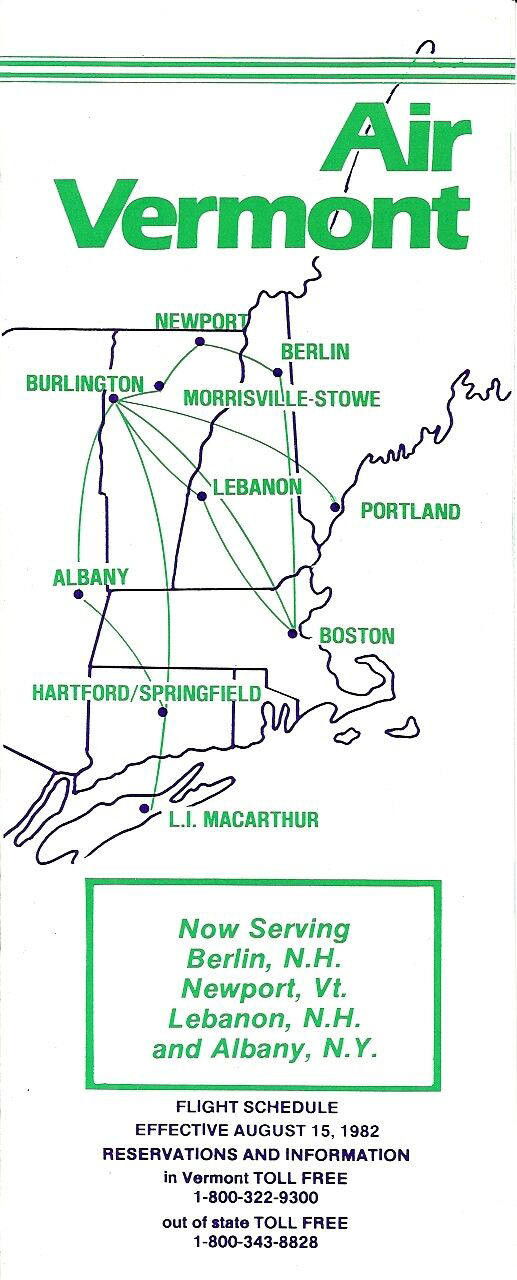
August 15th, 1982 timetable cover and route map

Air Vermont was a commuter airline in the United States based in Morrisville, Vermont. It was established in 1981 but suspended operations in 1984. It served several airports that are no longer served by scheduled airline service.

== Destinations ==
United States

- Connecticut
  - Bridgeport (Igor I. Sikorsky Memorial Airport)*
  - Hartford/Springfield (Bradley International Airport)
- District of Columbia
  - Washington
- Maine
  - Portland (Portland International Jetport)
- Massachusetts
  - Boston (Logan International Airport)
  - Nantucket (Nantucket Memorial Airport)
  - Pittsfield (Pittsfield Municipal Airport)*
  - Worcester (Worcester Regional Airport)
- New Hampshire
  - Berlin (Berlin Municipal Airport)*
  - Lebanon (Lebanon Municipal Airport)
- New York
  - Albany (Albany International Airport)
  - Long Island/Islip (Long Island MacArthur Airport)
  - New York (John F. Kennedy International Airport)
- Pennsylvania
  - Wilkes-Barre/Scranton (Wilkes-Barre/Scranton International Airport)
- Vermont
  - Burlington (Burlington International Airport)
  - Morrisville-Stowe (Morrisville-Stowe State Airport)*
  - Montpelier (Edward F. Knapp State Airport)*
  - Newport (Newport State Airport)*

Those airports marked with an asterisk (*) are no longer served by scheduled airline service.

== See also ==
- List of defunct airlines of the United States

== Fleet ==
2 – Beech C99 Commuter
