= Morrisville–Stowe State Airport =

- IATA: MVL; ICAO: KMVL; FAA LID: MVL

Summary
- Airport type: Public
- Owner: State of Vermont
- Operator: Stowe Aviation
- Serves: Morrisville, Vermont
- Elevation AMSL: 733 ft (223 m)
- Coordinates: 44°32′05″N 072°36′50″W
- Website: MVL website

Map
- Interactive map of Morrisville–Stowe State Airport

Runways
Direction	Length		Surface
Direction	ft	m	Surface
1/19	3,700	1,128	Asphalt

Statistics (2018)
- Aircraft operations: 3,898
- Based aircraft: 29
- Source: Federal Aviation Administration

Morrisville–Stowe State Airport (IATA: MVL, ICAO: KMVL, FAA LID: MVL) is a public airport located two miles (3 km) southwest of the central business district of Morrisville, a village in Lamoille County, Vermont, United States. It is owned by the State of Vermont. The airport had scheduled passenger airline service via Air Vermont in the 1980s.

In April 2014, the airport closed for four months of improvements, including rebuilding the runway and lighting; it reopened on August 1, with private company Stowe Aviation operating the facility. The improvements were funded by a $4 million federal grant from the Airport Improvement Project, and made up the first phase of Stowe Aviation's planned upgrades, with $20 million more in private investment to be used to build a new terminal building, maintenance facility, and other supporting infrastructure.

Commercial air service resumed in December 2015, when Tradewind Aviation begins service to Westchester County Airport in White Plains, New York.

== Facilities and aircraft ==
Morrisville–Stowe State Airport covers an area of 112 acres (45 ha) which contains one asphalt paved runway (1/19) measuring 3,700 x 75 ft (1,128 x 23 m).

For the 12-month period ending December 31, 2018, the airport had 3,898 aircraft operations, an average of 75 per week: 83% general aviation, 8% military and 9% air taxi. There were 29 aircraft based at this airport: 21 single engine, 2 multi-engine, 5 gliders, and 1 ultralight.

== See also ==
- List of airports in Vermont
