= Air New England (1970–1981) =

US regional airline (1970–1981)

IATA	ICAO	Call sign
NE	—	—
- Founded: 25 September 1970
- Commenced operations: 16 November 1970
- Ceased operations: 31 October 1981
- Destinations: See below
- Headquarters: Boston

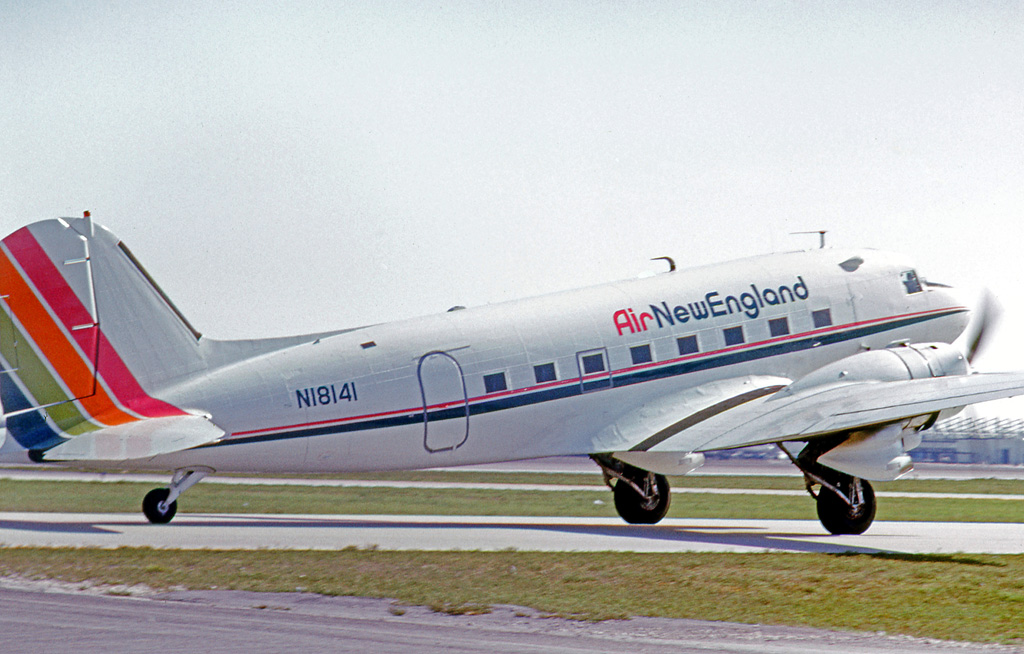
DC-3 at Miami in 1974

Air New England (ANE) was a US regional airline in New England during the 1970s and early 1980s. It was headquartered at Logan International Airport in the East Boston area of Boston, Massachusetts. ANE was noneconomic for most of its existence. From 1975 through its last year, 1981, ANE depended heavily on government subsidies. Depending on the year, these accounted for 17 to 25% of operating revenues, despite which the airline was generally unprofitable. ANE collapsed in the early years of US airline deregulation.

== History ==
=== Startup ===
Multi-colored tail wing, used from 1970 to 1975

Air New England, Inc., was incorporated as a Massachusetts company on September 25, 1970, originally located in Barnstable, MA with directors Joseph Whitney (president), Nelson Lee and George Parmenter. Parmenter was head of Cape & Island Airline, a dba of Cape & Islands Flight Service. Whitney was a founder and former president and Nelson a former EVP of Executive Airlines, and at the start the airline was staffed with mostly former Executive staff. Whitney had left Executive after a disagreement with its main shareholder. ANE was billed as a “renaming” of Cape & Islands to better reflect the New England-wide service area of the airline but the two remained separate corporations until both were dissolved after ANE stopped flying. News articles at the time of ANE's founding/first flight (which occurred November 16, 1970) speak of Beech 99s and DHC-6 Twin Otters and show a picture of an ANE Beech 99, but the US Civil Registry of January 1971 shows two Beech 18s (and a Twin Otter). A September 1971 schedule shows the fleet included Beech 99s, DC-3s, Beech 18s and Twin Otters. Until 1974, Air New England was categorized as an air-taxi, or commuter, that part of the US airline business that was unregulated because it flew small aircraft, which at the time were defined as carrying 30 or fewer passengers with a maximum payload of 7,500lbs. In that year, the US Civil Aeronautics Board (CAB), a now defunct Federal agency that, at the time, tightly regulated the US airline business, certificated Air New England, allowing it to fly larger aircraft but also making it subject to CAB oversight. As discussed below, such certification of an air taxi or commuter operator was unusual.

ANE was privately held. Its two major owners were Fairleigh Dickinson, Jr. and Robert Hudson Kanzler. Kanzler was a son of Ernest C. Kanzler, an early Ford Motor Company executive (who persuaded Henry Ford to move beyond the Model T, but was forced out as a result) and a friend of Edsel Ford. Ernest and Edsel married sisters so Henry Ford II was Robert Kanzler's first cousin. His mother, Josephine Hudson Clay, was a niece of the childless founder of Hudson's, the one-time Detroit department store that was a forerunner to Target, explaining Robert Kanzler's middle name.

Over the first four years of operation, Air New England grew to become the dominant commuter airline in New England, overcoming and ultimately driving out of business the former dominant player, Executive Airlines. ANE's original network linked New York LaGuardia and Boston to three destinations in Massachusetts (New Bedford, Hyannis and Nantucket) and three in Maine (Portland, Augusta and Waterville). ANE's traffic grew from 90,000 passengers in 1971 to 320,000 in 1974. It triumphed by first concentrating on the Islands and Cape business (Martha's Vinyard, Nantucket, Hyannis), undercutting Executive (which, although larger, had a far worse cost structure), largely driving them out of this area by 1972. Then, fed by profits from the Islands and Cape, ANE moved its attention to the north, again undercutting Executive. Executive declared bankruptcy in December 1971 and went out of business entirely in December 1973, selling some assets to ANE. ANE's summer 1974 network linked LaGuardia and Boston to four destinations in each of Maine and Massachusetts, as well as one in New Hampshire and two in Vermont. See Fleet section below for how its fleet changed during this time.

=== Certification ===
Air New England received certification in 1974 as a result of the CAB's New England Service Investigation, the focus of which was the New England routes that caused long-term financial distress to Northeast Airlines. Northeast was a trunk carrier that had merged into Delta in 1972 after many years of losses. Northeast's New England route network was more similar to that of a local service carrier, the carriers the CAB had originally certificated to fly smaller routes. Northeast had been obligated to serve many small New England cities. Like most local service carriers, Northeast required subsidies to operate its network. After 1955, Northeast was the only trunk carrier that needed subsidies to survive, subsidies the CAB paid until 1968. Also included in the investigation were a couple of New England routes that Allegheny Airlines had inherited in its 1972 merger with Mohawk Airlines.

The recommendation of the CAB's administrative law judge and its staff was to give these unprofitable New England routes to unregulated air taxi or commuter operators. The New England states and communities saw things differently and board members themselves believed New England deserved the benefits of certificated service with larger aircraft. The Board's solution was to certificate ANE, giving them the routes Northeast and Mohawk had been unable to fly profitably, relieving Delta and Allegheny of the obligation. With this background, ANE's record of financial distress from 1975 onward (see nearby table) is not a surprise. The CAB essentially made ANE the designated certificated operator of routes that were proven losers, at least for a carrier flying “big” airplanes under CAB supervision. (For ANE, "big" aircraft were Fairchild-Hiller FH-227s, a slightly larger US built version of the Fokker F-27 turboprop. These were, in fact, the same aircraft Northeast had flown.)

Air New England was the first domestic carrier in the contiguous US to be certificated for multiple routes at one time since the local service carriers had been certificated in the late 1940s/early 1950s, so its certification was a big deal. There had been US carriers certificated for international routes only (like Trans Caribbean Airways in 1957) and domestic carriers originally certificated to fly a single route only (Aspen Airways in 1967, TAG Airlines in 1969 and Wright Air Lines in 1972) but nothing like Air New England. The CAB categorized its carriers and deemed Air New England a “regional carrier”, slotting it in under the local service carriers and above the single route certificated carriers like Aspen and Wright. Air New England was in a category of its own until Air Midwest was certificated as another regional carrier in 1976.

Exacerbating the effect of the poor hand it was dealt by the CAB, ANE made things harder on itself. For instance, at New York LaGuardia Airport, it used the Marine Air Terminal, far from the main terminal, making connections to other carriers difficult – it provided a courtesy bus to move people between terminals, but noted it might take 45 minutes to arrive. Considering ANE was designed to be a regional feeder airline, and that in the regulated era interlining among CAB carriers was mandatory, the difficulty of making connections with ANE at LaGuardia was a big mistake. ANE was also asleep at the switch when deregulation was signed into law. It was a near-certainty this would make ANE's life harder, yet it failed to immediately apply to the CAB for increased subsidy. Established CAB practice was that subsidy changes dated from the day new rates were requested – no backdating. ANE didn't apply until months later, needlessly foregoing additional monies. It took the CAB to court to try to get that lost money, and lost. More generally, ANE seems to have had no serious plan for how to deal with deregulation. It did expand outside of New England, but such routes in the 1 October 1981 timetable, just before it died, have a random nature to them – Boston-to-Albany-to Rochester-to Cleveland-to Baltimore. There seems little rhyme or reason to these choices.

Air New England Financial Results, 1975 thru 1981
USD 000	1975	1976	1977	1978	1979	1980	1981^{(1)}
Op revenue	14,578	15,364	17,908	20,801	26,312	28,436	20,325
Of which subsidy	2,963	3,590	3,818	3,770	4,524	7,117	4,914
Op profit (loss)	(891)	(662)	203	(1,289)	(2,055)	(290)	(3,812)
Net profit (loss)	(1,527)	(1,287)	56	(2,044)	(2,779)	273	(2,128)
Op margin	-6.1%	-4.3%	1.1%	-6.2%	-7.8%	-1.0%	-18.8%
Net margin	-10.5%	-8.4%	0.3%	-9.8%	-10.6%	1.0%	-10.5%
Subsidy/op revenue	20.3%	23.4%	21.3%	18.1%	17.2%	25.0%	24.2%
(1) Nine months ending September 30.

Company Logo

Air New England shut down on October 31, 1981, with 400 employees. The company cited "intolerable financial losses" caused by competition, lack of federal subsidies, cumulative expenses, and a decrease in revenue caused by the contemporaneous strike by the air-traffic controllers' union, PATCO. ANE had been carrying close to 600,000 passengers a year in 1980. In 1981, it depended on $6.1 million in federal subsidies to cover operating costs. During its 12-year existence, the airline suffered only one serious incident/crash [cited below] and had one of the highest safety/reliability ratings of all American based airlines over that 12-year period."

In September 1981, Wright Air Lines signed a tentative $10 million deal to purchase ANE. In the end, Wright walked away from ANE, with its owners doing the same, shutting Air New England on October 31, 1981. As an industry source noted, “Air New England didn't have anything to sell.”

An on-demand charter operator named Air New England based in Fort Lauderdale, Florida, and Portland, Maine, has been operating since 2010.

== Destinations ==
- Connecticut
  - Hartford – Bradley International Airport
  - New Haven – Tweed New Haven Airport
  - New London – Groton–New London Airport
- Maine
  - Augusta – Augusta State Airport
  - Lewiston – Auburn/Lewiston Municipal Airport
  - Portland – Portland International Jetport
  - Waterville – Waterville Robert LaFleur Airport
- Maryland
  - Baltimore – Baltimore/Washington International Thurgood Marshall Airport
- Massachusetts
  - Boston – Boston Logan International Airport
  - Hyannis – Barnstable Municipal Airport
  - Martha's Vineyard – Martha's Vineyard Airport
  - Nantucket – Nantucket Memorial Airport
  - New Bedford – New Bedford Regional Airport
- New Hampshire
  - Keene – Dillant–Hopkins Airport
  - Lebanon – Lebanon Municipal Airport
  - Manchester – Manchester–Boston Regional Airport
- New York
  - Albany – Albany International Airport
  - New York City – LaGuardia Airport
  - Rochester – Greater Rochester International Airport
- Ohio
  - Cleveland – Cleveland Hopkins International Airport
- Rhode Island
  - Newport – Newport State Airport
  - Providence – Rhode Island T. F. Green International Airport
- Vermont
  - Burlington – Burlington International Airport
  - Montpelier – Edward F. Knapp State Airport

== Fleet ==
At year-end 1970, Air New England's operating fleet comprised three DHC-6 Twin Otters, one Beech 99, two Beech 18s and one Aero Commander 500B. In June 1974, the operating fleet comprised five DC-3s, eight Twin Otters, four Beech 99s and two Aero Commanders. The Aero Commanders were not used in scheduled service.

World Airline Fleets 1979 lists Air New England as having eight FH-227s and ten DHC-6 Twin Otters.

- Beech 18
- Beech 99
- Convair 580 (some leased seasonally from Aspen Airways)
- de Havilland Canada DHC-6 Twin Otter
- Douglas DC-3
- Fairchild Hiller FH-227

== Accidents and incidents ==
On 17 June 1979, an Air New England de Havilland Twin Otter aircraft crashed while approaching Barnstable Municipal Airport in Hyannis, Massachusetts. One person, the pilot, was killed.

== See also ==
- List of defunct airlines of the United States
