= Naval Auxiliary Air Facility Nantucket =

- Nantucket, Massachusetts in United States

Site information
- Owner: United States Department of Defense
- Operator: United States Navy
- Open to the public: No

Location
- Coordinates: 41°15′10″N 70°03′32″W

Site history
- Built: 1942
- In use: 1945
- Fate: Turned over to civilian use
- Battles/wars: World War II

Airfield information
- Elevation: 13 metres (43 ft) AMSL
Runways
Direction	Length and surface
6/24	1,219 metres (3,999 ft) Asphalt
15/33	1,219 metres (3,999 ft) Asphalt

Naval Auxiliary Air Facility Nantucket was a United States Navy facility located in Nantucket, Massachusetts operational from 1942 to 1945. It existed as an auxiliary air facility of Naval Air Station Quonset Point.

== History ==
In 1940, Naval Air Station Quonset Point was established in nearby Rhode Island. Due to the Navy's need to expand to 27,500 aircraft, it was decided to build multiple auxiliary air facilities, including one in Nantucket. The Navy decided to lease the existing Nobadeer Airport, which totaled 572 acres (231 ha; 2.31 km^{2}). The proposed facility would have a refueling station and emergency support for one-half of an Air Carrier Group of the Eastern Sea Frontier Command.

Naval Auxiliary Air Facility Nantucket was commissioned on September 13, 1943, and consisted of the construction of two 4,000 ft (1,200 m) runways, five barracks for 100 enlisted men, a mess for both enlisted men and officers, one hangar, magazine huts, and a sewage disposal unit. Although it was created to provide support for the Eastern Sea Frontier Command, records indicate that it was being used before it was commissioned, and was afterward a staging point for training of all kinds from NAS Quonset Point. The facility was later improved in or around the date of commissioning with stabilized roads for the transportation of ammunition and loaded aircraft, for use in an experimental rocket training program carried out at the 2,896 acres (1,172 ha; 11.72 km^{2}) Tom Nevers Target Area, also known as the Nantucket Ordnance Site.

Over the next two years, various improvements were added to the site, including a firehouse, a gasoline storage facility, hangars for planes in one squadron, steel magazines, and 14,089 yd^{2} (2.911 acres; 11,780 m^{2}) of parking space. Additionally, additional ammunition magazines were added in June 1945, and a control tower was added the same year along with other buildings. Training also occurred at Tom Nevers, and the Hummock Pond Aerial Target Range and the Sheep Pond Rocket Training Range, both located nearby the facility. A water range was also located a half of a mile south of the island in the Atlantic Ocean, offshore of Surfside.

Rocket training at the station ceased on September 1, 1945 when the ranges were secured, and two weeks later, operations ceased at the base. The facility was decommissioned on December 1, 1945, and disestablished on January 15, 1945. The facility was declared surplus on 17 April, and released to the town of Nantucket on 15 May.

== Redevelopment ==
Today, the field operates as Nantucket Memorial Airport.

== See also ==
- List of military installations in Massachusetts
