= Dillant–Hopkins Airport =

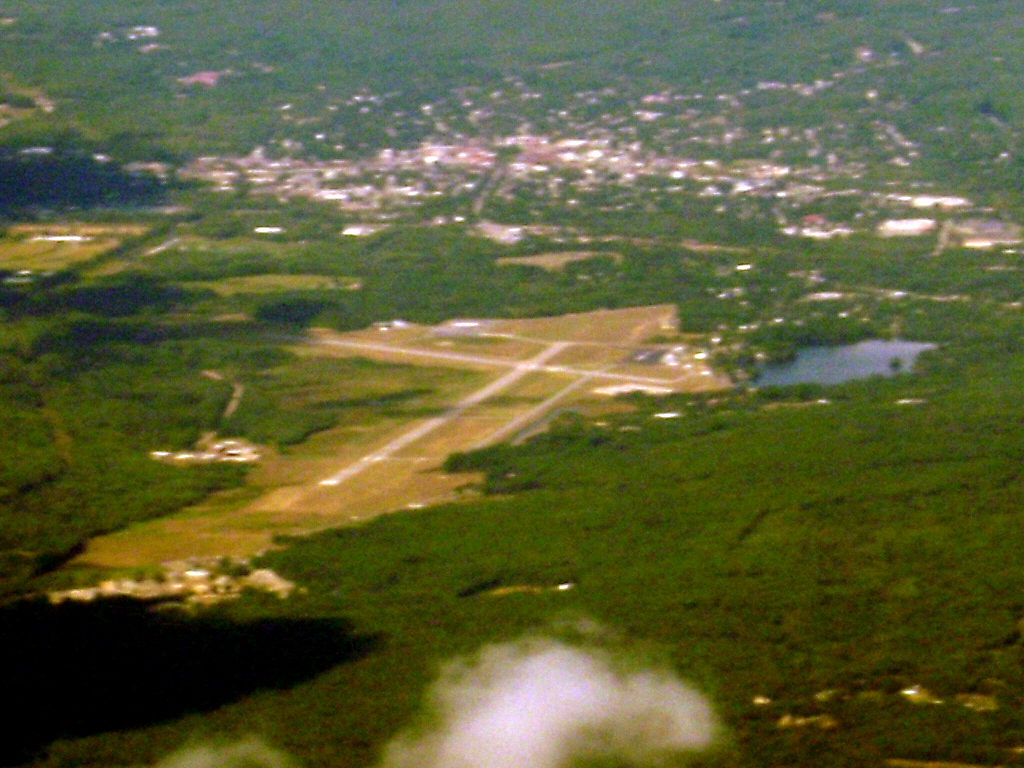
- IATA: EEN; ICAO: KEEN; FAA LID: EEN

Summary
- Owner: City of Keene
- Serves: Keene, New Hampshire
- Location: Swanzey, New Hampshire
- Elevation AMSL: 488 ft (149 m)
- Coordinates: 42°53′54″N 072°16′15″W
- Website: Official website

Maps
- FAA airport diagram
- Interactive map of Dillant–Hopkins Airport

Runways
Direction	Length		Surface
Direction	ft	m	Surface
2/20	6,201	1,890	Asphalt
14/32	4,001	1,220	Asphalt

Dillant–Hopkins Airport (IATA: EEN, ICAO: KEEN, FAA LID: EEN) is a general aviation airport located 2 miles (3.2 km) south of the central business district (CBD) of Keene, in Cheshire County, New Hampshire, United States. It covers 888 acres (359 ha) and has two runways. It was included in the Federal Aviation Administration (FAA) National Plan of Integrated Airport Systems for 2017–2021, in which it is categorized as a regional general aviation facility.

The city enjoyed six decades of regularly scheduled airline service starting in the 1940s, with multiple daily flights operated with a mix of commuter prop, regional turboprop and mainline jet service. As of June 2008, however, the airport had no commercial airline service.

== History ==
The land upon which the airport sits was purchased in 1942 and was dedicated October 31, 1943, before a crowd of five thousand. Among the officials dedicating the land were Governor Robert O. Blood and senators Styles Bridges and Charles W. Tobey. The new airport was named to honor Thomas David Dillant and Edwin Chester Hopkins, from Keene and Swanzey respectively, who had both died fighting the war.

In 1945 a steel hangar was constructed at the airport, which would also see local operations moved to it from West Keene. At about this time Lee Bowman became the manager of the airport and would run a flight school out of it. Regular air service from Dillant–Hopkins Airport began in 1946 when Northeast Airlines opened a route from Keene to Springfield, Massachusetts. As the inaugural flight from the airport, a Douglas DC-3 carried 2,600 letters, 11 passengers, and a fresh apple pie sent from the mayor of Keene to the mayor of New York. By 1948, Keene was a stop on a service operated by Northeast Airlines with a DC-3 linking New York City with Montreal. According to the June 16, 1948, Northeast system timetable, this flight operated a daily roundtrip routing of New York City - Hartford/Springfield - Keene - Lebanon, NH - Montpelier/Barre, VT - Burlington, VT - Montreal.

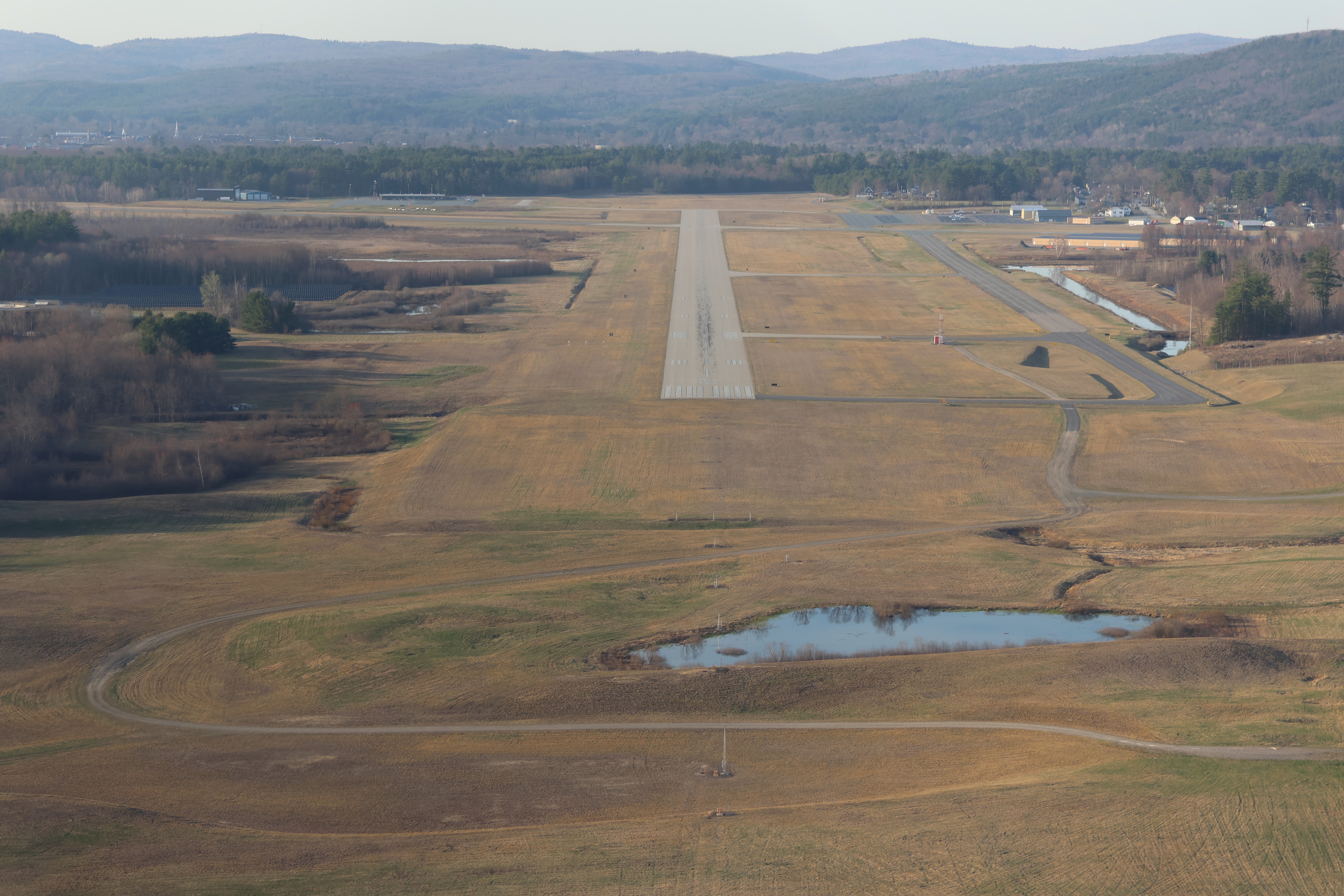
Dillant-Hopkins Airport as viewed from runway 02 final approach

Initially Dillant–Hopkins provided air service of two flights a day before being forced to fly a single flight a day. From January to May 1948 all air service from the airport was suspended. When regular air service resumed in May an air freight service was added. Lights for the runways were put in place in 1948 to 1949, and two years later the airport's signal beacons were added. By 1952 several industries were maintaining private airplanes for business purposes, and it was estimated that 200 planes a month were serviced by the airport.

In 1953 Dillant–Hopkins hosted an air show which brought flying teams from the U.S. Air Force and U.S. Navy to Keene. This air show coincided with other events in Keene, including the historic pageant The Happy Valley and a visit by then Miss America Neva Jane Langley. That same year Wiggins Airways ceased serving Keene after losing a battle to do business with the city.

1954 saw Northeast Airlines begin its air freight service out of the airport, six years after air freight service first began there. Mohawk Airlines joined Northeast Airlines flying out of Keene, making the city the first in the state to be served by two airlines, offering flights to New York, Albany, Boston, and Lebanon, NH. The runways were extended in 1956, and night lighting and other improvements were installed in 1958. By the second half of 1958 Keene had become the third largest city in the state to offer passenger service and the second largest to offer air freight service.

In May 1961 Mohawk ceased serving Keene with the DC-3 and switched to the larger, more modern Convair 440 for its passenger service into the airport. With the ability to carry 54 passengers, the Convair 440 became one of the largest aircraft to land at Dillant–Hopkins at the time. From 1962 to 1963 further additions were made to the airport, perhaps brought about by the new passenger planes. In 1964, Northeast Airlines was operating nonstop service to New York John F. Kennedy Airport with four-engine Douglas DC-6B propliners in addition to other flights to other destinations operated with DC-3 aircraft. Northeast then began the first turboprop service to Keene with the 48-passenger Fairchild Hiller FH-227 in 1966. The first turboprop arrived in September after a fifty-minute flight from New York John F. Kennedy Airport (JFK); the arrival in Keene was greeted by 500 people which included city officials and airport personnel. By 1969, Northeast was operating up to seven departures a day from the airport with the FH-227 propjet, with nonstop flights to New York LaGuardia Airport, Lebanon, NH, and Montpelier/Barre, VT.

In 1967 the FAA recommended a $1.8 million series of improvements which would include further extending the runways, the construction of a control tower, improved buildings, and other facilities. The recommendation was brought on by increased activity at the airport and nearly 24,000 aircraft operating out of the airport on a yearly basis. Also in 1967 both Northeast and Mohawk Airlines began to study routes that would include flights to Chicago from Keene. Mohawk was operating Fairchild Hiller FH-227 turboprop service into the airport in 1967 with nonstop service to Albany (ALB) and Worcester (ORH) with one-stop service to Boston (BOS) and Syracuse (SYR) as well as no change of plane flights to Cleveland (CLE). However, by 1972 Mohawk had turned all of its Keene service over to Executive Airlines, a Boston-based commuter air carrier which in turn was operating nonstop flights to Albany and Worcester with one-stop service to Boston.

1967 saw Vice President Hubert H. Humphrey make a brief stop in Keene while on a trip to attend a concert in Vermont. A crowd of 200 were on hand to greet him.

Scheduled airline passenger jet service arrived in Keene during the early 1970s. Delta Air Lines had acquired and merged with Northeast Airlines in 1972, which resulted in Delta introducing McDonnell Douglas DC-9-30 jetliner flights into the airport. According to the March 1, 1973, Delta system timetable, the airline was operating a daily DC-9-30 nonstop to New York LaGuardia Airport (LGA) with this flight, offering direct, no change of plane service to Philadelphia (PHL) and Miami (MIA). This same Delta timetable also lists daily direct one stop DC-9-30 jet service to Boston (BOS) via a stop in nearby Manchester, NH (MHT) with this jet flight originating in Dallas with intermediate stops in Shreveport, Jackson, MS, Birmingham, AL and New York LaGuardia as well as Fairchild Hiller FH-227 turboprop flights operated by Delta to New York LaGuardia and John F. Kennedy (JFK) airports and also to nearby Lebanon, NH (LEB). The Delta FH-227 aircraft had been previously operated by Northeast Airlines.

Also in 1972, Mohawk Airlines was acquired by Allegheny Airlines, which in turn continued to serve Keene. The March 1, 1974, Allegheny system timetable lists flights operated by the airline with Convair 580 turboprops nonstop to Worcester and one-stop service to Boston.

According to the April 15, 1975, Official Airline Guide (OAG), Allegheny and Delta were no longer serving Keene. This same OAG lists nonstop flights to New York LaGuardia Airport operated at this time by Air New England with Fairchild Hiller FH-227 turboprops.

== Previous airline service ==
- Air New England (Boston, Lebanon, New York)
- Allegheny Airlines (Boston, Worcester)
- Atlantic North Airlines (Boston, Laconia, Newark, Rutland), hub
- Colgan Air (Rutland, Newark)
- Continental Airlines
  - Continental Connection operated by Colgan Air (Rutland, Newark)
- Delta Air Lines (Boston, Lebanon, NH, Manchester, NH, New York-LaGuardia and JFK-Philadelphia and Miami)
- Eastern Airlines
  - Eastern Express operated by Precision Airlines (Boston, Lebanon/Hanover/White River Junction, Newark, New York)
- Executive Airlines (Boston)
- Merrimack Air System (Albany, Boston, Burlington)
- Mohawk Airlines (Albany, Boston, Cleveland, New York, Syracuse)
- Northeast Airlines (Hartford, Lebanon, NH, Montpelier/Barre, VT, New York LaGuardia Airport)
- Northern Airways (Burlington, Hartford/Springfield, Rutland)
- PAC Air (Nashua, Boston)
- Pilgrim Airlines (Hartford/Springfield, Manchester, New York-LaGuardia)
- Precision Airlines (Boston, Lebanon/Hanover/White River Junction, Newark, New York), focus city
- Rainbow Air (Hartford/Springfield, Boston, Manchester, Nashua), focus city
- Rutland Airways (Albany, Rutland)
- SkyMaster Airlines (Boston, Laconia, Newark, Rutland), hub
- Trans New England Airlines (Boston, Lebanon)
- Wiggins Airways (Fitchburg, Orange)
- Winnipesaukee Airlines (Laconia)

== Accident and incidents ==
- On March 3, 2023, a Bombardier Challenger 300 en route to Leesburg Executive Airport encountered severe turbulence shortly after departing from Dillant-Hopkins Airport, killing one female passenger on board. The aircraft quickly diverted to Bradley International Airport.
- On July 19, 1972 a Blue Angels McDonnell Douglas F-4J Phantom II received extensive damage on landing when the drag chute failed to open and the jet skidded off the rain-slicked runway and flipped over. The two crewmembers were released from local hospital after observation. The Blue Angels performed at the Keene Air Show the weekend following the crash.

== See also ==
- List of airports in New Hampshire
