= Nantucket Memorial Airport =

Airport serving Nantucket, Massachusetts, United States

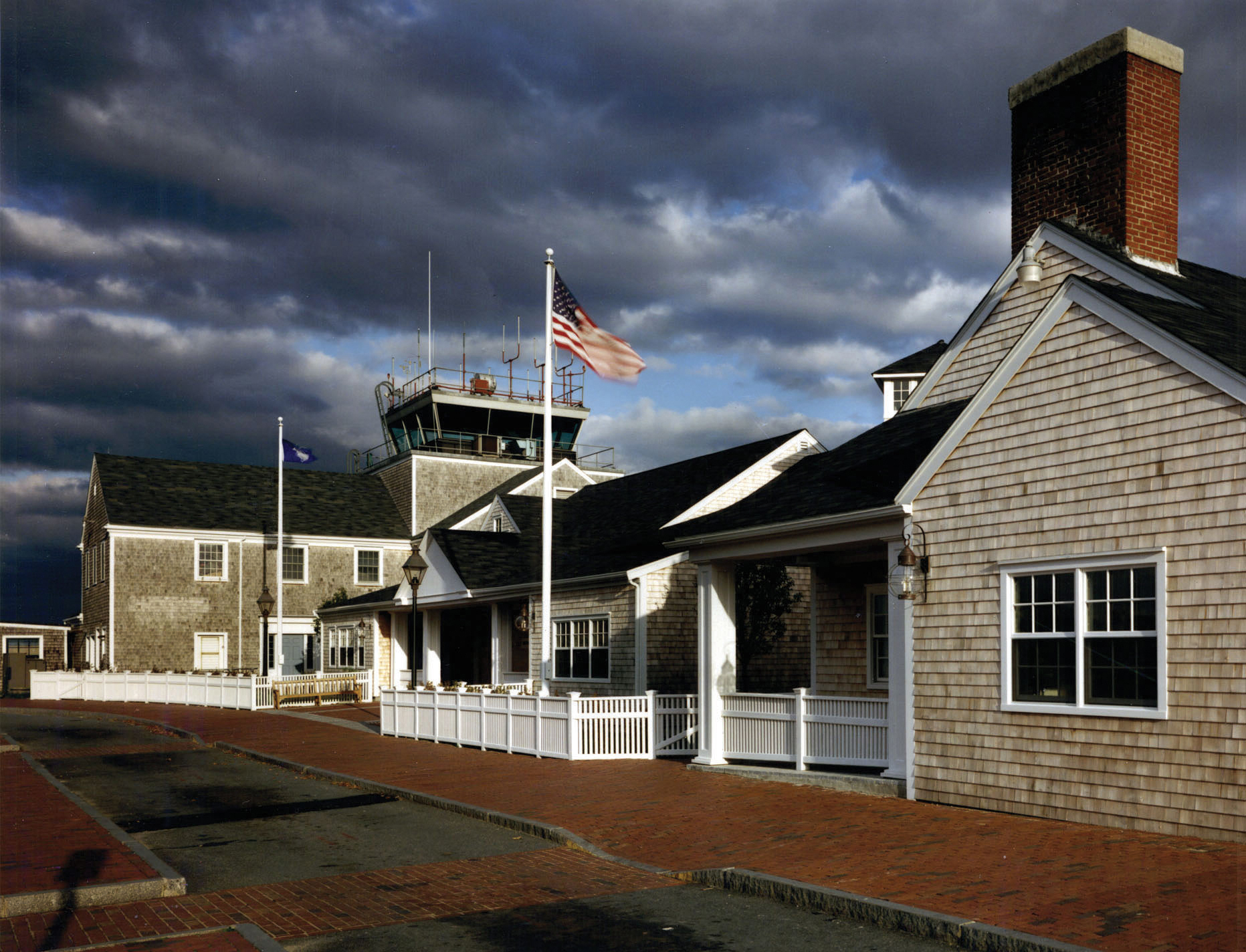
- Terminal
- IATA: ACK; ICAO: KACK; FAA LID: ACK

Summary
- Airport type: Public
- Owner: Town of Nantucket
- Operator: Nantucket Memorial Airport Commission
- Serves: Nantucket, Massachusetts
- Focus city for: Reliant Air (Note: Reliant Air has temporarily suspended all flights for 2022.)
- Operating base for: Cape Air; Nantucket Airlines
- Elevation AMSL: 48 ft (15 m)
- Coordinates: 41°15′10.4″N 070°03′32.4″W
- Website: www.nantucketairport.com

Maps
- FAA airport diagram
- Interactive map of Nantucket Memorial Airport

Runways
Direction	Length		Surface
Direction	ft	m	Surface
6/24	6,303	1,921	Asphalt
15/33	4,500	1,372	Asphalt

Statistics
- Aircraft operations (2025): 117,204
- Based aircraft (2022): 18

Nantucket Memorial Airport (IATA: ACK, ICAO: KACK, FAA LID: ACK) is a public airport on the south side of the island of Nantucket, Massachusetts, United States. It is owned by the Town of Nantucket and is located three miles (5 km) southeast of the town center. It is the second-busiest airport in the state, after Logan International Airport, due to intense corporate travel to and from the island in the high season.

== History ==
In the late 1930s, Leslie Holm, a farmer in Nobadeer, plowed over and smoothed some of his cornfields with the help of David Raub, a former test pilot who had moved to Nantucket, and together they formed the Nobadeer Flying Service with three small planes they had bought for charter and instruction. Soon, they began allowing the Town of Nantucket to use fields on his property as an airfield. Holm's farmhouse, located at the intersection of Old South and Nobadeer Farm Roads, is still standing today, although airport buildings have been built around it.

During World War II, the U.S. Navy took control of the airport and operated it as Naval Auxiliary Air Facility Nantucket. The Navy constructed temporary bunkers and buildings, of which the buildings were torn down after the war. The bunkers, which were constructed using concrete and steel, are currently used for airport storage.

The airport was returned to the Town of Nantucket on June 20, 1946 and on August 25, 1946 it was dedicated as Nantucket Memorial Airport to honor the 11 Nantucket men who lost their lives in the war and all the people from Nantucket who served in the war.

== Terminal and facilities ==
The airport covers 1,200 acres (490 ha) at an elevation of 48 feet (15 m) above sea level. It has two asphalt runways:

- Runway 6/24: 6,303 ft × 150 ft (1,921 m × 46 m), ILS/DME equipped, with approved GPS approaches.
- Runway 15/33: 4,500 ft × 100 ft (1,372 m × 30 m), has approved GPS approaches.

For the 12-month period ending April 30, 2021, the airport had 50,963 aircraft operations, an average of 140 operations per day: 56% air taxi, 41% general aviation, 2% commercial and 1% military. In April 2022, there were 18 aircraft based at this airport: 15 single-engine and 3 multi-engine.

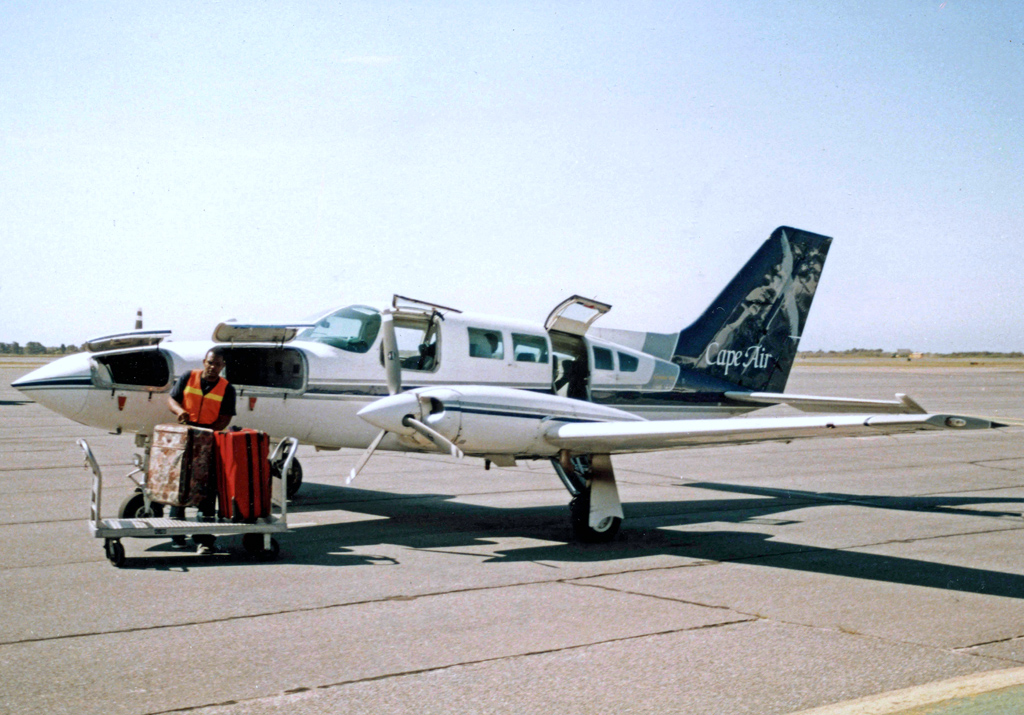
Cape Air Cessna 402 being unloaded at Nantucket in 2005

In 2009, the terminal was updated with an upgrade of the previous 12,000 square feet (1,100 m^{2}) and an expansion of 18,000 square feet (1,700 m^{2}) at a cost of approximately $29 million. A major goal of the expansion was to increase the capacity of the terminal substantially over the original 1950s facility. Another goal was to segregate air-taxi passengers, who do not require security screening, from airline passengers, who do.

The airport apron for commercial aircraft has eight parking stands for Cessna 402 aircraft mainly operated by Cape Air and Nantucket Airlines. There are also four larger parking stands for JetBlue A220 jets, American Eagle Airlines CRJ-200/CRJ-700/CRJ-900 and Embraer 175 regional jets, Delta Connection CRJ-200/CRJ-700 regional jets and United Express ERJ-145 regional jets. More stands are available if needed. Most of the parking is reserved for general aviation aircraft, with parking for the larger, commercial services located on the north side of the terminal.

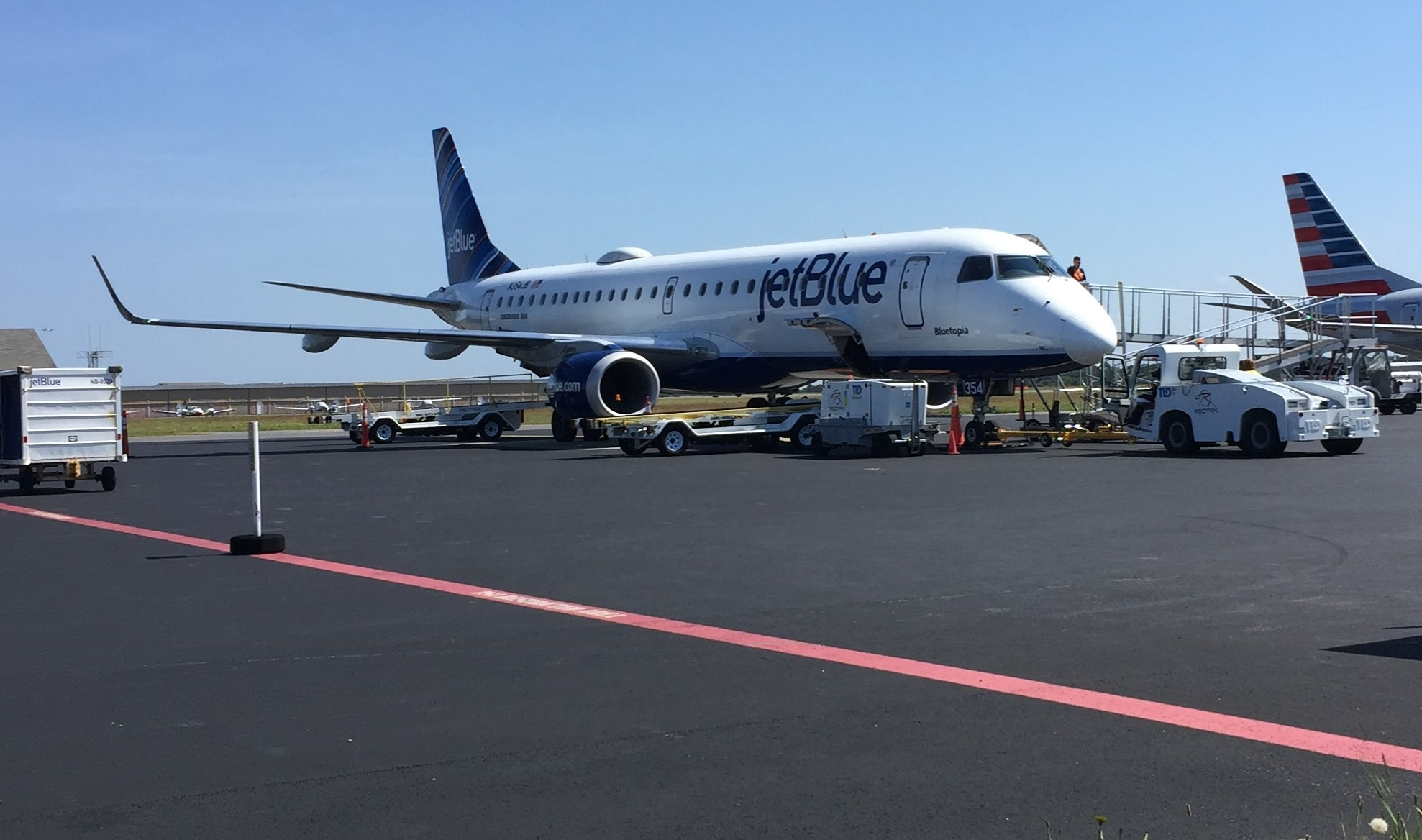
A JetBlue Embraer ERJ 190-100 parked on the apron at Nantucket Regional Airport in 2017

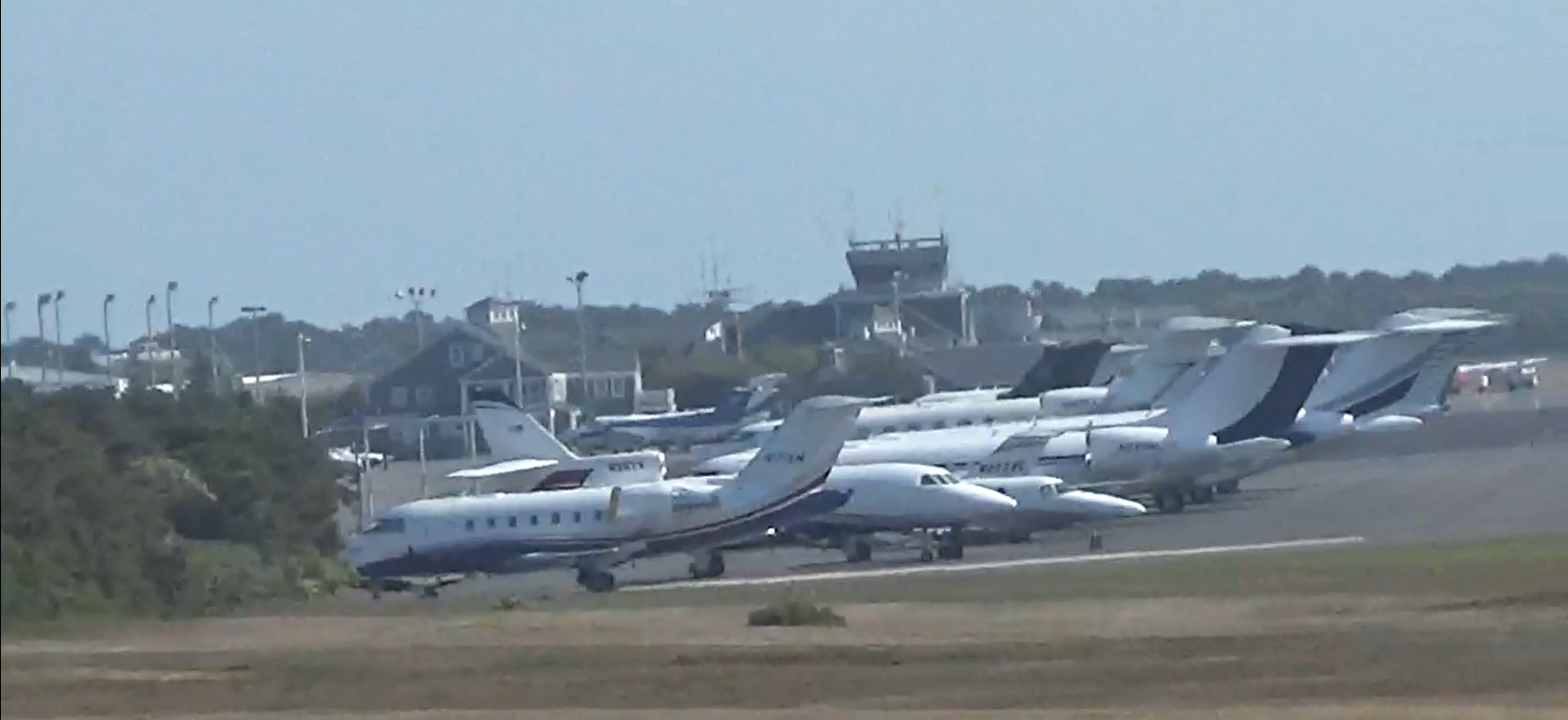
Nantucket Airport Terminal with business and Charter Jets on Fixed-base operator ramp

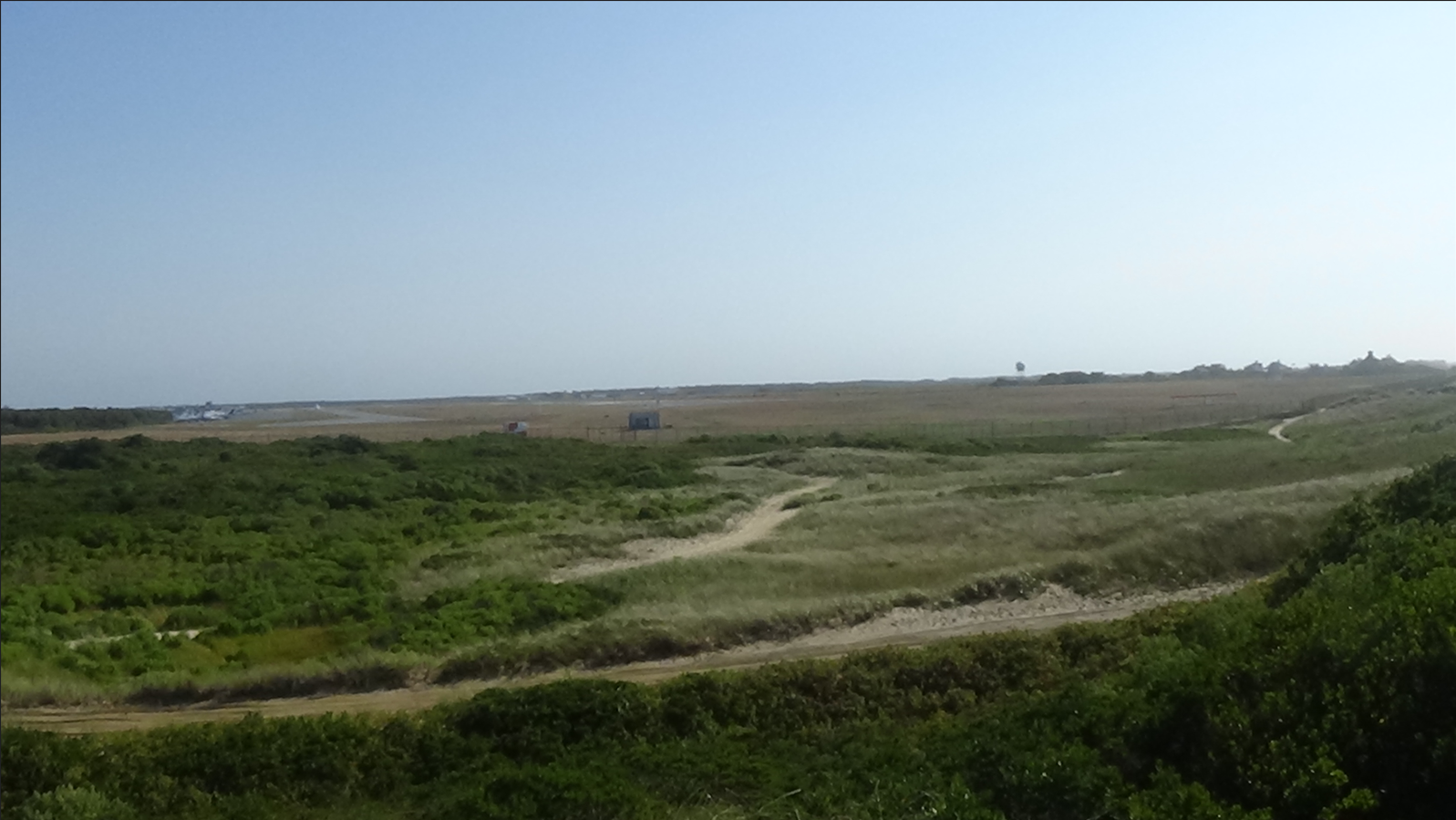
Nantucket Memorial Airport from 1 mile away, picture taken Sand Dunes in between Nobadeer beach and Surfside Beach

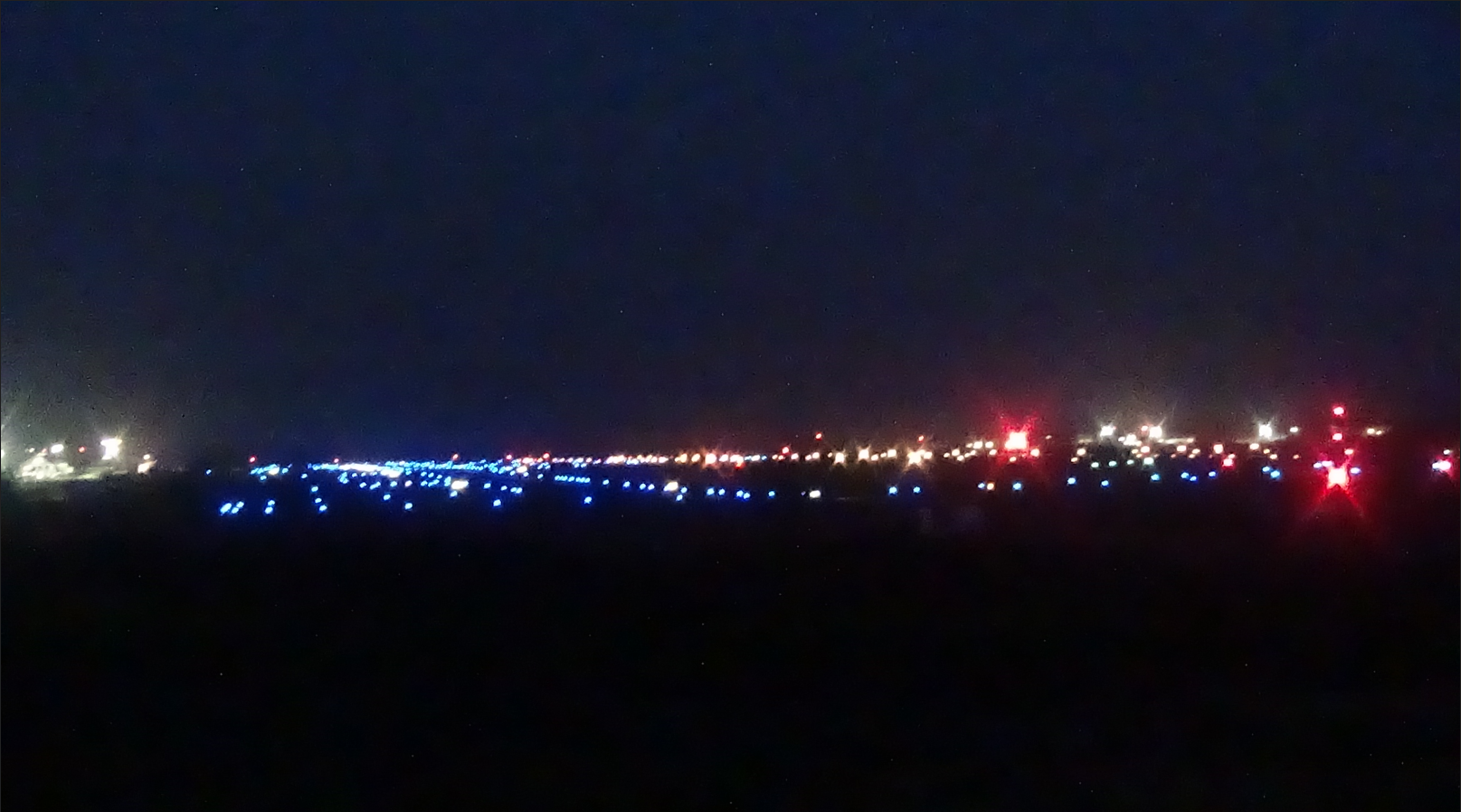
Nantucket Memorial Airport at night

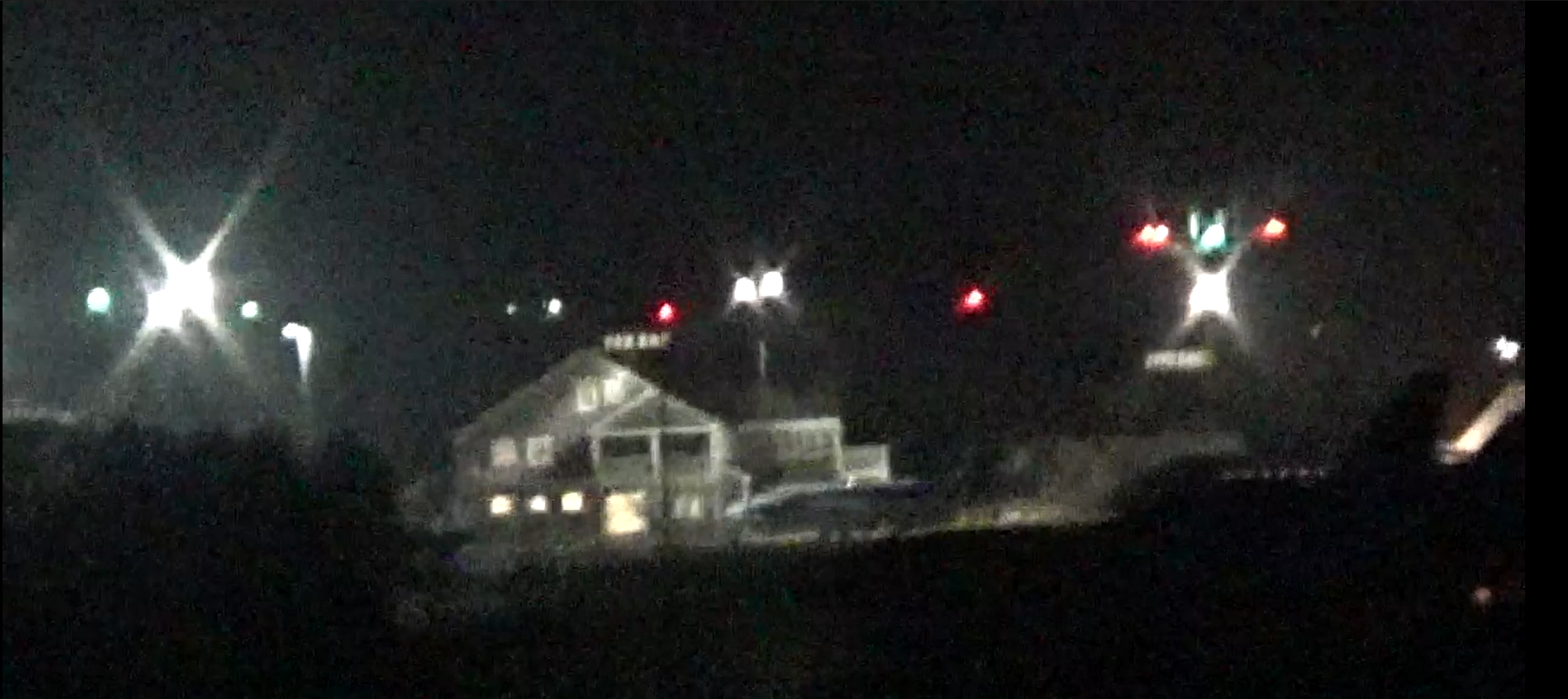
Nantucket Memorial Airport from sand dunes at night

== Airlines and destinations ==
=== Passenger ===
Airlines	Destinations
American Eagle	Seasonal: Boston, Charlotte, Chicago–O'Hare, New York–LaGuardia, Philadelphia, Washington–National
Cape Air	Boston, Hyannis, Martha's Vineyard, New Bedford; Seasonal: New York–JFK, Norwood
Delta Connection	Seasonal: New York–JFK, New York–LaGuardia
JetBlue	Seasonal: Boston, New York–JFK, New York–LaGuardia, Washington–National, White Plains
Reliant Air	Seasonal charter: Danbury
Tradewind Aviation	Seasonal charter: Teterboro, White Plains
United Express	Seasonal: Chicago–O'Hare, Newark

Destinations map
All destinations from Nantucket Memorial Airport (ACK).

• Red represents year-round destinations.
• Green represents seasonal destinations.

• Blue represents future destinations.

=== Cargo ===
Airlines	Destinations
FedEx Feeder	Providence

=== Historical airline service ===
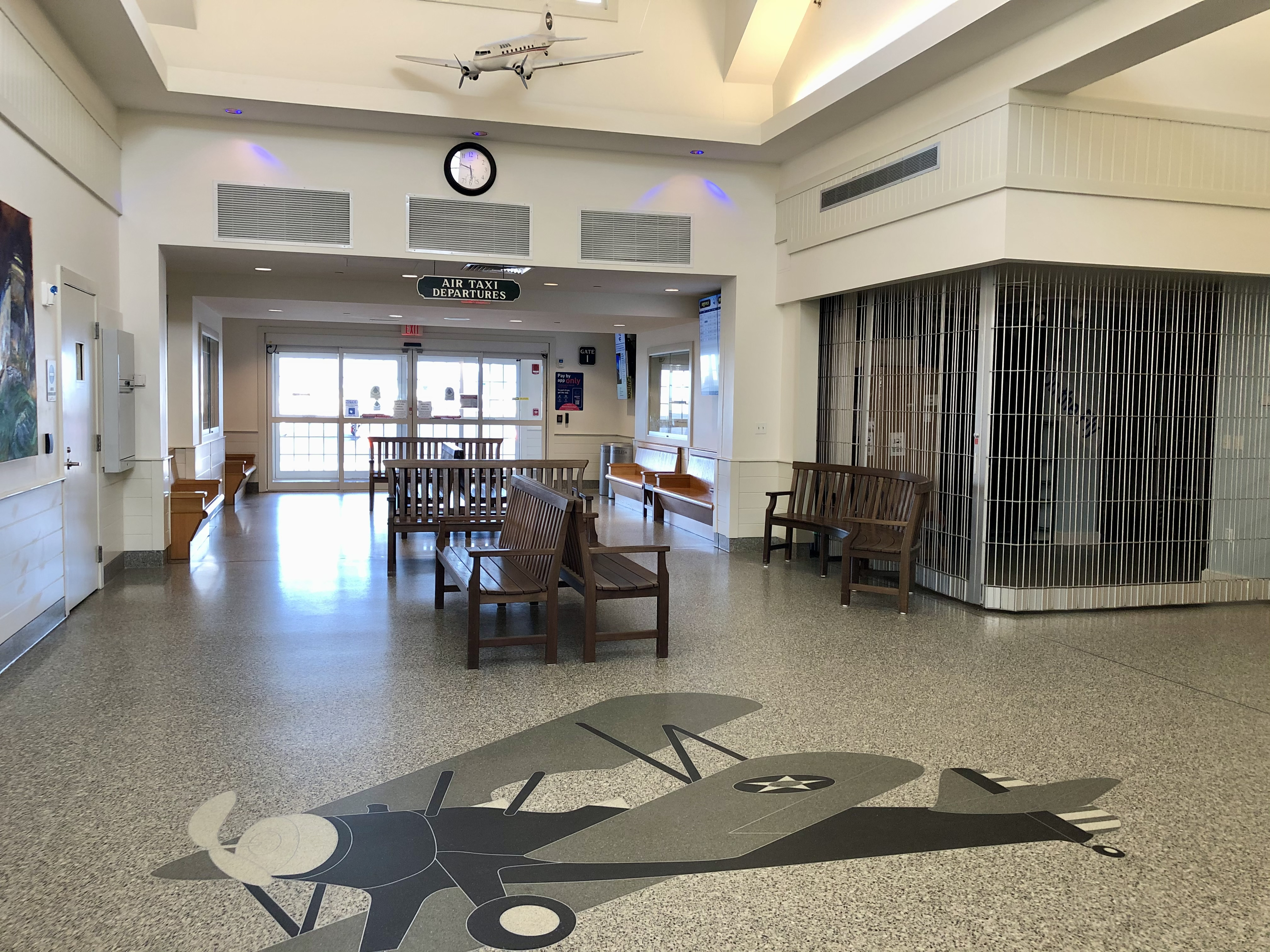
The departures gate inside Nantucket in 2020

Up through the 1990s, a variety of airlines served Nantucket, some of which used jet airliners as large as the McDonnell Douglas DC-9-30 which was operated into the airport in 1969 on a seasonal basis during the summer months by Northeast Airlines on nonstop flights to New York JFK Airport and Hyannis with Northeast also serving Nantucket with Fairchild Hiller FH-227 turboprops at this time. Major air carrier Continental Airlines also served the airport in the past with DC-9-30 jets. Business Express, a Delta Connection air carrier operating on behalf of Delta Air Lines, also operated seasonal jet flights into Nantucket utilizing British Aerospace BAe 146-200 aircraft. The Official Airline Guide (OAG) lists several commuter and regional airlines serving Nantucket over the years. In the spring of 1975, Air New England was the only airline serving the airport according to the OAG with this commuter air carrier operating Beechcraft 99 and de Havilland Canada DHC-6 Twin Otter turboprops as well as Douglas DC-3 prop aircraft. By the fall of 1979, small air carriers Gull Air, Hyannis Aviation and Nor-East Commuter Airlines had joined Air New England at the airport. Air Vermont also provided non-stop service to Boston in the early 1980s. Up until 1989, Provincetown-Boston Airlines (PBA) served Nantucket, using Douglas DC-3 prop aircraft and NAMC YS-11 turboprops. PBA also operated Eastern Express flights into the airport on behalf of Eastern Airlines with DC-3 aircraft. Continental Express flying on behalf of Continental operated ATR 42, Embraer EMB-120 Brasilia and Saab 340 regional turboprop airliners into the airport in the past. US Airways Express previously served Nantucket in the past as well on behalf of US Airways with de Havilland Canada DHC-8 Dash 8 and Saab 340 turboprops. In June 1999, five airlines were serving Nantucket according to the OAG: Cape Air operating Cessna 402 commuter aircraft, Continental Express flying Beechcraft 1900 commuter turboprops, Delta Connection operated by Business Express Airlines flying Saab 340 regional turboprops, Island Airlines operating Cessna commuter prop aircraft and US Airways Express flying Beechcraft 1900 and de Havilland Canada DHC-8 Dash 8 turboprops.

=== Air Force Two at Nantucket ===
The airport is currently home to a variety of general aviation aircraft, ranging from Piper J-3 Cubs to Boeing Business Jets in the summer months. The 46th President of the United States and former Vice President of the United States Joe Biden visited the island on seven Thanksgiving holidays during his eight-year vice presidential term, arriving and departing on board a U.S. Air Force operated Boeing 757-200 (USAF aircraft designation Boeing C-32) flying as Air Force Two. The aircraft was accompanied by a USAF operated Boeing C-17 Globemaster III cargo jet. The C-32 and C-17 are currently the largest aircraft ever to land and takeoff from Nantucket. The largest regularly scheduled passenger airliner flown in mainline service was the McDonnell Douglas DC-9-30 jet operated by Northeast and Continental. Currently, the largest commercial jetliner serving the airport is the Embraer E175 (operated by American Eagle, Delta Connection and United Express) and seasonally the A220-300 operated by JetBlue (previously operated by E190 up until retirement of the aircraft).

== Statistics ==
=== Top destinations ===
Busiest domestic routes from ACK (September 2025 – August 2026)
Rank	Airport	Passengers	Carriers
1	Boston, Massachusetts	38,540	Cape Air, JetBlue
2	New York–LaGuardia, New York	24,720	American, Delta, JetBlue
3	White Plains, New York	20,140	JetBlue, Tradewind
4	New York–JFK, New York	19,370	Delta, JetBlue
5	Washington–National, D.C.	18,740	American, JetBlue
6	Newark, New Jersey	9,880	United
7	Philadelphia, Pennsylvania	8,610	American
8	Hyannis, Massachusetts	4,650	Cape Air
9	Chicago–O'Hare, Illinois	2,160	American, United
10	New Bedford, Massachusetts	1,880	Cape Air

=== Airline market share ===
Largest airlines at ACK (September 2025 – August 2026)
Rank	Airline	Passengers	Share
1	JetBlue	124,000	40.32%
2	Republic Airways (American Eagle, Delta Connection, United Express)	90,190	29.40%
3	Nantucket Airlines (Cape Air)	56,330	18.37%
4	GoJet (United Express)	20,000	6.52%
5	Tradewind	10,600	3.46%
	Other	5,940	1.94%

== Accidents ==
- On the evening of August 15, 1958, Northeast Airlines Flight 258, a Convair CV-240-2 crashed 0.3 mi (0.48 km) northeast of ACK attempting a VOR instrument approach to runway 24 in heavy fog. The aircraft struck the ground 1,450 ft (440 m) short of the runway and 600 ft (180 m) to the right of the extended centerline. Of the 34 on board, 22 passengers and three crew members died. Pilot error was the cause of the accident.

== See also ==
- Wings (1990 TV series)
- List of airports in Massachusetts
