= Northeast Airlines Flight 823 =

1957 aviation accident

Coordinates: 40.7910°N 73.8902°W

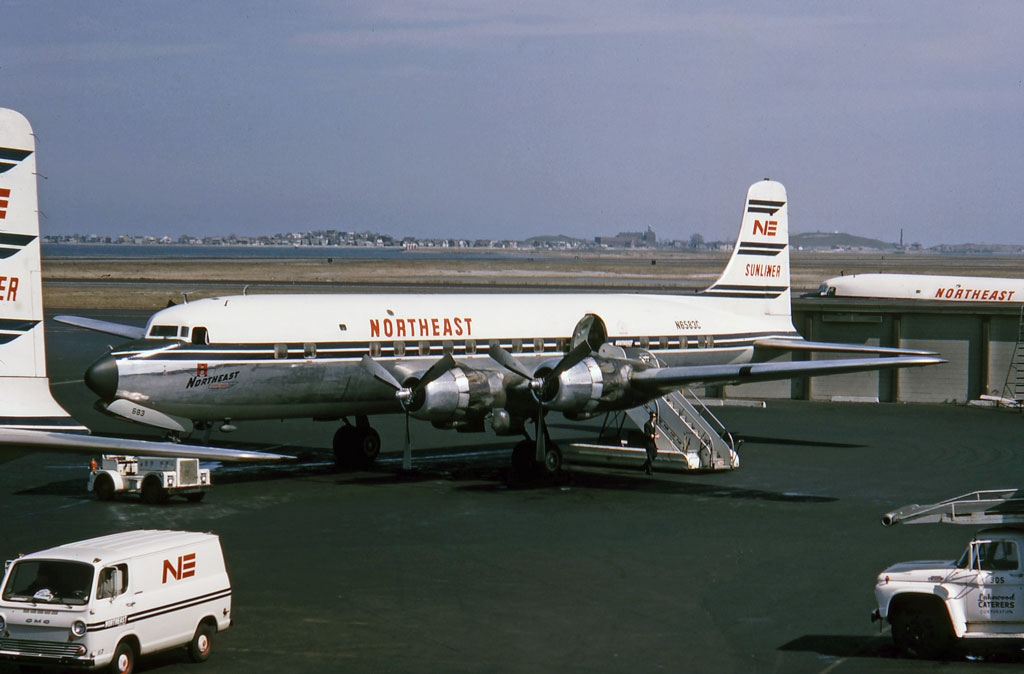
- A Northeast Airlines DC-6, similar to the one involved in the accident

Accident
- Date: February 1, 1957
- Summary: Spatial disorientation
- Site: Queens, New York City, New York, United States

Aircraft
- Aircraft type: Douglas DC-6A
- Operator: Northeast Airlines
- Registration: N34954
- Flight origin: LaGuardia Airport
- Destination: Miami International Airport
- Passengers: 95
- Crew: 6
- Fatalities: 20
- Injuries: 78
- Survivors: 81

Northeast Airlines Flight 823 was a scheduled flight in the United States, from New York City's LaGuardia Airport to Miami International Airport, Florida, which crashed shortly after takeoff on February 1, 1957. The aircraft operating the service was a Douglas DC-6 four-engined propeller airliner, registration N34954, which entered service in 1955. It crashed near Rikers Island, which sent corrections personnel and inmates to rescue and assist survivors.

== Accident sequence ==
While originally scheduled to depart at 2:45 pm, delays due to snowfall pushed departure back to 6:01 pm. At takeoff, with a nearly full complement of 95 passengers and 6 crewmembers (3 flight crew and 3 stewardesses), the plane weighed in at 98,575 pounds (44,713 kg), just 265 pounds (120 kg) below maximum takeoff weight. Despite some sliding of the nosewheel on snow-covered pavement, the airplane was cleared to take off via runway 04 (040° magnetic heading, departing to the northeast of the field.

After what was described as a normal takeoff roll, the aircraft lifted off. Upon establishing a positive rate of climb, the landing gear and wing flaps were retracted, and the engine power was reduced to the maximum except for takeoff (METO) setting. The aircraft was now gaining altitude, flying on instruments without outside visibility as it headed over Flushing Bay. While the aircraft's clearance instructed that it proceed northeast on a heading of 040° (runway heading), the airplane began a gradual turn to the left. When it had reached a heading of 285° (nearly due west), it overflew Rikers Island. Its altitude was insufficient to clear the trees on the island, and the aircraft crashed, coming to rest within 1,500 feet (460 m) of the point of first impact. The duration of the flight from takeoff to crash was approximately 60 seconds. The crash resulted in 20 fatalities and 78 injuries among the passengers and several injuries but no fatalities among the crew.

== Recovery ==
Shortly after the crash, Rikers Island department personnel and prison trusties alike ran to the crash to help survivors. As a result of their actions, of the 57 inmates who assisted with the rescue effort, 30 were released and 16 received a reduction of six months by the NYC Parole Board. Governor W. Averell Harriman also granted commutation of the sentences of 11 men serving definite terms: two received a six-month reduction, and one workhouse and eight other penitentiary definites became eligible for immediate release.

== Investigation ==
An investigation by the Civil Aeronautics Board was hampered by a lack of information about what transpired aboard the aircraft in its final minute, as flight data and cockpit voice recorders had not yet been routinely installed in commercial aircraft. The Board found that the probable cause of the accident was "The failure of the captain to: 1) properly observe and interpret his flight instruments, and 2) maintain control of his aircraft." In layman's terms, the captain lost spatial awareness when he entered the clouds seconds after takeoff, and therefore didn't detect or correct the airplane's deviation from its desired course.

== In popular culture ==
The flight was the featured story in a book on aviation written by Alvin Moscow, Tiger on a Leash. Told from the hindsight of 1961, it discussed many aspects of passenger flight of the time.

== See also ==
- List of accidents and incidents involving commercial aircraft
