= New Bedford Regional Airport =

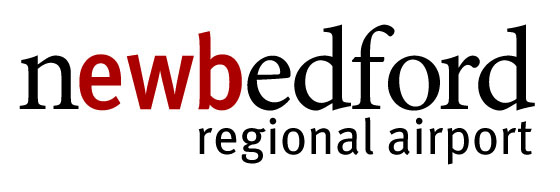

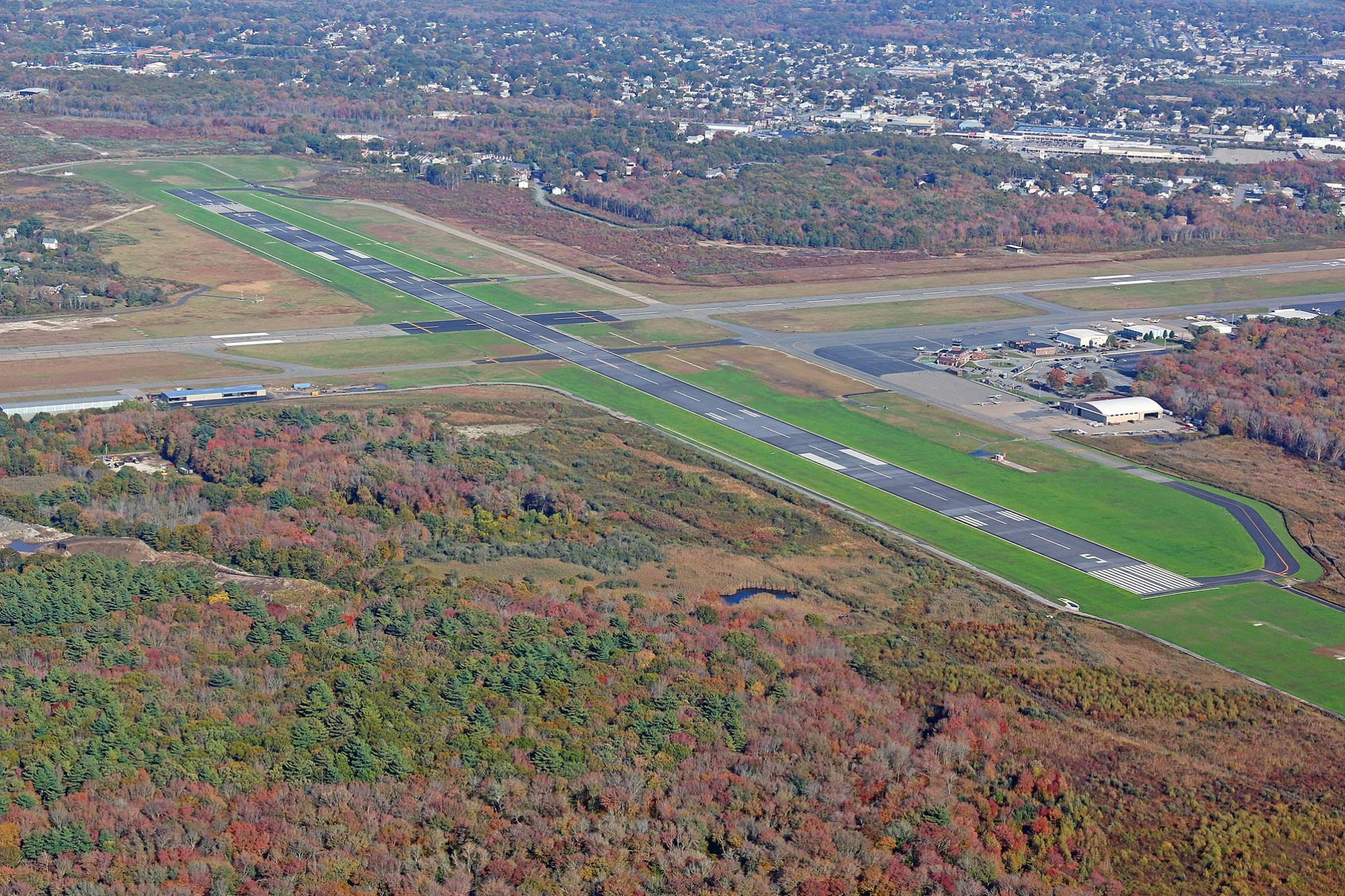
- IATA: EWB; ICAO: KEWB; FAA LID: EWB

Summary
- Airport type: Public
- Owner: City of New Bedford
- Location: New Bedford, Massachusetts
- Elevation AMSL: 80 ft (24 m)
- Coordinates: 41°40′34″N 070°57′25″W
- Website: flyewb.com

Maps
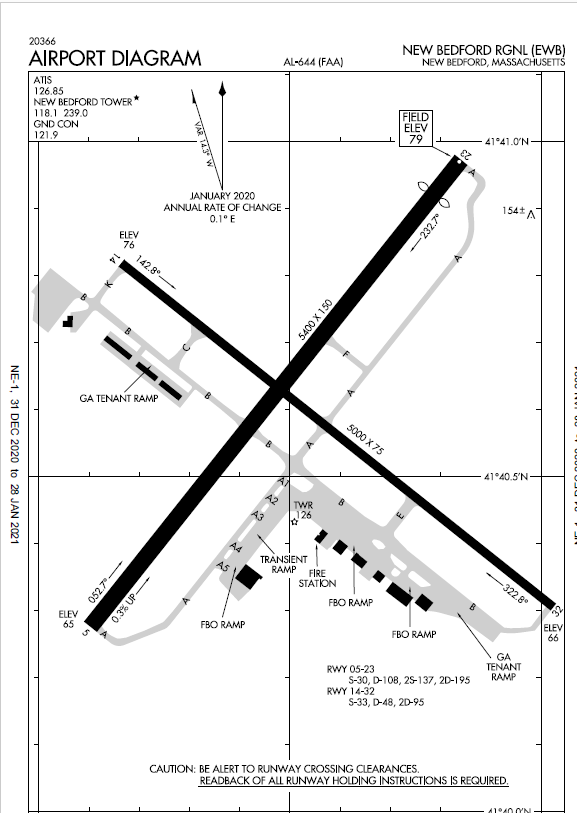
- FAA airport diagram
- Interactive map of New Bedford Regional Airport

Runways
Direction	Length		Surface
Direction	ft	m	Surface
5/23	5,400	1,646	Asphalt
14/32	5,002	1,525	Asphalt

Statistics
- Aircraft operations (2019): 48,988
- Based aircraft (2022): 93
- Source: Federal Aviation Administration

New Bedford Regional Airport (IATA: EWB, ICAO: KEWB, FAA LID: EWB) is a Part 139 Commercial-Service Airport, municipally-owned and available for public use. The airport is located three nautical miles (5.6 km; 3.5 mi) northwest of the city center belonging to the City of New Bedford, a city in Bristol County, Massachusetts, United States.

The airport lies within Class D airspace and has an operating FAA control tower (0600-2300). The Acushnet Cedar Swamp borders the airport to the north.

== History ==
New Bedford Regional Airport was constructed between 1940 and 1942 as a commercial airport, but was soon drafted into use for the United States Army Air Forces until the end of World War II as New Bedford Army Air Field. In April 1944, the Navy took over control of the airport and used it as a training post and naval auxiliary air facility (NAAF New Bedford) to the Naval Air Station Quonset Point in Rhode Island. During its time, the field also had control of Naval Outlying Landing Field Plymouth and Naval Outlying Landing Field Westfield.

After the war ended, the airport was converted back into civilian use. It has been improved over the years with additional runway lighting and approach guidance systems.

Part 139 Certification was received in the summer of 2017, allowing the airport to accept larger passenger aircraft for the purpose of passenger transportation.

=== Historic airline service ===
Northeast Airlines, a major east coast air carrier, provided scheduled airline service throughout the 1950s and 1960s until 1972, when it was acquired by and merged into Delta Air Lines, which in turn then ceased serving New Bedford several years later. In 1960, Northeast was operating Douglas DC-3 aircraft into the airport with nonstop service to New York LaGuardia Airport, Boston and Martha's Vineyard. By 1969, Northeast had introduced larger Fairchild Hiller FH-227 turboprops on nonstop flights to New York LaGuardia, New York JFK Airport and Boston. Northeast then introduced jet service and was operating McDonnell Douglas DC-9-30 jetliners nonstop between New Bedford and New York LaGuardia Airport in the fall of 1970 with two round trip DC-9 flights a day. Following its acquisition of Northeast, Delta continued to serve New Bedford with Fairchild Hiller FH-227 turboprops inherited from Northeast on nonstop flights to New York LaGuardia and Boston during the early and mid-1970s.

Following the cessation of service by Delta during the mid-1970s, Air New England provided regional service throughout New England and New York until it ceased all operations and went out of business. In 1975, Air New England was the only airline serving New Bedford, with a total of up to fourteen nonstop flights a day into the airport from New York LaGuardia, Boston, Hyannis and Martha's Vineyard. These services were operated with Beechcraft 99 and de Havilland Canada DHC-6 Twin Otter commuter turboprops as well as larger Fairchild Hiller FH-227 turboprops and Douglas DC-3 aircraft. By 1979, Air New England had reduced its service into New Bedford and was operating four flights a day with DHC-6 Twin Otter turboprops on nonstop services twice a day to New York LaGuardia and Hyannis. Nor-East Commuter Airlines was also serving New Bedford in 1979 with several nonstop flights a day to Martha's Vineyard, operated with Piper Navajo twin prop aircraft.

Following Air New England, Provincetown-Boston Airlines (PBA) was the primary airline serving New Bedford until 1989, when it ceased all flights into the airport. In 1985, PBA was operating three nonstop flights a day to New York LaGuardia with Embraer EMB-110 Bandeirante commuter turboprops. At the peak of PBA's business, 102,880 passengers passed through its facilities in New Bedford.

In December 2017, Elite Airways offered scheduled flights from New Bedford to Vero Beach, Florida with Bombardier CRJ-200 and -700 series aircraft. However, this service was suspended due a pilot shortage and a limited fleet of aircraft.

== Facilities ==
New Bedford Regional Airport covers an area of 847 acres (343 ha), and contains two asphalt runways: 5/23 measuring 5,400 ft × 150 ft (1,646 m × 46 m) and 14/32 measuring 5,002 ft × 75 ft (1,525 m × 23 m).

In the year ending June 25, 2019, there were 48,988 aircraft operations, an average of 134 per day: 89% general aviation, 10% air taxi and almost 1% military. In April 2022, there were 93 aircraft based at this airport: 75 single-engine, 14 multi-engine, 3 jet and 1 helicopter.

The Main Passenger Terminal offers a TSA Checkpoint and Sterile Areas for baggage and passenger boarding.

U.S. Customs & Border Protection services are available 24/7, by request.

The Airport also has a Foreign Trade Zone (FTZ). The FTZ remains available for development and use on the eastern side of the Airport.

=== Current airline service ===
Cape Air is the primary Air Carrier operating scheduled passenger service at the New Bedford Regional Airport. Destinations include Boston, Martha's Vineyard, Nantucket, and New York's JFK Airport.

The airport reports that its facilities are used by over 20,000 passengers traveling to the islands annually, and in 2019, the Federal Aviation Administration recorded 24,494 itinerant operations from New Bedford to the islands.

=== Fixed-base operators ===
The airport has a thriving general aviation community and is served by three FBOs:

- Colonial Air
- NorEast Aviation Services
- Sandpiper Air

=== Education centers ===
Bridgewater State University Aviation is located on the north side of the Airfield. It is one of the only accredited, collegiate Part 141 Aviation Science programs in New England. The program offers a fleet of over 15 aircraft, state of the art flight simulators, and an experienced faculty/staff. Students can earn Bachelor of Science degrees, with concentrations in Flight Training and/or Aviation Management.

=== Fine dining ===
The Airport Grille opened its doors under new management in October 2019 but closed abruptly during summer 2023. The restaurant offered a range of American-style pasta, steak and seafood dishes, with a focus on lobster. The Airport Grille was located inside the Main Terminal building.

=== Expansion ===
Over the past ten years the FAA, the Massachusetts Aeronautics Commission, and the New Bedford Airport Commission proposed an expansion project to develop New Bedford Regional Airport into an air cargo facility. The recommended expansion plans included a proposal to extend Runway 5–23 to 8,000 ft (2,400 m) from its current length of 5,400 ft (1,600 m). Air cargo carriers require at least 6,000 to 7,000 ft (1,800 to 2,100 m) of runway.

However, despite the economic benefits that a new cargo facility could bring to the area, there was substantial local opposition. Large cargo jets would create more noise and pollution than smaller planes that already utilized the airport. The runway extension itself would affect 17 to 58 acres (6.9 to 23.5 ha) of wetlands. Safety was also of concern, with large aircraft following a flight path directly over populated residential areas.

Due to this opposition, in addition to environmental and safety concerns, the plan to extend the runway was rejected by the Airport Commission on May 4, 2005. The commission voted instead to implement various safety upgrades which included an added 503 feet (153 m) of length.

In 2015, Runway 5/23 was completely rebuilt, with an addition in length of 400 feet (120 m), making the new dimensions 5,400 ft × 150 ft (1,646 m × 46 m). The project also added much needed Runway Safety Areas, putting the runway environment in compliance with modern standards. Taxiway Alpha was also rebuilt at this time, adding Taxiway Safety Areas.

In 2018, Runway 14/32 was narrowed to 75 ft (23 m), but retained its original length of 5,000 ft (1,500 m), while also adding conforming runway safety areas. The project also saw the eradication of the Taxiway B North run-up pad, constructing Taxiway Kilo in its place. In addition, taxiways Echo and Charlie were constructed. Several improvements to taxiway Alpha were also part of this construction phase.

In 2019, the airport was awarded several grants for new wildlife fencing, ARFF equipment, and a supplemental grant of $5 million to design and reconstruct Terminal Aprons. This grant included funding for substructure improvements to assist with drainage.

In 2020, Terminal and FBO Ramps underwent extensive reconstruction, updating substructure, pavement, and ramp markings. In addition, the airport rebuilt several sections of Perimeter Fence, enhancing Security and Wildlife Mitigation measures.

== Airlines and destinations ==
Airlines	Destinations
Cape Air	Martha's Vineyard, Nantucket

Busiest routes from EWB (August 2025 – July 2026)
Rank	City	Passengers	Carrier(s)
1	Nantucket, Massachusetts	1,980	Cape Air
2	Martha's Vineyard, Massachusetts	440	Cape Air

== See also ==
- List of airports in Massachusetts
- List of military installations in Massachusetts
