= Northeast Airlines Flight 258 =

1958 aviation accident

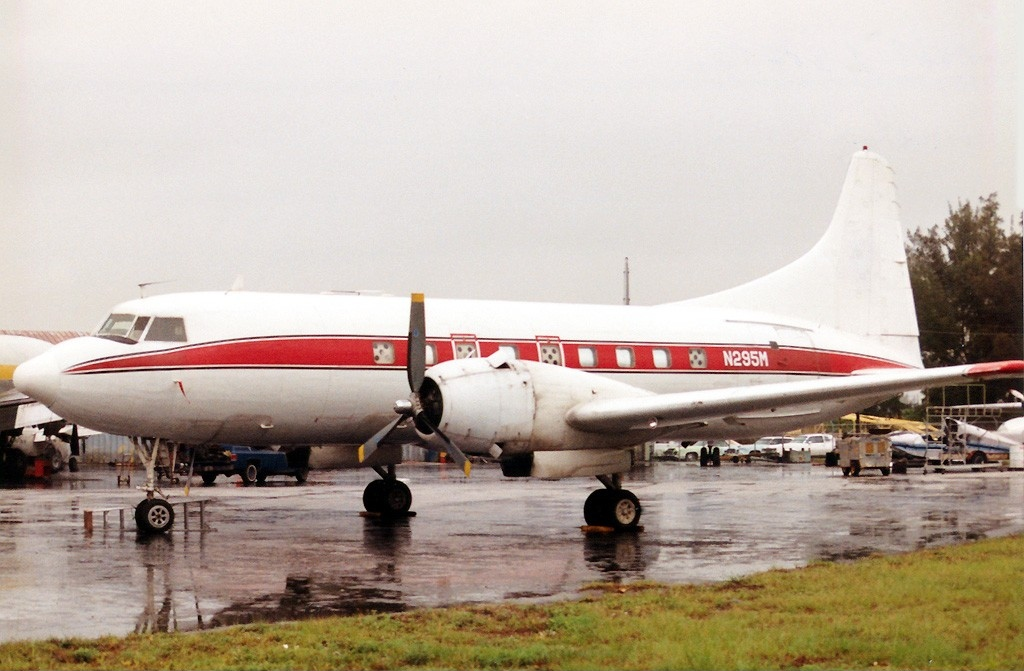
- A Convair CV-240 similar to the accident aircraft

Accident
- Date: August 15, 1958
- Summary: Pilot error
- Site: Near Nantucket Memorial Airport, Massachusetts; 41.2632°N 70.0544°W

Aircraft
- Aircraft type: Convair CV-240
- Operator: Northeast Airlines
- Registration: N90670
- Flight origin: La Guardia Airport, New York City
- Destination: Nantucket Memorial Airport
- Passengers: 31
- Crew: 3
- Fatalities: 25
- Injuries: 9
- Survivors: 9

Northeast Airlines Flight 258 was a scheduled domestic passenger flight from New York's La Guardia Airport that crashed while trying to land at Nantucket Memorial Airport, Massachusetts, at 11:34 on the night of August 15, 1958. All three crew-members and 20 of the 31 passengers were killed, among them Gordon Dean, former chairman of the United States Atomic Energy Commission.

The accident aircraft, a Convair 240 operated by Northeast Airlines, commenced a non-precision VOR approach to the uncontrolled airport despite the fact that visibility, at one-eighth of a mile (0.20 km) in fog, was below the legal minimum required for such an approach. The aircraft flew into the ground one-third of a mile (0.54 km) short of the Runway 24 threshold and some 600 feet (180 m) to the right of the extended center-line. A post-crash fire ensued; most survivors as well as many of the dead were ejected from the wreckage.

A Civil Aeronautics Board (CAB) investigation found that the captain of the aircraft failed to acknowledge transmissions warning him of the deteriorating weather conditions in the minutes before the crash. The CAB also criticised Northeast's training and operational procedures, noting deficiencies in aircrew proficiency, recordkeeping and monitoring of company radio frequencies.

== See also ==
- List of disasters in Massachusetts by death toll
