= Northern Aroostook Regional Airport =

Coordinates: 47°17′08″N 068°18′46″W

- IATA: WFK; ICAO: KFVE; FAA LID: FVE

Summary
- Airport type: Public
- Owner: Northern Aroostook Regional Airport Authority
- Serves: Frenchville, Maine
- Elevation AMSL: 988 ft (301 m)
- Interactive map of Northern Aroostook Regional Airport

Runways
| Direction | Length | | Surface |
| Direction | ft | m | Surface |
|---|---|---|---|
| 14/32 | 4,601 | 1,402 | Asphalt |

Statistics (2005)
- Aircraft operations: 1,400
- Source: Federal Aviation Administration

Northern Aroostook Regional Airport (IATA: WFK, ICAO: KFVE, FAA LID: FVE) is a public airport three miles (5 km) east of the central business district of Frenchville, a town in Aroostook County, Maine, United States. It is owned by the Northern Aroostook Regional Airport Authority.

The airport serves the Madawaska and Fort Kent regions and, to a lesser extent, parts of New Brunswick, Canada.

Although most U.S. airports use the same three-letter location identifier for the FAA and IATA, Northern Aroostook Regional Airport is assigned FVE by the FAA and WFK by the IATA.

== Facilities and aircraft ==
Northern Aroostook Regional Airport covers an area of 533 acres (216 ha) which contains one runway designated 14/32 with a 4,601 x 75 ft (1,402 x 23 m) asphalt surface. For the 12-month period ending December 31, 2005, the airport had 1,400 aircraft operations: 59% general aviation and 41% air taxi.

== History ==
The airport once had scheduled air service to Boston and Portland via Presque Isle on Aroostook Airways in the 1970s, and via Northeast Express Regional Airlines operating as Northwest Airlink in the 1980s and 1990s. Commercial service to Portland International Jetport via Augusta State Airport and Northern Maine Regional Airport at Presque Isle on New England Air Transport began in September 2008.

== See also ==
- List of airports in Maine
