= Northeast Express Regional Airlines =

| IATA | ICAO | Call sign |
|---|---|---|
| NJ | NEE | NORTHEAST |
- Founded: 1978; 48 years ago (as Valley Airlines)
- Ceased operations: 1995; 31 years ago
- Fleet size: See Fleet below
- Destinations: See Former destinations served below
- Headquarters: Manchester, New Hampshire, United States
- Key people: Roland Martin; Allyn Caruso

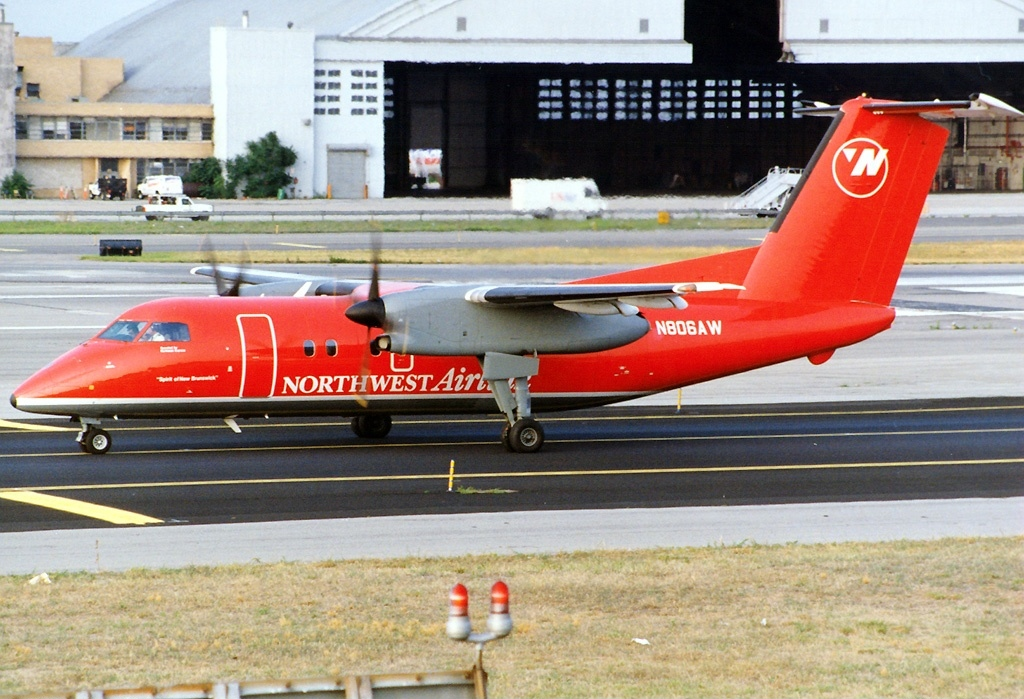
Northeast Express Regional Airlines de Havilland Canada DHC-8 Dash 8 operating Northwest Airlink service

Northeast Express Regional Airlines was a regional airline based in Manchester, New Hampshire. Originally an independent commuter airline in Maine, it was bought by Bar Harbor Airlines and later as part of Eastern Express and Northwest Airlink before being liquidated in 1995.

== History ==
Roland Martin, a businessman in Northern Maine's St. John Valley, founded Valley Airlines in 1978, first as a air taxi operator out of the Northern Aroostook Regional Airport in Frenchville, Maine. Martin, who was one of the founders of the airport, began providing air service between Frenchville and airports in Southern Maine beginning in 1981. In 1986, Martin sold Valley Airlines to Allyn Caruso, CEO of Bar Harbor Airlines.

The acquisition by Bar Harbor Airlines led to Valley Airlines being rebranded as Northeast Express Regional Airlines in 1989 began a partnership with New Hampshire-based Precision Airlines to provide commuter service to Boston Logan International Airport. This partnership provided services for both Eastern Airlines Express and later Continental Express. Following the bankruptcy and liquidation of Eastern Air Lines in 1991, Northeast Express and Precision became a Northwest Airlines codeshare affiliate doing business as Northwest Airlink.

The airline faced financial issues coming into the 1990s. In 1993, the airline moved its maintenance facility from Bangor to Manchester, New Hampshire, resulting in the loss of 45 jobs in the Bangor area. In a fatal blow to the airline, Northwest Airlines decided in 1994 to use the Delta Air Lines-affiliated Business Express Airlines for its Boston feeder services, causing Northeast Express and its sister company Precision Airlines to declare Chapter 11 bankruptcy. At the time of its bankruptcy, the company employed "operate[d] 33 aircraft and employ[ed] more than 550 people" in Maine and New Hampshire. The company's "debts were estimated at $25 million (including about $60,000 owed to Bangor International Airport) compared with the $20 million that the two companies had in assets. Despite Allyn Caruso's attempt to establish a service partnership with USAir, the company was liquidated in 1995.

Former CEO Allyn Caruso would go on to run the MAC Air Group, a fixed base operator out of Portland International Jetport, until his death in 2024. Roland Martin founded Pine State Airlines in 1995, which operated routes in Maine until it was closed in 1998. Martin and his wife were named Citizens of the Year in Frenchville in 2002. Martin died in 2010.

== Former destinations served ==
- Connecticut
  - Hartford (Bradley International Airport)
  - New Haven (Tweed New Haven Airport)
- Maine
  - Augusta (Augusta State Airport)
  - Bangor (Bangor International Airport)
  - Bar Harbor (Hancock County-Bar Harbor Airport)
  - Frenchville (Northern Aroostook Regional Airport)*
  - Lewiston (Auburn/Lewiston Municipal Airport)*
  - Portland (Portland International Jetport) **
  - Presque Isle (Northern Maine Regional Airport)
  - Rockland (Knox County Regional Airport)
  - Waterville (Waterville Robert LaFleur Airport)*
- Massachusetts
  - Boston (Logan International Airport) - HUB
- New Jersey
  - Atlantic City (Atlantic City International Airport)
  - Newark (Newark International Airport)
- New Hampshire
  - Laconia (Laconia Municipal Airport)*
  - Manchester (Manchester Regional Airport)
- New York
  - New York (John F. Kennedy International Airport)
  - New York (LaGuardia Airport)
- Quebec, Canada
  - Quebec City (Québec/Jean Lesage International Airport)

Those airports marked with an asterisk (*) are no longer served by commercial air service.

== Fleet ==
- Beech 99 Airliner
- Fairchild Metroliner III
- De Havilland Canada Dash 8

== See also ==
- List of defunct airlines of the United States
