= Jetport =

Jetport may refer to:

- an alternative term for airport
- Portland International Jetport, serving Portland, Maine, United States, locally known as the Jetport
