= Aroostook Airways =

- Commenced operations: 1969; 56 years ago
- Ceased operations: 1972; 53 years ago
- Destinations: See Destinations served
- Headquarters: Presque Isle, Maine, United States

Aroostook Airways was an airline based in Presque Isle, Maine, United States, from 1969 to 1972. It was established as P & M Flying Services, founded by John C. Philbrick in 1965. It offered commuter airline service throughout Maine, Boston, and Hartford's Bradley International Airport. The airline also offered charter and air ambulance service.

== Destinations ==
- Maine
  - Presque Isle (Northern Maine Regional Airport at Presque Isle) (PQI) Hub
  - Augusta (Augusta State Airport) (AUG)
  - Bangor (Bangor International Airport) (BGR)
  - Madawaska/Fort Kent (Northern Aroostook Regional Airport)* (WFK)
  - Portland (Portland International Jetport) (PWM)
- Connecticut
  - Hartford (Bradley International Airport) (BDL)
- Massachusetts
  - Boston (Logan International Airport) (BOS)

Those airports marked with an asterisk (*) no longer have commercial airline service.

== See also ==
- List of defunct airlines of the United States
