= Northwest Airlines fleet =

List of aircraft operated by Northwest Airlines

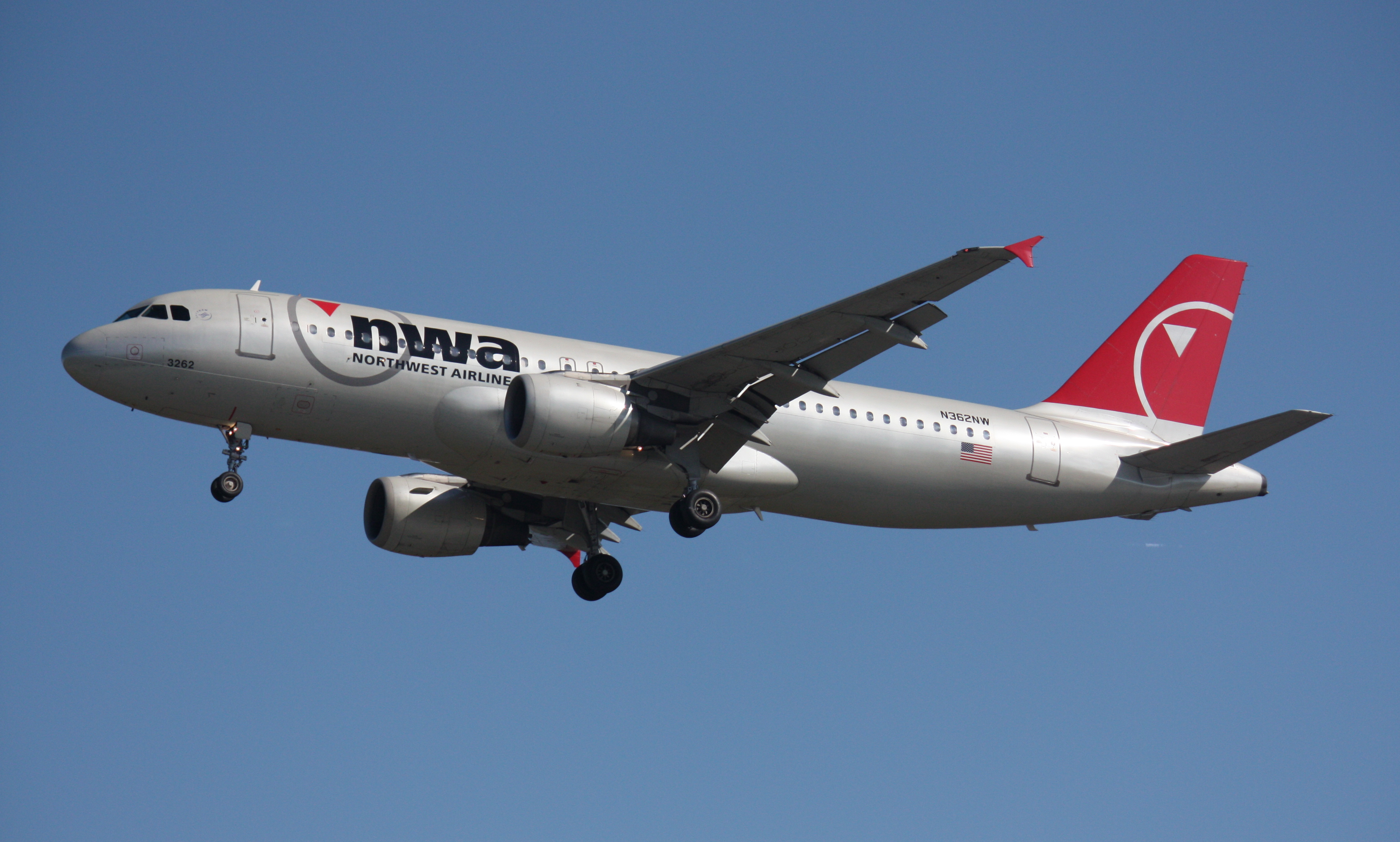
Northwest Airlines Airbus A320

Northwest Airlines was a major United States airline which existed from 1926 until 2010, when it merged with Delta Air Lines and became part of Delta Air Lines' fleet. At the time of the merger, it had a total of 309 aircraft. It was also the last U.S. airline to have a dedicated cargo fleet and routes.

Northwest, unlike Delta, operated a mixed fleet of Boeing, McDonnell Douglas, Airbus and Bombardier. The Boeing 757 was the only type of jet common to the pre-merger fleets of both Delta and Northwest. The airline ceased operations and merged into Delta on January 31, 2010. Most of Northwest's Boeing 747 fleet was sent to Delta which had retired all of its own 747s in the 1970s.

== Final fleet ==
As part of a major fleet renewal program, Northwest introduced a simplified new paint scheme and logo in 2003, emphasizing its callsign (NWA). The airline replaced its McDonnell Douglas DC-10 airliners with the Airbus A330. Its first Airbus A330-300, used initially for European flights, arrived on August 6, 2003. Northwest also flew the longer ranged and slightly shorter A330-200 on some trans-Pacific flights, within the Orient, and on some trans-Atlantic routes. The majority of Northwest's flights between North America and Europe were flown in Airbus A330s. (Northwest became the largest owner and flier of A330s in the world.) Northwest Airlines also possessed the youngest trans-Atlantic fleet of any North American or European airline. Northwest Airlines also began flying reconfigured Boeing 757-200 airliners on some of its European flights carrying fewer passengers. Northwest was one of only two passenger airlines in the United States to fly the Boeing 747-400, with the only other one being United Airlines. One Boeing 747-400 originally destined to fly for Northwest Airlines was sold to United Airlines which was in service until United retired its 747 fleet in 2017.

Northwest was looking for manufacturers to discuss the replacement of their 100, 110 and 125 seat McDonnell Douglas DC-9 aircraft, with an average age of 35 years.

In January 2008, Northwest advised its pilots that the airline planned to cut its fleet of 92 DC-9s to 68 by the end of 2008. Northwest stated that pilot jobs will not be reduced, as they would hire approximately 200–250 pilots by the end of 2008. On April 23, 2008, due to soaring fuel costs from $1.85 in the first quarter of 2007 to $2.77 in the first quarter of 2008, Northwest announced that an additional 15 to 20 aircraft would be removed from its fleet by the end of 2009. The grounded aircraft included ten or so DC-9s, with the balance of the 15 to 20 being a mix of 10 Boeing 757s and 4 Airbus A320s.

The airline's average fleet age was 18.5 years by the end of 2009. The Boeing customer code for Northwest Airlines was 7x7-x51 (i.e. 747-451).

As of October 29, 2008, at the time of the merger with Delta, Northwest Airlines' fleet consisted of the following aircraft:

Northwest Airlines fleet
Aircraft	In service	Orders	Passengers				Notes
Aircraft	In service	Orders	J	F	Y	Total	Notes
Airbus A319-100	57	—	—	16	108	124	All were transferred to Delta Air Lines.
Airbus A320-200	72	—	—	16	132	148	All were transferred to Delta Air Lines.
Airbus A330-200	11	—	32	—	211	243	All were transferred to Delta Air Lines.
Airbus A330-300	21	—	34	—	264	298	All were transferred to Delta Air Lines.
Boeing 747-400	16	—	65	—	338	403	Launch customer. N661US ship 6301, the first 747-400, which had a rudder hardover and an airworthiness directive as Flight 85, is preserved at the Delta Heritage Museum. All were transferred to Delta Air Lines and later retired in 2018.
Boeing 757-200	45	—	—	22	160	182	All were transferred to Delta Air Lines.
Boeing 757-300	16	—	—	24	200	224	All were transferred to Delta Air Lines.
Boeing 787-8	—	18	48	—	154	202	Orders were transferred to Delta Air Lines, but were later cancelled in 2016. Delta would go on to order 30 787-10 with 30 additional options. Deliveries are expected to arrive in 2031.
McDonnell Douglas DC-9-30	30	—	—	16	84	100	All were transferred to Delta Air Lines and later retired in 2010. Never wore Delta livery.
McDonnell Douglas DC-9-40	7	—	—	16	94	110	All were transferred to Delta Air Lines and later retired in 2011. Never wore Delta livery.
McDonnell Douglas DC-9-50	34	—	—	16	109	125	All were transferred to Delta Air Lines and later retired in 2014.
Total	309	18					

== Fleet gallery ==
Hover over each photo to view label detail

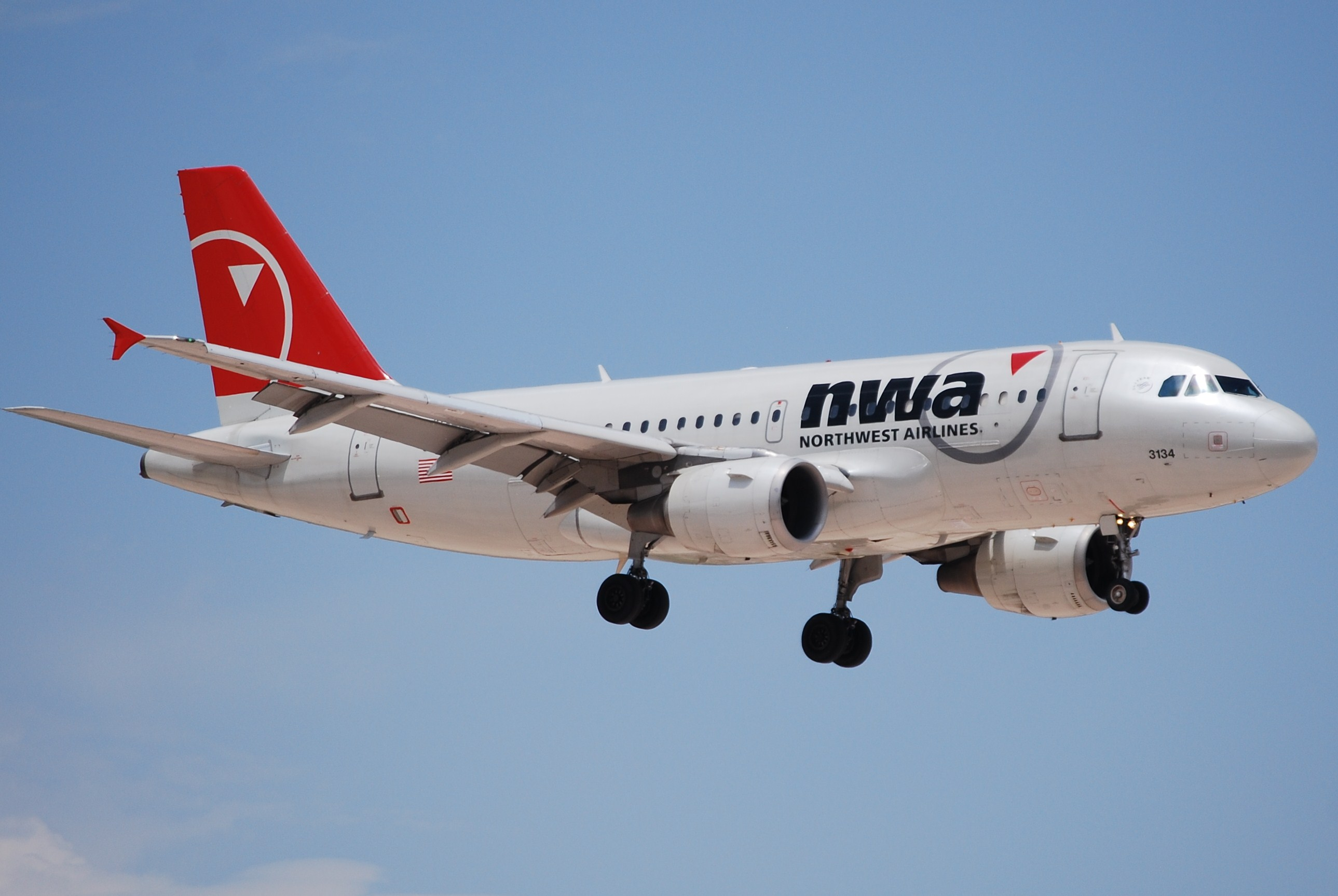
Airbus A319-100

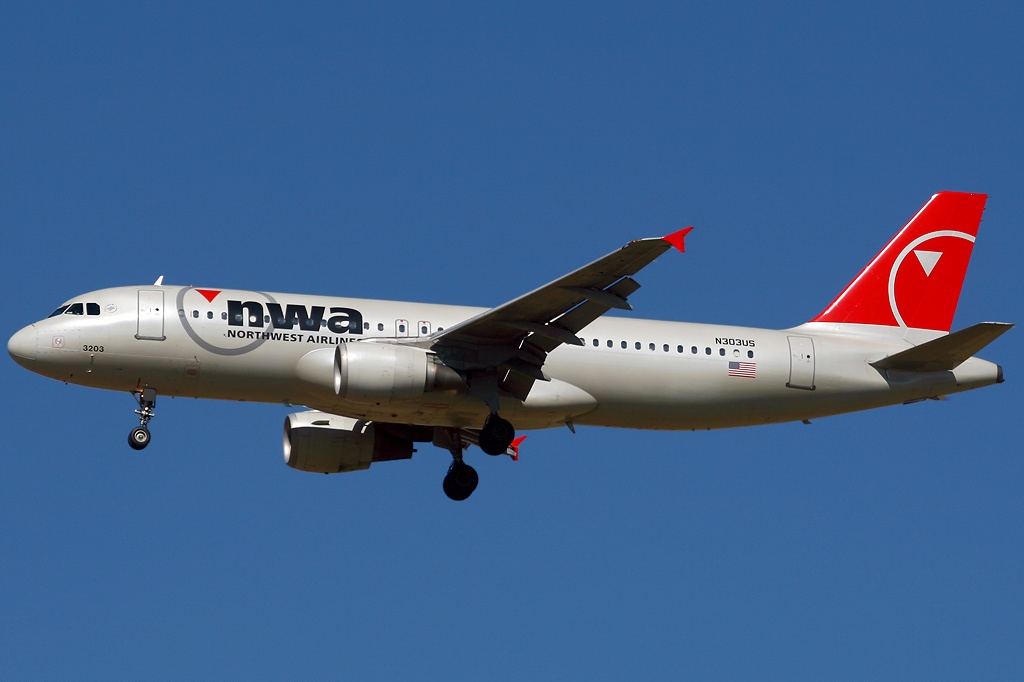
Airbus A320-200

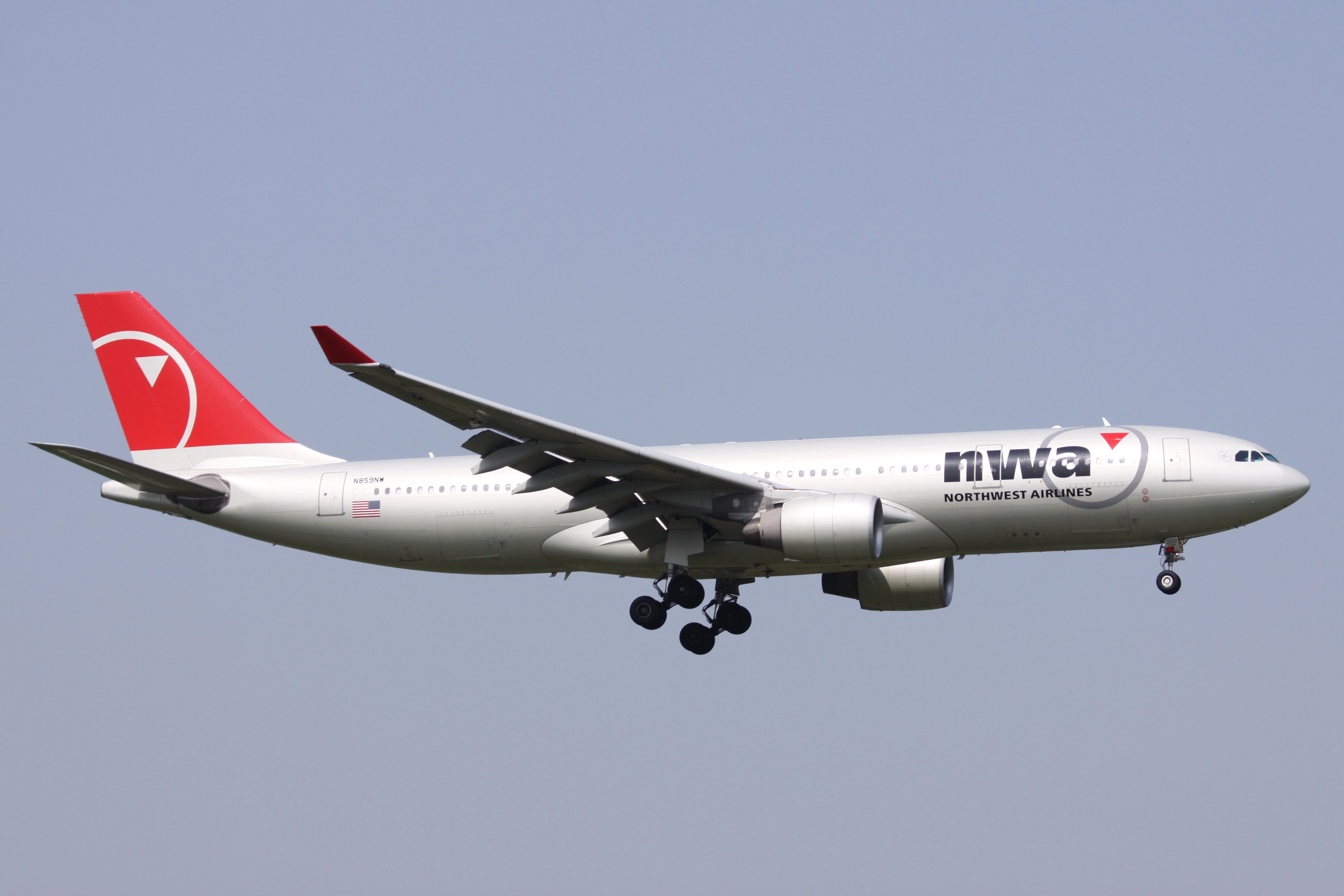
Airbus A330-200

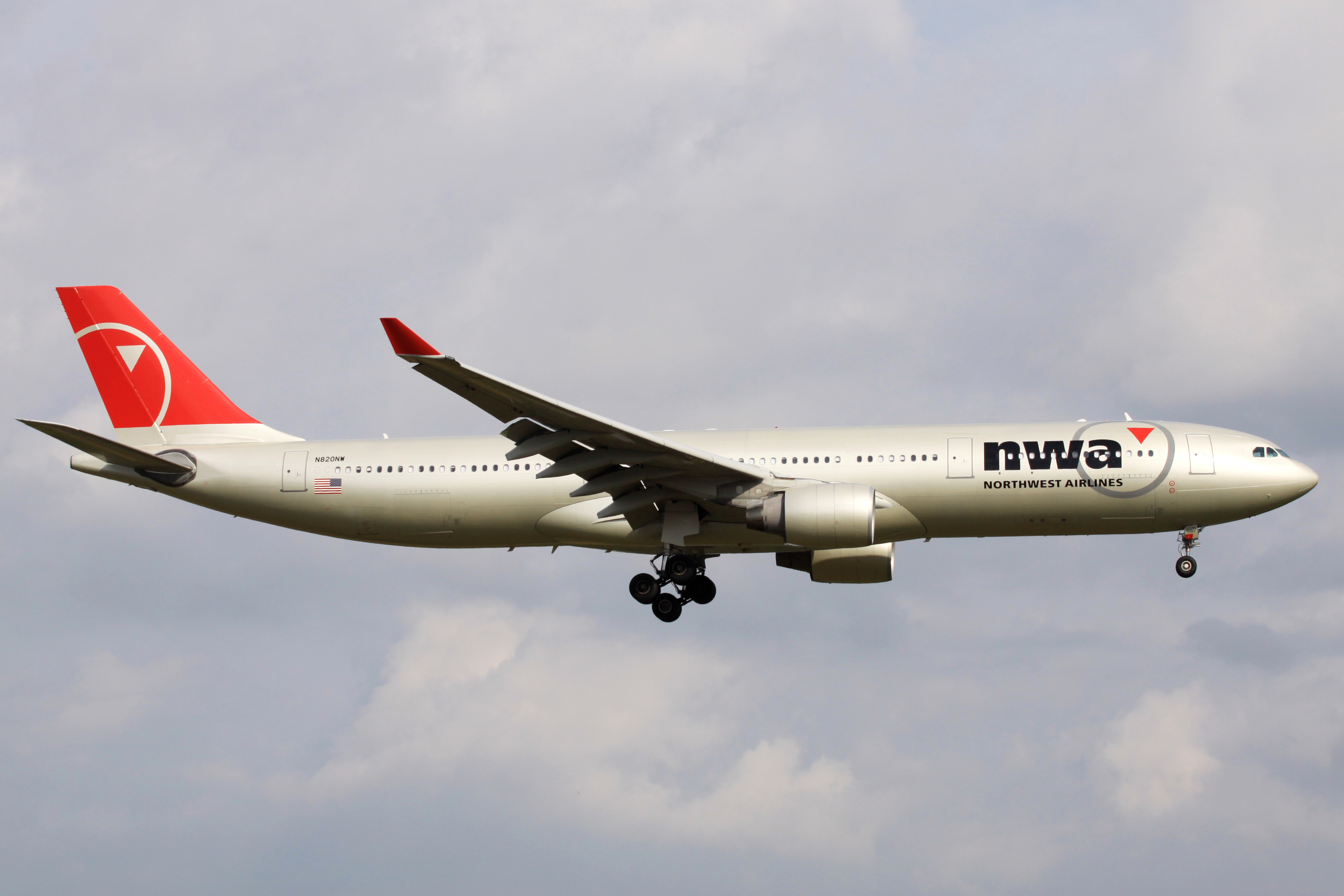
Airbus A330-300

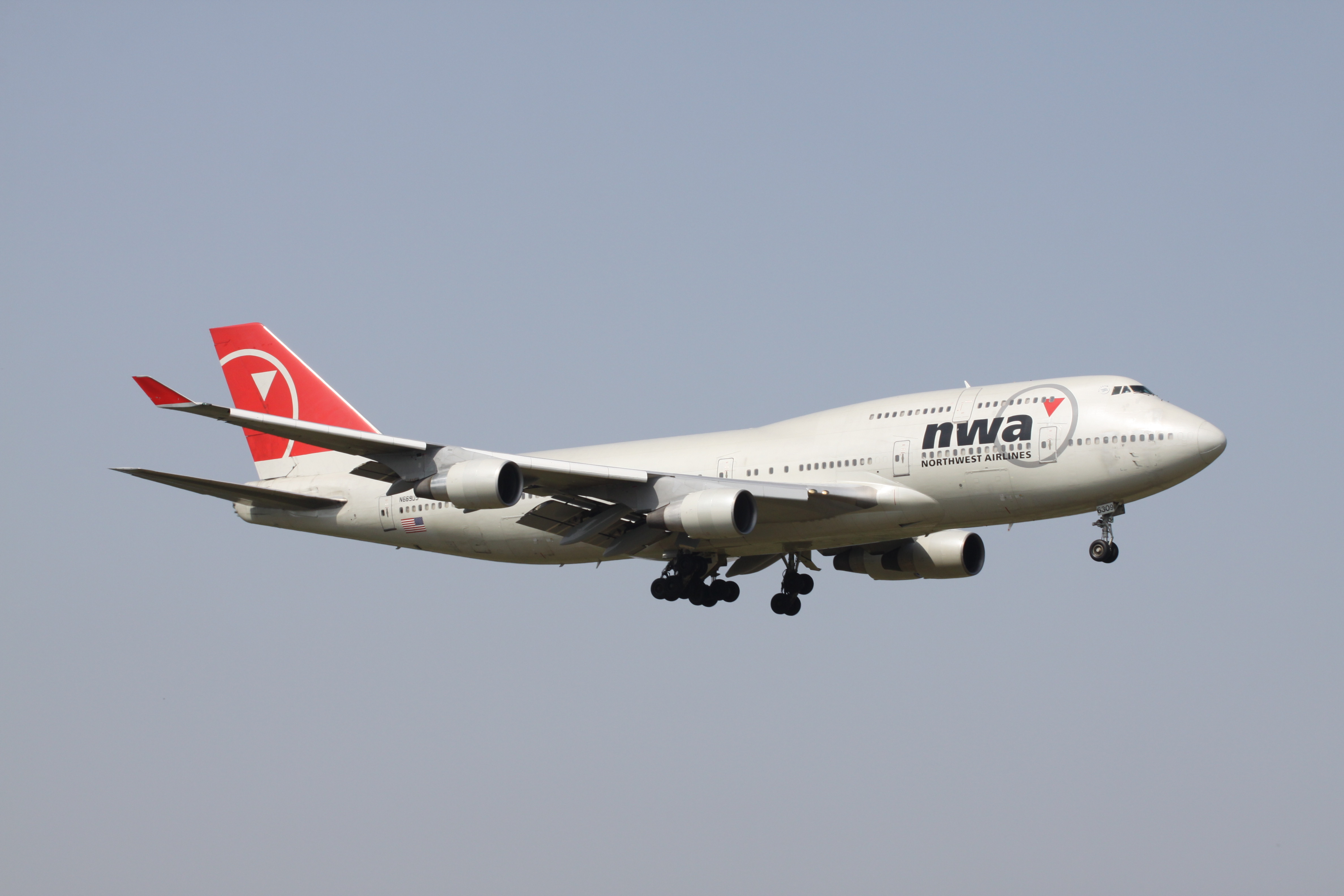
Boeing 747-400

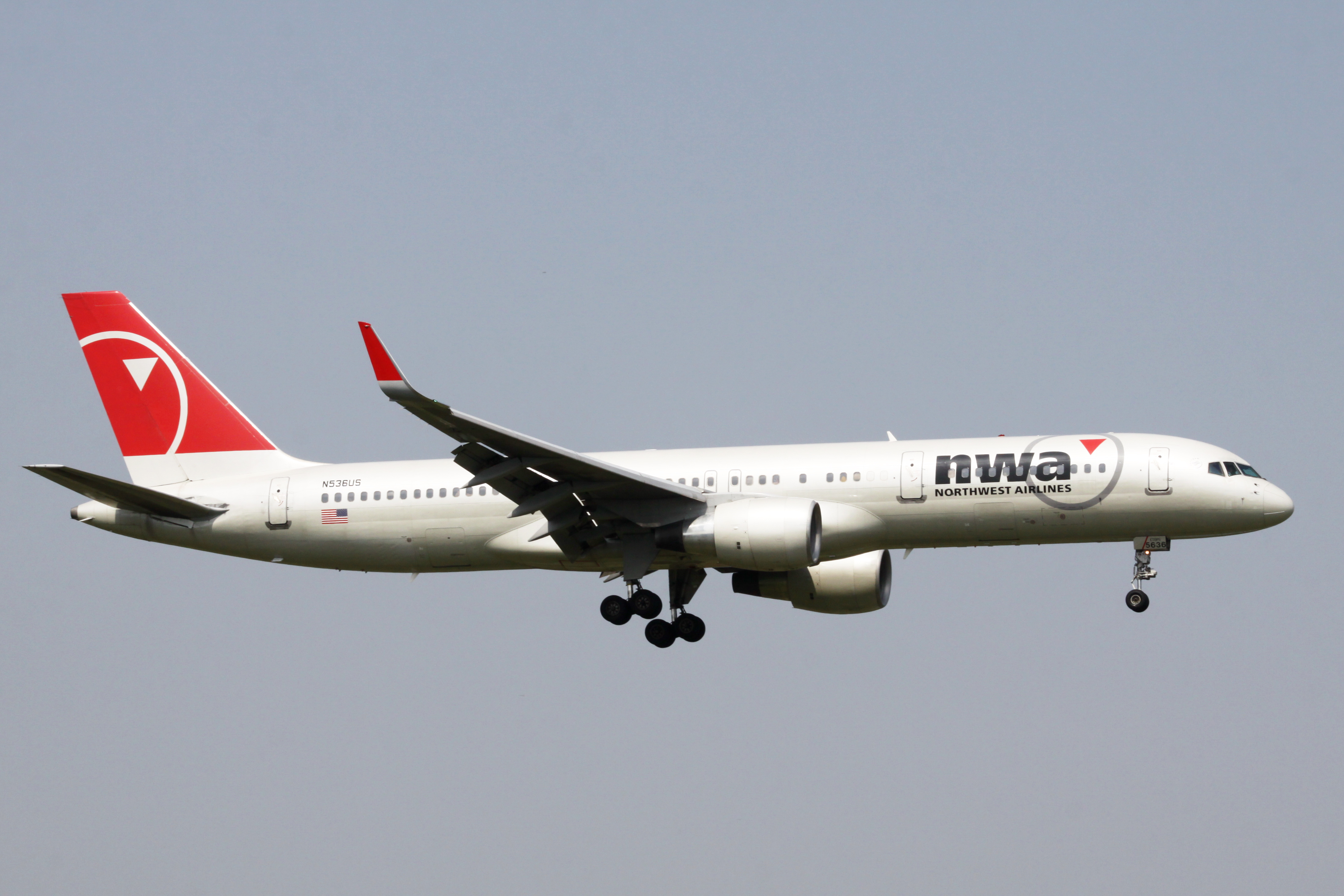
Boeing 757-200

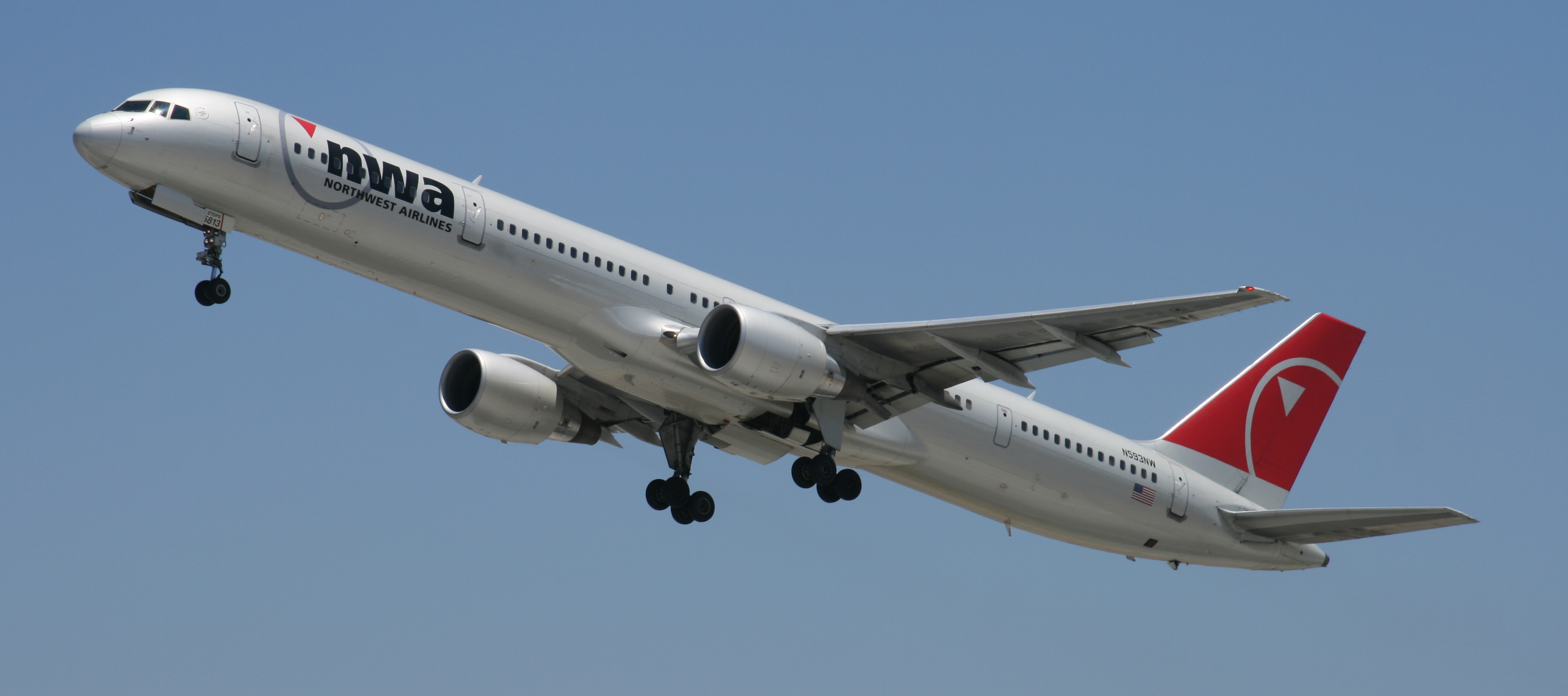
Boeing 757-300

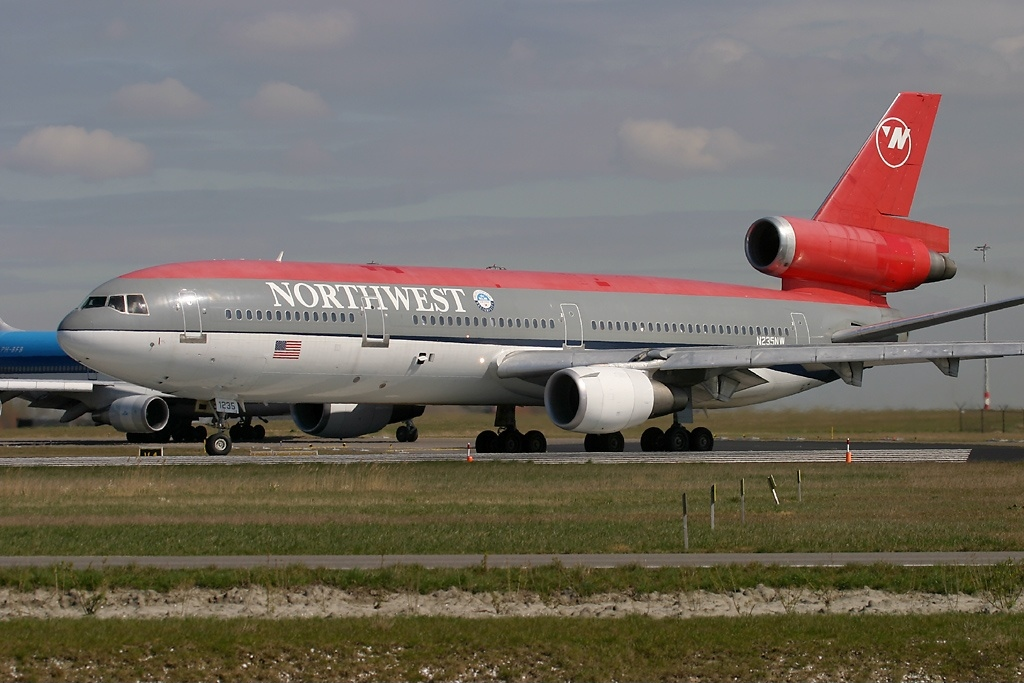
McDonnell Douglas DC-10-30

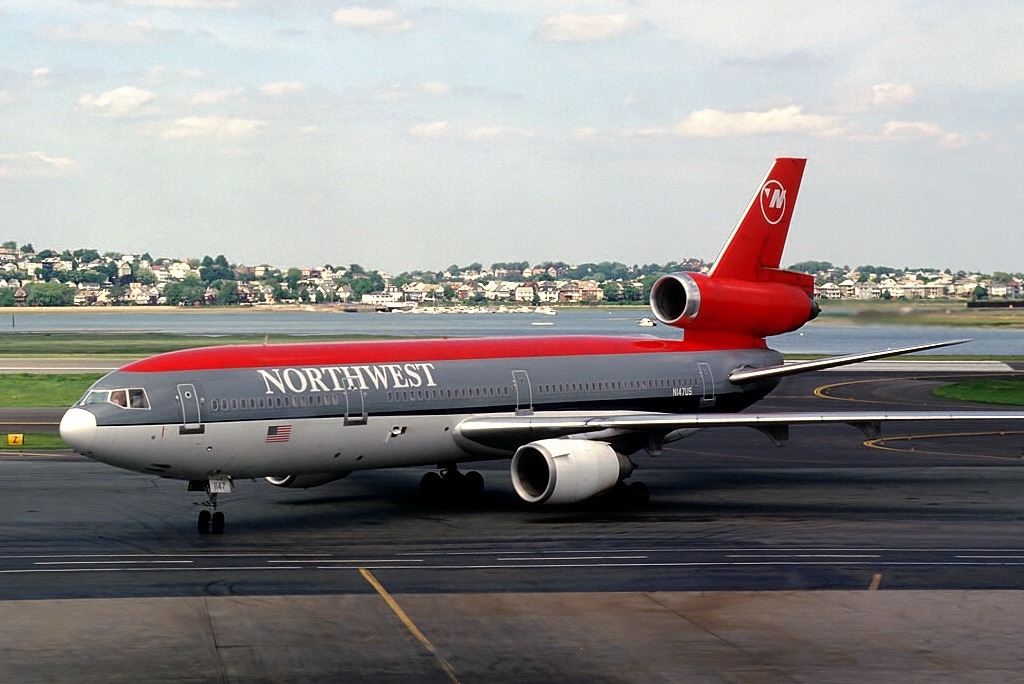
McDonnell Douglas DC-10-40

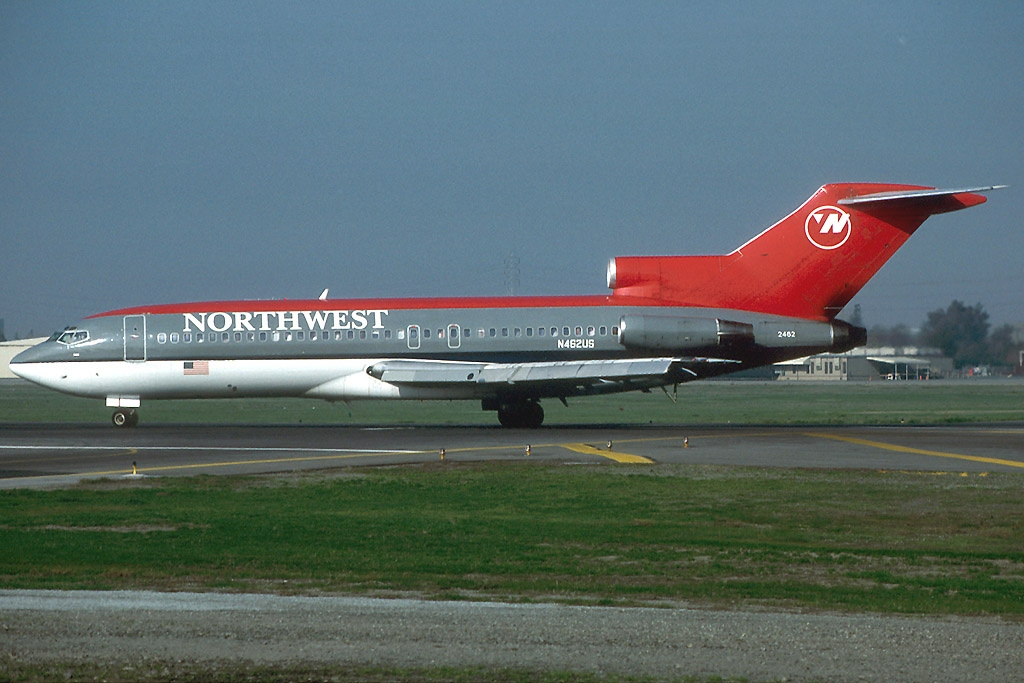
Boeing 727-51

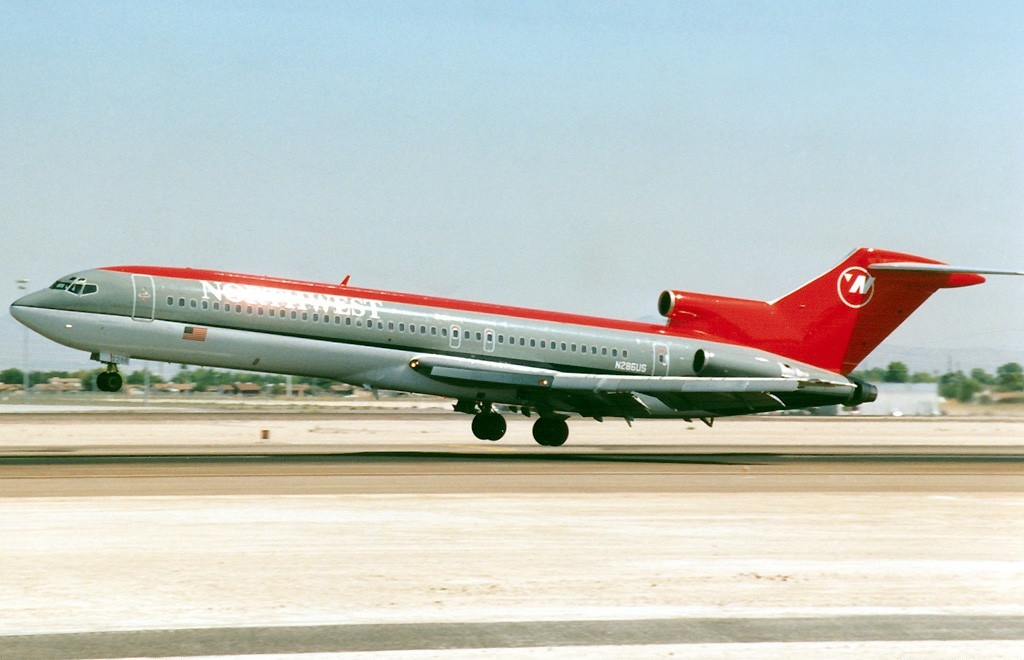
Boeing 727-251

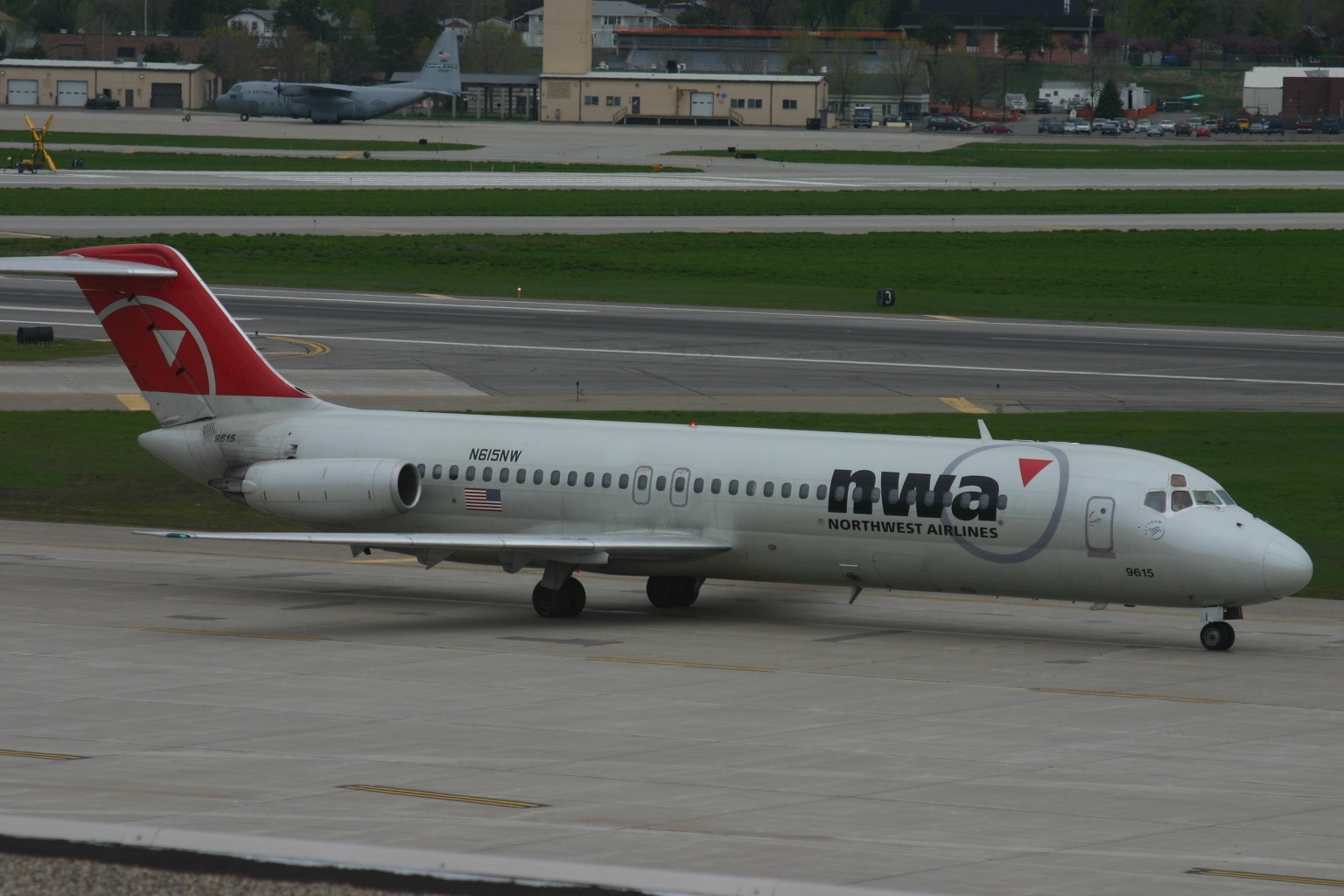
McDonnell Douglas DC-9-30

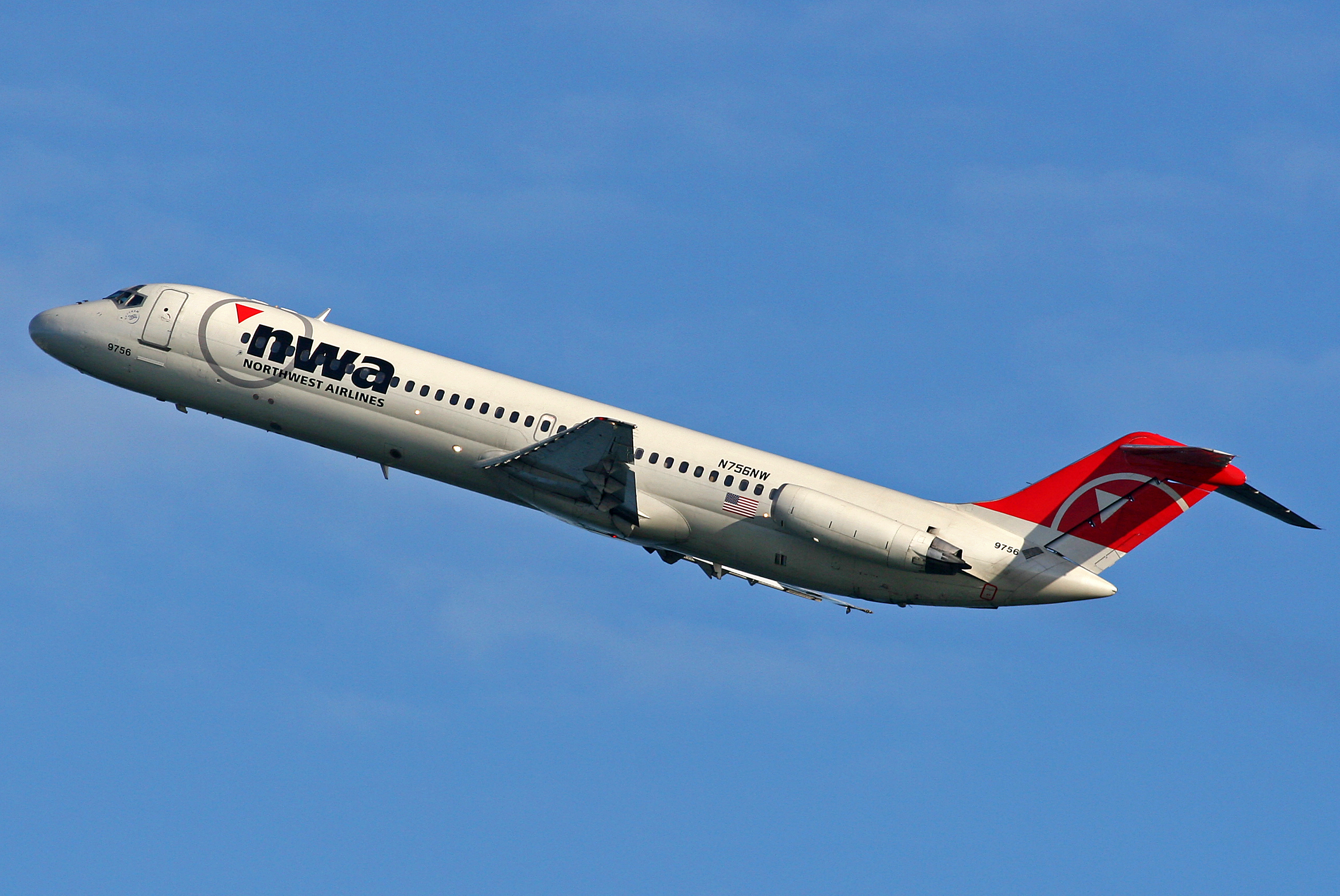
McDonnell Douglas DC-9-40

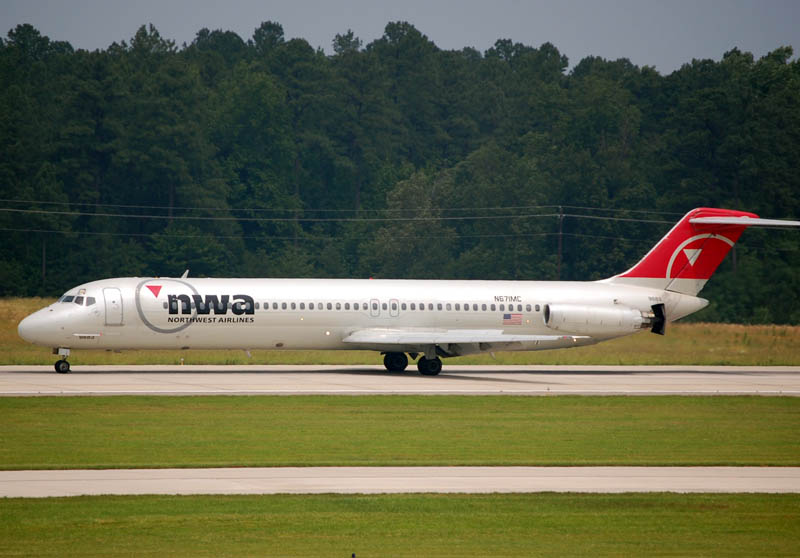
McDonnell Douglas DC-9-50

== Retired fleet ==
Northwest Airlines previously operated the following aircraft:

Northwest Airlines retired fleet
Aircraft	Total	Introduced	Retired	Notes
Boeing 377 Stratocruiser	10	1949	1960	
Boeing 707-320B	5	1963	1971	
Boeing 707-320C	30	1964	1978	
Boeing 720B	17	1961	1974	
Boeing 727-100	36	1964	1991	
Boeing 727-200	82	1968	2003	
Boeing 747-100	12	1970	1998	
Boeing 747-200	24	1971	2007	
Convair CV-580	14	1986	1994	Former Republic Airlines fleet.
Curtiss C-46 Commando	10	1942	Unknown	Leased from the United States Army Air Force.
Douglas C-47 Skytrain	20	1944	1958	
Douglas C-54 Skymaster	40	1946	1961	
Douglas DC-3A	13	1939	1950	
Douglas DC-4	4	1947	1961	
Douglas DC-6A	7	1953	1963	
Douglas DC-6B	17	1954	1965	
Douglas DC-7C	17	1957	1968	
Douglas DC-8-32	5	1960	1964	
Ford 5-AT TriMotor	5	1928	1935	
Lockheed L-9 Orion	3	1931	1933	
Lockheed L-10 Electra	15	1934	1943	
Lockheed L-14 Super Electra	9	1937	1939	
Lockheed L-188C Electra	18	1959	1972	
Lockheed L-1049G Super Constellation	4	1955	1958	
Martin 2-0-2	25	1947	1952	
McDonnell Douglas DC-9-14	21	1986	2005	Former Republic Airlines fleet.
McDonnell Douglas DC-9-15	8	1986	2005	Former Republic Airlines fleet.
McDonnell Douglas DC-9-15RC	5	1986	1993	Former Republic Airlines fleet.
McDonnell Douglas DC-10-30	21	1991	2007	Sold to ATA Airlines and Omni Air International.
McDonnell Douglas DC-10-30ER	3	1998	2006	Sold to ATA Airlines and Omni Air International.
McDonnell Douglas DC-10-40	22	1973	2002	
McDonnell Douglas MD-82	9	1986	1999	Former Republic Airlines fleet. One crashed as Flight 255.
Sikorsky S-38	3	1931	1935	

== NWA Fleet in 1960 ==
Northwest Orient Airlines fleet in 1960
Aircraft	Total	Orders	Notes
Boeing 377	8	0	
Douglas DC-3	4	0	
Douglas DC-6A	7	0	
Douglas DC-6B	17	0	
Douglas DC-7C	17	0	
Douglas DC-8	0	5	First jet aircraft type operated by the airline.
Lockheed L-188	0	18	First turboprop aircraft type operated by the airline.
Total	53	23	

Prior to 1960, Northwest operated several other types of piston powered propeller airliners including Lockheed L-10 Electra, Lockheed L-14 Super Electra, Lockheed Constellation (L-1049G model) and Martin 2-0-2 aircraft.

== NWA Fleet in 1970 ==
Northwest Orient Airlines fleet in 1970
Aircraft	Total	Orders	Notes
Boeing 707-300B	10	0	
Boeing 707-300C	26	0	
Boeing 720B	16	0	
Boeing 727-100	30	0	
Boeing 727-200	34	0	
Boeing 747-100	0	15	
Boeing 2707	0	0	6 Options
McDonnell Douglas DC-10-40	0	14	
Total	116	29	

== NWA Fleet in 1980 ==
Northwest Airlines fleet in 1980
Aircraft	Total	Orders	Notes
Boeing 727-100	4	0	
Boeing 727-100C	12	0	
Boeing 727-200	46	4	
Boeing 747-100	12	0	
Boeing 747-200B	11	1	
Boeing 747-200F	4	1	
McDonnell Douglas DC-10-40	22	0	
Total	111	6	

== NWA Fleet in 1990 ==
Northwest Airlines fleet in 1990
Aircraft	Total	Orders	Notes
Airbus A320-200	6	19	
Airbus A330	0	16	
Airbus A340	0	20	
Boeing 727-100	9	0	
Boeing 727-200	62	0	
Boeing 747-100	12	0	
Boeing 747-200B	20	0	
Boeing 747-200F	8	0	
Boeing 747-400	10	2	
Boeing 757-200	33	40	
McDonnell Douglas DC-9-10	20	0	
McDonnell Douglas DC-9-30	77	0	
McDonnell Douglas DC-9-50	28	0	
McDonnell Douglas DC-10-40	20	0	
McDonnell Douglas MD-82	8	0	
Total	323	105	

== NWA Fleet in 2000 ==
Northwest Airlines fleet in 2000
Aircraft	Total	Orders	Notes
Airbus A319-100	12	56	82 Options
Airbus A320-200	70	12	
Airbus A330-300	0	16	
Boeing 727-200 Adv	31	0	
Boeing 747-100	1	0	
Boeing 747-200B	21	0	
Boeing 747-200F	12	0	
Boeing 747-400	14	0	
Boeing 757-200	48	25	
McDonnell Douglas DC-9-10	10	0	
McDonnell Douglas DC-9-30	115	0	
McDonnell Douglas DC-9-40	12	0	
McDonnell Douglas DC-9-50	35	0	
McDonnell Douglas DC-10-30	22	0	
McDonnell Douglas DC-10-40	21	0	
McDonnell Douglas MD-82	8	0	
Total	430	127	

== Northwest Airlink fleet ==
According to the Northwest Airlines historical website, a number of regional and commuter air carriers operated service as Northwest Airlink over the years via respective code sharing agreements to include the following airlines and aircraft types:

- Big Sky Airlines - British Aerospace BAe Jetstream 31, Swearingen Metro
- Compass Airlines - Canadair CRJ200/CRJ440, Embraer 175
- Eugene Aviation Service - Piper PA-23
- Express Airlines I/II - British Aerospace BAe Jetstream 31, Canadair CRJ200/CRJ440, Saab 340
- Fischer Brothers Aviation - CASA 212, Dornier 228, Short 360
- Mesaba Airlines - Avro RJ85, Beechcraft 99, Canadair CRJ200/CRJ440/CRJ900, de Havilland Canada DHC-8 Dash 8, Fokker F27, Saab 340, Swearingen Metro
- Northeast Express Regional Airlines - de Havilland Canada DHC-8 Dash 8, Swearingen Metro
- Pacific Island Aviation - Short 360
- Pinnacle Airlines - Canadair CRJ200/CRJ440/CRJ900, Saab 340
- Precision Airlines - Beechcraft 99, Dornier 228

== Northwest Cargo ==
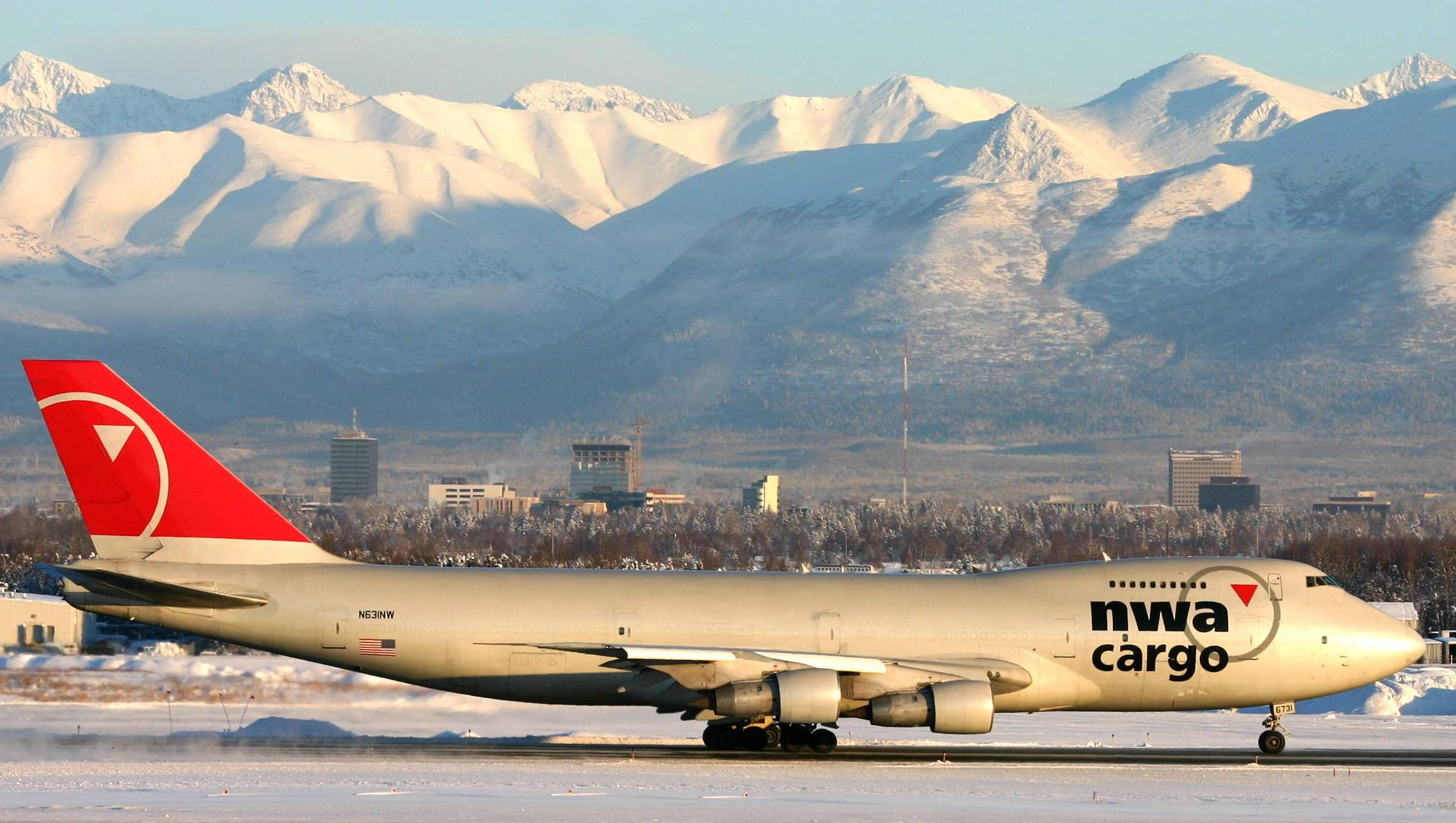
A Northwest Cargo Boeing 747-200F at Ted Stevens Anchorage International Airport, Alaska, United States. (2008)

As of 2006, Northwest Cargo was the largest cargo carrier among U.S. combination passenger and cargo airlines. Northwest Cargo's fleet of 15 dedicated Boeing 747 freighter aircraft flew from key cities throughout the United States and Asia and connected the carrier's cargo hub in Anchorage, Alaska, United States (Ted Stevens Anchorage International Airport), facilitating the quick transfer of cargo between large cities on both sides of the Pacific. Northwest Cargo also transported freight aboard the passenger fleet of Northwest Airlines to more than 250 cities worldwide.

As of early 2008, Northwest's largest cargo client was DHL International. In December 2007, Northwest announced that DHL International would terminate its cargo agreement with the airline effective late 2008. According to NWA Chief Financial Officer Dave Davis, the loss of its largest cargo client would bring significant changes to the division.

Northwest Cargo served airports and routes not served by the passenger operation — the last U.S. carrier to maintain a separate fleet and route network exclusively for cargo. Such cargo-only cities on Northwest's route map included Wilmington, Ohio, and cargo only routes included Chicago, Illinois to Anchorage, Alaska.

On April 21, 2009, Delta announced they were grounding 8 of their Boeing 747-200 freighter aircraft on December 31, 2009. The last flight of a dedicated cargo aircraft was December 26, 2009. Currently, Delta maintains freight activity on some of their passenger aircraft's lower deck.

Northwest Cargo fleet
Aircraft	Total	Routes	Notes
Boeing 747-200F	15	Freight	
