= Twin Cities Air Service =

FBO and airline in Auburn, Maine

| IATA | ICAO | Call sign |
|---|---|---|
| — | TCY | TWIN CITY |
- Founded: 1992
- Ceased operations: unknown (after 2012)
- Hubs: Auburn/Lewiston Municipal Airport
- Focus cities: Portland International Jetport
- Fleet size: 5
- Destinations: 2
- Headquarters: Auburn, Maine
- Website: http://www.twincitiesairservice.com

Twin Cities Air Service was an American fixed-base operator and charter airline based at Auburn, Maine and operated from Auburn/Lewiston Municipal Airport and the Portland International Jetport. The airline was a certified Part 135 operator, provided on demand and commuter service, while the FBO provided standard aircraft services and maintenance, specializing in overhauls of the Cessna 400 series aircraft. Beginning in March 2010, Twin Cities Air Service began a scheduled commuter route between Portland, Maine, and Yarmouth, Nova Scotia. At the time of the initiation of this route, Twin Cities was the only scheduled carrier into the Yarmouth Airport, and was the only scheduled international service into the Portland International Jetport.

== History ==
Twin Cities Air Service was founded in 1992 as a fixed-base operator at the Auburn airport. The company has since expanded to include on demand air charter services, airframe maintenance and support, and scheduled international air service. Ch-aviation stated "Out of Business", the last change on the Website was 2012, it seems the company has ceased.

== Fleet ==
Twin Cities Air Service currently operated a fleet of five aircraft. The majority of these aircraft are available for on-demand charter operations throughout the Northeastern United States, although the aircraft are certified to operate in Canada, Bermuda, and parts of The Caribbean and Central America. A single Cessna aircraft is devoted to the scheduled service between Portland, Maine and Yarmouth, Nova Scotia.

As of March 2010 the Twin Cities fleet includes:

- 1 Beechcraft King Air 200
- 1 Cessna 310
- 3 Cessna 402 Utililiner
- 1 Gates Learjet 35A
