= Frenchville Railroad Station and Water Tank =

- U.S. National Register of Historic Places
- U.S. Historic district
- Location within Maine Location within the United States
- Location: 308 US 1, Frenchville, Maine
- Coordinates: 47°16′47″N 68°23′20″W
- Area: less than one acre
- Built: 1910
- NRHP reference No.: 95000723
- Added to NRHP: June 20, 1995

The Frenchville Railroad Station and Water Tank are a historic railroad museum property in Frenchville, Maine. The station and water tank were built in 1910 by the Bangor & Aroostook Railroad (B&A) and were added to the National Register of Historic Places on June 20, 1995. The station was retired in 1971. The water tower became obsolete in 1958 when the diesel locomotive replaced the steam locomotive. The Town of Frenchville purchased the water tank from Bangor & Aroostook Railroad and used it as a water reservoir for the fire department until 1981. The Frenchville Historical Society took over maintenance of the site in 1985.

== Description and history ==
The former Frenchville Railroad Station is located between United States Route 1 and the railroad tracks of the Bangor and Aroostook Railroad, west of the junction of US 1 and Maine State Route 162. The station is a small rectangular wood frame building with a broadly-overhanging gable roof and weatherboard siding. The building is divided into three sections: a central agent's room, a freight area to the east, and a passenger area to the west. The inside walls are finished with pine wainscoting and decorative metal, which is continued onto the ceiling. The station was built c. 1910 by the B&A, and remained in service until 1971.

Immediately east of the station is a short isolated section of track, on which stands a caboose. It is 51 feet 8.5 inches (15.761 m) in length, and was built by the Pullman Company as a troop transport car in December 1943. It was acquired by the B&A in 1949 and refitted as a caboose, remaining in service until 1981. It was donated to the Frenchville Historical Society in 1988.

Beyond the caboose stands a green water tower, about 40 feet (12 m) high and 20 feet (6.1 m) in diameter. It has an octagonal wooden base sheathed in weatherboard and set on a concrete pad. The tank is supported by a heavy timber frame, and is structurally reinforced by fifteen steel rods. The structure is topped by a polygonal roof. It was built c. 1910, and served the railroad as a water source for its steam engines until 1958, when the line was converted to diesel power. The town purchased the tank, and used it as a water reservoir for its fire department until 1981. Its maintenance was taken over by local citizens in 1985, and it is now owned by the Frenchville Historical Society.

== See also ==
- National Register of Historic Places listings in Aroostook County, Maine
