= Portland International Jetport =

Airport in Portland, Maine, USA

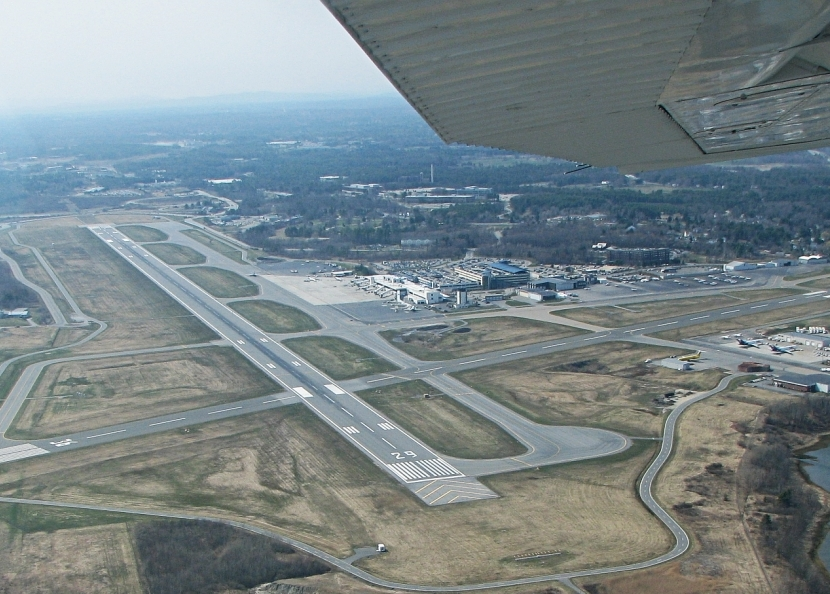
- The jetport in 2008, looking west
- IATA: PWM; ICAO: KPWM; FAA LID: PWM

Summary
- Airport type: Public
- Owner/Operator: City of Portland
- Serves: State of Maine
- Location: Portland, Maine, U.S.
- Opened: August 1, 1931
- Elevation AMSL: 76 ft (23 m)
- Coordinates: 43°38′46″N 070°18′33″W
- Website: www.portlandjetport.org

Maps
- FAA airport diagram
- Interactive map of Portland International Jetport

Runways
| Direction | Length | | Surface |
| Direction | ft | m | Surface |
|---|---|---|---|
| 11/29 | 7,200 | 2,195 | Asphalt |
| 18/36 | 6,100 | 1,859 | Asphalt |

Statistics (2025)
- Total passengers: 2,593,067
- Passenger Enplanements: 1,297,966
- Aircraft operations (2024): 55,874
- Cargo handled (2023): 23,753,470 lbs.
- Source: FAA and Portland Jetport.

Portland International Jetport (IATA: PWM, ICAO: KPWM, FAA LID: PWM), locally known as the Jetport, is a public airport two miles (3 km) west of downtown Portland, Maine, United States. It is owned and operated by the City of Portland. A portion of the Jetport's property, including the main runway, is located within the neighboring city of South Portland. PWM covers 726 acres (293 ha) of land.

The airport is the busiest in the state. In 2024, the Jetport handled approximately 2.44 million passengers, setting a new annual record and continuing the growth trend that began when the airport first exceeded two million passengers in 2018.

The Jetport has benefited from service by low-cost carriers such as Southwest Airlines, JetBlue, and Breeze Airways, as well as Portland's increased popularity as a tourist destination. Multiple carriers have expanded service to the airport in recent years, with United Airlines adding seasonal service to Houston in 2025 and Avelo Airlines beginning service to New Haven, Connecticut. A survey conducted in June 2011 found PWM to be the most affordable airport in the region, and the third-most-affordable in New England.

In October 2011, PWM completed a $75 million renovation and expansion of its terminal to allow more airline service and more amenities for passengers. More recent infrastructure improvements include taxiway lighting upgrades completed in 2024 and federal funding received in 2020 for a 1,200 ft-long (370 m) taxiway connecting runways.

== History ==
=== Early years ===
The airfield was founded in the late 1920s by Dr. Clifford "Kip" Strange, who needed space for his JN-4 "Jenny" Biplane. Known as Stroudwater Airport, the airport received its first commercial service on August 1, 1931, when Boston-Maine Airways began a flight from Portland to Boston. In 1937 the city of Portland purchased the airfield for $68,471 and changed its name to Portland-Westbrook Municipal Airport; this is the origin of its airport code, PWM. "Westbrook" referred to the location of the last directional light before the airport in the nearby city of Westbrook.

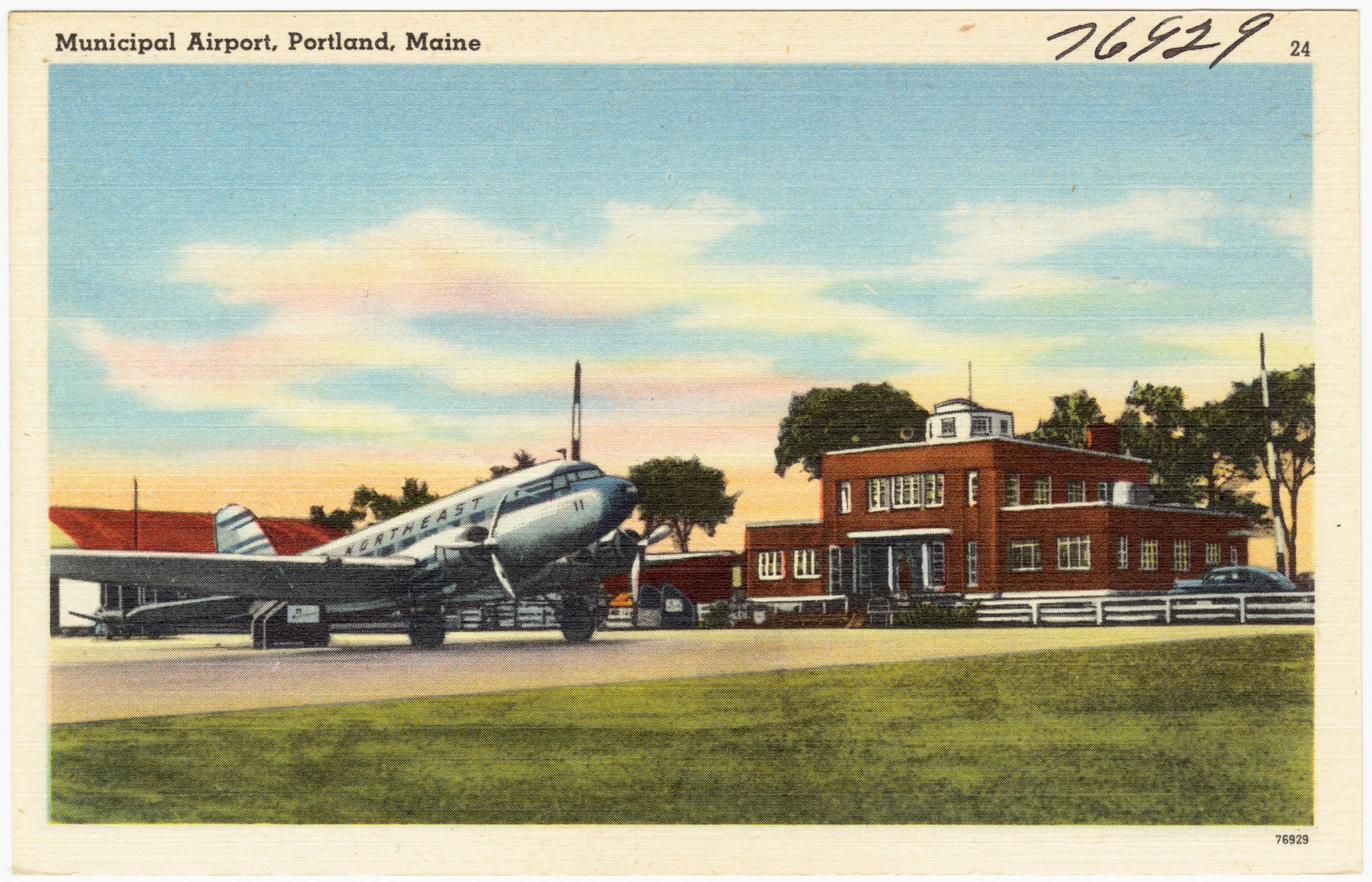
Postcard view c. 1940s

In January 1934, a statewide airport survey was conducted by Captain Harry M. Jones, of the Maine Emergency Relief Administration (MERA), a state division of the Federal New Deal public works programs launched in November 1933. MERA expended $816,376 across the state on labor in airport construction in the period April 1934 to July 1935. Two runways were constructed at Portland Municipal Airport by MERA, one north–south 2,400'x 100' gravel runway and one east–west 1,500'x 100' gravel runway. In the summer of 1935, the MERA aviation program had made possible the extension of the Boston-Portland-Augusta-Waterville-Bangor mail service to Bar Harbor, where an airport, Hancock County–Bar Harbor Airport, had been constructed by the MERA. The Portland town report of 1938 reported that the building of the runways and grading of the field were by WPA labor, and the city furnished part of the material. In 1940, the Works Progress Administration (WPA) built Portland's first real terminal, a brick structure that is now the general-aviation terminal.

According to Portland Town Reports, the WPA conducted two projects sponsored by the city:

- "Improve municipal airport", official project number: 165‐1‐11‐111, total project cost: $669,295
- "Complete construction of airport", official project number: 65‐1‐11‐2213, total project cost: $93,335

The present airport started to take shape in the 1950s. The March 1951 chart shows runway 1 4260 ft long, runway 10 2900 ft, and runway 15 4010 ft. Runway 11/29 was built in 1957 and lengthened to 6,800 feet (2,073 m) in 1966. The current terminal opened in 1968, when jet flights began.

=== 1960s – 1970s ===
Northeast Airlines long had a monopoly on commercial air travel in Portland, dating to its time as Boston-Maine Airways. Another airline emerged in 1962, when Atlantic Airways began service to Boston's Logan International Airport. This competition was short lived; there is no other information about the airline other than one timetable.

Jet flights began in 1968 and, for the first time, Portland got a non-stop beyond Boston when Northeast DC-9s flew to LaGuardia Airport in New York City. Northeast would be alone at the airport until 1970, when Aroostook Airways began flights between Presque Isle and Portland, with stops in Augusta and Bangor. This airline too faded into obscurity, lasting until 1972.

That year, regional Air New England began service in Portland, competing with Northeast Airlines intrastate and between Portland and Boston.

In 1972, Northeast Airlines was bought by Delta Air Lines, which retained its routes to Bangor, Boston, and New York. By 1979, Delta had added Burlington, Vermont.

=== 1980s – 1990s ===
In 1981, Air New England, after serving Portland for eleven years, ceased operations and pulled out of the Jetport. This departure was followed a year later by the arrival of Air Vermont, a regional carrier that flew between Portland and Burlington until expiring about 1983 or 1984.

In 1980, the passenger terminal expanded to the east with the addition of two baggage carousels. The building also expanded to the west by adding three second-level jetways and a holding room.

In 1982, PWM got its first non-stop flight beyond New York when Delta tried flights on Boeing 727 aircraft to Cincinnati for a year or so.

The Portland City Council renamed the Jetport for longtime senator Edmund Muskie in February 1982, but reversed its decision three weeks later after a public outcry and a request from Muskie to restore the original name.

People Express Airlines arrived in 1983, the first jet competitor to Northeast/Delta at PWM. The airline, the first low-cost carrier at the Jetport, was known for rock-bottom prices. The airline flew between Portland and Newark, still operated today by United Airlines, who merged with Continental Airlines, which had bought People Express in 1987.

In June 1983 United Airlines arrived in Portland, planning to be the only airline to serve 50 states. It originally flew the Burlington route that had been left behind by Air Vermont and later flew non-stop to Chicago.

That same year, regional Ransome Airlines, doing business as Delta Connection, began a route between Portland and Boston. This ended in 1986 when Ransome was bought by Pan Am and renamed Pan Am Express.

1986 also brought USAir (renamed US Airways, merged with American Airlines), which began flights to Philadelphia and Pittsburgh. Low-cost carrier Presidential Airways also began service from the Jetport in 1986, flying a route from Portland to Washington's Dulles International Airport. This would be short-lived, however, as Presidential Airways ceased operations by the end of the decade.

1987 saw the arrival of Continental Airlines when the airline bought People Express and took over their routes. It saw the beginning of Business Express, a commuter airline offering service from Portland to Boston, New York–La Guardia, and Presque Isle, originally independently, and then doing business as Delta Connection.

In 1995 a terminal-building improvement project was undertaken to add two second-level boarding gates, as well as additional space for ticketing, operations, departure lounge, concessions, and an international customs facility.

=== 2000s ===
==== September 11 ====
On the morning of September 11, 2001, Mohamed Atta and Abdulaziz al-Omari traveled on Colgan Air Flight 5930 from Portland Jetport to Boston's Logan International Airport. At Logan, the duo, along with 3 other hijackers boarded American Airlines Flight 11, leaving Boston for Los Angeles. Approximately 15 minutes after the plane departed Logan, the hijackers took control of the plane and flew it into the North Tower of the World Trade Center.

In the wake of the attacks, many U.S. airlines cut flights. This furthered the airlines' shift from mainline jets to smaller regional jets or turboprops at PWM. In late 2002 American Eagle stopped flying to the Jetport.

==== 2004 onward ====
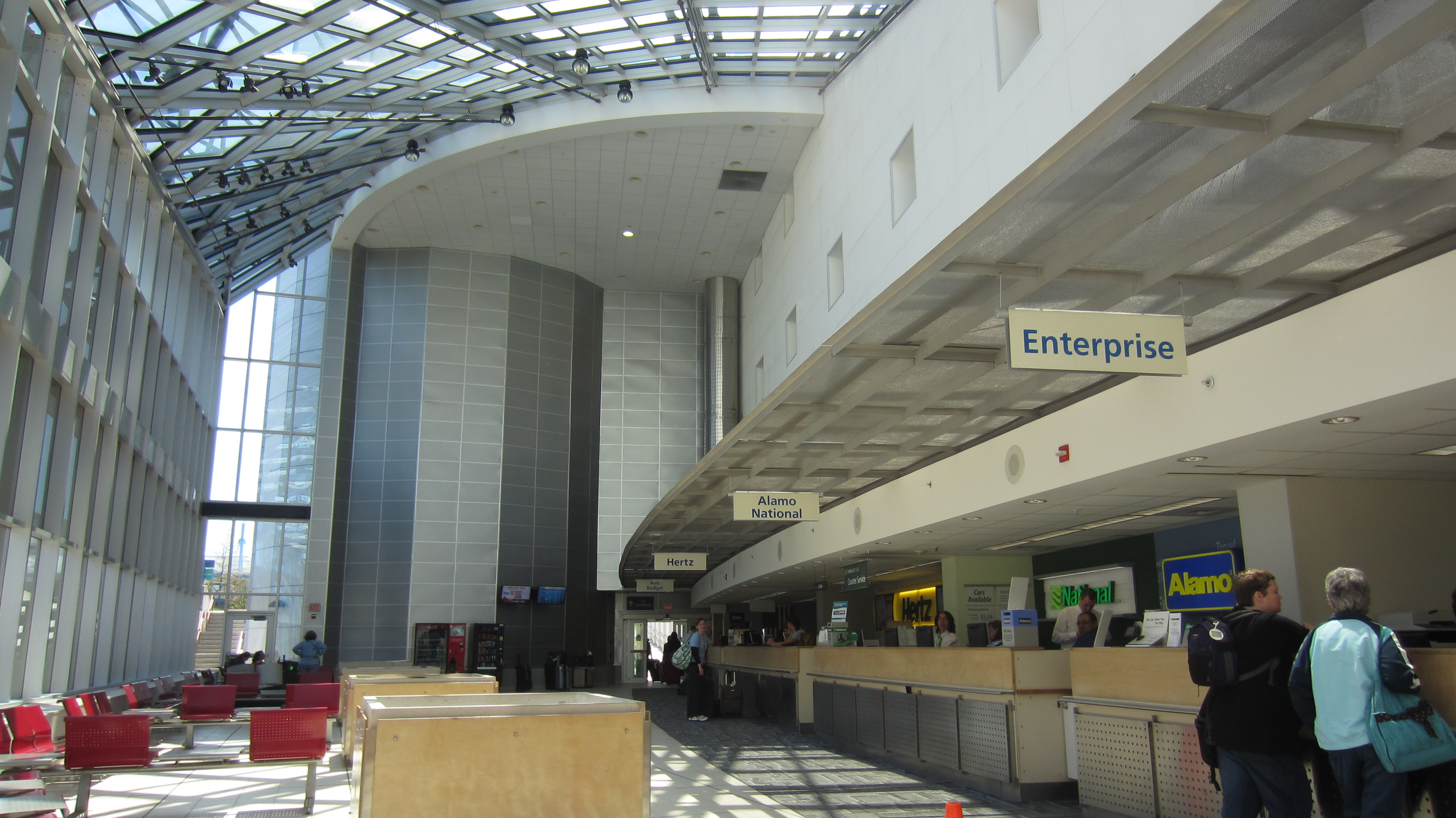
Interior of car rental

In 2004, Runway 11/29 was lengthened to 7,200 feet (2,195 m).

On September 1, 2005, Delta Air Lines ended mainline service to PWM. Despite the airline's strong history at Portland, serving the Jetport with aircraft as large as the Boeing 727 and 757, Delta briefly downgraded flights subcontracting to smaller aircraft operated by Delta Connection on Bombardier CRJ series. In the late 2000s and continuing today, Delta reinstated mainline service at Portland.

Some service began to return as the industry's economics improved between 2005 and 2006. The first step up came with the introduction of the low-cost carrier Independence Air in 2005. On May 1, 2005, Independence added a daily flight to Washington Dulles on an Airbus A319, making them the first carrier to fly an Airbus out of Portland. Portland was one of the few markets that Independence Air consistently served with its A319s, and at the time of its bankruptcy, Portland was rumored to be one of its few profitable destinations. FedEx Express also began using an Airbus A310 widebody jet on its cargo flights to Memphis later that year. Although the Boeing 757 is primarily used for these flights today, they will occasionally substitute out an A310 in its place.

After Independence Air went bankrupt, Portland had no low-cost carrier, causing fares to go up and passenger numbers to decline. Capitalizing on the underserved market, JetBlue began air service to Portland on May 23, 2006, with four daily flights to New York–JFK aboard Airbus A320 and Embraer 190 jets. As a result, JetBlue became the second-largest air carrier at the Jetport (in terms of available seats) nearly overnight. This addition of service inspired what is known as The Southwest Effect, where the addition of a large number of low-cost seats in a market forces down the price of competing tickets.

On June 7, 2007, AirTran Airways began seasonal service to Baltimore, and to Orlando. AirTran was the second low-cost carrier in Portland, competing with JetBlue. This was Portland's first scheduled non-stop flight to Florida. AirTran served the Jetport with Boeing 717s and 737s. At the same time as AirTran's arrival, JetBlue announced that it would be adding a fifth flight to New York City, further increasing the number of available low-cost seats. On September 26, 2007, JetBlue announced a daily direct flight to Orlando, using its Embraer 190, beginning in January 2008. The year 2007 was a record high for Portland, as the added service posted a 17% increase in passengers from the year before.

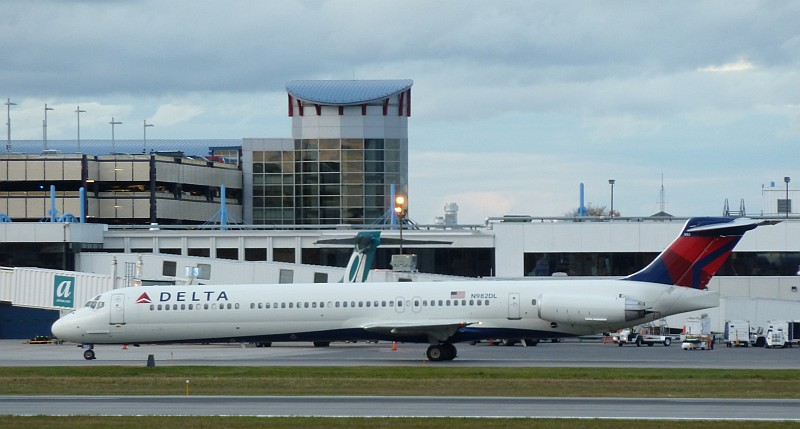
Delta McDonnell Douglas MD-88

In 2008, Delta Air Lines resumed mainline service to Portland, a daily flight to Atlanta on a McDonnell Douglas MD-88. A regional startup, New England Air Transport (NEAT) began intrastate air service, flying three times weekly to Aroostook County with a Piper Chieftain. This was the first intrastate service offered out of Portland in more than a decade. With these increases, 2008 also saw a number of losses of service, with air traffic in an overall decline as the airline industry scaled back due to the Great Recession. In 2020 Delta retired their MD-88s, now using the A319 to Atlanta.

At the onset of 2009, international service resumed. Starlink Aviation announced service between Portland and Halifax, Nova Scotia and Yarmouth, Nova Scotia to begin in February of that year. In fall 2009, PWM built an official plane spotting area on Aviation Boulevard in South Portland, allowing aircraft enthusiasts to observe flights arriving and departing. Prior to the September 11, 2001, terrorist attacks, plane spotters observed Jetport activity from Jetport Plaza Road and Jetport Access Road, but such activity was subsequently prohibited in the wake of the attacks due to security concerns. The official plane-spotting area includes a sign depicting some of the passenger aircraft typically seen at the Jetport.

=== 2010s ===
In 2010 Starlink Aviation ended its service to Yarmouth and Halifax, Nova Scotia, citing the loss of a Canadian subsidy. Soon after Starlink ended their service, a Maine-based company, Twin Cities Air Service, began flying between Portland and Yarmouth on a semi-daily basis. This began on March 15, 2010. Twin Cities ceased its scheduled service out of PWM in December 2012 but continues to offer the route on a charter basis.

Also in 2010, Air Canada announced that it would be launching a number of new routes out of Toronto, Canada including a flight to Portland. The twice-daily Portland-Toronto service began on May 17, 2010, operated by Air Georgian using Beechcraft 1900D aircraft. Air Canada pulled out of Portland on March 1, 2013, once again leaving PWM without scheduled international service.

The Jetport began construction on its expanded terminal as well as several infrastructure improvements in 2010. Major expansion of the airline terminal – which had already been expanded at least twice – took place throughout 2010 and 2011. The expanded terminal opened to the public on October 2, 2011. The $75 million project, designed by Gensler and built by Turner Construction, brought a number of changes, including improvements to the check-in areas and security, reconfiguration of the airport access road and terminal roads, and rehabilitation and expansion of the parking garage. The new terminal features a geothermal heating and cooling system – the largest of its kind in Maine – which is expected to reduce the Jetport's consumption of heating oil by up to 102,000 gallons per year. Expansion and improvements are also planned or are in-work for the general-aviation ramp, enlarging the cargo ramp and facilities, re-configuring the alignment of taxiways, improving the airport's deicing facilities, and lengthening Runway 18/36.

A survey conducted in June 2011 by travel website Cheapflights found PWM to be an affordable airport in the region compared to Manchester, Bangor, and Logan, and the third-most-affordable in New England (behind Bradley and T. F. Green).

=== 2020s ===
Starting in April 2024 the Jetport began a construction project to upgrade the taxiway lights along Taxiway A, eliminating Taxiways D and E, and construction of a new taxiway, A4. This project required systemically closing portions of the main taxiway, removing the existing pavement, lighting, and electrical equipment and replacing the old style taxiway edge lights with less expensive reflectors, adding new taxiway centerline lights embedded into the new pavement, and then finally repaving and painting the section. These closures resulting in a temporary decrease in airport capacity due to the need for aircraft to "back-taxi" around the closed portions of Taxiway A.

Along with the improvements to the lighting on Taxiway A, the project also removed two of the taxiways connecting Taxiway A to the main runway 11/29. This was done to adhere to FAA regulations that aim to prevent aircraft from being pushed back onto the runway while leaving the terminal gates. A new taxiway designated A4 was built between where the removed taxiways were located.

== Airlines and destinations ==
=== Passenger ===
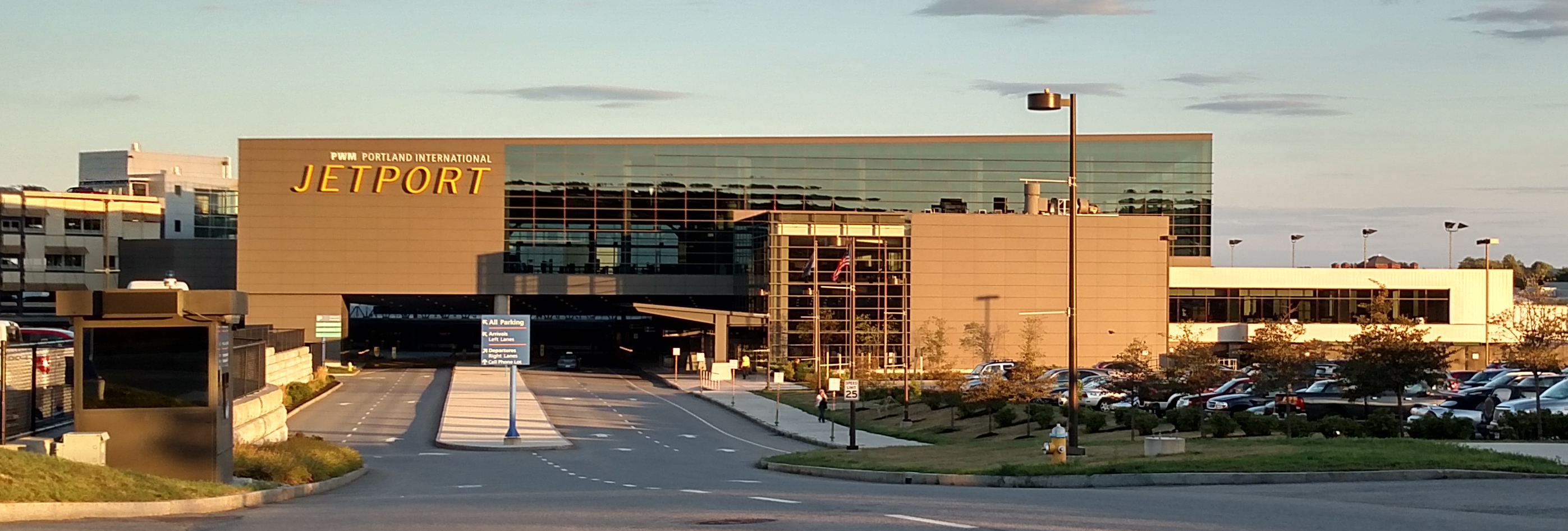
Terminal at PWM

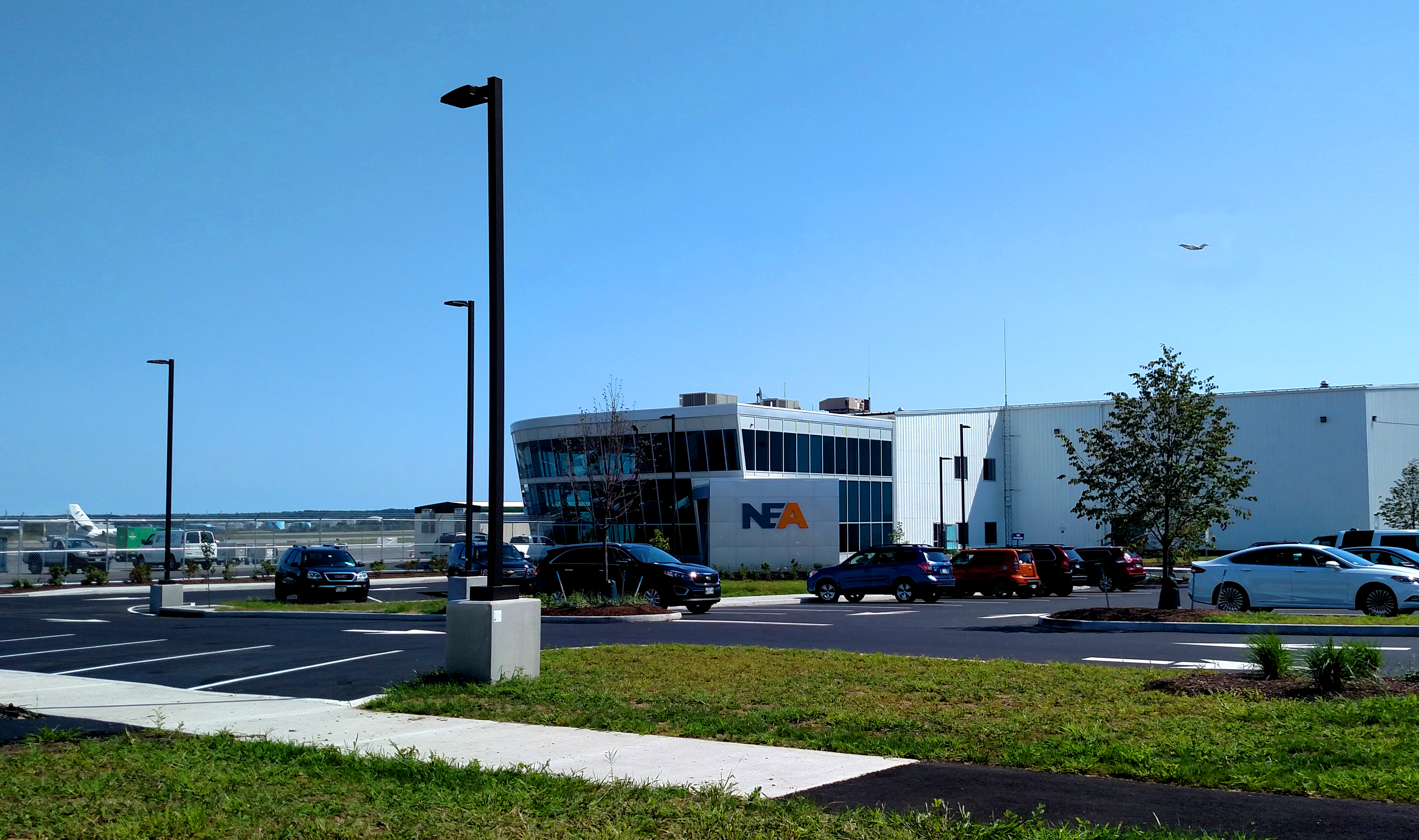
FBO terminal at PWM

| Airlines | Destinations | Refs |
|---|---|---|
| American Airlines | Charlotte, Washington–National; Seasonal: Dallas/Fort Worth, Philadelphia | |
| American Eagle | Charlotte, New York–LaGuardia, Philadelphia, Washington–National; Seasonal: Chicago–O'Hare | |
| Breeze Airways | Charleston (SC), Myrtle Beach (begins May 27, 2027), Orlando, Raleigh/Durham, Tampa; Seasonal: Akron/Canton, Cincinnati, Columbus–Glenn, Fort Myers, Norfolk, Pittsburgh, Sarasota | |
| Delta Air Lines | Atlanta; Seasonal: Detroit, Minneapolis/St. Paul | |
| Delta Connection | Detroit, New York–JFK, New York–LaGuardia | |
| JetBlue | Seasonal: New York–JFK, Orlando | |
| Southwest Airlines | Baltimore; Seasonal: Chicago–Midway, Nashville, Orlando | |
| Sun Country Airlines | Seasonal: Minneapolis/St. Paul | |
| United Airlines | Chicago–O'Hare; Seasonal: Denver, Los Angeles, San Francisco, Washington–Dulles | |
| United Express | Chicago–O'Hare, Newark, Washington–Dulles; Seasonal: Houston–Intercontinental | |

== Statistics ==
=== Top destinations ===
Busiest domestic routes from PWM (December 2024 – November 2025)
| Rank | Airport | Passengers | Carriers |
|---|---|---|---|
| 1 | Baltimore, Maryland | 168,190 | Southwest |
| 2 | Chicago–O'Hare, Illinois | 106,960 | American, United |
| 3 | (New York (state)) New York–LaGuardia, New York | 100,530 | American, Delta |
| 4 | Philadelphia, Pennsylvania | 99,230 | American |
| 5 | (Georgia (U.S. state)) Atlanta, Georgia | 96,450 | Delta |
| 6 | Washington–National, Virginia | 95,290 | American |
| 7 | Charlotte, North Carolina | 94,440 | American |
| 8 | Newark, New Jersey | 78,950 | United |
| 9 | (New York (state)) New York–JFK, New York | 74,850 | Delta, JetBlue |
| 10 | Washington–Dulles, Virginia | 72,660 | United |

=== Airline market share ===
Largest airlines at PWM (September 2024 – August 2025)
| Rank | Airline | Passengers | Share |
|---|---|---|---|
| 1 | American Airlines | 452,000 | 17.77% |
| 2 | Southwest Airlines | 421,000 | 16.56% |
| 3 | Republic Airways | 412,000 | 16.21% |
| 4 | Delta Air Lines | 269,000 | 10.57% |
| 5 | United Airlines | 215,000 | 8.46% |
| | Other | 774,000 | 30.44% |

=== Annual traffic ===
Traffic by calendar year
| | Passengers | Change from previous year | Aircraft operations | Cargo (pounds) |
|---|---|---|---|---|
| 2004 | 1,365,078 | Steady | 90,241 | 33,622,563 |
| 2005 | 1,455,925 | ▲6.65% | 80,257 | 34,039,601 |
| 2006 | 1,410,484 | ▼3.12% | 77,422 | 34,895,067 |
| 2007 | 1,650,581 | ▲17.02% | 72,985 | 40,257,808 |
| 2008 | 1,762,925 | ▲6.81% | 73,776 | 35,295,151 |
| 2009 | 1,736,941 | ▼1.47% | 62,160 | 26,279,198 |
| 2010 | 1,707,426 | ▼1.70% | 60,257 | 22,673,881 |
| 2011 | 1,674,814 | ▼1.91% | 57,143 | 22,011,670 |
| 2012 | 1,671,826 | ▼0.18% | 54,566 | 22,405,912 |
| 2013 | 1,675,978 | ▲0.25% | 51,568 | 24,520,880 |
| 2014 | 1,667,734 | ▼0.49% | 46,633 | 24,070,425 |
| 2015 | 1,728,746 | ▲3.66% | 48,898 | 25,819,083 |
| 2016 | 1,785,649 | ▲3.29% | 50,993 | 20,172,829 |
| 2017 | 1,862,213 | ▲4.29% | 51,805 | 18,037,883 |
| 2018 | 2,134,430 | ▲14.62% | 56,926 | 19,449,627 |
| 2019 | 2,180,154 | ▲2.14% | 58,232 | 17,676,526* |
| 2020 | 792,571 | ▼ -63.65% | 39,328 | 23,301,927 |
| 2021 | 1,703,542 | ▲114.94% | 53,741 | 26,307,131 |
| 2022 | 1,972,818 | ▲15.81% | 53,017 | 18,436,297 |
| 2023 | 2,218,441 | ▲12.45% | 53,986 | 23,753,470 |
| 2024 | 2,438,054 | ▲9.90% | 55,874 | N/A |
| 2025 | 2,593,067 | ▲6.36% | N/A | N/A |

*Data valid through November 2019 only.

== Airport accessibility ==
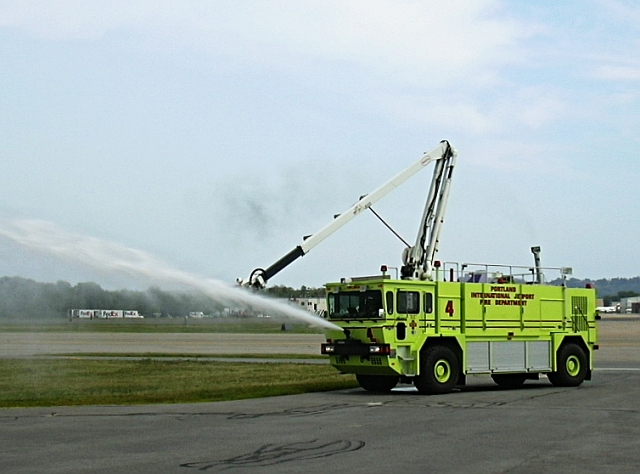
PWM Fire Department demonstration, 2005

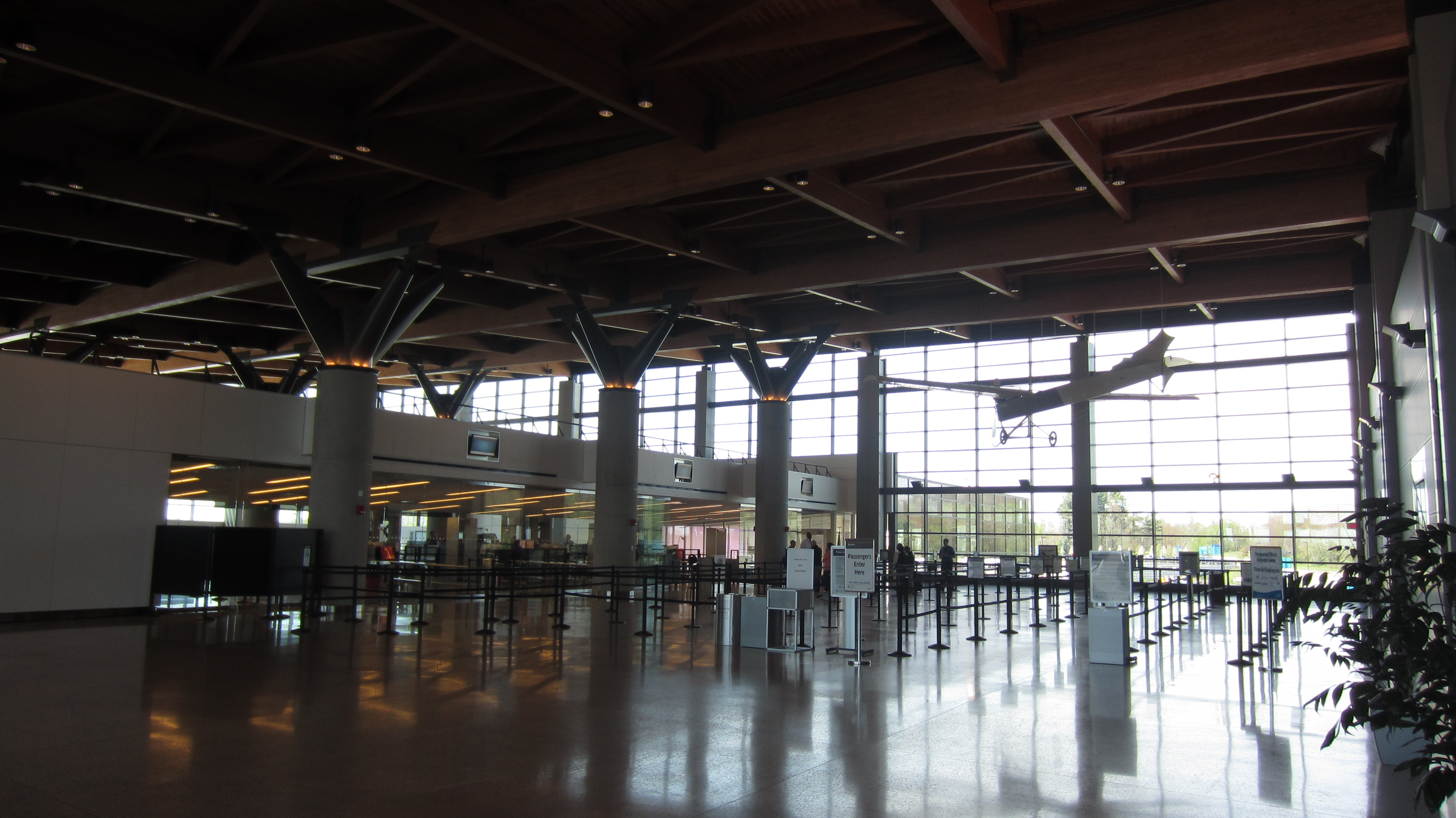
Security area at PWM

=== Parking and road access ===
The airport is accessible from Exit 46 of I-95 (the Maine Turnpike) and Exit 3 of I-295, in addition to an entrance for local traffic on outer Congress Street. The jetport provides multiple ground ground lots as well as a parking garage. Parking can be pre-paid online.

=== Public transportation ===
The Greater Portland METRO provides bus service throughout Portland, Westbrook, Falmouth and the Maine Mall area of South Portland. Bus Route #7 travels to and from the Portland Jetport into downtown Portland with connections to other METRO routes, Amtrak, South Portland Bus and ZOOM (with connections to Biddeford, Saco and Old Orchard Beach). A shuttle bus service called The Portland Explorer provides access to area hotels and to other local transportation, such as the Amtrak Downeaster train service and Concord Coach Lines intercity bus service at the Portland Transportation Center.

== Accidents and incidents ==
- On July 11, 1944, at 4:45 PM, U.S. Army Lt. Phillip "Phee" Russell was attempting to land his Douglas A-26 Invader at PWM. For reasons that were never fully determined, Russell lost control of the plane and crashed into a trailer park in South Portland's Brick Hill neighborhood. 19 people were killed and 20 people were injured – mostly women and children – making it the worst aviation accident in Maine history. The Long Creek Air Tragedy Memorial was erected in 2010 to honor the victims of the accident.
- On September 3, 1987, an Eastern Metro Express pilot fell off a Beechcraft 99 as the airplane was flying from Lewiston Municipal Airport in Lewiston, Maine to Boston Logan International Airport in Boston, Massachusetts. The plane's co-pilot was able to land at this airport, after declaring an emergency. The pilot was hanging from some cable railings and his feet were stuck on the plane's door jamb, and he missed being decapitated by only six inches once the airplane touched down on the runway. The pilot and co-pilot were the only occupants; the pilot had a hand injury but they both survived.
- On July 17, 2010, at around 3:27 PM, an Aerostar Yak-52 with registration number N52MY – a two-person, single-engine aircraft – crashed near a South Portland shopping plaza, a few hundred feet from the Jetport. The plane had just taken off from the Jetport's main runway after making several touch-and-go landings and was apparently trying to return to the Jetport due to a mechanical problem. Both occupants of the plane were killed. There were no injuries on the ground. NTSB investigators say the plane's propeller was not turning at the time of impact. The owner and pilot of the plane, Mark Haskell, was an air traffic controller at PWM. The passenger in the plane, Thomas Casagrande, was a certified flight instructor and retired military test pilot who was conducting Haskell's recertification that day. The sign at the Jetport's plane spotting area is dedicated in memory of Haskell. The NTSB determined the probable cause of the accident to be the pilot's failure to maintain adequate airspeed during an emergency return to the airport following a total loss of engine power.

== Nearby airports ==
There are four small airports within ten nautical miles of the Jetport. Clockwise from the north, they are: Eric's Field (78ME) in Falmouth, Scarborough, Super Cub Field (ME26) in Westbrook, and Webster Field (ME91) in Gorham.

The nearest airports with flight procedures are: Biddeford Municipal (B19) (13 nautical miles southwest), Brunswick Executive (KBXM) (22 nm northeast), Sanford Regional (KSFM) (23 nm southwest) and Auburn–Lewiston Municipal (KLEW) (24 nm north).
