= Frenchville, Maine =

Town in Maine, United States

Frenchville Ville de Frenchville (French)
- Town
- Town of Frenchville
- Location of Frenchville, Maine
- Coordinates: 47°15′27″N 68°23′54″W
- Country: United States
- State: Maine
- County: Aroostook
- Villages: Frenchville; Upper Frenchville

Area
  - Total: 29.17 sq mi (75.55 km^{2})
  - Land: 28.71 sq mi (74.36 km^{2})
  - Water: 0.46 sq mi (1.19 km^{2})
- Elevation: 715 ft (218 m)

Population (2020)
  - Total: 1,052
  - Density: 37/sq mi (14.1/km^{2})
- Time zone: UTC−5 (Eastern (EST))
  - Summer (DST): UTC−4 (EDT)
- ZIP Code: 04745
- Area code: 207
- FIPS code: 23-26735
- GNIS feature ID: 582483
- Website: www.frenchville.org

Frenchville is a town in Aroostook County, Maine, United States. The population was 1,052 at the 2020 census.

According to the most recent American Community Survey data, up to 43.3% of the population age 5 and older speak French at home, aided by its proximity to French-speaking Quebec and New Brunswick in Canada. Among younger generations, English and "Valley French," a combination of English and French, are preferred.

The town is home to the general aviation airport Northern Aroostook Regional Airport, Frenchville Railroad Station and Water Tank, and Corriveau Mill.

== Geography ==
According to the United States Census Bureau, the town has a total area of 29.17 square miles (75.55 km^{2}), of which 28.71 square miles (74.36 km^{2}) is land and 0.46 square miles (1.19 km^{2}) is water. The town lies on the south bank of the Saint John River, which forms the international boundary between Maine and New Brunswick, Canada.

=== Climate ===
Climate data for Frenchville Aroostook Airport, Maine, 1991–2020 normals, extremes 1996–present: 988 ft (301 m)
Month	Jan	Feb	Mar	Apr	May	Jun	Jul	Aug	Sep	Oct	Nov	Dec	Year
Record high °F (°C)	50 (10)	50 (10)	75 (24)	79 (26)	90 (32)	94 (34)	94 (34)	93 (34)	91 (33)	81 (27)	72 (22)	57 (14)	94 (34)
Mean maximum °F (°C)	41.6 (5.3)	40.2 (4.6)	48.1 (8.9)	67.3 (19.6)	82.2 (27.9)	83.7 (28.7)	87.1 (30.6)	85.2 (29.6)	80.9 (27.2)	68.7 (20.4)	58.4 (14.7)	44.0 (6.7)	88.7 (31.5)
Mean daily maximum °F (°C)	19.4 (−7.0)	22.3 (−5.4)	32.6 (0.3)	45.7 (7.6)	61.7 (16.5)	70.7 (21.5)	75.5 (24.2)	74.3 (23.5)	65.6 (18.7)	51.3 (10.7)	37.9 (3.3)	25.8 (−3.4)	48.6 (9.2)
Daily mean °F (°C)	11.3 (−11.5)	14.0 (−10.0)	24.5 (−4.2)	37.7 (3.2)	51.7 (10.9)	60.8 (16.0)	66.1 (18.9)	64.6 (18.1)	56.1 (13.4)	43.8 (6.6)	31.8 (−0.1)	19.3 (−7.1)	40.1 (4.5)
Mean daily minimum °F (°C)	3.2 (−16.0)	5.7 (−14.6)	16.4 (−8.7)	29.7 (−1.3)	41.7 (5.4)	50.9 (10.5)	56.8 (13.8)	54.8 (12.7)	46.6 (8.1)	36.3 (2.4)	25.7 (−3.5)	12.8 (−10.7)	31.7 (−0.2)
Mean minimum °F (°C)	−16.7 (−27.1)	−12.9 (−24.9)	−7.0 (−21.7)	14.5 (−9.7)	29.3 (−1.5)	38.3 (3.5)	45.4 (7.4)	43.5 (6.4)	30.7 (−0.7)	22.2 (−5.4)	8.9 (−12.8)	−7.7 (−22.1)	−18.3 (−27.9)
Record low °F (°C)	−31 (−35)	−23 (−31)	−18 (−28)	−1 (−18)	25 (−4)	31 (−1)	40 (4)	34 (1)	23 (−5)	15 (−9)	3 (−16)	−21 (−29)	−31 (−35)
Average precipitation inches (mm)	1.51 (38)	0.87 (22)	1.47 (37)	2.35 (60)	3.07 (78)	4.23 (107)	3.88 (99)	3.77 (96)	3.46 (88)	3.46 (88)	2.58 (66)	2.27 (58)	32.92 (837)
Average precipitation days (≥ 0.01 in)	9.0	8.1	10.1	12.5	14.7	14.7	15.5	14.3	12.9	14.1	12.3	11.8	150
Source 1: NOAA
Source 2: National Weather Service (mean maxima/minima 2006–2020)

== Demographics ==
Historical population
Census	Pop.	Note	%±
1870	1,851		—
1880	2,288		23.6%
1890	2,560		11.9%
1900	1,316		−48.6%
1910	1,414		7.4%
1920	1,586		12.2%
1930	1,525		−3.8%
1940	1,566		2.7%
1950	1,528		−2.4%
1960	1,421		−7.0%
1970	1,375		−3.2%
1980	1,450		5.5%
1990	1,338		−7.7%
2000	1,225		−8.4%
2010	1,087		−11.3%
2020	1,052		−3.2%
U.S. Decennial Census

=== 2010 census ===
As of the census of 2010, there were 1,087 people, 459 households, and 346 families living in the town. The population density was 37.9 inhabitants per square mile (14.6/km^{2}). There were 514 housing units at an average density of 17.9 units per square mile (6.9 units/km^{2}). The racial makeup of the town was 98.4% White, 0.2% Native American, 0.2% from other races, and 1.2% from two or more races. Hispanic or Latino of any race were 0.8% of the population.

There were 459 households, of which 25.9% had children under the age of 18 living with them, 64.1% were married couples living together, 7.4% had a female householder with no husband present, 3.9% had a male householder with no wife present, and 24.6% were non-families. Of all households 22.0% were made up of individuals, and 8.7% had someone living alone who was 65 years of age or older. The average household size was 2.37 and the average family size was 2.73.

The median age in the town was 47 years; 20% of residents were under the age of 18; 5.5% were between the ages of 18 and 24; 20.5% were from 25 to 44; 36.8% were from 45 to 64; and 17.5% were 65 years of age or older. The gender makeup of the town was 51.1% male and 48.9% female.

=== 2000 census ===
Languages (2000)	Percent
Spoke French at home	79.65%
Spoke English at home	20.35%

As of the census of 2000, there were 1,225 people, 478 households, and 356 families living in the town. The population density was 42.9 inhabitants per square mile (16.6/km^{2}). There were 512 housing units at an average density of 17.9 units per square mile (6.9 units/km^{2}). The racial makeup of the town was 99.27% White, 0.08% African American, 0.24% Native American, 0.16% Asian, 0.08% from other races, and 0.16% from two or more races. Hispanic or Latino of any race were 0.41% of the population.

There were 478 households, out of which 32.4% had children under the age of 18 living with them, 66.7% were married couples living together, 4.8% had a female householder with no husband present, and 25.5% were non-families. Of all households 23.0% were made up of individuals, and 9.0% had someone living alone who was 65 years of age or older. The average household size was 2.48 and the average family size was 2.92.

In the town, the population was spread out, with 23.8% under the age of 18, 5.1% from 18 to 24, 28.5% from 25 to 44, 26.4% from 45 to 64, and 16.2% who were 65 years of age or older. The median age was 41 years. For every 100 females, there were 95.1 males. For every 100 females age 18 and over, there were 97.3 males.

The median income for a household in the town was $33,214, and the median income for a family was $39,643. Males had a median income of $39,423 versus $20,625 for females. The per capita income for the town was $17,127. About 7.9% of families and 9.8% of the population were below the poverty line, including 11.3% of those under age 18 and 12.4% of those age 65 or over.
