= New England Air Transport =

American airline

- Founded: 2008; 18 years ago
- Commenced operations: August 2008; 17 years ago
- Focus cities: South Florida; Bahamas; Northeast US
- Fleet size: 1
- Destinations: 4
- Key people: Erik Hjortaas; Suzanne Hawkins
- Website: http://www.flyneatair.com

New England Air Transport (NEAT) is an American boutique airline. The charter airline is based out of Portsmouth International Airport.

== Company ==
The company operates a Pilatus PC-12 aircraft seasonally from bases in New England and South Florida with flights to all islands in the Bahamas. The PC-12 is configured with a six-passenger executive interior, and can travel at 300 miles per hour (480 km/h).

== Destinations ==
- The Bahamas
- Northeast United States
- South Florida

== Fleet ==
- Pilatus PC-12
- Cessna Citation
