= Presque Isle International Airport =

Airport in Maine, United States

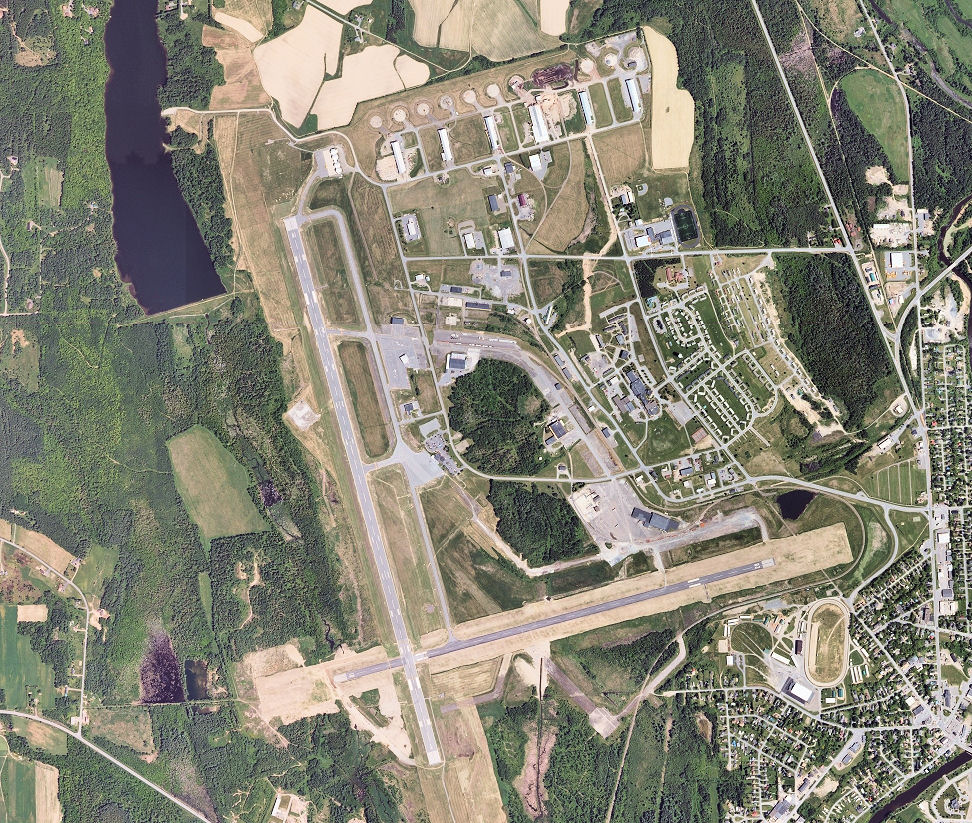
- USGS 2006 orthophoto
- IATA: PQI; ICAO: KPQI; FAA LID: PQI

Summary
- Airport type: Public
- Owner: City of Presque Isle
- Serves: Presque Isle, Maine
- Elevation AMSL: 534 ft (163 m)
- Coordinates: 46°41′20″N 068°02′41″W
- Website: www.flypresqueisle.com

Map
- Interactive map of Presque Isle International Airport

Runways
Direction	Length		Surface
Direction	ft	m	Surface
1/19	7,441	2,268	Asphalt
10/28	6,000	1,829	Asphalt

Statistics
- Aircraft operations (year ending 8/31/2022): 7,388
- Based aircraft (2022): 18
- Total passengers (12 months ending Mar. 2018): 26,000
- Sources: Airport website, FAA, and BTS

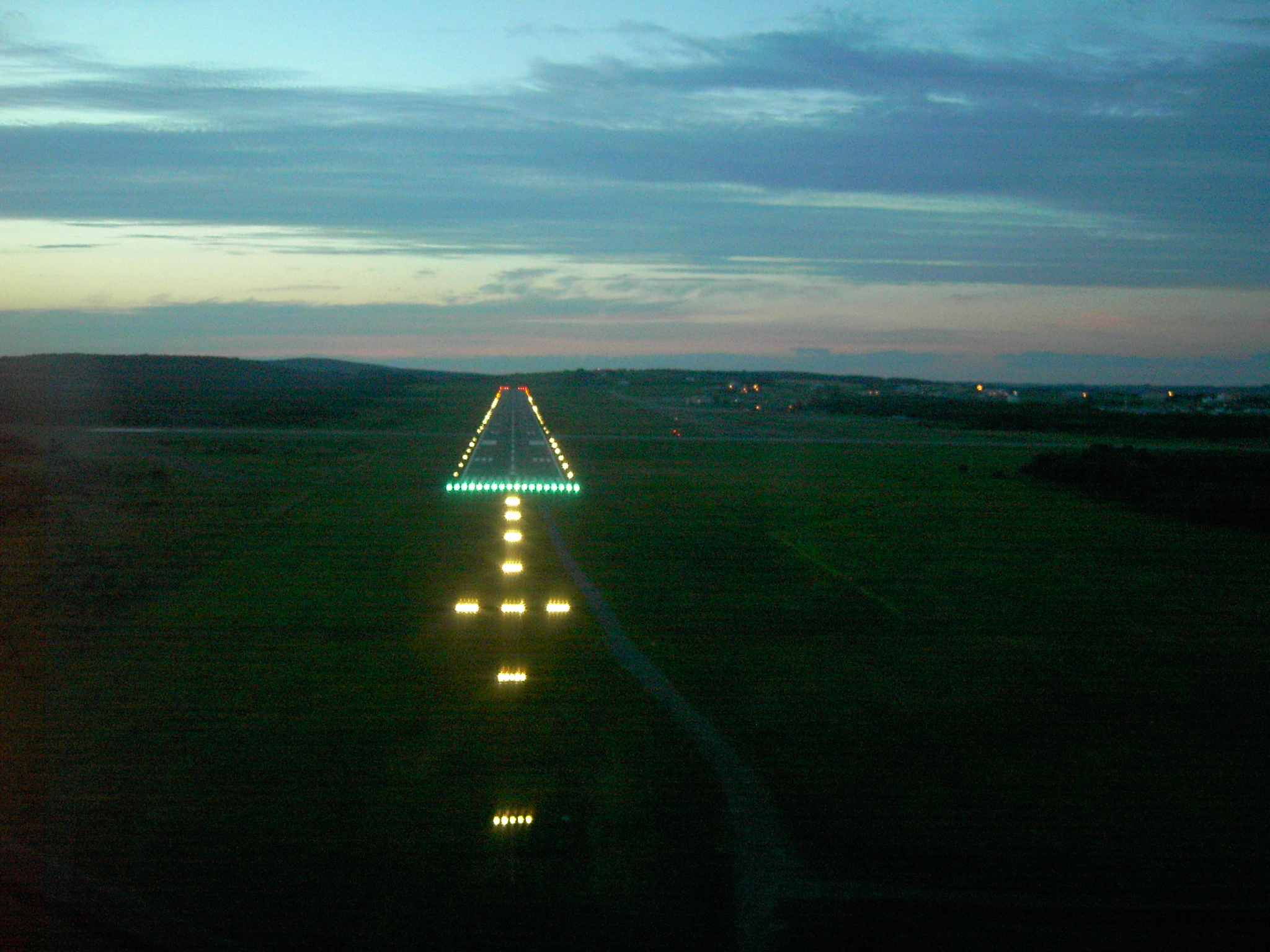
Runway 1 at night

Presque Isle International Airport (IATA: PQI, ICAO: KPQI, FAA LID: PQI), formally Northern Maine Regional Airport at Presque Isle, is a mile northwest of Presque Isle, in Aroostook County, Maine, United States. It serves the residents of Presque Isle and a vast area of northern Maine and northwestern New Brunswick. Airline flights to Boston Logan International Airport, its only scheduled destination, are subsidized by the federal government's Essential Air Service program at a cost of $8,700,000 (per year).

Federal Aviation Administration records say the airport had 13,385 passenger boardings (enplanements) in calendar year 2008, 13,513 in 2009 and 15,052 in 2010. The National Plan of Integrated Airport Systems for 2011–2015 categorized it as a primary commercial service airport (more than 10,000 enplanements per year).

The airport has the third longest active runway in Maine at 7441' (behind Bangor International Airport, 11,440' and Brunswick Executive Airport, formerly Naval Air Station Brunswick runway 1R/19L, 8000'), and fifth longest overall (after the Loring Commerce Centre, formerly Loring Air Force Base (runway closed), 12,100', and Brunswick Executive Airport 1L/19R (runway closed), 8000'). It was once hub to Aroostook Airways, a commuter airline in the 1970s, with service to several cities throughout New England.

== History ==
=== World War II ===
During World War II the federal government appropriated the airport, establishing an air base for planes bound to and from Great Britain. Lane Construction of Hampden was one of the contractors who worked on upgrading the airport for the military. Almost overnight, Presque Isle Army Airfield became a vital air transport installation and the city found itself a busy war center. During the Second World War, Clark Gable was briefly stationed at Presque Isle before being sent to England. Operations during this period were described by Ernest K. Gann, based on his personal experiences in the Air Transport Command, in his book Fate Is the Hunter.

=== Post-war ===
When the United States Air Force closed Presque Isle Air Force Base in 1961, the former Air Force Base was redeveloped. A business park, which includes Northern Maine Community College (which is closely integrated with the nearby University of Maine at Presque Isle), was developed on one side of the base, while the other portion became Northern Maine Regional Airport, now Presque Isle International Airport.

The Skyway Industrial Park sits adjacent to Presque Isle International Airport which offers commercial airline as well as general aviation services to the entire region. FedEx and United Parcel Service augment park accessibility by air to and from major markets.

Skyway Industrial Park, owned by the city of Presque Isle and administered by the Presque Isle Industrial Council, has been attractive to a variety of new businesses. As of 2024, over 60 companies have located on the park. Located adjacent to the airport and within 1.5 miles (2.4 km) of downtown, the park has become a dominant feature in the local and regional economy, and is financially self-sufficient.

The airport saw frequent service prior to the 1978 Airline Deregulation Act, which led to a collapse in service as airlines pulled out of less profitable markets. Presque Isle currently relies on Essential Air Service to serve its market of approximately 200,000 residents. In 2024, the airport became the first Essential Air Service destination for JetBlue.

== Facilities ==
The airport covers 1,489 acres (603 ha) at an elevation of 534 feet (163 m). It has two asphalt runways: 1/19 is 7,441 by 150 feet (2,268 m × 46 m) and 10/28 is 6,000 by 100 feet (1,829 m × 30 m).

In the year ending August 31, 2022, the airport had 7,388 aircraft operations, an average of 20 per day: 34% general aviation, 16% airline, 49% air taxi, and <1% military. In August 2022, there were 18 aircraft based at the airport: 16 single-engine, 1 multi-engine, and 1 jet.

Aircraft servicing Presque Isle include Cessna 208 Caravans and Beechcraft C99s operated by Wiggins Airways. Passenger service was previously offered with United Airlines through regional affiliate GoJet Airlines, which operated Bombardier CRJ550 aircraft for United Express. JetBlue serves the airport with Airbus A220-300 aircraft.

== Airline and destination ==
=== Passenger ===
Airlines	Destinations
JetBlue	Boston

== Statistics ==
=== Carrier shares ===
Carrier Shares at PQI (January 2025 – December 2025)
Rank	Carrier	Passengers	Share
1	JetBlue	42,280	100%

=== Top destinations ===
Busiest domestic routes from PQI (January 2025 – December 2025)
Rank	Airport	Passengers	Carriers
1	Boston, Massachusetts	21,380	JetBlue

== Accidents and incidents ==
- September 7, 1944: A USAAF Douglas C-54 crashed after takeoff 2.5 mi (4.0 km) south on a local training flight out of then Presque Isle AAF. The probable cause was the elevator trim tabs may have been improperly rigged. All three occupants were killed.
- March 1, 1998: Two pilots performing practice instrument landing system (ILS) approaches at night in a Piper PA-31, aircraft registration N777HM, died when the aircraft crashed into rising terrain 5.5 mi (8.9 km) from the airport. The National Transportation Safety Board (NTSB) attributed the accident to the pilot's failure to follow correct instrument approach procedures; contributing factors were fog, low ceilings, and darkness.
- April 10, 1998: A Ted Smith Aerostar 600A, registration N7527S, rolled into a near-vertical dive immediately after takeoff; the pilot, who was the sole aircraft occupant, was killed in the crash and ensuing fire. The NTSB was unable to determine why the pilot apparently lost control of the aircraft.
- November 22, 2017: The left-hand engine of a Cessna 421, registration N421RX, caught fire soon after takeoff from Presque Isle; the pilot attempted to return to the airport but was unable to maintain altitude and performed a forced landing in an adjacent field. Two persons aboard the aircraft suffered minor injuries and two others were uninjured; the aircraft was badly damaged. The NTSB attributed the accident to a fuel leak onto the hot turbocharger.
- March 4, 2019: CommutAir Flight 4933, operating for United Express, arrived from Newark Liberty International Airport and missed runway 1 on landing, injuring five people and severely damaging the aircraft. The NTSB attributed the accident to confirmation bias which prompted the pilots to continue descending even though they could not see the runway in heavy snow. Contributing factors were poor decision-making by the captain; fatigue of the first officer, who was flying the aircraft; and misalignment of the ILS localizer caused by deep snow, a condition that multiple pilots had noticed previously but which had not been properly reported. Contrary to initial statements by CommutAir and the Federal Aviation Administration, the aircraft did not slide off the runway, but instead missed the runway entirely.

== See also ==
- List of airports in Maine

== Other sources ==
- Essential Air Service documents (Docket DOT-OST-2000-8012) from the U.S. Department of Transportation:
  - Order 2004-10-16 (October 25, 2004): re-selecting Colgan Air, Inc., to provide subsidized Essential Air Service (EAS) at Presque Isle/Houlton, Augusta/Waterville, Bar Harbor and Rockland, Maine, for a two-year period at a combined annual subsidy rate of $4,312,849.
  - Order 2006-8-24 (August 25, 2006): re-selecting Colgan Air, Inc., operating as US Airways Express, to provide subsidized essential air service (EAS) at Presque Isle/Houlton, Augusta/Waterville, Bar Harbor, and Rockland, Maine, at a total annual subsidy rate of $4,774,068 ($3,572,592 for Augusta/Waterville, Bar Harbor, and Rockland; $1,201,476 for Presque Isle/Houlton), for the two-year period of November 1, 2006, through October 31, 2008.
  - Order 2008-5-23 (May 19, 2008): re-selecting Colgan Air, Inc., operating as US Airways Express, to provide subsidized essential air service (EAS) at Presque Isle/Houlton, Maine, at an annual subsidy rate of $2,643,588, for the two-year period of May 15, 2008, through May 31, 2010.
  - Order 2010-6-5 (June 2, 2010): selecting Colgan Air Inc., operating as US Airways Express, to provide essential air service (EAS) at Presque Isle, Maine, for an annual subsidy of $2,812,853 for the two-year period from June 1, 2010, to May 31, 2012.
  - Order 2012-3-2 (March 2, 2012): selecting PenAir to provide EAS at Presque Isle and Plattsburgh using 34-passenger Saab 340 aircraft. At Presque Isle, PenAir will provide 19 weekly round trips for an annual subsidy rate of $4,341,967 for the first 6 months after full EAS commences and an annual subsidy rate of $3,892,174 for the 18 months thereafter.
