= Augusta State Airport =

- IATA: AUG; ICAO: KAUG; FAA LID: AUG

Summary
- Airport type: Public
- Owner: State of Maine
- Serves: Augusta, Maine
- Elevation AMSL: 352 ft (107 m)
- Coordinates: 44°19′14″N 069°47′50″W

Maps
- FAA airport diagram
- Interactive map of Augusta State Airport

Runways
Direction	Length		Surface
Direction	ft	m	Surface
17/35	5,001	1,524	Asphalt
8/26	2,703	824	Asphalt

Statistics
- Aircraft operations (2016): 24,500
- Based aircraft (2018): 37
- Sources: FAA and airport website

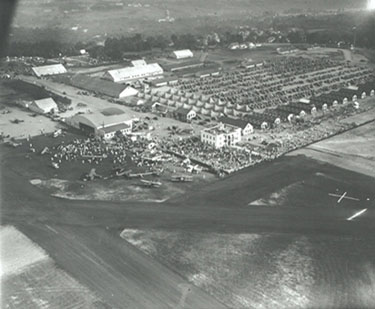
Augusta Airport during or before the Second World War. US Military image.

Augusta State Airport (IATA: AUG, ICAO: KAUG, FAA LID: AUG) is a public use airport located one nautical mile (2 km) west of the central business district of the state capital of Augusta, a city in Kennebec County, Maine, United States. The airport is owned by the state of Maine, but managed and operated by the city of Augusta. It is served by one commercial airline, with scheduled passenger service subsidized by the Essential Air Service program.

As per the Federal Aviation Administration, this airport had 3,554 passenger boardings (enplanements) in calendar year 2008, 3,663 in 2009, and 4,300 in 2010. It is included in the Federal Aviation Administration (FAA) National Plan of Integrated Airport Systems for 2017–2021, in which it is categorized as a non-primary commercial service facility.

== Facilities and aircraft ==
Augusta State Airport covers an area of 406 acres (164 ha) at an elevation of 352 feet (107 m) above mean sea level. It has two asphalt-paved runways: 17/35 is 5,001 by 150 feet (1,524 x 46 m) and 8/26 is 2,703 by 75 feet (824 x 23 m).

For the 12-month period ending August 11, 2016, the airport had 24,500 aircraft operations, an average of 67 per day: 69% general aviation, 22% air taxi, and 6% military. In April 2018, 37 aircraft were based at this airport: 31 single-engine and 6 multi-engine.

The airport was originally developed under a New Deal project by the Maine Emergency Relief Administration, the state division of the Federal Emergency Relief Administration in a statewide survey of airports by Capt. Harry M. Jones in January 1934. The airport was built with one north-south 2,000x80’ gravel runway, one east-west 1,600x80’ gravel runway, and one northeast-southwest 2,500x80’ gravel runway.

Runway 17/35 was reconstructed in the summer of 2012. The original surface was ground up and reclaimed, and runway lights and other navigational aids were upgraded. The project cost $7.5 million and was funded by the federal government. The project required closing the runway for two months, and it was reopened at 3:41 pm on June 29.

The airport received a federal grant of $1 million to purchase new snow removal equipment. The equipment should enable the airport to remain open during snowstorms.

== Airline and destination ==
The following airline offers scheduled passenger service:

Airlines	Destinations
Cape Air	Boston

=== Statistics ===
==== Top destinations ====
Busiest domestic routes from AUG (April 2024 – March 2025)
Rank	Airport	Passengers	Carriers
1	Boston, Massachusetts	5,090	Cape Air

==== Other statistics ====
Carrier shares: (April 2024 – March 2025)
Carrier	Passengers (arriving and departing)
Cape Air	7,880(77.13%)
Nantucket Airlines	2,340(22.87%)

== See also ==
- List of airports in Maine
