= You Are One of Them =

2013 novel

- Authors: Elliott Holt
- Language: English
- Publisher: Penguin Press
- Publication date: 2013
- Pages: 304

You Are One of Them is a 2013 novel by Elliott Holt. It is based on the true story of American schoolgirl Samantha Smith who wrote to Yuri Andropov, the Premier of the Soviet Union, at the height of the Cold War. Holt's first novel, You Are One of Them received predominantly positive reviews. Most critics praised Holt's use of language and description of characters, though some expressed reservations about its genre.

== Background ==
The title comes from the poem In the Waiting Room by Elizabeth Bishop.

The novel is based on a true story. During the Cold War, a 10-year old American girl called Samantha Smith corresponded with Soviet Premier Yuri Andropov, who invited her to the Soviet Union. She died at the age of 13 in a plane crash from Boston to Bangor.

== Summary ==
Set in 1982 during the Cold War era, a ten-year-old American girl called Jenny Jones writes to the Soviet Premier asking him why he would want to use the nuclear bomb. He replies, saying he only wants peace, and invites her to the Soviet Union. After the correspondence is published in Pravda, she tours the Soviet Union and dies in a plane crash. More than ten years later, in 1996, her friend Sarah Zuckerman visits the new Russia, then under President Boris Yeltsin, after she hears from Svetlana, a Russian woman suggesting her friend might not be dead, but may have defected to Russia instead.

== Critical reception ==
The novel was widely reviewed. It received mostly positive reviews. In Bookforum, Roxane Gay called it "a novel of grand and intimate scope, artfully balanced between the political and personal," adding that it was both "a compelling character study and a psychological thriller." However, she believes that the prologue was unnecessary. In the Los Angeles Review of Books, Nathan Deuel suggested it was "as convincing and absorbing a portrait of post-Soviet Russia as you'll read," adding that "at its heart, it's also about America." She also praised Holt's descriptions and details in characters, noting the book broaches the topic of mental health in face of the threat of destruction.

In The Boston Globe, Max Winter praised Holt's use of the narrator, "who comes at us with offhand force in the same way certain movie voice-overs color an entire narrative with simple inflections of tone." He added that there was "nothing performative" about it. Writing for NPR, Lidia Jean Kott described the novel as "beautifully subtle." Natalie Bakopoulos of the San Francisco Gate argued that it "beautifully compress[ed] and expand[ed] time, place and the boundaries of the self." Novelist Maggie Shipstead, writing in The New York Times, said that Holt's descriptions were "fascinating, slyly funny and full of melancholy details." She concluded that it was, "a hugely absorbing first novel from a writer with a fluid, vivid style and a rare knack for balancing the pleasure of entertainment with the deeper gratification of insight."

Other critics were negative. In The Los Angeles Times, Alexander Nazaryan called it, "an odd hybrid of bildungsroman and thriller," adding that it did not "quite know what it wants to be." He concluded, "Holt never pull[ed] the narrative strings tightly enough." While Jesse Baron of The New York Observer praised Holt's "creative" use of language, he said that the novel was "somehow conventional in its prose."
