= Oskarshamn Airport =

Oskarshamn Airport Oskarshamn flygplats
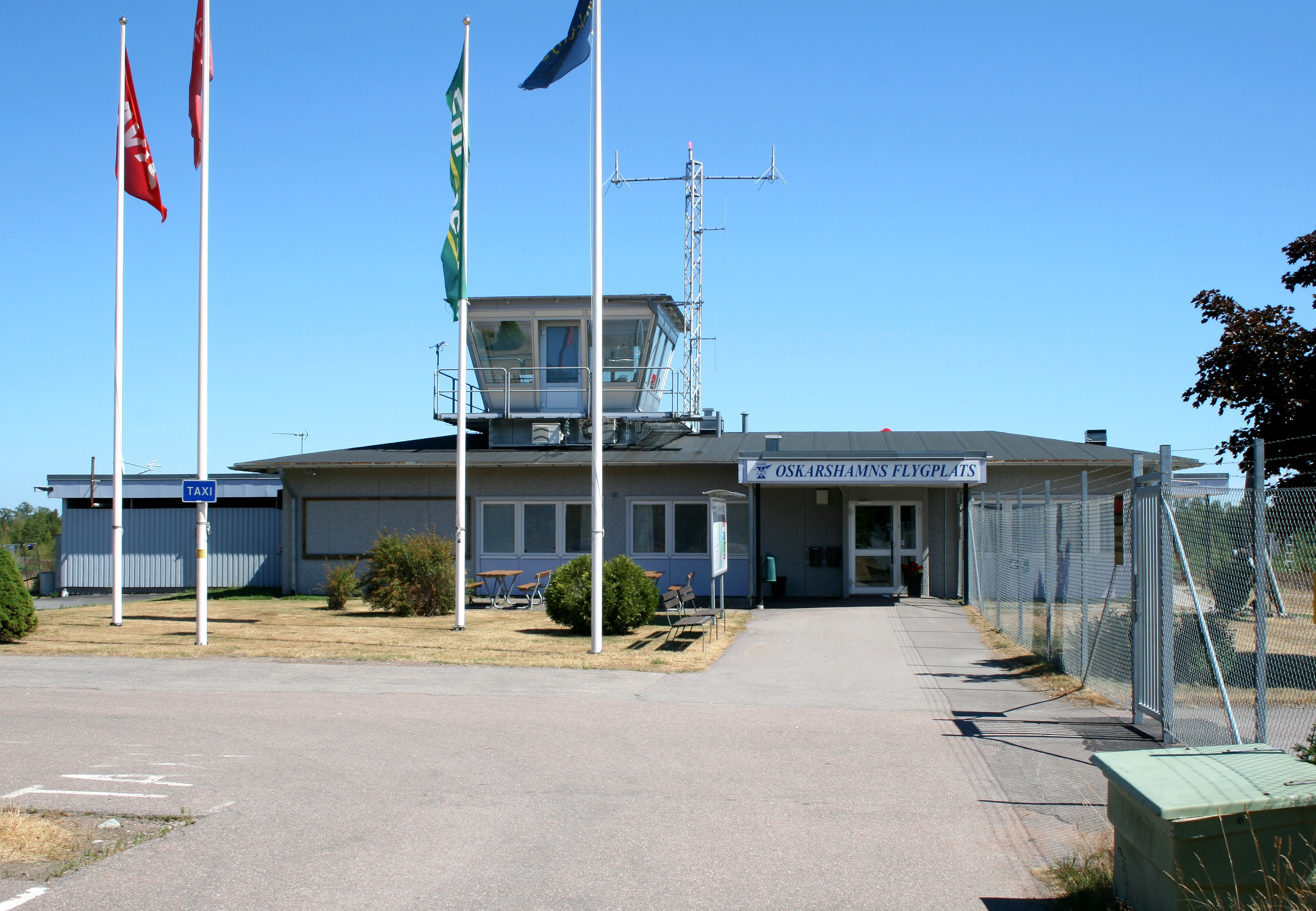
- IATA: OSK; ICAO: ESMO

Summary
- Location: Oskarshamn
- Elevation AMSL: 96 ft (29 m)
- Coordinates: 57°21′1.96″N 16°29′47.16″E

Map
- Location within Sweden

Runways
| Direction | Length | | Surface |
| Direction | ft | m | Surface |
|---|---|---|---|
| 01/19 | 4,921 | 1,500 | Asphalt |

Oskarshamn Airport (Swedish: Oskarshamns flygplats) was an airport in Oskarshamn, Sweden (IATA: OSK, ICAO: ESMO). It was built in 1970 and closed in 2014.

The connection with Stockholm-Arlanda was closed down on 17 April 2014. In May 2014 there was a decision by the municipality to close down the airport totally. The nearest other airport is Kalmar Airport, 75 kilometres (47 mi) from Oskarshamn. The airport is still used for some general aviation.

== Accidents ==
- In 1989, Holmström Flyg Flight 314, a Beechcraft 99 operated by Holmström Flyg, scheduled from Stockholm Arlanda to Oskarshamn, crashed on approach. All 16 on board died.

== See also ==
- List of the largest airports in the Nordic countries
