= Beechcraft Model 99 =

US turboprop commuter aircraft

Model 99
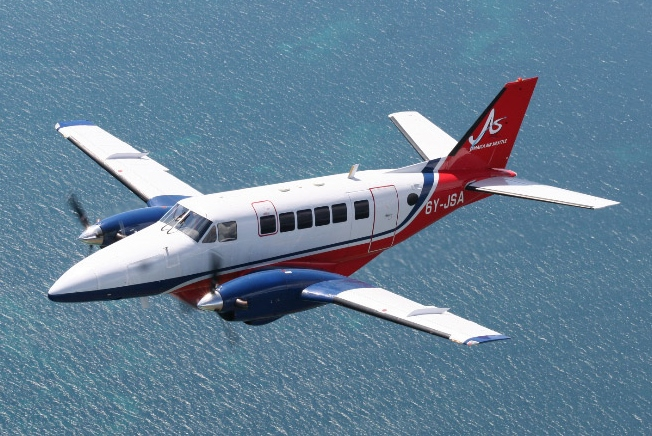
- A Jamaica Air Shuttle Model 99

General information
- Type: Twin-engined utility monoplane
- National origin: United States
- Manufacturer: Beechcraft
- Status: In service

History
- Manufactured: 1966–1987
- Introduction date: 1968
- First flight: July 1966
- Developed from: Beechcraft King Air; Beechcraft Queen Air

The Beechcraft Model 99 is a civilian aircraft produced by American manufacturer Beechcraft. It is also known as the Beech 99 Airliner and the Commuter 99. The 99 is a twin-engine, unpressurized, 15 to 17 passenger seat turboprop aircraft, derived from the earlier Beechcraft King Air and Queen Air. It uses the wings of the Queen Air, the engines and nacelles of the King Air, and sub-systems from both, with a specifically designed nose structure.

== Design and development ==
Designed in the 1960s as a replacement for the Beechcraft Model 18, it first flew in July 1966. It received type certification on May 2, 1968, and 62 aircraft were delivered by the end of the year.

In 1984, the Beechcraft 1900, a pressurized 19-passenger airplane, was introduced as the follow-on aircraft.

Production ended in early 1987 with 239 airframes completed. Nearly half the Beech 99s in airline service are now operated as freighters by Ameriflight.

== Variants ==
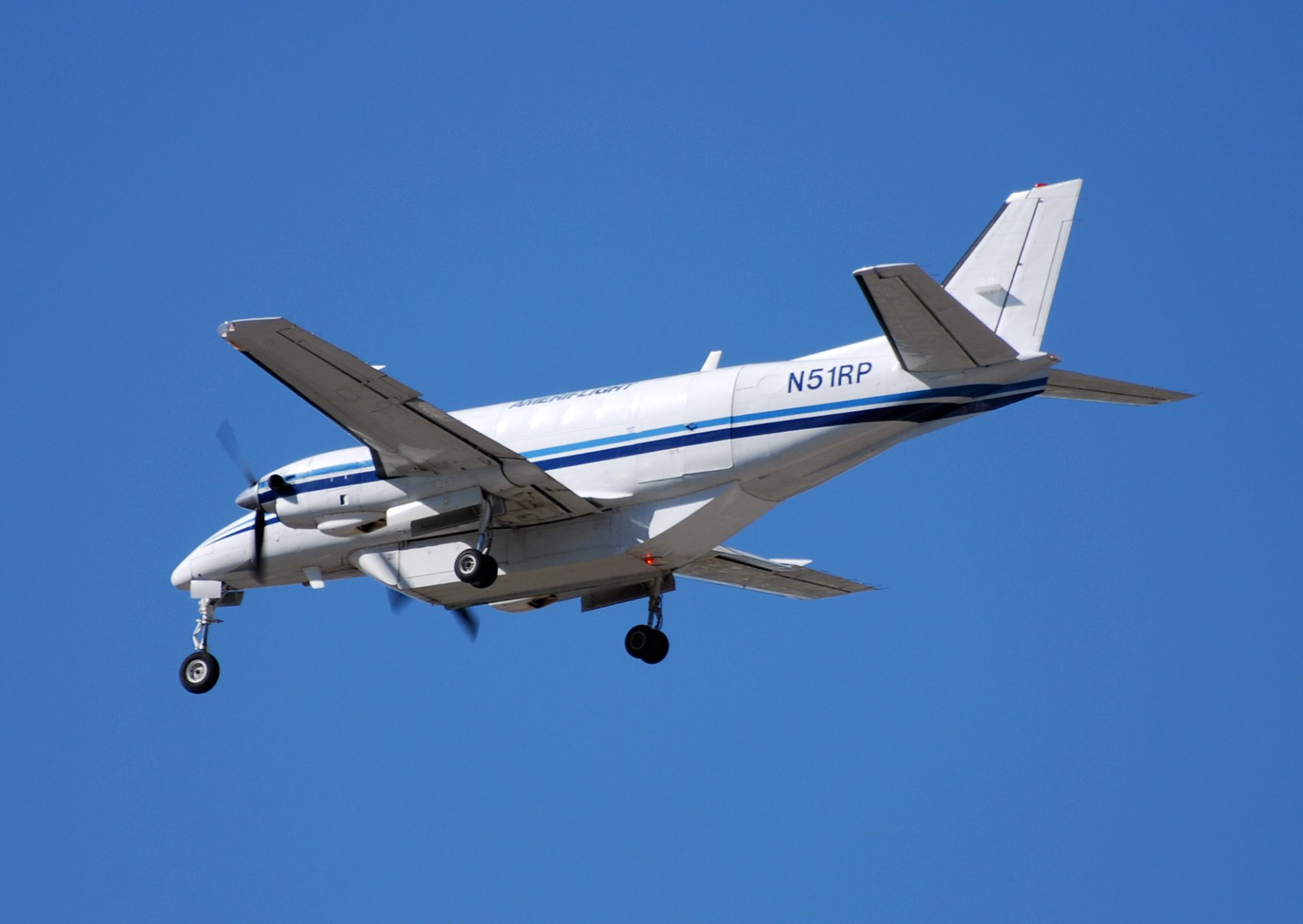
Ameriflight Beech 99 freighter on approach to Las Vegas

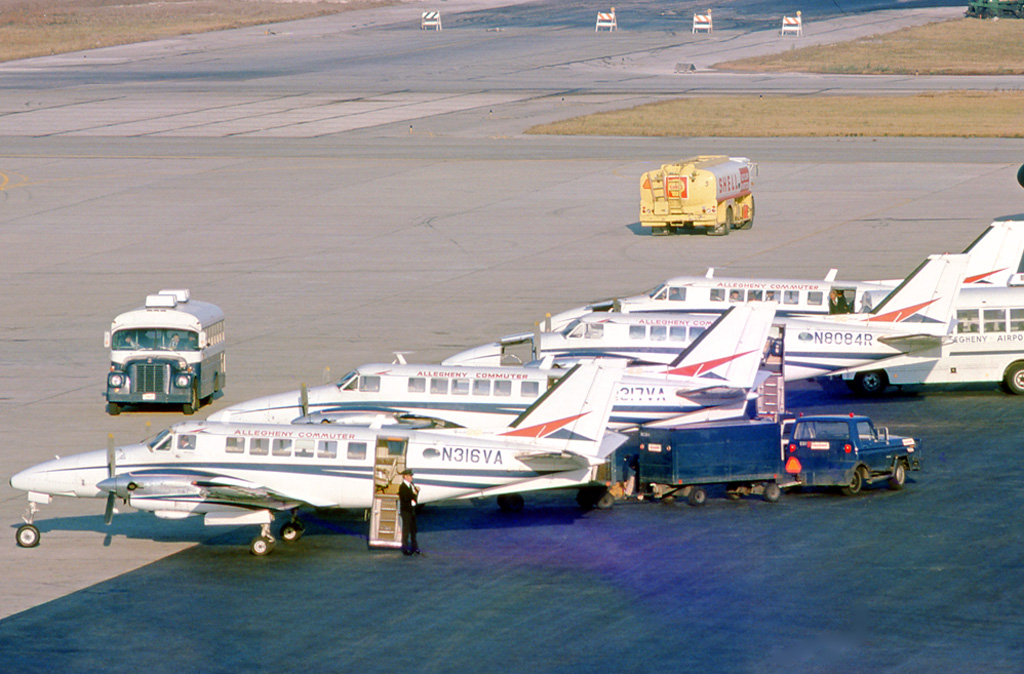
Beech 99s of Britt Airways operating under contract to Allegheny Commuter at Chicago O'Hare in 1975

- 99 Airliner: Twin-engined Commuter and cargo transport aircraft, 10,400 lb max takeoff weight, accommodation for a crew of two and up to 15 passengers. powered by two 550-hp (410-kW) Pratt & Whitney Canada PT6A-20 turboprop engines.
- 99 Executive: Executive transport version of the 99 Airliner.
- 99A Airliner: Same as the 99 Airliner, but powered by two Pratt & Whitney PT6A-27 engines flat-rated at 550 hp.
- A99A Airliner: One of a kind, 99A Airliner without wing center section tanks; this aircraft has been scrapped.
- B99 Airliner: Improved version, 10,900 lb max takeoff weight, powered by two 680-hp (507-kW) Pratt & Whitney PT6A-27/28 engines.
- B99 Executive: Executive transport version of the B99 Airliner.
- C99 Commuter: Improved version, 11,300 lb (5,100 kg) max takeoff weight, Pratt & Whitney PT6A-36 (engines flat rated at 715 hp)

== Operators ==
In July 2018, 106 Beechcraft B99 were in airline service, all in the Americas,:

- 55: Ameriflight
- 14: Alpine Air Express
- 10: Bemidji Airlines
- 10: Freight Runners Express
- 9: Wiggins Airways
- 3: Lake Clark Air Alaska
- 2: Flamingo Air, Hummingbird Air, InterCaribbean Airways
- 1: Bar XH Air, Courtesy Air, North-Wright Airways and Sky High Aviation Services
- 1 Heringer Táxi Aéreo Brazil

== Specifications (Model 99A) ==
Data from Green.

General characteristics

- Crew: 1 or 2
- Capacity: Normally 15 passengers (8-seat 'Business Executive' model available) / Up to 3,600 lb (1,633 kg) depending upon fuel requirements; some aircraft have a belly pod for additional baggage or cargo
- Length: 44 ft 6.75 in (13.6 m)
- Wingspan: 45 ft 10.5 in (14.0 m)
- Height: 14 ft 4.333 in (4.38 m)
- Wing area: 279.7 sq ft (25.98 m^{2})
- Airfoil: root: NACA 23018; tip: NACA 23012
- Empty weight: 5,533 lb (2,510 kg) (varies depending upon equipment and configuration)
- Max takeoff weight: 10,400 lb (4,717 kg)
- Powerplant: 2 × Pratt & Whitney Canada PT6A-20 (also -27 /-36) turboprop engines, 550 shp (410 kW) each
- Propellers: 3-bladed Hartzell constant speed feathering and reversible propellers

Performance

- Cruise speed: 205 kn (236 mph, 380 km/h) at 10,000 ft (3,000 m)
- Range: 910 nmi (1,050 mi, 1,690 km)
- Service ceiling: 26,200 ft (8,000 m)
- Rate of climb: 1,700 ft/min (8.6 m/s)

== Notable accidents and incidents ==
- In 1987, pilot Henry Dempsey survived an incident in which he was sucked out of the aircraft when he fell against a door in the hold which opened. He managed to hang on until the plane made an emergency landing and suffered only minor injuries.
- Bar Harbor Airlines Flight 1808 was a scheduled flight from Logan International Airport to Bangor International Airport in the United States on 25 August 1985. On final approach to Auburn/Lewiston Municipal Airport, the Bar Harbor Airlines Beechcraft Model 99 crashed short of the runway, killing all six passengers and two crew on board. Among the passengers was Samantha Smith, a thirteen-year-old American schoolgirl who had become famous as a "Goodwill ambassador" to the Soviet Union and had been cast on the television show Lime Street.
- Henson Airlines Flight 1517 crashed on September 23, 1985, when pilot errors led to a CFIT.
- Holmström Flyg Flight 314, a Beechcraft 99 crashed May 8, 1989 at Oskarshamn, Southern Sweden on final approach to Oskarshamn airport. The investigation found that the accident was probably caused by the pilot's inability to compensate for the rapid nose pitch-up that occurred when the wing flaps were deployed, engines running at high power and with the plane too aft-heavy. The plane pitched sharply up, stalled and fell to the ground. The crash and subsequent fire killed all 16 onboard including the two pilots. The passengers were made up of politicians and their aides working for the National telecom planning committee as well as two young students.
- A Beechcraft 99 operated by Wiggins Airways crashed immediately after takeoff from Manchester–Boston Regional Airport, New Hampshire, on January 26, 2024, amid stormy winter conditions.

== See also ==
Related development

- Beechcraft King Air
- Beechcraft Queen Air

Aircraft of comparable role, configuration, and era

- Beechcraft 1900
- Dornier 228
- Embraer EMB-110 Bandeirante
- Cessna 402

Related lists

- List of civil aircraft
