= Pop Vultures =

Los Angeles radio program

Pop Vultures was a short-lived radio program hosted by Los Angeles-based rock journalist Kate Sullivan and produced by Prairie Home Productions and American Public Media.

A Prairie Home Companion auteur Garrison Keillor conceived of Pop Vultures as a way to educate public radio listeners about the world of pop music. The half-hour show featured Sullivan chatting with a rotating cast of friends, musicians and critics about all genres and manifestations of pop, from glam and hip-hop to Christian rock.

Independent producer Jay Allison and This American Life host Ira Glass were among the show's champions. Glass said of Sullivan, "She is at the Sarah Vowell, David Sedaris level, in the way that she's utterly suited to radio. That's really, really hard to find." Allison said: "Kate Sullivan and the team at Pop Vultures certainly appeal to the fabled Younger Demographic, but we like them because they sound alive and knowledgeable and profoundly into what they're doing and they're funny. Those qualities seem good ones for public radio to take forward."

Pop Vultures was in development for more than two years; a pilot season of 22 episodes aired on public radio stations nationally, including KUOW-FM in Seattle, KNOW-FM in the Twin Cities, and WXPN-FM in Philadelphia. Pop Vultures was distributed through PRX, the Public Radio Exchange, winning its 2004 Zeitfunk Award for Most Licensed Series.

After the pilot season was completed, the show was cancelled due to limited station carriage. Its cancellation was viewed by many as a sign that public radio program directors were not ready for Pop Vultures' irreverent approach to public radio. Others critiqued its producers for pulling the plug too soon on a fledgling show. KUOW Program Director Jeff Hansen said the PRX episodes were presented to the public radio system as pilots, and questioned Prairie Home Productions' marketing strategy. "It makes it look like Prairie Home Productions doesn't know what they're doing. They're basing pulling the plug on assumptions."

Kate Sullivan served as music editor and columnist at LA Weekly newspaper for three years after the conclusion of Pop Vultures. Many of the show's on-air contributors went on to other careers, including Eric Nuzum, senior vice president of original content development at Audible; LVMH chief digital officer Ian Rogers; political pundit Matt Welch; author and professor Baz Dreisinger and Rookie magazine cofounder Anaheed Alani.
