= List of defunct airlines of the United States Virgin Islands =

This is a list of defunct airlines of the United States Virgin Islands.

Airline	Image	IATA	ICAO	Callsign	Commenced operations	Ceased operations	Notes
Aero Virgin Islands		QY	AVI		1977	1990	
Air St. Thomas		ZP	STT		1993	2005	
American Inter-Island					1981	1983	
Antilles Air Boats					1964	1981	Founded by Charles F. Blair Jr. in St. Croix
Four Star Air Cargo		HK	FSC	FOUR STAR	1982	2009	Moved to San Juan, Puerto Rico
Fresh Air					2004	2006	
Hummingbird Air					2013	2017	
Virgin Islands Seaplane Shuttle		3G			1981	1989	

== See also ==
- List of airlines of the United States Virgin Islands
- List of airports in the United States Virgin Islands
