= Samuel C. O. Holt =

- Born: January 18, 1936
- Died: October 11, 2023 (aged 87)
- Citizenship: U.S.A.
- Education: Princeton University, Class of 1958
- Occupations: television and radio executive
- Spouse: Jane E.M. Holt (died 2005)

Samuel C. O. Holt (January 18, 1936 – October 11, 2023) was an American radio and television executive who made significant contributions to the early development of the Public Broadcasting Service (PBS) and National Public Radio. As the first programming director at PBS, Holt helped created such programs as Masterpiece Theatre and The MacNeil-Lehrer Report (now PBS NewsHour). When NPR was formed in 1970, the leadership of the network followed many of the recommendations in Holt's report, Public Radio Study, which urged noncommercial radio stations to “think about being something other than…a classical music turntable.”

== Early years ==
Holt was born in Alabama on January 18, 1936. His family owned interests in several local radio stations. He studied European history at Princeton University, where he played wingback on the football team and received a Bachelor of Arts degree in 1958. As a Rhodes Scholar at the University of Oxford, he studied Anglo-American diplomatic history and was a classmate of musician Kris Kristofferson. He received a Bachelor of Philosophy degree in 1960 from Oxford and completed non-thesis doctoral work in military history in 1961.

After an internship with CBS TV News in New York, Holt worked as a reporter at WATV Radio in Birmingham, Alabama.

== Career ==
In 1967, Holt began teaching at Harvard and through a television-based course at WGBH-Boston. He became a protege of Hartford N. Gunn Jr. (president of WGBH) and was hired by the Corporation for Public Broadcasting to be project director of the Public Radio Study and principal author of the program's 1969 report which “outlined a course of action followed by CPB in developing a national system of public radio.”

Holt found an "utter sense of poverty" pervading noncommercial radio and made recommendations to strengthen it. "When station managers were asked about the first thing they would buy after securing new federal funds, the most frequently mentioned piece of hardware was a typewriter," wrote Michael P. McCauley in his book, NPR. "Holt made several recommendations for strengthening the system, including a reallocation of relevant radio frequencies, a strengthening or expansion of FM radio (which had not yet reached its peak of popularity), and the establishment of an advisory board of experienced noncommercial broadcasters."

When PBS was launched, Holt served as its Coordinator of Programming and helped develop such popular series as Masterpiece Theatre, Firing Line, NOVA, The Ascent of Man, and The Electric Company. He expanded news coverage, launching The MacNeil-Lehrer Report (now PBS NewsHour) and Morning Edition, modeled after his Birmingham program Morning Newsstand. At a time when the commercial television networks had no business-news reporting, Holt founded Wall Street Week. He hired Julia Child to “make cooking a public discourse” and Fred Rogers to launch his program for children.

National Public Radio launched in 1970 following many of the recommendations made by Holt in his Public Radio Study. In 1977, Holt joined NPR as Senior Vice President for Programming and directed its Programming Division until 1983. There, he created new shows including A Prairie Home Companion, NPR Playhouse, The Sunday Show, and NPR Plus. Holt received the Edward R. Murrow Award (Corporation for Public Broadcasting) in 1983.

Holt was Chairman and CEO of Content Technologies, Inc. Holt has also served as a Manager and Program Analyst at the Dwight D. Eisenhower Memorial Commission in Washington, DC. He was a director of American Heritage Publishing.

== Personal life and death ==
Holt had three daughters, including the writer Elliott Holt.

Holt died in Washington D.C. on October 11, 2023, at the age of 87.
