= Lime Street (TV series) =

1985 American TV series

- Lime Street cast photograph. Clockwise from left: Samantha Smith, Robert Wagner, Lew Ayres, and Maia Brewton
- Genre: Action/Drama
- Created by: Linda Bloodworth-Thomason
- Written by: Linda Bloodworth-Thomason; Ron Friedman; E. Jack Kaplan; Mark Redmond
- Directed by: Ray Austin; Earl Bellamy
- Starring: Robert Wagner; Lew Ayres; Maia Brewton; Samantha Smith
- Theme music composer: Lee Holdridge
- Composers: Alf Clausen; Lee Holdridge; Arthur Kempel
- Country of origin: United States
- Original language: English
- No. of seasons: 1
- No. of episodes: 8

Production
- Executive producers: Linda Bloodworth-Thomason; Harry Thomason; Robert Wagner
- Producer: E. Jack Kaplan
- Cinematography: Charles R. Young
- Editors: Michael F. Anderson; Roger Bondelli; Jack Harnish
- Running time: 45–48 min
- Production companies: R.J. Productions; Bloodworth/Thomason Mozark Productions; Columbia Pictures Television

Original release
- Network: ABC; Lifetime (episodes 6–8)
- Release: September 21, 1985 – 1987

Lime Street is an American action/drama series that aired on the ABC television network during the 1985 television season. The series was created by Linda Bloodworth-Thomason, who also served as executive producer alongside husband Harry Thomason, and series star Robert Wagner.

== Premise ==
James Culver (Robert Wagner), a widower, raises his two daughters, Elizabeth (Samantha Smith) and Margaret Ann (Maia Brewton) with his father, Henry (Lew Ayres), and investigates insurance cases with the British Edward Wingate (John Standing).

== Production ==
The cast of Lime Street included veteran Hollywood star Robert Wagner and Samantha Smith. Smith, a schoolgirl in Manchester, Maine, had written then-Soviet premier Yuri Andropov a letter asking him whether he was truly desirous of a nuclear war with the United States, as she had heard suggested by some. He wrote her a reply stating that he was not, and then invited her to visit the Soviet Union; the event, which was followed by media in both countries and elsewhere around the world, gained her fame.

Two versions exist of how Smith was cast into the show: one story states that she had caught the attention of Bloodworth-Thomason in early 1985 when the latter's brother-in-law spotted her on a talk show and suggested that she might fit the role of the elder daughter in the series, at that time known as J.G. Culver. Another suggests that Wagner, who had first seen her on The Tonight Show, called her up, asking her to audition for the role.

Three episodes and the pilot had been shot when Smith was killed on August 25, 1985, in the crash of a small plane belonging to Bar Harbor Airlines. Smith's death occurred prior to the airing of any of the programs, the premiere being on September 21. Although production continued, her role was never recast. Auditions were held instead for a new character, another daughter to Wagner's character, but the notion was entirely dropped. The plan had been for Smith's character, Elizabeth, to live on off-screen, moving to Paris to be with her divorced mother. The show was subsequently dedicated to Smith's memory.

Critical reviews on Lime Street were not enamored of the program itself. Bill Kelley of the Sun-Sentinel said, "Apart from the fact that the pilot devotes a large volume of boring time to depicting Wagner's J.G. Culver character as a doting father, there is virtually nothing to separate Lime Street from such Wagner series as It Takes a Thief, Switch or Hart to Hart....The series pins its hopes squarely on the TV audience's fondness for the Wagner they have come to know over the years, rather than on plot turns or originality." There was genuine praise for Smith's talents and acting ability in the few episodes she had completed. John Leonard of New York said "...Samantha was wonderful—gawky but sincere, life-loving, a saint with bangs...."

However, the series had trouble finding much of an audience, mainly due to competition from NBC's The Golden Girls (a top ten hit) and 227 (top 20), both also debuting that same season. The fifth episode aired on ABC on October 26, 1985, after which the show was canceled at the request of the producers, the episodes recorded after Smith's death having made them realize that going on with production had not been a wise decision. However, three then-unaired episodes were shown on the Lifetime network in 1987.

The series' fourth episode, "Diamonds Aren't Forever," guest-starred Annie Potts and Jean Smart as sisters and diamond thieves. Bloodworth-Thomason was impressed by the pair's chemistry, and combining them with Delta Burke and Dixie Carter from a previous show, Filthy Rich, was the impetus for her later, much more successful Designing Women.

== Cast ==
- Robert Wagner as James Greyson Culver
- Lew Ayres as Henry Wade Culver
- Samantha Smith as Elizabeth Culver
- Maia Brewton as Margaret Ann Culver
- Julie Fulton as Celia Wesphal
- Anne Haney as Evelyn Camp
- Patrick Macnee as Sir Geoffrey Rimbatten
- John Standing as Edward Wingate

== Episodes ==
No.	Title	Directed by	Written by	Original release date
1	"Pilot"	Ray Austin	Linda Bloodworth-Thomason	September 21, 1985
2	"The Mystery of Flight 401"	Ray Austin	Linda Bloodworth-Thomason	September 28, 1985
3	"The Wayward Train"	Ray Austin	Ron Friedman	October 5, 1985
4	"Diamonds Aren't Forever"	Ray Austin	Mark Redmond	October 12, 1985
5	"Old Pilots Never Die"	Earl Bellamy	Linda Bloodworth-Thomason	October 26, 1985
6	"Swiss Watch and Wait"	Ray Austin	E. Jack Kaplan	1987 (Lifetime)
7	"Treasure Hunt"	Earl Bellamy	Alan Rosen	1987 (Lifetime)
8	"The Three Million Dollar Spirit"	Ray Austin	Walter Dallenbach	1987 (Lifetime)
