= Trenton, Maine =

Town in Maine, United States

- Town
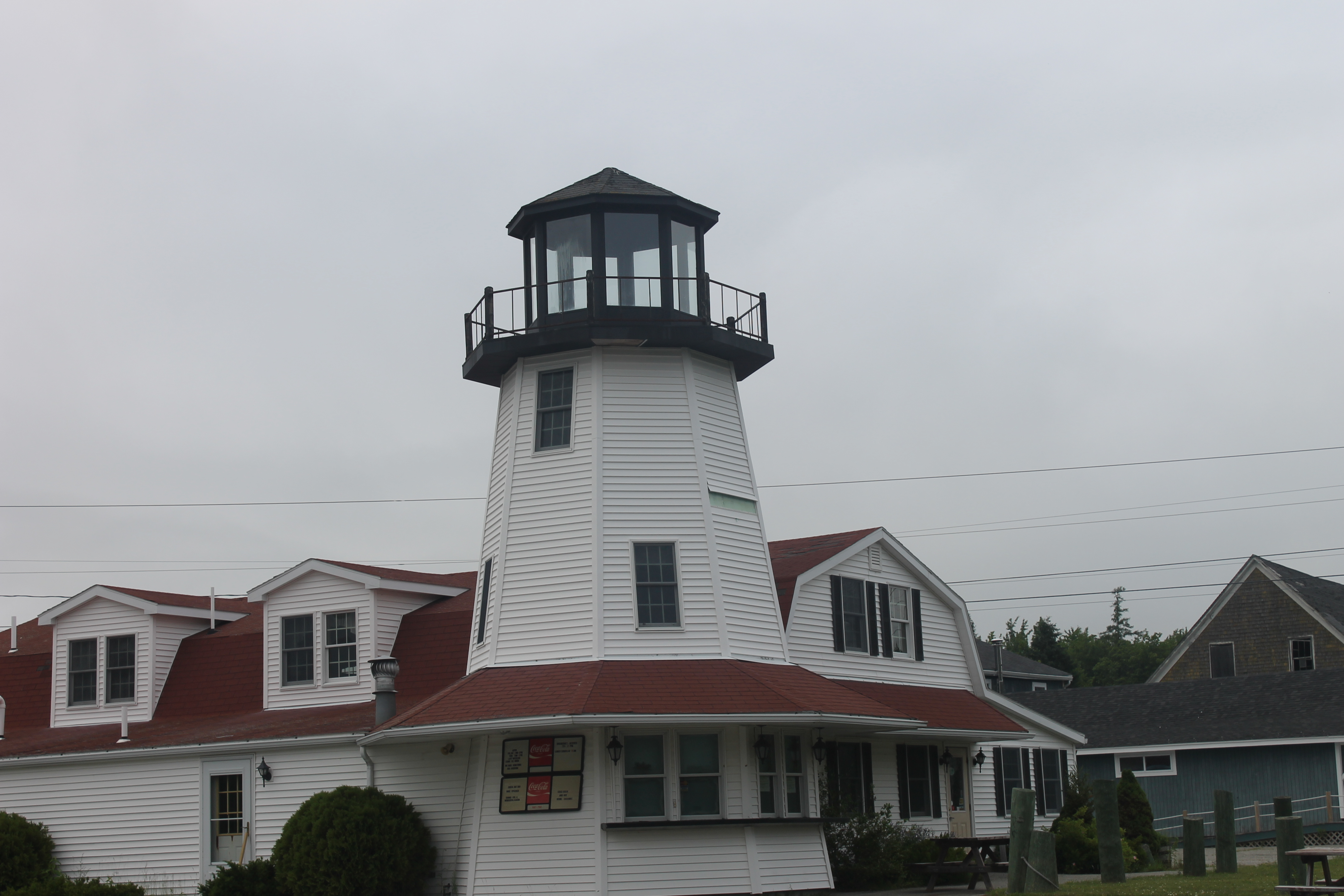
- The Trenton Lighthouse is not a lighthouse but a business building, now containing a restaurant, The Beacon.

- Seal

- Location within Maine Location within the United States
- Coordinates: 44°27′32″N 68°22′29″W
- Country: United States
- State: Maine
- County: Hancock
- Villages: Trenton; Bayside; West Trenton

Area
  - Total: 28.39 sq mi (73.53 km^{2})
  - Land: 18.17 sq mi (47.06 km^{2})
  - Water: 10.22 sq mi (26.47 km^{2})
- Elevation: 72 ft (22 m)

Population (2020)
  - Total: 1,584
  - Density: 87/sq mi (33.7/km^{2})
- Time zone: UTC-5 (Eastern (EST))
  - Summer (DST): UTC-4 (EDT)
- ZIP code: 04605
- Area code: 207
- FIPS code: 23-77415
- GNIS feature ID: 582768
- Website: www.trentonme.com

Trenton is a town in Hancock County, Maine, United States, near Acadia National Park. The population was 1,584 at the 2020 census. Hancock County-Bar Harbor Airport is located in Trenton.

In January 1969, town voters defeated 144–77 an attempt to build a nuclear power plant and aluminum refinery in Trenton.

== Geography ==
According to the United States Census Bureau, the town has a total area of 28.39 square miles (73.53 km^{2}), of which 18.17 square miles (47.06 km^{2}) is land and 10.22 square miles (26.47 km^{2}) is water.

== Demographics ==
Historical population
Census	Pop.	Note	%±
1790	312		—
1800	294		−5.8%
1810	501		70.4%
1820	639		27.5%
1830	794		24.3%
1840	1,062		33.8%
1850	1,205		13.5%
1860	1,400		16.2%
1870	678		−51.6%
1880	639		−5.8%
1890	528		−17.4%
1900	459		−13.1%
1910	354		−22.9%
1920	314		−11.3%
1930	338		7.6%
1940	403		19.2%
1950	358		−11.2%
1960	375		4.7%
1970	392		4.5%
1980	718		83.2%
1990	1,060		47.6%
2000	1,370		29.2%
2010	1,481		8.1%
2020	1,584		7.0%
U.S. Decennial Census

=== 2010 census ===
As of the census of 2010, there were 1,481 people, 663 households, and 409 families living in the town. The population density was 81.5 inhabitants per square mile (31.5/km^{2}). There were 1,021 housing units at an average density of 56.2 per square mile (21.7/km^{2}). The racial makeup of the town was 95.3% White, 0.4% African American, 1.6% Native American, 0.4% Asian, 0.2% from other races, and 2.1% from two or more races. Hispanic or Latino of any race were 1.5% of the population.

There were 663 households, of which 23.7% had children under the age of 18 living with them, 46.8% were married couples living together, 8.3% had a female householder with no husband present, 6.6% had a male householder with no wife present, and 38.3% were non-families. 27.9% of all households were made up of individuals, and 8.3% had someone living alone who was 65 years of age or older. The average household size was 2.23 and the average family size was 2.72.

The median age in the town was 45.8 years. 17.4% of residents were under the age of 18; 7.4% were between the ages of 18 and 24; 24% were from 25 to 44; 36% were from 45 to 64; and 15.1% were 65 years of age or older. The gender makeup of the town was 50.6% male and 49.4% female.

=== 2000 census ===
The Country Store in Trenton photographed by John Margolies, who catalogued architectural sights and roadside attractions across the U.S. (1995)

As of the census of 2000, there were 1,370 people, 574 households, and 388 families living in the town. The population density was 75.3 inhabitants per square mile (29.1/km^{2}). There were 816 housing units at an average density of 44.9 per square mile (17.3/km^{2}). The racial makeup of the town was 95.69% White, 0.58% African American, 1.46% Native American, 0.22% Asian, 0.07% Pacific Islander, 0.07% from other races, and 1.90% from two or more races. Hispanic or Latino of any race were 0.44% of the population.

There were 574 households, out of which 31.9% had children under the age of 18 living with them, 53.8% were married couples living together, 8.9% had a female householder with no husband present, and 32.4% were non-families. 27.0% of all households were made up of individuals, and 8.4% had someone living alone who was 65 years of age or older. The average household size was 2.39 and the average family size was 2.89.

In the town, the population was spread out, with 24.5% under the age of 18, 6.0% from 18 to 24, 27.0% from 25 to 44, 27.7% from 45 to 64, and 14.7% who were 65 years of age or older. The median age was 41 years. For every 100 females, there were 96.0 males. For every 100 females age 18 and over, there were 90.1 males.

The median income for a household in the town was $34,808, and the median income for a family was $45,859. Males had a median income of $30,847 versus $25,197 for females. The per capita income for the town was $21,140. About 6.2% of families and 10.0% of the population were below the poverty line, including 11.5% of those under age 18 and 8.5% of those age 65 or over.

== Economy ==
Bar Harbor Airlines, a regional airline, was headquartered in Trenton. In 1989 the airline headquarters moved to Houston, Texas.
