= Dan Gediman =

American radio producer

Dan Gediman is an American radio producer and performing songwriter. He is the executive director of the non-profit organization Reckoning, Inc., whose mission is to examine the legacy of slavery in America, especially in Kentucky. Among their projects are the public radio and podcast series The Reckoning: Facing the Legacy of Slavery in America and The Copperhead Conspiracy: A Forgotten Tale of Treason and Insurrection.

He was the executive producer of the public radio series This I Believe and co-editor, with Jay Allison, of the books This I Believe and This I Believe II: The Personal Philosophies of Remarkable Men and Women. He is also the co-editor, with John Gregory and Mary Jo Gediman, of the books This I Believe: On Love, This I Believe: On Fatherhood, This I Believe: On Motherhood, and This I Believe: Life Lessons, as well as Edward R. Murrow's This I Believe, This I Believe: Kentucky, and This I Believe: Philadelphia. He has also edited a new edition of Will Thomas's memoir The Seeking.

Gediman's public radio work has also been featured on programs such as This American Life, All Things Considered, Morning Edition, and Jazz Profiles. His public radio specials include Little Secrets: Child Sexual Abuse in America, and Breaking the Cycle: How Do We Stop Child Abuse with Jay Allison. Gediman co-produced the DuPont-Columbia Award-winning 50 Years After August 14, a reflection on the end of World War II, with legendary radio playwright Norman Corwin and Mary Beth Kirchner. In 2017, he produced for Audible Originals the documentary series The Home Front: Life in America During World War Two, narrated by Martin Sheen.

As a musician, Gediman has performed as a solo artist and in several bands, including Process Blue, The Visionaries, Victoria's Secret, Something Big, and Dan Gediman and the Mindreels. He has released five albums: Process Blue; 14 Songs, No Waiting; Out of the Darkness; I'm Trying; and I Began to Fall.
