= Holmström Flyg Flight 314 =

1989 plane crash in Sweden

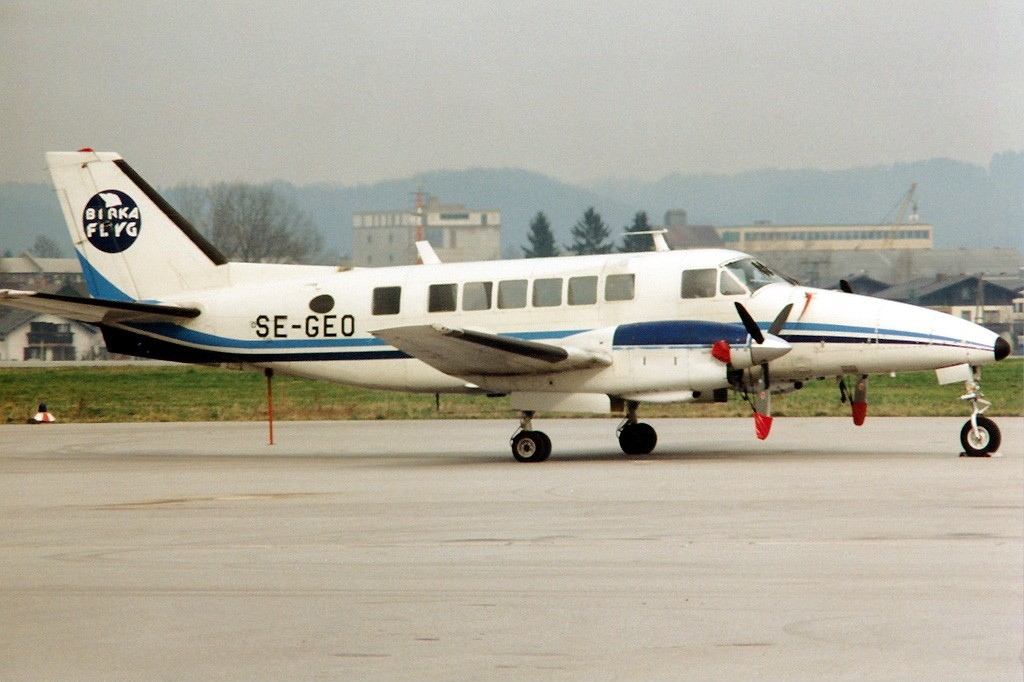
- A Beechcraft 99 similar to the one involved

Accident
- Date: 8 May 1989
- Summary: Loss of control during approach due to pilot error and loading error
- Site: near Oskarshamn Airport, Oskarshamn, Sweden

Aircraft
- Aircraft type: Beechcraft Model 99
- Operator: Holmström Flyg
- Registration: SE-IZO
- Flight origin: Stockholm Arlanda Airport, Stockholm, Sweden
- Destination: Oskarshamn Airport, Oskarshamn, Sweden
- Occupants: 16
- Passengers: 14
- Crew: 2
- Fatalities: 16
- Survivors: 0

Holmström Flyg Flight 314 was a domestic passenger flight in Sweden from Stockholm to Oskarshamn. On 8 May 1989, the Beechcraft Model 99 stalled and crash into the ground while on approach to Oskarshamn Airport, killing all 16 on board.

Among the 14 passengers were 12 members of the Post and Telecommunications Investigation, including: John-Olof Persson, Anders Andersson, Hans Rosengren, Anna Wohlin Andersson and Claes Rensfeldt. They were going to visit one of the Televerket's telecommunication station.

As of August 2026, this is the third deadliest plane crash in Sweden (behind Linjeflyg Flight 618 and Linjeflyg Flight 267V).

== Accident ==
As the plane was approaching to Runway 19 at Oskarshamn Airport, the crew deployed the flap. Suddenly, the nose pitched up, causing the plane to stall, rolled over to the left, and entered a dive. The plane crashed 150 meters short of the runway and 75 meters to the left of its course.

Police, firefighters were on the scene after minutes, but they were unable to do much.

== Investigation ==
The investigation was conducted by the Swedish Accident Investigation Authority. On February 15, 1990, the final report was published. It is determined that the cause of the accident was pilot error aggravated by loading error. When the crew deployed the flaps, the engines were running at high power, leading to a phenomenon where the aircraft's nose pitched up. The plane's center of gravity was too far to the rear section, worsening the pitch. The co-pilot was the pilot flying of that flight, but he had limited experience of the aircraft (only logging in 28 flight hours of the Beechcraft Model 99). He did not respond to the pitch up in time, which then led to the loss of control. Another contributing factor was the insufficient training of the airline itself.

== Aftermath ==
=== Compensation ===
Follow the crash, the Swedish government had made an ex gratia compensation of 500,000 SEK to the estates of the deceased passengers.

=== In popular culture ===
The crash was adapted to the book named "Kärleks pris: en berättelse om sorg", by Yvonne Gröning, whose husband, Egon Gröning, died in the crash. The book would then serve as inspiration for a 1996 film "Rusar i hans famn".

== External link ==
- Final report from the Swedish Accident Investigation Authority
- Compensation report
