= Ida Lou Anderson =

American radio broadcaster and academic

Ida Lou Anderson (November 6, 1900 – September 16, 1941) was an American radio broadcaster and academic. A pioneer in the field of radio broadcasting, she was a professor at Washington State College in the 1920s and 1930s. One of Anderson's earliest and most impressive students was Edward R. Murrow who went on to a legendary broadcasting career at CBS.

== Early life ==
Ida Lou Anderson was born in the south in Morganton, Tennessee and moved to Washington state as a small child, settling with her family in Colfax, the Whitman County seat just a few miles from Pullman. She had polio as a child, resulting in serious physical handicaps. She took drama and speech lessons from her neighbor, Mrs. Roy LaFollette, a 1915 graduate of the University of California, who had majored in drama and who had performed often in campus productions. In a memorial publication commissioned by Murrow in 1941, LaFollette recalled the enormous natural oratory talents of the crippled young girl.

== College years ==
As a college student Anderson excelled in speech and drama classes and at the campus theater. In 1926, shortly after graduation, she became the college's youngest and one of its most popular professors; she was also a broadcasting coach and radio station advisor. Anderson demanded, and received, maximum effort from her students. Edward Murrow was her prize pupil, the one she called her "masterpiece." Murrow took 19 speech courses in his four years in Pullman. She helped him polish his radio technique with private lessons, introduced him to poetry and classical literature, and encouraged his wide reading and love of music. They spent hours conversing on literature, politics, and human nature, and he escorted her to dances and dramatic performances. Murrow later wrote to his fiancée Janet Brewster about Anderson (whom he sometimes referred to as the "other woman"): "She taught me to love good books, good music, gave me the only sense of values I have."

== Advisor to Murrow ==
"This is London" became a phrase familiar to the world as Murrow broadcast on CBS during the Nazi blitzkrieg of London during the early days of World War II. Anderson had suggested this opening phrase to him. It was also at her suggestion that Murrow made that half-second pause after the first word of the phrase: "This – is London." During Murrow's broadcasts she would sit in total silence in a dark room and later would wire him suggestions on how to improve his presentation.

== Later years ==
Anderson was forced to retire from active teaching at a young age. She died of complications from polio in her early forties, but her influence continued long past her death. This I Believe, one of Murrow's later broadcasts, showed Anderson's lasting impact.

== Recognition ==
On June 8, 2023, the former President's House of the Washington State University Pullman campus was renamed the Ida Lou Anderson House. Speaking at the dedication ceremony, WSU Pullman Chancellor Elizabeth Chilton stated, "When I first started to consider the renaming of the house, I wanted to find someone from WSU’s history who faced adversity head-on, and whose experience here helped them overcome these keen challenges, embrace their identity, and find a community."
