= Hancock County–Bar Harbor Airport =

Public use airport in Trenton, Maine

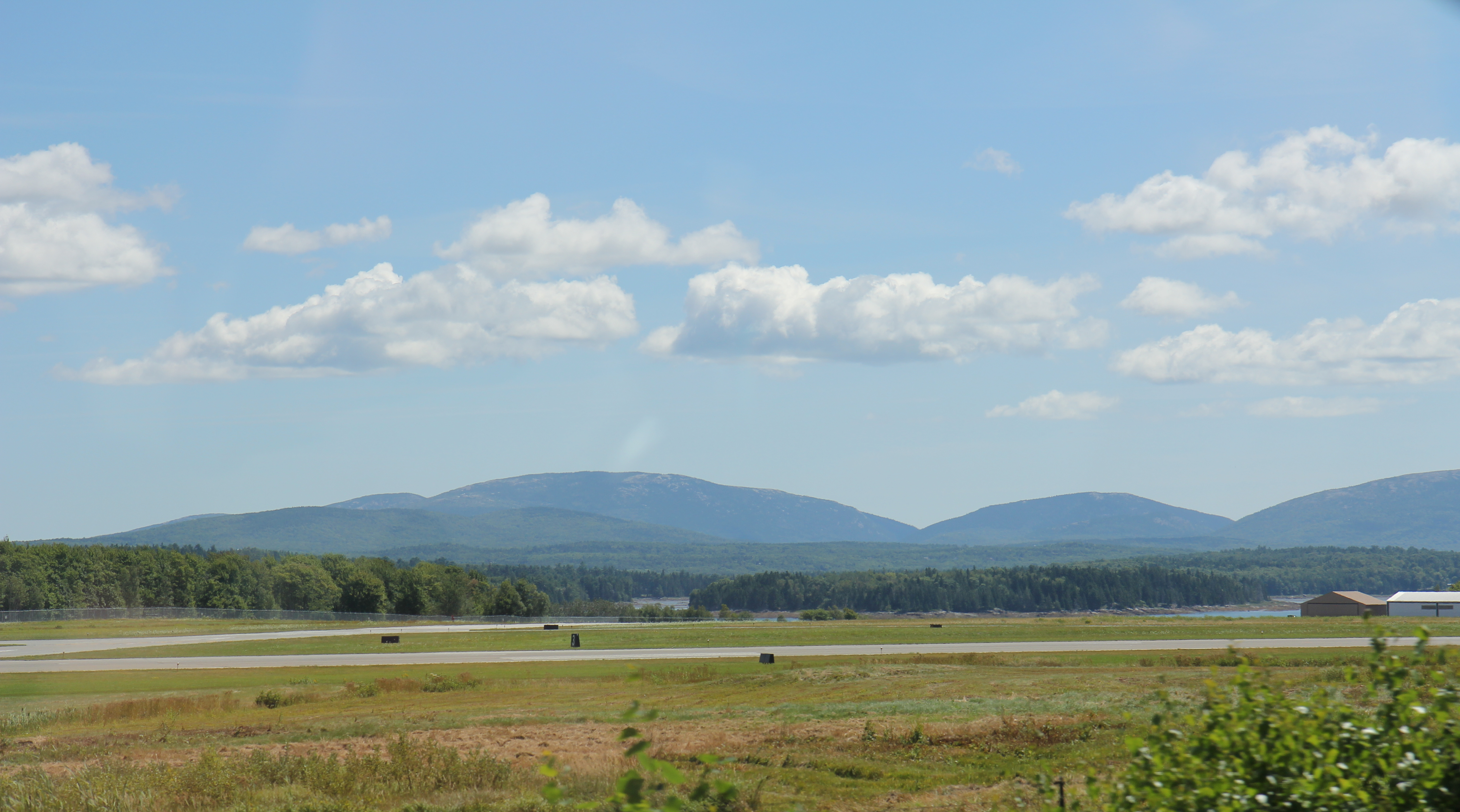
- IATA: BHB; ICAO: KBHB; FAA LID: BHB

Summary
- Airport type: Public
- Owner: Hancock County, Maine
- Serves: Hancock County
- Location: Trenton, Maine
- Elevation AMSL: 83 ft (25 m)
- Coordinates: 44°26′59″N 068°21′42″W
- Website: www.BHBairport.com

Map
- Interactive map of Hancock County–Bar Harbor Airport

Runways
Direction	Length		Surface
Direction	ft	m	Surface
4/22	5,200	1,585	Asphalt
17/35	3,253	992	Asphalt

Statistics
- Aircraft operations (2016): 21,250
- Based aircraft (2017): 33
- Total Passengers Served (12 months ending Jun 2017): 16,475
- Source: Federal Aviation Administration

Hancock County–Bar Harbor Airport (IATA: BHB, ICAO: KBHB, FAA LID: BHB) is a county-owned, public-use airport located in Trenton, Maine, eight nautical miles (9 mi, 15 km) northwest of the central business district of Bar Harbor, a city in Hancock County, Maine, United States. It serves the residents of Hancock County with commercial and charter aviation services. During the summer months, the airport becomes one of Maine's busiest, with significant private jet operations bringing visitors to the numerous summer colonies in the county, which includes Mount Desert Island. Scheduled passenger airline service is subsidized by the Essential Air Service program.

As per Federal Aviation Administration (FAA) records, the airport had 10,562 passenger boardings (enplanements) in calendar year 2008, 10,100 enplanements in 2009, and 11,109 in 2010. It is included in the Federal Aviation Administration National Plan of Integrated Airport Systems for 2017–2021, in which it is categorized as a non-primary commercial service facility.

== History ==
The airport operated as Bar Harbor Naval Auxiliary Air Facility (NAAF) supporting operations of Naval Air Station Brunswick from September 1, 1943, until November 15, 1945.

In July 2010, sitting United States president Barack Obama landed at the airport, in a smaller version of Air Force One, for a vacation with his family.

== Facilities and aircraft ==
Hancock County–Bar Harbor Airport covers an area of 468 acres (189 ha) at an elevation of 83 feet (25 m) above mean sea level. It has two asphalt paved runways: 4/22 is 5,200 by 100 feet (1,585 x 30 m) and 17/35 is 3,253 by 75 feet (992 x 23 m). The airport is uncontrolled.

For the 12-month period ending September 30, 2016, the airport had 21,250 aircraft operations, an average of 58 per day: 84% general aviation, 8% scheduled commercial, 7% air taxi, and <1% military. In September 2017, there were 33 aircraft based at this airport: 32 single-engine and 1 glider.

== Top destinations and carriers ==
Carrier shares: (August 2025 – July 2026)
Carrier	Passengers (arriving and departing)
Cape Air	17,780(100%)

=== Top destinations ===
Busiest domestic routes from BHB (August 2025 – July 2026)
Rank	Airport	Passengers	Carriers
1	Boston, Massachusetts	8,980	Cape Air

== Accidents and incidents ==
- On May 16, 1978, a Cessna 402B, registration N98720 operated by Bar Harbor Airlines, crashed on approach to the airport in low-visibility conditions, killing all four people aboard, including two pilots, the airline's founder and his son. The aircraft had departed from Bangor International Airport.
- On July 25, 2024, a Cirrus SR22, registration N990PT, crashed on approach to the airport in low-visibility conditions, killing the pilot and his passenger. The aircraft had departed from Morristown Municipal Airport in New Jersey.

== See also ==
- List of airports in Maine

== Other sources ==
- Essential Air Service documents (Docket OST-2011-0185) from the U.S. Department of Transportation:
  - Order 2011-11-26 (November 22, 2011): prohibiting Colgan Air, Inc., operating as US Airways Express, from terminating its subsidized service at Bar Harbor and Presque Isle/Houlton, Maine (Presque Isle), and Plattsburgh, New York, and requesting proposals from airlines interested in providing replacement essential air service (EAS) at any or all of the communities, with or without subsidy.
  - Order 2012-3-2 (March 2, 2012): making Essential Air Service (EAS) air carrier selections at Bar Harbor and Presque Isle, Maine, and Plattsburgh, New York. At Bar Harbor, Hyannis Air Service Inc., operating as Cape Air, and Peninsula Airways, Inc. (PenAir) will jointly provide EAS for a four-year term beginning when either carrier begins providing full EAS. PenAir will operate only the peak summer months from Memorial Day through Labor Day, and will operate two daily nonstop round trips to Boston using 34-seat Saab 340 aircraft subsidy free. Cape Air will operate on a year-round basis, providing one daily round trip (seven a week) from Memorial Day through Labor Day, and three daily round trips (21 a week) from September through May using 9-seat Cessna 402 aircraft for an annual subsidy rate of $1,631,223.
