= Elliott Holt =

American writer

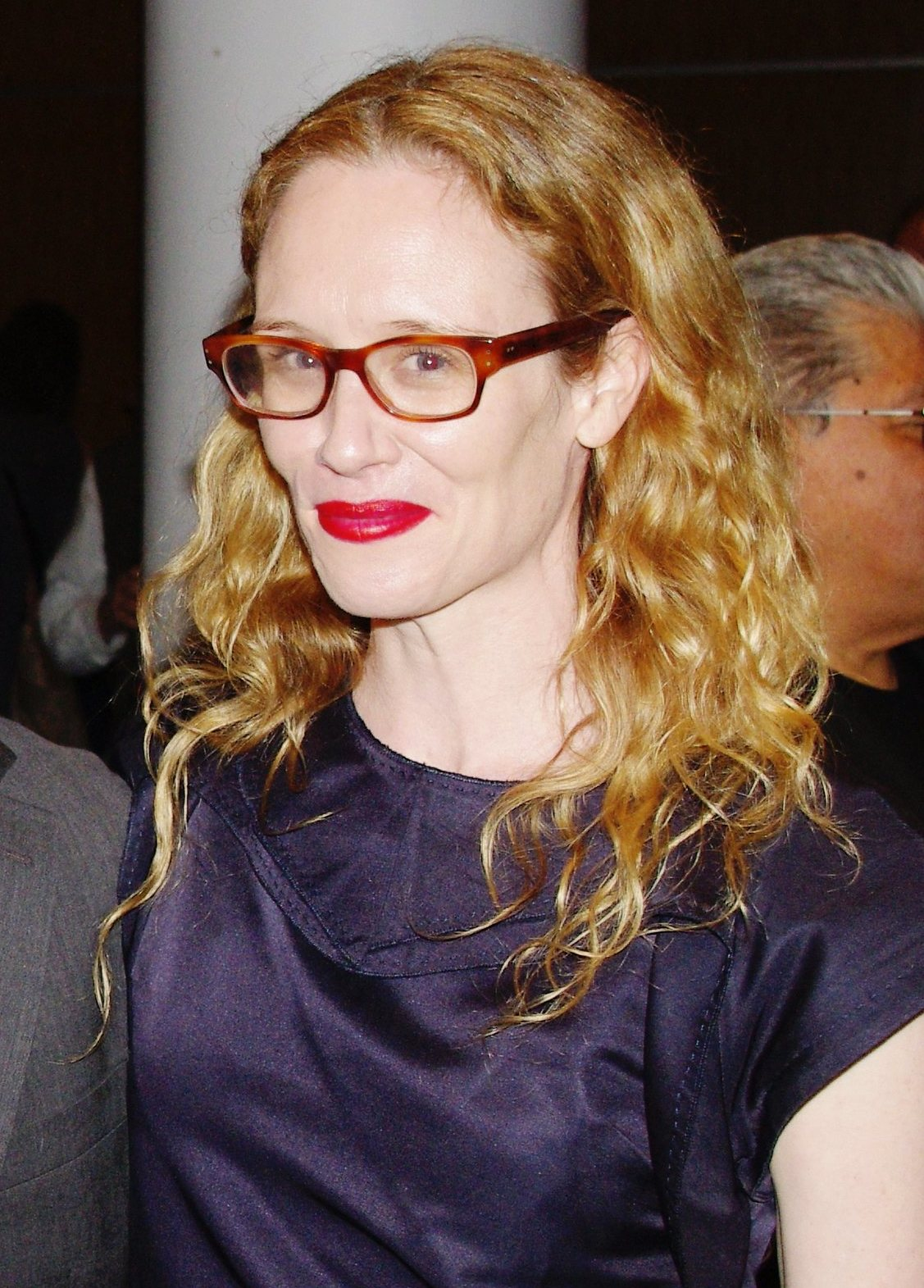
- Holt in 2012
- Education: Kenyon College; Brooklyn College
- Writing career
- Genre: novelist

Elliott Holt is an American fiction writer and former ad copywriter. In 2013, she published You Are One of Them, a novel based on the true story of Samantha Smith.

== Early life ==
Holt was born in Washington, DC and is the daughter of the public broadcasting pioneer, Samuel C. O. Holt.

Holt attended Kenyon College as an undergraduate, where she "credits her experiences at Kenyon as a drama major with honing her fiction-writing skills." She then went on to pursue her MFA at Brooklyn College, where she studied with professors such as Michael Cunningham, and received the Himan Brown award.

== Writing ==
Holt won a 2011 Pushcart Prize for her story "Fem Care" and was the runner-up of the 2011 PEN Emerging Writers Award for her story "The Norwegians." She was also part of Twitter's 2012 #twitterfiction festival.

In 2007 New York magazine named Holt one of their "Future Writing Stars in New York's Writing Programs".

In 2013, Holt published a novel, You Are One of Them, that draws on the true story of Samantha Smith, an American schoolgirl who wrote to Soviet premier Yuri Andropov at the height of the Cold War. Smith then visited the Soviet Union on a peace tour but died in a plane crash en route home. In Holt’s retelling, the schoolgirl’s childhood friend goes to post-Soviet Russia in search of her friend more than a decade later after hearing her friend may still be alive, having defected to the USSR. The book was a New York Times Book Review Editors' Choice and was widely and favorably reviewed. In the New York Times Book Review, Maggie Shipstead wrote, "…You Are One of Them” is a hugely absorbing first novel from a writer with a fluid, vivid style and a rare knack for balancing the pleasure of entertainment with the deeper gratification of insight."

Holt was a 2022 National Endowment for the Arts prose fellow.

== Bibliography ==
=== Novels ===
- You Are One of Them

=== Short stories ===
- Evacuation Instructions (2008, Bellevue Literary Review)
- The Norwegians (2010, Guernica)
- Fem Care (2009, Kenyon Review; reprinted in The Pushcart Prize XXXV in 2011)
