= Edward R. Murrow Award (Corporation for Public Broadcasting) =

The Edward R. Murrow Award for Outstanding Contributions to Public Radio was a journalism award given by the Corporation for Public Broadcasting annually, beginning in 1977.

== Recipients ==
- 1977, Burton D. Harrison
- 1978, Donald R. Quayle
- 1979, Albert L. Hulsen
- 1980, Susan Stamberg
- 1981, William H. Kling
- 1982, Ronald C. Bornstein
- 1983, Samuel C.O. Holt
- 1984, Bob Edwards
- 1985, Garrison Keillor
- 1986, William H. Siemering
- 1987, Thomas J. Thomas and Theresa R. Clifford
- 1988, Joe N. Gwathmey
- 1989, Leo C. Lee
- 1990, Cokie Roberts
- 1991, E. Wayne Bundy
- 1992, Kenneth N. Dayton
- 1993, Douglas J. Bennet
- 1994, Tom Church and David Giovannoni
- 1995, Lynn Chadwick
- 1996, Jay Allison
- 1997, William Buzenberg
- 1998, Jack W. Mitchell
- 1999, Hugo Morales
- 2000, Jane Christo
- 2001, Richard H. Madden
- 2002, Peter J. Loewenstein
- 2003, Terry Gross
- 2004, Anne Garrels
- 2005, Wayne C. Roth
- 2006, Kevin Klose
- 2007, Dave Isay
- 2008, Laura R. Walker
- 2009, Ira Glass
- 2010, Nina Totenberg
- 2011, Lourdes Garcia-Navarro
- 2012–2014, (no award)
- 2015, Ofeibea Quist-Arcton, David Gilkey
- 2016–2023, (no award)
- 2024, Raney Aronson-Rath
- 2025, (no award announced)
