= Hummingbird Air =

| IATA | ICAO | Call sign |
|---|---|---|
| ? | ? | ? |
- Founded: 31 August 2013
- Commenced operations: 2013
- Ceased operations: 2017
- Operating bases: Henry E. Rohlsen Airport
- Fleet size: 3
- Destinations: 5
- Key people: Sam Raphael, president
- Website: hum-air.com

Hummingbird Air was an airline offering scheduled and chartered air taxi services as well as cargo flights in the Caribbean. It was based at Henry E. Rohlsen Airport on the island of St. Croix, U.S. Virgin Islands. The airline was founded in late 2013 by Sam Raphael, a Dominican hotelier who wanted to improve air service to Dominica. As of April 1, 2017, Hummingbird Air ceased operations. It served five destinations in the Caribbean with a fleet of three Beechcraft Model 99 aircraft. The company slogan was Connecting the hidden Caribbean.

== History ==
The owner of Hummingbird Air, Sam Raphael, had expressed issues with air service to Dominica as early as 2010. As the owner of the Jungle Bay Resort on the island, he claimed the lack of direct flights had turned potential customers away from his resort. On 31 August 2013, Raphael announced his intent to start the airline, claiming it would be important to the Dominican tourism industry.

Hummingbird Air commenced operations in late 2013 with charter flights. It inaugurated flights to Dominica on 27 July 2014, from St. Thomas. In October 2015, the airline obtained Part 135 certification from the U.S. Department of Transportation, allowing it to operate scheduled flights.

On 17 August 2015, a Hummingbird Air aircraft crash-landed in Barbuda. Another crash-landing occurred in St. Lucia on 8 November. The airline responded by immediately suspending all passenger operations and launching an internal investigation. The Eastern Caribbean Civil Aviation Authority also started an investigation of the incident. Following a period of reorganization and retraining of its pilots, Hummingbird Air resumed operations on 3 May 2016, in time for the summer travel season.

== Destinations ==
As of May 2016, Hummingbird Air serviced the following destinations:

| Country/Territory | Island | Airport | Notes | Refs |
|---|---|---|---|---|
| Dominica | — | Douglas–Charles Airport | | |
| Saint Kitts and Nevis | Nevis | Vance W. Amory International Airport | | |
| Saint Kitts and Nevis | Saint Kitts | Robert L. Bradshaw International Airport | | |
| U.S. Virgin Islands | Saint Croix | Henry E. Rohlsen Airport | Hub | |
| U.S. Virgin Islands | Saint Thomas | Cyril E. King Airport | | |

== Fleet ==
As of May 2016, Hummingbird Air operated a fleet of three Beechcraft Model 99 aircraft.

Hummingbird Air fleet
| Aircraft | In service | Orders | Passengers | Notes |
|---|---|---|---|---|
| Beechcraft Model 99 | 3 | — | 9 | passenger capacity reduced from 15 to accommodate for cargo |

== Accidents and incidents ==
- On 17 August 2015, a Hummingbird Air Beechcraft Model 99 flying from V. C. Bird International Airport in Antigua to Barbuda Codrington Airport veered off the runway and crashed into a field upon arrival in Barbuda. None of the six passengers on board were injured in the accident.
- On 8 November 2015, another Beechcraft Model 99, registered N7994H, veered off the runway into a grassy area upon landing at George F. L. Charles Airport in St. Lucia. The aircraft's right landing gear had malfunctioned. The sole occupant of the aircraft, the pilot, was not harmed. Following the incident, Hummingbird Air suspended all operations and the Eastern Caribbean Civil Aviation Authority launched an investigation.

== See also ==
- List of airlines of U.S. Virgin Islands
