= Bar Harbor Airlines =

Commuter airline of the United States (1943–1991)

Bar Harbor Airlines, Inc.
IATA	ICAO	Call sign
QO	AJC	BAR HARBOR
- Founded: October 2, 1943
- Ceased operations: January 20, 1991 (merged to form ExpressJet)
- Hubs: Bangor; Boston; Miami; Newark; New York–LaGuardia; Tampa
- Frequent-flyer program: OnePass
- Parent company: Texas Air Corporation
- Headquarters: Hancock County–Bar Harbor Airport, Trenton, Maine (1943–1989); Houston, Texas (1989–1991)
- Founder: Thomas Caruso; Joseph Caruso

Bar Harbor Airlines was a commuter airline in the United States that operated from 1943 until it merged to form ExpressJet in 1991. It was headquartered at Hancock County–Bar Harbor Airport in Trenton, Maine, and later in Houston, Texas.

== History ==
The company was founded on October 2, 1943 by brothers Thomas and Joseph Caruso, as Bar Harbor Airways. They began flying charters and scenic flights from the Bar Harbor town dock. By 1950, they had established a base of operations at the Hancock County–Bar Harbor Airport.

Operating as Bar Harbor Airways, the company started scheduled commuter flights in 1968, initially offering only flights to Bangor International Airport with jointly-marketed direct connections provided to Northeast Airlines flights to Boston Logan Airport and beyond.

The collaboration with Northeast Airlines did not last long and direct flights from Bar Harbor to Boston were soon initiated to replace the connecting flights operated via Bangor.

The Boston route proved popular and in 1972, now operating as Bar Harbor Airlines, the airline expanded its route system to five airports including an international route from Boston to Quebec City via Portland and Bangor, Maine.

By 1974, the airline offered round-trip services between each city it served. Being a commuter airline made this easy, as each of its services consisted of short flights with quick turnaround times, and, with a large number of aircraft available, Bar Harbor had hubs in every city it served. During the 1970s, Bar Harbor Airlines primarily used Cessna 402's and 310's, later adding Beech 99 aircraft.

The airline also offered cargo service to the destinations it served. Bar Harbor's first crash, on August 16, 1976, was on a cargo flight from Bangor International Airport in Bangor, Maine, to Bar Harbor. The airplane carried only one person, the pilot, and he was not injured. Peter Monighetti, chief pilot for the airline, was ferrying a Beechcraft 99 airplane from Bangor when the plane crashed on a ridge in Lamoine, Maine. Monighetti had been making an approach upon Bar Harbor Airport, located across the Jordan River in Trenton, Maine.

In May 1978, the company announced the establishment service between Portland and Hartford, Maine. At this time, T. J. Caruso was president of the company.

The airline's second accident proved to be tragic. On May 16, 1978, a flight carrying company founder Thomas Caruso, his son Gary Caruso (Vice President of the company) and two other company pilots, Peter Monighetti and Malcolm Connell, crashed in heavy fog near Bar Harbor Airport in Trenton, Maine. There were no survivors. The cause of the crash was later ruled to be a manufacturer defect and several family members of the crash victims received cash settlements from the manufacturer of the aircraft.

On August 25, 1985, a Beechcraft Model 99 operating as Flight 1808, crashed while landing in Auburn, Maine. Two crew members and six passengers, including Samantha Smith, died in the crash.

=== 1980s ===
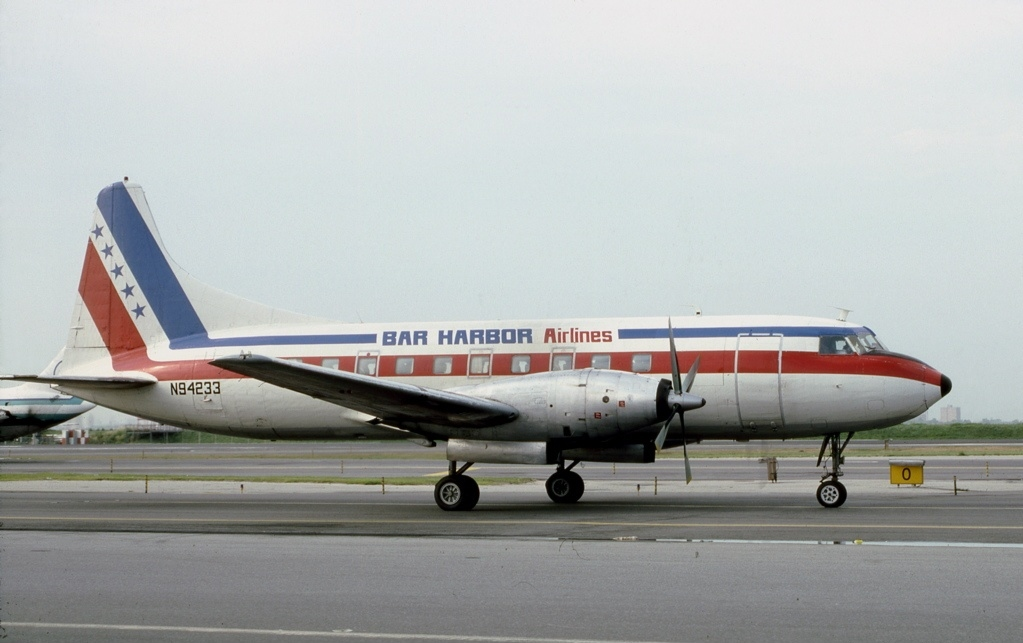
Bar Harbor Airlines Convair CV-600 at La Guardia Airport (July 1984)

Other than the crash in 1985 of a Beechcraft that carried Samantha Smith, the airline did not receive much bad publicity outside New England after the accident. This was partly because commuter air carriers are generally known only around the communities they serve. Bar Harbor Airlines decided to make Boston's Logan International Airport its only permanent base, apart from the Bar Harbor airport hub. Also during this decade, the airline bought some Convair CV-600, CASA C-212 Aviocar, Saab 340, Beechcraft 1900, and ATR 42 turboprops, putting them into service immediately. Bar Harbor began to operate flights under a code-share agreement with Eastern Air Lines, and later with Continental Airlines.

As of 1982, Bar Harbor had an agreement with Eastern to handle reservations at some airports.

In April 1987, Texas Air Corporation purchased 50% of Bar Harbor Airlines and arrange for the sale of its own Provincetown-Boston Airlines (PBA) to Bar Harbor. Texas Air had acquired PBA through its merger with People Express, and already owned Eastern Airlines and Continental Airlines. At the time, Provincetown-Boston (PBA) was operating as Continental Express, and Bar Harbor as Eastern Express. Texas Air continued to operate the consolidated PBA/Bar Harbor as a commuter carrier for both Continental and Eastern, with hub operations at Boston, New York/LaGuardia, Newark, Philadelphia, Tampa and Miami.

In October 1988, a Bar Harbor commuter flight was involved in an incident where it came much closer than usual to Air Force One, with Ronald Reagan on board, during both plane's descent to Newark, New Jersey; the incident was found to be due to a cumulation of errors at four separate FAA facilities along the east coast.

In 1989 Bar Harbor moved its headquarters to Houston, Texas from Maine after the state refused to renew a multimillion-dollar tax break.

=== 1990s ===
With additional aircraft financing, Texas International Airlines (through Eastern and Continental) acquired a majority interest in Bar Harbor. Bar Harbor stopped flying its older aircraft and the older PBA aircraft by the beginning of 1990 in favor of newer, modern aircraft. After Eastern's strike, bankruptcy filing, and ultimate separation from Texas Air, Bar Harbor too had to be divided between the two carriers. The aircraft fleet was divided between the two parents; the Saab 340s and Beechcraft 99s went to Eastern, and the ATR 42s went to Continental. The routes were divided between the two carriers. The Miami and Tampa hubs went to Eastern and continued operating as Eastern Express, while the Newark, LaGuardia, and Boston hubs went to Continental and operated as Continental Express. Employees were given the choice of going with either the Eastern Express division or the Continental Express portion of Bar Harbor. The Bar Harbor Airlines name and operating certificate ironically went to Eastern for the Florida operation. Continental then merged the New England portion of Bar Harbor and PBA with its other commuter carriers: Britt Airways (based in Terre Haute, Indiana) and Rocky Mountain Airways (based in Denver), and operated Continental Express under the Britt Airways certificate.

Bar Harbor Airlines and its parent Eastern Air Lines suffered economically from the Gulf War of 1991. Rising fuel costs from the war, as well as management and labor issues were contributing factors in Eastern's demise. Only two months after Eastern stopped flying in January 1991, Bar Harbor ceased flying as Eastern Express. Efforts by a small group of investors were made to purchase Bar Harbor's former Eastern Express assets prior to their liquidation but ultimately proved futile as they too were liquidated along with the remains of Eastern.

Bar Harbor's former northern routes continued to grow and develop operating as Continental Express, now under the Britt Airways operating certificate. By 1992, Continental Express gave up the original Bar Harbor route (Bar Harbor to Boston) to Colgan Air, as well as the Boston and LaGuardia hubs completely, consolidating East coast operations at Newark. Many of the former Bar Harbor and PBA cities (Bangor, Portland, Presque Isle, Burlington, Hartford, Manchester, Albany, Philadelphia, Hyannis) continued to operate with flights to Newark using ex-Bar Harbor ATR 42.

== Livery ==
During the 1970s, the airline featured a rather simple, small yellow cheatline livery on otherwise all-white airplanes. Later, a bold livery of single red and blue stripes separated by large blue stars was adopted. As an Eastern Express carrier, Bar Harbor utilized a modified Eastern Airlines color scheme including a flared "hockey stick" livery on the tail.

== Incidents and accidents ==
The following are major incidents and accidents that occurred involving Bar Harbor aircraft.

Bar Harbor Airlines Reported Incidents
Flight	Date	Aircraft	Location	Description	Casualties
Flight	Date	Aircraft	Location	Description	Fatal	Serious	Minor/Uninjured	Ground
Bar Harbor Airlines Flight 1808	August 25, 1985	Beechcraft Model 99	Auburn, Maine	The aircraft missed the runway of the Lewiston-Auburn Regional Airport in Auburn, Maine by 200 yards (180 m) and crashed, killing all six passengers and two crew members on board. Samantha Smith, a famous 13-year-old American school girl and "Goodwill Ambassador" to the Soviet Union was among those killed.	8	—	—	—

== See also ==
- List of defunct airlines of the United States
