= This I Believe =

American radio program on the CBS Radio Network from 1951 to 1955

- Genre: Scientific, philosophical investigation
- Running time: 5-30 minutes
- Country of origin: United States; Luxembourg; Canada
- Language: English
- Home station: CBS Radio Network (1951–1955); Radio Luxembourg (1956–1958); NPR (2005–2009); CBC Radio One (2007)
- Syndicates: PRI (2009–present)
- Hosted by: Edward R. Murrow; Dan Gediman; Jay Allison; Preston Manning
- Created by: Edward R. Murrow
- Directed by: Edward P. Morgan
- Original release: 1951 – 2009
- Audio format: Stereophonic
- Website: www.thisibelieve.org

This I Believe was originally a five-minute program, hosted by journalist Edward R. Murrow from 1951 to 1955 on CBS Radio Network. The show encouraged both famous and everyday people to write short essays about their own personal motivation in life and then read them on the air. This I Believe became a cultural phenomenon that stressed individual belief rather than religious dogma. Its popularity both developed and waned within the era of U.S. Senator Joseph McCarthy and the Cold War.

Since then, a variety of revivals have been hosted on different networks. A half-hour European version of This I Believe ran from 1956 to 1958 over Radio Luxembourg. It has since been revived numerous times in recent years, first by Dan Gediman and Jay Allison on NPR from 2005 to 2009, and subsequently by Preston Manning on Canada's CBC Radio One in 2007. Essays that appear on the show are available free of charge at its website.

Since 2009, the original This I Believe programs have been syndicated as part of PRI's Bob Edwards Weekend.

== History ==
=== Background ===
The idea for This I Believe flowed from both the WWII broadcasting experiences of Edward R. Murrow, who had spent the latter 1930s and most of the 1940s in the United Kingdom and continental Europe, and the emerging Cold War hostility with the Soviet Union.

During Murrow's stay in London he had become a friend of the World War II British Prime Minister Winston Churchill, who had an American mother and British father, and this enabled him to introduce Churchill to William S. Paley, who was his boss at CBS. During the war Paley spent much of his time in London working in the Psychological Warfare Branch of the Office of War Information (OWI), which included redirecting the transmitters of Radio Luxembourg following the liberation of the Grand Duchy, for use as a black propaganda station (Radio 1212). Meanwhile, Murrow had "covered the London air raids from the streets and rooftops ...went on 25 bombing missions over Germany and broadcast from a British minesweeper in World War II." This close relationship between Murrow, Paley, CBS and the British Establishment led to an offer after the war for Murrow to become part of the editorial diarchy at the British Broadcasting Corporation, an offer that was not endorsed by the BBC Board of Directors.

Murrow returned to the US which was in a growing Cold War with its former WWII partner, the Soviet Union. During these years of the late 1940s and early 1950s, political paranoia involving a Communist conspiracy was flowing from Washington, D.C., and it eventually came to be led by U.S. Senator Joseph McCarthy. Paley, with his CBS/OWI background, also became a firm supporter of the new Central Intelligence Agency after the war and allowed some of his part-time CBS newsmen to serve as CIA agents. His own Paley Foundation also became engaged in laundering money for the CIA and Paley allowed the creation of a CBS blacklist and Murrow was among the first to sign a CBS loyalty affirmation. At the same time the Pledge of Allegiance was being repackaged amid controversy as a general test of American loyalty at large, and it was into this climate of fear and agitation that Murrow introduced his new radio program: This I Believe.

Murrow's style of presentation had been influenced by a teacher of speech named Ida Lou Anderson. She suggested that he should become more concise in his opening presentations on radio. Cesar Saerchinger, his predecessor at CBS Europe had introduced his broadcasts with: "Hello America. This is London calling." Murrow abbreviated his own opening remarks to "This...is London" and he soon began adapting the prefix "this" to many titles including "This... I Believe". James Earl Jones became one of many to adopt the Murrow style when he later announced: "This...is CNN". Murrow was not without his critics at CBS, and some of his colleagues had formed their own "Murrow-Ain't-God Club"

=== Development ===
According to Ward Wheelock who wrote a preface to the 1952 book, This I Believe was launched in 1949 at a business luncheon of four men, Murrow being one, with the other three left unnamed. He related that the reasons for the project "were obvious":

...the uncertainty of the economic future, the shadow of war, the atom bomb, army service for one's self or loved ones, the frustration of young people facing the future.

=== CBS series (1951–1955) ===
The original five-minute series began at WCAU in Philadelphia and was aired over the CBS Radio Network and 196 affiliated stations between 1951 and 1955. The Program Director was Edward P. Morgan who told potential contributors that This I Believe was a "non-religious" program and that it was not a forum for one contributor to attack the beliefs of another contributor. The actual time allotted to each contributor in order to allow for the introduction, closing and sponsorship of the program, was three and a half minutes. Novelist Kathleen Norris refused to participate on the grounds that "It's either a mawkish sermon, or it's indecent exposure."

This I Believe was also relayed by U.S. government funding over the Voice of America and the U.S. Armed Forces Network to listeners in 97 foreign countries. The BBC World Service, funded by the British Foreign Office, relayed the program to Australia.

A print version of the show appeared in 85 U.S. newspapers where contributors were asked to submit essays containing no more than 600 words. The U.S. State Department offered these editions to foreign newspapers in 97 nations with which the USA had diplomatic relations.

In 1952 Simon & Schuster published This I Believe: Written for, and with a foreword by Edward R. Murrow and edited by Edward P. Morgan. Its cover stated that it contained: ...the personal philosophies of one hundred thoughtful men and women.

A cover description of its contents stated that:

"...this book is the further extension of an idea that has already exploded into the most widely listened to radio program in the world. That idea is simple. It is that men and women will live happier and richer lives if they deliberately decide what they want from life—what they want in material things and the relative importance of moral and spiritual things. You, like most people, undoubtedly have certain rules by which you run your life. But, again like most people, you've probably never tried to formulate them, even to yourself. That's where the men and women in this book differ from you. They have at least tried to do so. They have "looked in their hearts and written," humbly and hesitantly, upon the invitation of the distinguished radio and television news analyst, Edward R. Murrow. "After all," says he, "the only way of discovering what people believe is to ask them." What these thoughtful people, in all walks of life, have written is here for you to read and ponder, and perhaps to emulate—in this collection of the 100 of the best of the personal philosophies of life which Mr. Murrow has discovered among the many hundreds contributed to This I Believe—on the air and in newspapers."

The submission from author Robert Heinlein proved not only noteworthy, but of lasting impact. The organization says that it remains popular. Called Our Noble, Essential Decency, it broke from standard tropes to talk about the inherent goodness of Heinlein's friends, local community, country, and humanity of all races and creeds.

=== Radio Luxembourg series (1956–1958) ===
When the original American series ended, This I Believe was broadcast by Radio Luxembourg as a half-hour show over its famous "208" wavelength. It was described in programme listings as "the human drama programme telling of faith in times of trouble and adversity", and "the programme that brings you human drama and tells the story of people where courage and belief form an integral part of their life." While the 208 wavelength schedule of Radio Luxembourg was aimed at serving the British Isles with a commercial radio station format of American shows that were not provided by the monopoly of the non-commercial BBC, its actual audience covered much of Europe and beyond via its simultaneous transmissions over 49.26 meters in the Shortwave Band.

The first English language European series of This I Believe began on September 16, 1956, at 9:30 pm on Sundays under the sponsorship of the Co-operative Wholesale Society, Ltd. It was hosted by Sir Basil Bartlett who had a part in British WWII propaganda films. The script was written by James Carhatt and Nicholas Winter.

A second series began on October 6, 1957, and presented by host James McKechnie with research by Susan Franks and script written by James Eastwood.

The third series was hosted by Richard Hurndall and began on October 5, 1958, with a script written by Paul Tabori. This last series concentrated upon the lives of celebrities such as Shirley Bassey, Vanessa Lee and T. E. B. Clarke.

The series was produced by Monty Bailey-Watson in London where it was recorded by a unique process on to the audio tracks of film strips for later transmission from the Grand Duchy of Luxembourg. The final series ended when American originated talk shows that had been heard on Radio Luxembourg, began to give way to the increasing demand for sponsored record programmes (which could be produced at a lower cost for higher revenue), in order to satisfy the British demand for recorded music that was not available on the BBC.

=== NPR series (2005–2009) ===
This I Believe is a weekly radio series that began airing April 2005 in the United States on National Public Radio produced by Dan Gediman and Jay Allison. It was independently produced by Dan Gediman and Jay Allison from 2005 to 2009 for the non-profit organization This I Believe, Inc. The series invites individuals to write short essays about the core beliefs that guide their daily life. NPR aired these personal statements each week on their newsmagazine programs Morning Edition, All Things Considered, Weekend Edition Sunday and Tell Me More. On the February 16 episode, Allison announced that "our series will be finishing its four-year run in April." True to his word, the NPR series concluded on Sunday, April 26, 2009. However, the series continues with weekly segments on PRI's Bob Edwards Weekend and Sirius XM's The Bob Edwards Show.

=== CBC series (2007) ===
CBC Radio One began airing its own version of the show on May 14, 2007. The first forty essays were commissioned from prominent Canadians, including Julie Payette, Rick Hansen and Joe Clark, although subsequent essays are invited from the public. The show is hosted by former politician Preston Manning.

=== PRI series (since 2009) ===
In May 2009, This I Believe, Inc. moved its broadcast operations to the Public Radio International (PRI) program Bob Edwards Weekend and the related Sirius XM program The Bob Edwards Show. These programs feature a weekly This I Believe segment which airs first on Fridays on Sirius XM then on the following weekend on PRI's Bob Edwards Weekend. From May 2009 until August 2010, Edwards each week interviewed This I Believe, Inc.'s Executive Director Dan Gediman about a different episode of Murrow's 1950s radio series, which was then heard in its entirety. Beginning in September 2010, Edwards has each week been airing a new contemporary This I Believe essay, written by one of the tens of thousands of listeners who have submitted essays to This I Believe, Inc. since the beginning of their public radio series in 2005.

== Merchandise ==
Compilations of This I Believe essays were published from 1953 until 1996. The books were translated into several different languages and distributed internationally. Edward P. Morgan and John Marsden acted as editors for the original book series. A record titled This I Believe: The Personal Philosophies of Ten Living Americans, with commentary by Edward R. Murrow, was released along with the original books.

In 2006, a new book called This I Believe: The Personal Philosophies of Remarkable Men and Women was published. It was a collection of sixty essays from the NPR series, plus twenty essays from Murrow's original series. The audio version won the 2007 Audie Award for Short Stories/Collection. Another book, This I Believe: On Love was published in 2010. It collects sixty new essays from public radio listeners on the subject of love. This I Believe: Life Lessons was published in October 2011. It is a collection of essays on the personal beliefs and guiding principles in American life.

== See also ==
- Edward R. Murrow, creator and original host of the program
- Edward P. Morgan, original director of the program
- CBS Radio Network
