= Auburn/Lewiston Municipal Airport =

Auburn-Lewiston Airport
- IATA: LEW; ICAO: KLEW; FAA LID: LEW

Summary
- Airport type: Public
- Owner/Operator: Cities of Auburn and Lewiston
- Serves: Auburn and Lewiston, Maine, U.S.
- Elevation AMSL: 288 ft (88 m)
- Coordinates: 44°02′55″N 070°17′01″W
- Website: www.FlyToMaine.com

Maps
- FAA airport diagram
- Interactive map of Auburn-Lewiston Airport

Runways
Direction	Length		Surface
Direction	ft	m	Surface
4/22	5,001	1,524	Asphalt
17/35	2,750	838	Asphalt

Statistics (2020)
- Aircraft operations (year ending 8/19/2020): 50,000
- Based aircraft: 53
- Sources: airport website, FAA

Auburn-Lewiston Airport (IATA: LEW, ICAO: KLEW, FAA LID: LEW) is a public airport in Androscoggin County, Maine, United States. It opened in 1935. It is five miles southwest of the cities of Auburn and Lewiston, which jointly own and operate the airport.

The airport is not served by any commercial airline, but is served by several charter airlines. The airport was the site of the Bar Harbor Airlines Flight 1808 accident, which killed Samantha Smith, who gained global fame following her correspondence with Soviet leader Yuri Andropov during the Cold War.

== Lewiston NAAF ==
During World War II, the airfield was under the control of the United States Navy for use as a base for anti-submarine patrols by Squadron VS-31. It was commissioned on 15 April 1943 as Naval Auxiliary Air Facility Lewiston, and used along with Naval Air Station Brunswick to train British and American torpedo bomber pilots until 1945. Naval operations ceased on 1 December 1945, and the site was declared a surplus in 1946 and handed returned to the cities of Auburn and Lewiston in 1947 and 1948.

== Historical airline service ==
Auburn-Lewiston was served by Northeast Airlines on a route between Boston and Presque Isle, Maine from the mid 1930's through 1970. Several commuter airlines then served the airport including Executive Airlines (1970–1975), Air New England (1975–1981), Bar Harbor Airlines (1981–1987), and the final carrier, Northeast Express Regional Airlines (1987–1989). Bar Harbor became Eastern Express on behalf or Eastern Air Lines during its final years of 1986 and 1987. The airport has not seen commercial air service since 1989.

== Facilities and aircraft ==
Auburn-Lewiston Airport covers 565 acres (229 ha) at an elevation of 288 feet (88 m) above mean sea level. It has two asphalt runways: 4/22 is 5,001 by 100 feet (1,524 x 30 m) and 17/35 is 2,750 by 75 feet (838 x 23 m).

In the year ending August 19, 2020, the airport had 50,000 aircraft operations, average 137 per day: 72% general aviation, 28% air taxi, and <1% military. 53 aircraft were then based at this airport: 39 single-engine, 9 multi-engine, 1 jet, and 4 helicopter.

== Accidents ==
On August 25, 1985, Bar Harbor Airlines Flight 1808, carrying six passengers and two crew, attempted to land at the airport when it crashed 500 feet to the right of the airport's runway centerline, killing all passengers and crew. A subsequent investigation determined that the crash was due to a combination of factors, including weather conditions, incorrect altimeter settings, and pilot error. The accident attracted global attention since one of its passengers was Samantha Smith, a 13-year-old peace activist from Houlton, Maine who gained global notoriety following her correspondence with Soviet leader Yuri Andropov during the Cold War.

== See also ==
- List of airports in Maine
