= List of airlines of the United States Virgin Islands =

This is a list of airlines currently operating in United States Virgin Islands.

Airline	Image	IATA	ICAO	Callsign	Commenced operations
Aero Gorda		DV			
Coastal Air		DQ	CXT		1976
Seaborne Airlines		BB	SBS	SEABORNE	1992

== See also ==
- Lists of airlines
- List of defunct airlines of the United States Virgin Islands
