= Samantha Smith =

American child peace activist (1972–1985)

- Smith in 1983
- Born: Samantha Reed Smith; June 29, 1972; Houlton, Maine, US
- Died: August 25, 1985 (aged 13); Auburn, Maine, US
- Cause of death: Airplane crash
- Resting place: Ashes buried at Estabrook Cemetery, Amity, Maine
- Other names: America's Youngest Ambassador; America's Littlest Diplomat; America's Sweetheart (US); The Goodwill Ambassador (USSR)
- Occupations: Peace activist; child actress
- Years active: 1982–1985

Samantha Reed Smith (June 29, 1972 – August 25, 1985) was an American peace activist and child actress who became famous for her anti-war outreaches during the Cold War between the United States and the Soviet Union. In 1982, Smith wrote a letter to the newly appointed General Secretary of the Communist Party of the Soviet Union, Yuri Andropov, and received a personal reply with an invitation to visit the Soviet Union, which she accepted.

Smith attracted extensive media attention in both countries as a "Goodwill Ambassador", becoming known as America's Youngest Ambassador and subsequently participating in peacemaking activities in Japan. With the assistance of her father, Arthur (an academic), she wrote a book titled Journey to the Soviet Union, which chronicled her visit to the country. She later became a child actress, hosting a child-oriented special on the 1984 United States presidential election for The Disney Channel and playing a co-starring role in the television series Lime Street. Smith died at the age of 13 in 1985, onboard Bar Harbor Airlines Flight 1808, which crashed short of the runway on final approach to the Auburn/Lewiston Municipal Airport in Maine.

== Historical context ==
When Yuri Andropov succeeded Leonid Brezhnev as leader of the Soviet Union in November 1982, the mainstream Western newspapers and magazines ran numerous front-page photographs and articles about him. Most coverage was negative and tended to give a perception of a new threat to the stability of the Western World. Andropov had been the Soviet Ambassador to Hungary during the 1956 Hungarian Revolution, which was put down by the Soviet Army, and the Chairman of the KGB from 1967 to 1982; during his tenure, he was known in the West for crushing the Prague Spring and the brutal suppression of dissidents, such as Andrei Sakharov and Aleksandr Solzhenitsyn. He began his tenure as Soviet leader by strengthening the powers of the KGB, and by suppressing dissidents. According to Vasili Mitrokhin, Andropov saw the struggle for human rights as a part of a wide-ranging imperialist plot to undermine the foundation of the Soviet state. Much international tension surrounded both Soviet and American efforts to develop weapons capable of being launched from satellites in orbit. Both governments had extensive research and development programs to develop such technology. However, both nations were coming under increasing pressure to disband the project. In the United States, President Ronald Reagan came under pressure from a lobby of US scientists and arms experts, while in the Soviet Union the government issued a statement that read, "To prevent the militarization of space is one of the most urgent tasks facing mankind".

At the time, large anti-nuclear protests were taking place across both Europe and North America, in the midst of which the November 20, 1983, screening of ABC's post-nuclear war dramatization The Day After became one of the most anticipated media events of the decade.

The two superpowers had by this point abandoned their strategy of détente and in response to the deployment of the Soviet Union's new SS-20, NATO deployed cruise and Pershing II missiles in Europe. The 1979–1989 Soviet–Afghan War was also into its third year. In this atmosphere, on November 22, 1982, Time magazine published an issue with Andropov on the cover. When Smith viewed the edition, she asked her mother: "If people are so afraid of him, why doesn't someone write a letter asking whether he wants to have a war or not?" Her mother replied, "Why don't you?"

== Life ==
Samantha Smith was born on June 29, 1972, in the small town of Houlton, Maine, on the Canada–United States border, to Jane Goshorn and Arthur Smith. At the age of five, she wrote a letter to Queen Elizabeth II (whose reign's silver jubilee fell in 1977) to express her admiration to the British monarch. When Smith had finished second grade in spring 1980, the family settled in Manchester, Maine, where she attended Manchester Elementary School. Her father served as an instructor at Ricker College in Houlton before teaching literature and writing at the University of Maine at Augusta while her mother worked as a social worker with the Maine Department of Human Services.

In November 1982, when Smith was 10, she wrote to Soviet leader Yuri Andropov, seeking to understand why Soviet Union–United States relations were so tense:

Dear Mr. Andropov,

My name is Samantha Smith. I am 10 years old. Congratulations on your new job. I have been worrying about Russia and the United States getting into a nuclear war. Are you going to vote to have a war or not? If you aren't please tell me how you are going to help to not have a war. This question you do not have to answer, but I would like it if you would. Why do you want to conquer the world or at least our country? God made the world for us to share and take care of. Not to fight over or have one group of people own it all. Please lets do what he wanted and have everybody be happy too.

Samantha Smith

Her letter was published in the Soviet state-run newspaper Pravda. Smith was happy to discover that her letter had been published. However, she had not received a reply. She then sent a letter to Soviet ambassador to the United States Anatoly Dobrynin asking if Andropov intended to respond. On April 26, 1983, she received a response from Andropov:

Dear Samantha,

I received your letter, which is like many others that have reached me recently from your country and from other countries around the world.

It seems to me—I can tell by your letter—that you are a courageous and honest girl, resembling Becky, the friend of Tom Sawyer in the famous book of your compatriot Mark Twain. This book is well known and loved in our country by all boys and girls.

You write that you are anxious about whether there will be a nuclear war between our two countries. And you ask are we doing anything so that war will not break out.

Your question is the most important of those that every thinking man can pose. I will reply to you seriously and honestly.

Yes, Samantha, we in the Soviet Union are trying to do everything so that there will not be war on Earth. This is what every Soviet man wants. This is what the great founder of our state, Vladimir Lenin, taught us.

Soviet people well know what a terrible thing war is. Forty-two years ago, Nazi Germany, which strove for supremacy over the whole world, attacked our country, burned and destroyed many thousands of our towns and villages, killed millions of Soviet men, women and children.

In that war, which ended with our victory, we were in alliance with the United States: together we fought for the liberation of many people from the Nazi invaders. I hope that you know about this from your history lessons in school. And today we want very much to live in peace, to trade and cooperate with all our neighbors on this earth—with those far away and those near by. And certainly with such a great country as the United States of America.

In America and in our country there are nuclear weapons—terrible weapons that can kill millions of people in an instant. But we do not want them to be ever used. That's precisely why the Soviet Union solemnly declared throughout the entire world that never will it use nuclear weapons first against any country. In general we propose to discontinue further production of them and to proceed to the abolition of all the stockpiles on Earth.

It seems to me that this is a sufficient answer to your second question: 'Why do you want to wage war against the whole world or at least the United States?' We want nothing of the kind. No one in our country–neither workers, peasants, writers nor doctors, neither grown-ups nor children, nor members of the government–want either a big or 'little' war.

We want peace—there is something that we are occupied with: growing wheat, building and inventing, writing books and flying into space. We want peace for ourselves and for all peoples of the planet. For our children and for you, Samantha.

I invite you, if your parents will let you, to come to our country, the best time being this summer. You will find out about our country, meet with your contemporaries, visit an international children's camp—Artek—on the sea. And see for yourself: in the Soviet Union, everyone is for peace and friendship among peoples.

Thank you for your letter. I wish you all the best in your young life.

Y. Andropov

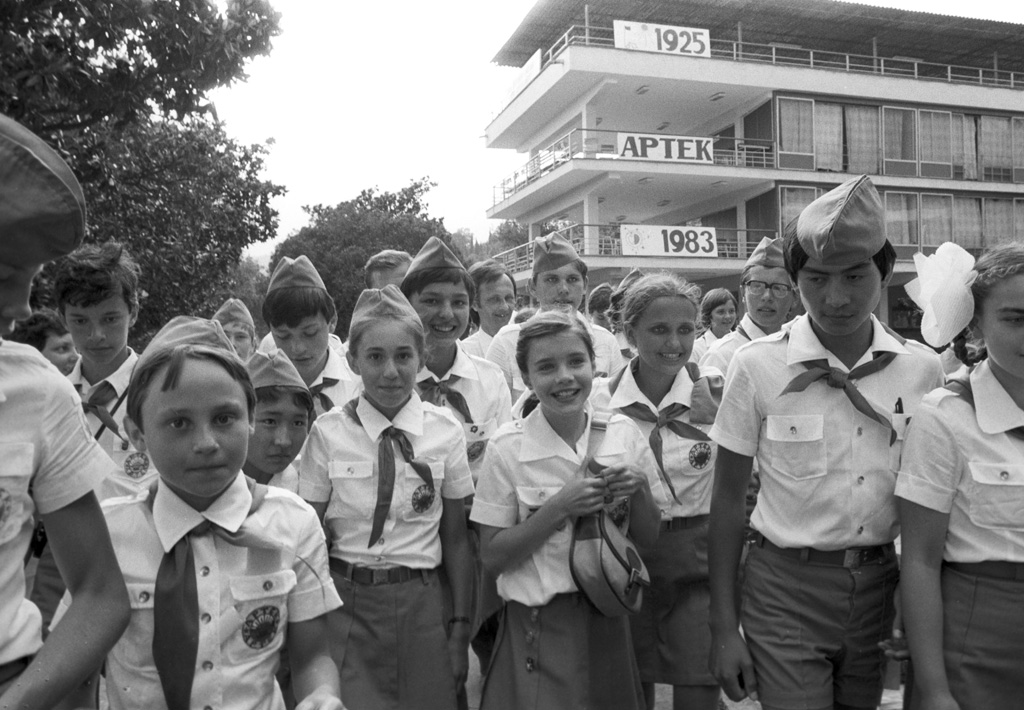
Samantha Smith (center) visiting the USSR upon the invitation of General Secretary of the Central Committee of CPSU Yuri Andropov in all-Union Artek pioneer camp

A media circus ensued, with Smith being interviewed by Ted Koppel and Johnny Carson, among others, and with nightly reports by the major American networks. On July 7, 1983, she flew to Moscow with her parents, and spent two weeks as Andropov's guest. During the trip she visited Moscow and Leningrad and spent time in Artek, the main Soviet pioneer camp, in the town of Gurzuf on the Crimean Peninsula. Speaking at a Moscow press conference, she declared that the Russians were "just like us". In Artek, Smith chose to stay with the Soviet children rather than accept the privileged accommodations offered to her. For ease of communication, teachers and children who spoke fluent English were chosen to stay in the building where she was lodged. Smith shared a dormitory with nine other girls, and spent her time there swimming, talking and learning Russian songs and dances. While there, she made many friends, including Natasha Kashirina from Leningrad, a fluent English speaker.

Samantha spontaneously participated in the documentary film The Capital of Childhood, dedicated to the 60th anniversary of Artek. Together with Natasha, she performed the song "May There Always Be Sunshine!". Cinematographer Nikolai Zherekhov recalled: "An ordinary child, she was no different from our boys and girls, maybe she was more liberated, our guys were a little restrained at first. I remember her extraordinary, kind, sunny, lively and sincere smile, there was no stardom in it."

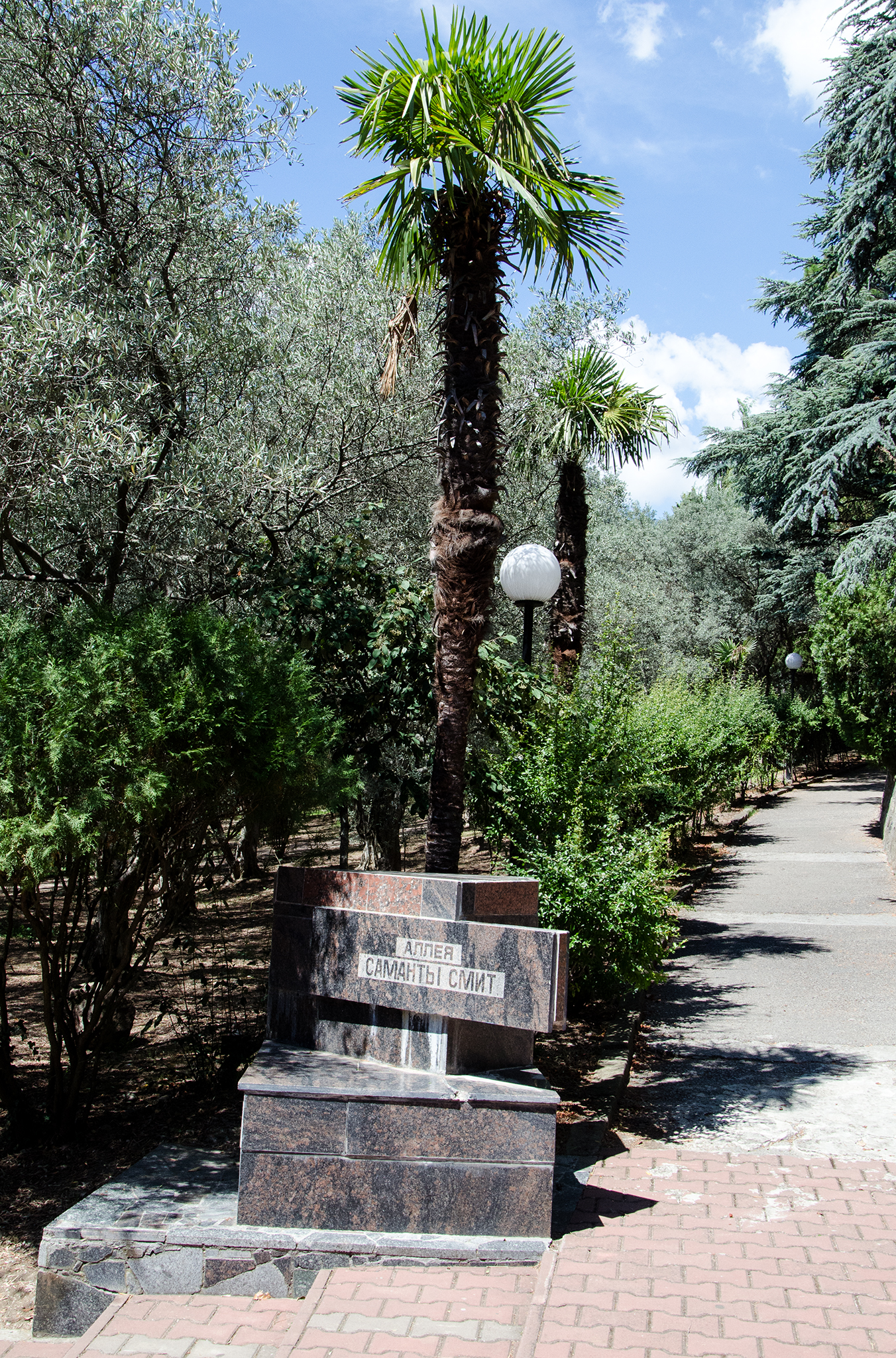
Samantha Smith Alley in Artek Camp "Morskoy"

Andropov, however, was unable to meet with her during her visit, although they did speak by telephone. It was later discovered that Andropov had become seriously ill and had withdrawn from the public eye during this time. Smith also met with Russian cosmonaut Valentina Tereshkova, the first woman to orbit the Earth, and visited an experimental fruit station in Malen'koe village. Media followed her every step—photographs and articles about her were published by the main Soviet newspapers and magazines throughout her trip and after it. Smith became widely known to Soviet citizens and was well regarded by many of them. In the United States, the event drew suspicion and some regarded it as an "American-style public relations stunt".

Smith's return to the US on July 22, 1983, was celebrated by the people of Maine with roses, a red carpet, and a limousine and her popularity continued to grow in her native country. Some critics at the time remained skeptical, believing Smith was unwittingly serving as an instrument of Soviet propaganda. In December 1983, continuing in her role as "America's Youngest Ambassador", she was invited to Japan, where she met with the Prime Minister Yasuhiro Nakasone and attended the Children's International Symposium in Kobe. In her speech at the symposium, she suggested that Soviet and American leaders exchange granddaughters for two weeks every year, arguing that a president "wouldn't want to send a bomb to a country his granddaughter would be visiting". Her trip inspired other exchanges of child goodwill ambassadors, including a visit by the eleven-year-old Russian child Katya Lycheva to the United States. Later, Smith wrote a book called Journey to the Soviet Union whose cover shows her at Artek, her favorite part of the Soviet trip.

Smith pursued her role as a media celebrity when in 1984, billed as a "Special Correspondent", she hosted a children's special for The Disney Channel entitled Samantha Smith Goes To Washington... Campaign '84. The show covered politics, where Smith interviewed several candidates for the 1984 Democratic Party presidential primaries, including George McGovern, John Glenn and Jesse Jackson. That same year, she guest starred in Charles in Charge as Kim, alongside another celebrity guest star, Julianne McNamara. Her fame resulted in Smith becoming the subject of stalker Robert John Bardo, the man who would later go on to stalk and ultimately murder My Sister Sam actress Rebecca Schaeffer. Bardo traveled to Maine in an attempt to meet Smith; however, he aborted his attempt when being given a citation by police. Concerned that he was drawing too much attention to himself, Bardo returned home. He later confessed to finding new ways to stalk Smith, but her later death terminated his master plan.

In 1985, she played the co-starring role of the elder daughter to Robert Wagner's character in the television series Lime Street.

== Death ==
On August 25, 1985, Smith and her father were returning home aboard Bar Harbor Airlines Flight 1808 after filming a segment for Lime Street. While attempting to land at Lewiston-Auburn Regional Airport in Auburn, Maine, the Beechcraft 99 commuter plane struck some trees 4,007 feet (1,221 m) short of the runway and crashed, killing all six passengers and two crew on board.

Much speculation regarding the cause of the accident circulated afterwards. Accusations of foul play circulated widely in the Soviet Union. A CIA report written in 1985 reads: "Although no direct allegations of foul play have appeared in the Soviet media, people from ordinary citizens to intellectuals seem to believe that Samantha was silenced so that she could not continue her efforts to build goodwill toward the Soviet Union".

An investigation was undertaken in the United States and the official report—which did not show evidence of foul play—was made public. The report said the plane crashed one mile (1.6 km) south-west of the airport at 22:05 EDT, and concluded that "the relatively steep flight path angle and the attitude (the orientation of the aircraft relative to the horizon, direction of motion etc.) and speed of the airplane at ground impact precluded the occupants from surviving the accident". The report also went on to say that it was a rainy night, that the pilots operating the aircraft were inexperienced, and an accidental, but not uncommon and not usually critical, ground radar failure occurred.

About 1,000 people attended Smith's funeral at St. Mary's Catholic Church in Augusta, Maine. She was eulogized in Moscow as a champion of peace. Attendees included actor Robert Wagner and Vladimir Kulagin of the Soviet Embassy in Washington, D.C., who read a personal message of condolence from Mikhail Gorbachev.

Everyone in the Soviet Union who has known Samantha Smith will forever remember the image of the American girl who, like millions of Soviet young men and women, dreamt about peace, and about friendship between the peoples of the United States and the Soviet Union.

President Ronald Reagan sent his condolences to Smith's mother, in writing:

Perhaps you can take some measure of comfort in the knowledge that millions of Americans, indeed millions of people, share the burdens of your grief. They also will cherish and remember Samantha, her smile, her idealism and unaffected sweetness of spirit.

The remains of Samantha and her father were cremated, and their ashes were buried at Estabrook Cemetery, Amity, Maine.

== Legacy ==
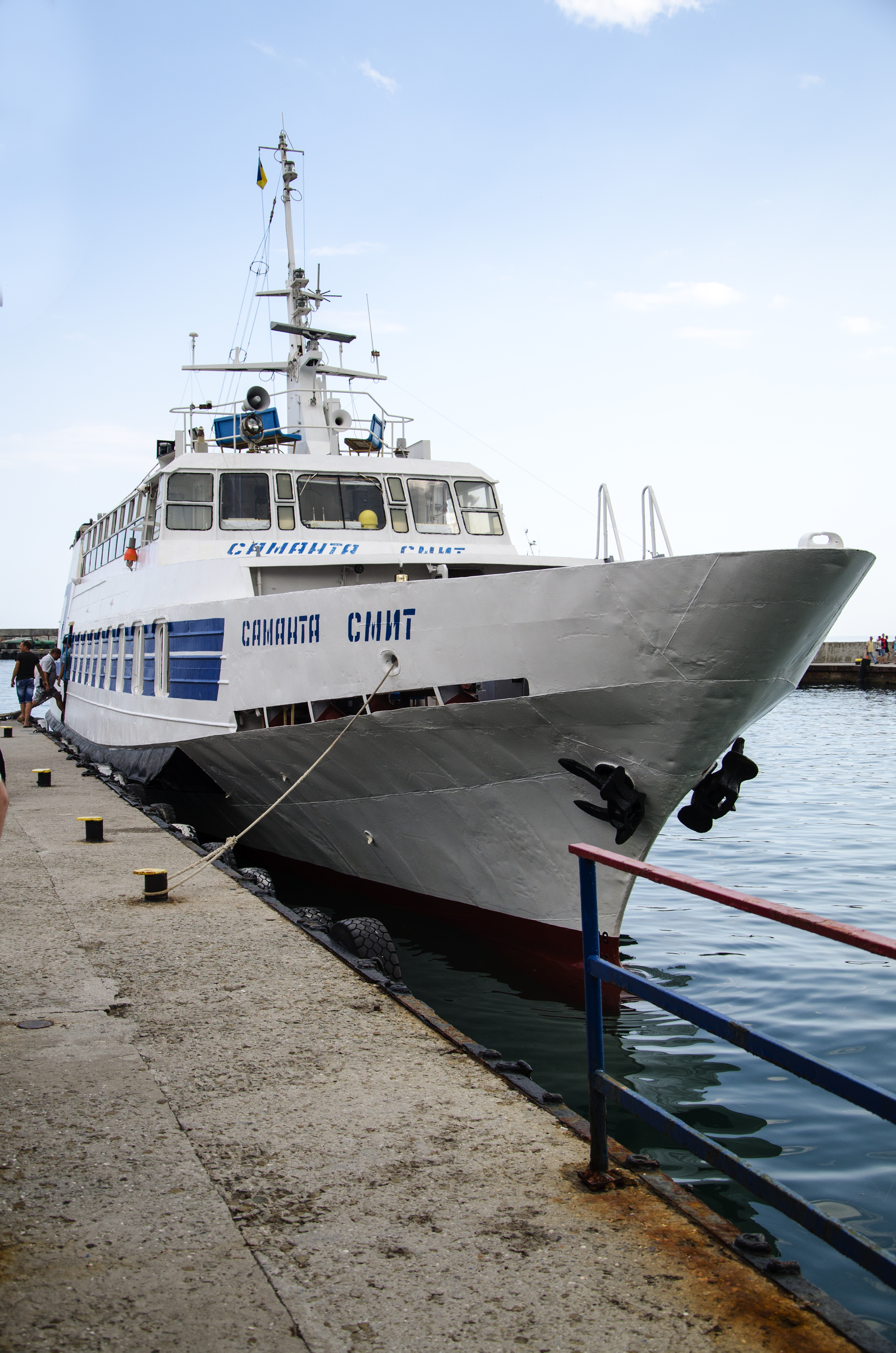
Boat "Саманта Смит" ("Samantha Smith" in Russian), built in 1986 and named in honor of Smith in Yalta Sea Port

Smith's contributions have been honored with a number of tributes by Russians and by the people of her home state of Maine. A monument to her was built in Moscow; "Samantha Smith Alley" in the Artek Young Pioneer camp was named after her in 1986. The monument built to Smith was stolen by metal thieves in 2003 following the dissolution of the Soviet Union in 1991. In 2003, Voronezh retiree Valentin Vaulin built a monument to her after raising funds from private donations. The Soviet Union issued a commemorative stamp with her likeness. In 1986, Russian astronomer Lyudmila Chernykh discovered asteroid 3147, which she named 3147 Samantha. Danish composer Per Nørgård wrote his 1985 viola concerto "Remembering Child" in memory of Smith. A diamond found in Siberia, a mountain in the former Soviet Union, a cultivar of tulips and of dahlias, and an ocean vessel have been named in Smith's honor. In 1985, a peace garden was established in Michigan along the St. Clair River to commemorate her achievements. In Maine, the first Monday in June of each year is officially designated as Samantha Smith Day by state law. There is a bronze statue of Smith near the Maine State Museum in Augusta, which portrays Smith releasing a dove with a bear cub resting at her feet. The bear cub represents both Maine and Russia. There are streets named after Samantha Smith in the settlements of Buryatia and the Bryansk region (Russia), as well as in Kazakhstan. Elementary schools in Sammamish, Washington, and in Jamaica, Queens, New York City, have been named after Samantha. In October 1985, Smith's mother founded The Samantha Smith Foundation, which fostered student exchanges between the United States and the Soviet Union (and, after December 1991, the ex-Soviet successor states) until it became dormant in the mid-1990s. The Foundation was formally dissolved in 2014 after two decades of dormancy.

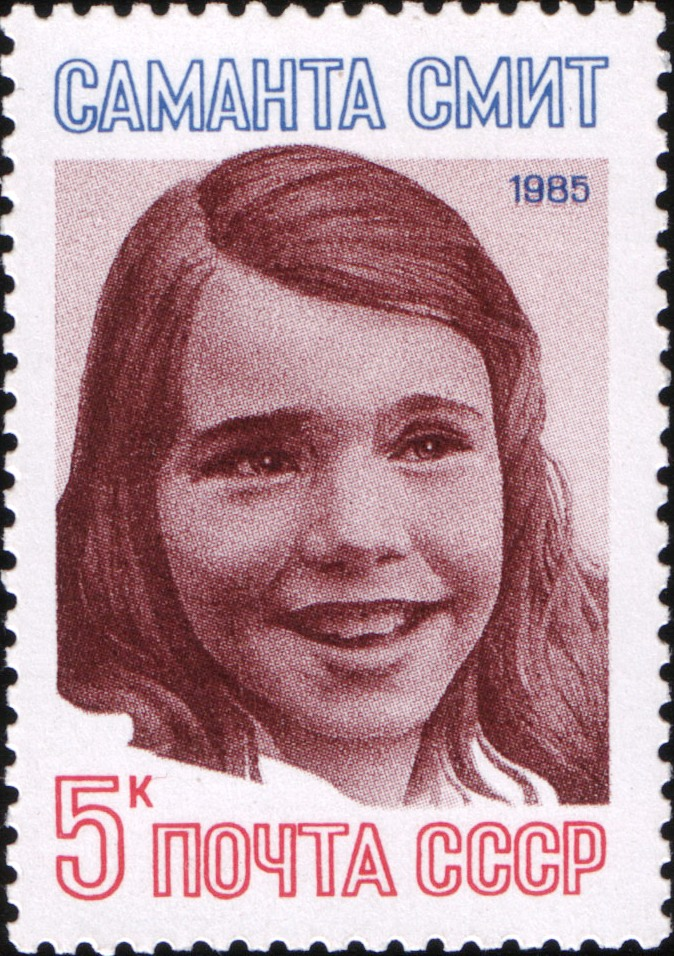
1985 USSR stamp with "Samantha Smith" in Russian

A 1987 episode of the US sitcom The Golden Girls entitled "Letter to Gorbachev" draws inspiration from Smith's story. In addition, the 1987 film Superman IV: The Quest for Peace included a scene where a boy writes Superman a letter to control the nuclear arms race; according to Christopher Reeve, this scene was also inspired by Smith's story.

In the mid-1980s, after Smith's death, a script was written for a television movie titled The Samantha Smith Story with Robert Wagner as producer. Columbia Pictures Television and R. J. Wagner Productions were reported to have agreed to produce the film for NBC, with Soviet company Sovin Film interested in co-producing it. Ultimately, Columbia Pictures Television decided not to film it due to lack of interest from any network.

Speculation as to what a surviving Samantha might have done in adulthood was dismissed by her mother Jane as unanswerable in 2003, given Samantha was only thirteen when she died and her ambitions had varied from a veterinarian to a ballerina. The notion, which had been put to Samantha herself in the eighties, that she could be President of the United States in adulthood, was dismissed by her in the Disney Channel special that she hosted, with the words "being President is not a job I would like to have".

In 2008, Smith posthumously received the Peace Abbey Courage of Conscience Award for "helping to bring about better understanding between the peoples of the [USA and the USSR], and as a result, reduce the tension between the superpowers that were poised to engage in nuclear war". The Peace Abbey has also proposed The Peace Literature Project in Honor of Samantha Smith "to educate students about peace and promote peace literature for school-age children in 50 selected pilot schools across the United States".

Elliott Holt's 2013 novel You Are One of Them, uses the story of Smith as inspiration for a fictional character, Jennifer Jones.

On the 30th anniversary of the plane crash in 2015, the Maine State Museum opened a new exhibit of materials related to Smith, including photographs of her time at the Artek camp, traditional Russian clothing she was given, and an issue of Soviet Life magazine with her on the cover.

Pioneer shift No. 7 at Artek—from June 20 to July 11—is called "Samantha's Smile". During this shift, the center "becomes a Young Diplomacy School, each camp turns into a kind of peacekeeping corps." There is also a "Samantha's Place" in the Artek Museum.

In July 2023, a bronze monument to Samantha Smith was unveiled in Artek. The inscription is stamped on the pedestal: "May There Always Be Sunshine".

A 2025 theatrical production called SpaceBridge, created and directed by Irina Kruzhilina at the La MaMa Theatre in New York City, tells a story of Samantha Smith, as an imagined adult, guiding stories told by real-life refugee children.

== See also ==
- List of peace activists
- Sarah York, another American girl who wrote to a foreign political leader, in this case Manuel Noriega
