= Bar Harbor Airlines Flight 1808 =

1985 aviation accident

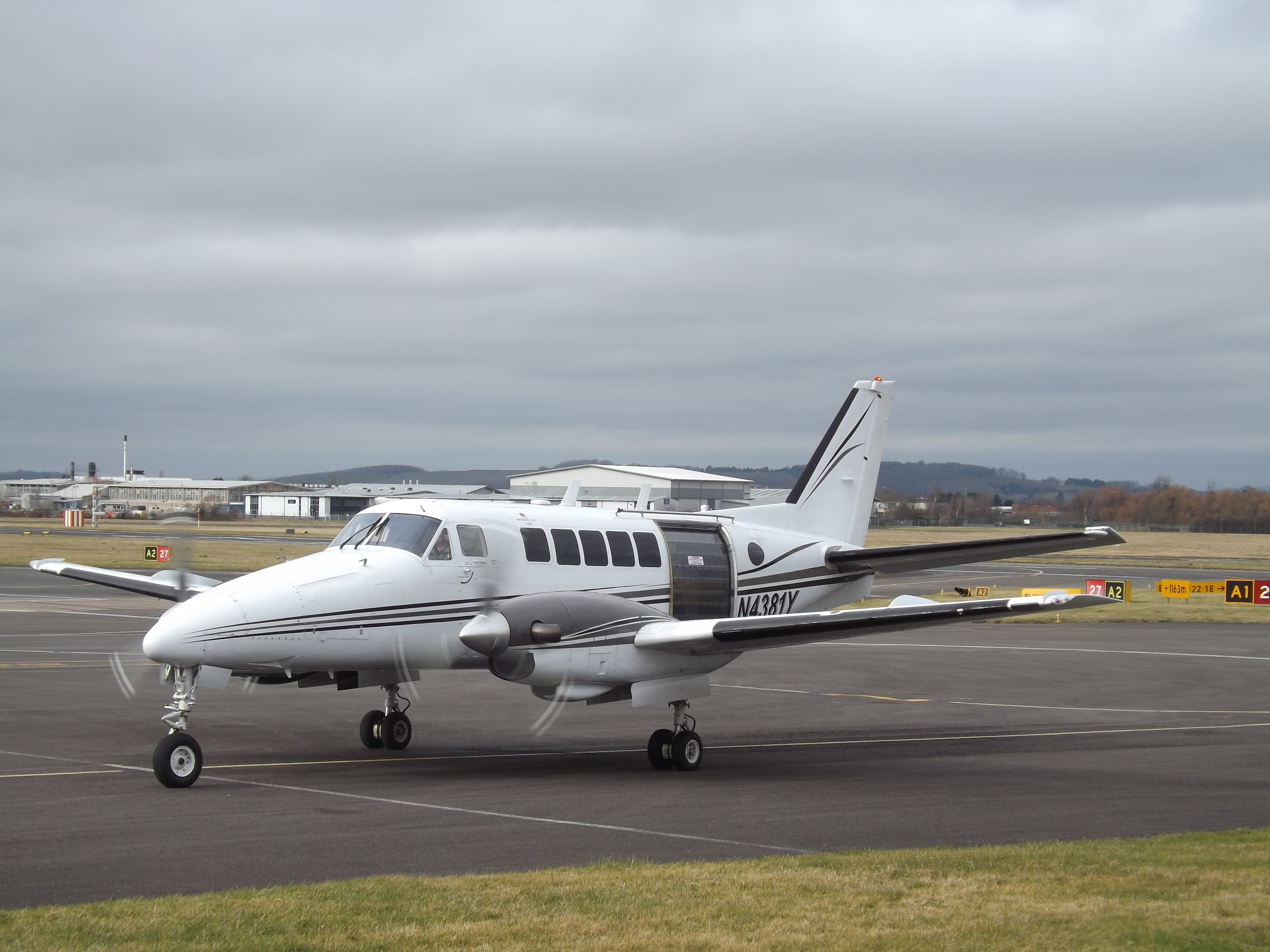
- A Beech 99 similar to the accident aircraft

Accident
- Date: August 25, 1985
- Summary: Controlled flight into terrain
- Site: Auburn, Maine, United States; 44°01′57″N 070°17′32″W

Aircraft
- Aircraft type: Beech 99
- Operator: Bar Harbor Airlines
- Registration: N300WP
- Flight origin: Logan International Airport, Boston, Massachusetts
- 1st stopover: Auburn/Lewiston Municipal Airport, Auburn, Maine
- 2nd stopover: Waterville Robert LaFleur Airport, Waterville, Maine
- 3rd stopover: Augusta State Airport, Augusta, Maine
- Destination: Bangor International Airport, Bangor, Maine
- Occupants: 8
- Passengers: 6
- Crew: 2
- Fatalities: 8
- Survivors: 0

Bar Harbor Airlines Flight 1808 was a scheduled flight from Logan International Airport to Bangor International Airport in the United States on August 25, 1985. On final approach to Auburn/Lewiston Municipal Airport, the Bar Harbor Airlines Beechcraft Model 99 crashed short of the runway, killing all six passengers and two crew on board. Among the passengers was Samantha Smith, a 13-year-old American schoolgirl who had become famous as a goodwill ambassador to the Soviet Union and had been cast on the television show Lime Street.

== Flight history ==
Flight 1808 was scheduled to stop in Augusta and Waterville, Maine, on its route from Logan International Airport in Boston to Bangor International Airport in Bangor, Maine. The flight crew consisted of captain Roy W. Fraunhofer and first officer David C. Owen, who had flown the aircraft from Bangor to Boston and back earlier that afternoon in increasingly worsening weather. On the second trip, they were advised while on the ground in Augusta that because of air-traffic control delays in Boston, their return flight 1788 via Auburn/Lewiston, Maine, would be canceled. They would instead operate the later Flight 1808 with Auburn added as a flag stop to accommodate passengers from Flight 1788.

Flight 1808 boarded in Boston with six passengers: two for Auburn, three for Augusta and one for Waterville. A fourth passenger had checked in for Augusta but did not respond to boarding calls and missed the flight. At 21:17 EDT, the captain radioed for clearance to Auburn. The controller, unaware of the change in routing, advised that Flight 1808's filed destination was Augusta. The captain accepted the routing but advised that he would amend the flight plan to Auburn after passing Pease VOR near Portsmouth, New Hampshire. Flight 1808 departed the ramp at 21:26 and was cleared for takeoff from Runway 4L at 21:30.

At about 22:00, Flight 1808 radioed the station agent at Auburn/Lewiston Municipal Airport for the latest weather. The agent reported a 300 foot (90 m) obscured, indefinite ceiling with visibility of 1 mile (1,600 m) in light drizzle and winds of 020° (north-northeast) at 4 miles per hour (6 km/h). The altimeter setting was supposed to be 30.24 inches of mercury (1,024 hPa). Shortly after this call, a controller in Portland contacted Flight 1808 to advise that they were drifting east of the ILS approach course to Runway 4 at Auburn. He advised them to turn to heading 340 to intercept. The captain responded "OK." Almost a minute later, the controller advised Flight 1808 that they were passing the Lewie NDB beacon at the outer marker for the approach and asked if they were receiving the signal. The first officer responded "affirmative." The controller then cleared Flight 1808 to switch to the Auburn airport's frequency. This transmission was acknowledged by Flight 1808’s first officer and was the last transmission received from the crew. Portland controllers were notified less than 10 minutes later that the plane had crashed at 22:05.

== Passengers ==
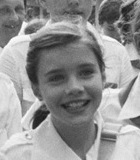
Samantha Smith, July 1983

Two of the three passengers headed for Augusta were Samantha Smith and her father, who were returning from London, England. Three years earlier, she had written to Soviet General Secretary Yuri Andropov regarding her desire for peace between the United States and the Soviet Union. Andropov replied with an invitation for the Smiths to tour the Soviet Union. In 1985, ABC hired her as an actress on its new television show Lime Street, which was filmed on location in London. She and her father were headed home during a break from shooting.

== Investigation ==
Accident investigators were hindered by the absence of information from either a cockpit voice recorder or flight data recorder, as the size of the Beechcraft 99 was below the FAA limit for mandatory recorders. There was also no record of which pilot was flying the aircraft. Both pilots had used the radio during the flight although the non-flying pilot typically handles communications. It took more than three months to transcribe the communications between the plane and ground control and provide the transcript to investigators.

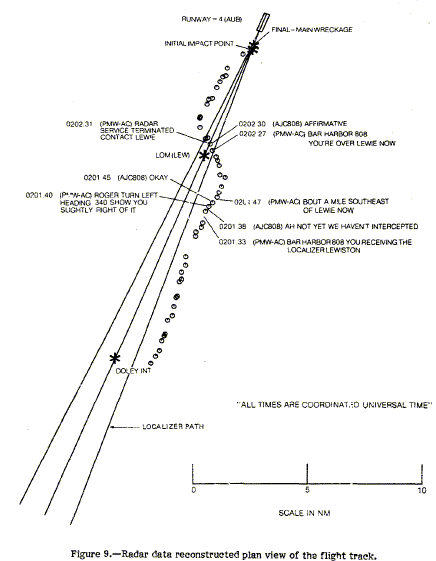
The flight's track during final approach

Examination of radar data from Portland showed that after Flight 1808 turned to a heading of 340° to intercept the approach, it flew through the approach course and had to make a 60° right turn less than 1 nautical mile (1.9 km; 1.2 mi) from the outer marker to turn onto the approach course. Altitude data from the aircraft’s transponder showed that Flight 1808 did not begin its descent to intercept the precision approach until after passing Lewiston, when the plane was already above the glide slope for the approach. This may have caused the flight crew to rush both the descent and the approach and descend too steeply. The actual altimeter settings on both the captain's and the first officer's altimeters could not be determined because of fire and impact damage. The aircraft flew into trees 4,007 feet (1,221 m) from the end of Runway 4 and struck the ground 440 feet (130 m) to the right of the extended runway center line. There were no survivors.

In its report, the National Transportation Safety Board (NTSB) noted that the controller in Portland used "poor judgment" while assisting the flight. However, it concluded that the captain accepted the large course correction and that the crew continued flying an unstabilized approach instead of executing a missed approach. The crew also attempted to stabilize the approach while allowing the plane to fly below the glide slope of the approach. The altimeter settings may have been incorrect, which could explain why the crew descended below the published decision height for the approach. At night and in low visibility, the crew may have been unaware of their true position.

The NTSB recommended a review of controller procedures for outlying airports without ground radar to align with best practices. For example, the 60° turn less than 1 mile (1.6 km) from the outer marker for the approach at Auburn was directed by the Portland controller even though that maneuver would have violated approach guidelines for radar-assisted arrivals at Portland International Jetport. The NTSB further recommended that aircraft for hire that were capable of carrying six or more passengers be equipped with flight recorders.

== Aftermath ==
Jane Smith, Samantha's mother, filed a $50 million wrongful death suit against Bar Harbor Airlines in 1986. The case was settled out of court three years later for an undisclosed sum.
