= Jay Allison =

American journalist

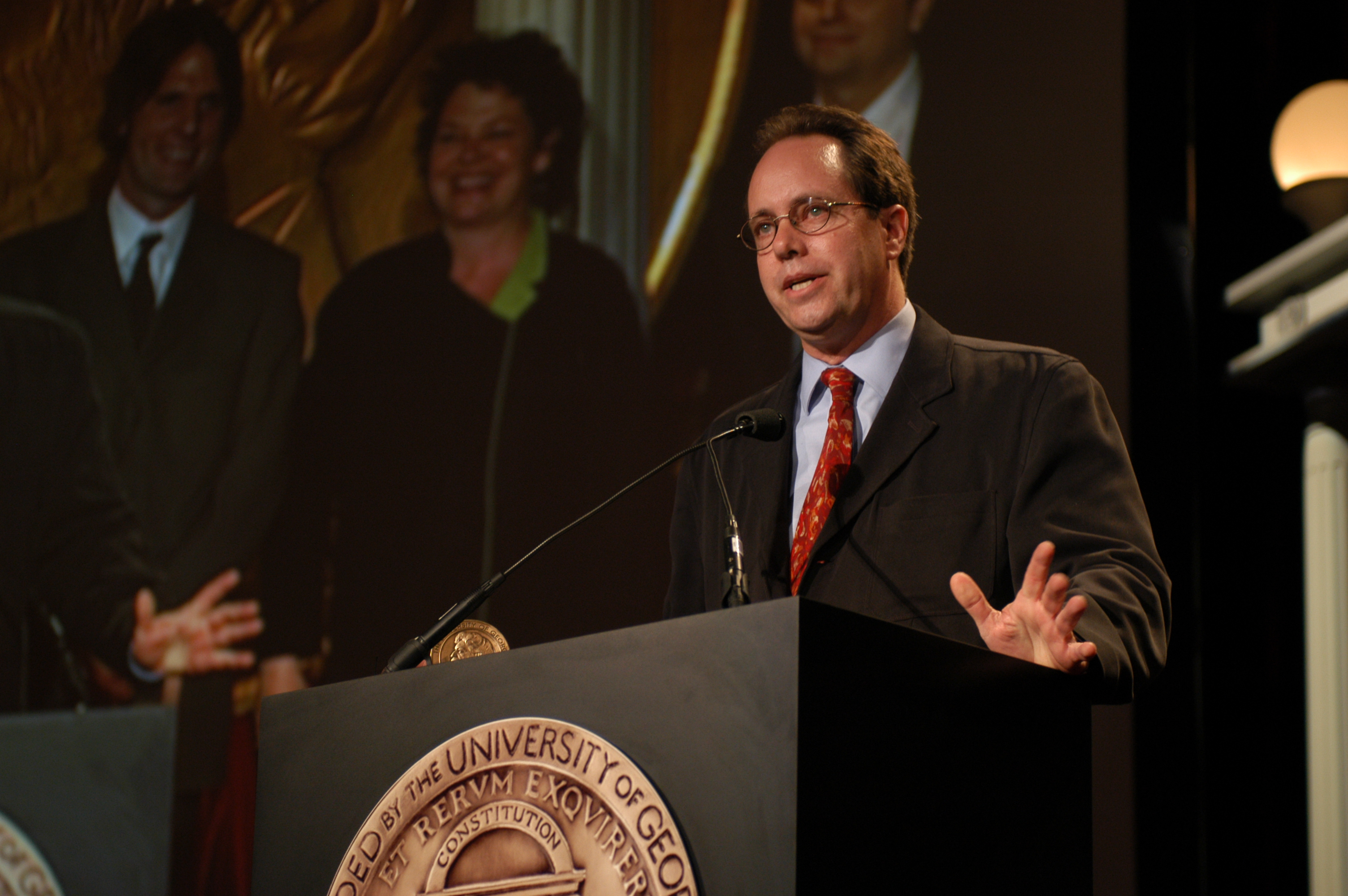
- Jay Allison at the 2004 Peabody Awards
- Education: Trinity College (Connecticut)
- Occupations: Journalist, Public Radio Producer
- Spouse: Melissa Allison
- Writing career
- Notable works: The Moth Radio Hour, This I Believe
- Notable awards: Peabody Award; Edward R. Murrow Award (Corporation for Public Broadcasting)
- Website: jayallison.com

Jay Allison is an American public radio producer and broadcast journalist. He is the executive director of Atlantic Public Media (APM). Through APM, he created platforms for independent audio producers, including Public Radio Exchange (PRX) and the educational website Transom.org. Through APM, he also founded the public radio stations WNAN and WCAI, serving the Cape Cod region of Massachusetts.

Allison is the producer of The Moth Radio Hour. He also produces many audio documentaries and series that appear within other radio programs. These include Lost and Found Sound, The Miles Davis Radio Project, and a revival of the 1950s-era program This I Believe. Allison has earned numerous awards for his work, including the Peabody Award and the Edward R. Murrow Award for outstanding contributions to public radio.

== Education ==
Allison received a B.A. in English from Trinity College in Hartford, Connecticut, in 1973. After graduation, he studied children’s theater in Eastern and Western Europe on a Thomas J. Watson Fellowship.

== Career ==
Allison started his career in theater as an actor. He began producing for radio in 1977 after a friend who worked at NPR loaned him a tape recorder. He taught himself to record, edit, and mix audio. He became known early on for integrating dramatic, theatrical sound design into stories. Over the years, he co-produced many audio documentaries and features, including "Beyond Affliction: The Disability History Project" (1999) and "Lost and Found Sound" (1999-2001). Many of these stories appeared within other radio programs.

In 1991, Allison was a co-producer for "The Miles Davis Radio Project," a multi-part audio series timed with the writing of Miles Davis's autobiography. The other producers were music documentarian Steve Rowland and poet Quincy Troupe, who co-wrote Davis's autobiography. The series incorporated original and archived interviews with Davis alongside new, previously unreleased interviews. The series also put forward studio outtakes and rare recordings, including Davis's never-before-heard first recording with John Coltrane. Actor Danny Glover hosted the series. The project won a Peabody Award, and was viewed at the time as Davis's definitive audio biography.

In 1993, Allison founded the non-profit Atlantic Public Media (originally named Cape and Islands Community Radio) in Woods Hole, Massachusetts, where he lived. His goal was to establish a public radio station serving Cape Cod, Martha's Vineyard and Nantucket. The region had been designated as "underserved" by the Corporation for Public Broadcasting. In 1997, APM got licenses from the Federal Communications Commission (FCC) to build two radio stations, one in Nantucket and one in Woods Hole. APM later formed a partnership with the Boston public radio station WGBH, through which WGBH built and operated the stations. In 2000, the radio stations WNAN, serving Nantucket, and WCAI, serving Martha's Vineyard and Cape Cod, went live.

On WNAN and WCAI, Allison aired nationally syndicated radio shows, like All Things Considered, and also created local programming. Allison's goal was to both capture local character and counter local rivalries, by highlighting human stories. He created a series of short radio spots, called "sonic IDs," which were created by local people and interspersed with programming. These short 30- or 60-second spots featured local people sharing anecdotes or oral histories. Some of the topics covered included the proper way to hang laundry on a line, the benefits of boat-building, or a memory of local store that since closed. As of 2012, the stations had hundreds of these spots in rotation.

In 2001, Allison launched Transom.org, a community website where new producers can take online classes, share their work and receive feedback. In 2003, Allison received the Peabody Award for Transom.org. It was the first free-standing website to receive the award.

In 2003, Allison launched Public Radio Exchange (PRX), a digital marketplace where content from independent producers can be discovered and purchased by radio stations across the U.S. His goal was to create more opportunity for new producers, and for different kinds of content that didn't fit into existing programs.

In 2005, Allison and his collaborator Dan Gediman revived Edward R. Murrow's 1950s radio program,This I Believe. The series collected short audio essays, told in the first-person, in which people express a deeply held belief. The series premiered as a segment within the NPR shows All Things Considered and Morning Edition in 2005.

== Awards ==
Allison has received six Peabody Awards. In 1985, Allison received the Peabody Award for the 3-part radio series on mental illness, "Breakdown and Back." In 1991, Allison received the Peabody Award for the radio biography, "The Miles Davis Radio Project." In 1999, Allison received the Peabody Award for the series "Lost & Found Sound," which appeared on the program All Things Considered. In 2002, Allison received the Peabody Award for the Sonic Memorial Project and the corresponding website, both serving as audio commemorations for the events of September 11, 2001. In 2003, Allison received the Peabody Award for the website Transom.org, the first free-standing website to receive the award. In 2010, Allison received the Peabody Award for the podcast The Moth Radio Hour.

Allison was the 1996 recipient of the CPB's Edward R. Murrow Award for outstanding contributions to public radio, the first independent producer to have received it.

In 2006, Allison received the duPont-Columbia Award for the radio series Hidden Kitchens, created with the Kitchen Sisters.
