= List of airports in New Hampshire =

This is a list of airports in New Hampshire, United States, grouped by type and sorted by location. It contains all public-use and military airports in the state. Some private-use and former airports may be included where notable, such as airports that were previously public-use, those with commercial enplanements recorded by the FAA or airports assigned an IATA airport code.

== Airports ==
This list contains the following information:

- **City served** – The city generally associated with the airport, as per the airport's master record with the Federal Aviation Administration. This is not always the actual location since some airports are located in smaller towns outside of the city they serve. It is not meant to be a complete list of cities served, which can be found in or added to each airport's Wikipedia article.
- **FAA** – The location identifier assigned by the Federal Aviation Administration (FAA). These are linked to each airport's page at the New Hampshire Department of Transportation (NHDOT) Bureau of Aeronautics.
- **IATA** – The airport code assigned by the International Air Transport Association (IATA). Those that do not match the FAA code are shown in bold.
- **ICAO** – The location indicator assigned by the International Civil Aviation Organization (ICAO).
- **Airport name** – The official airport name. Those shown in **bold** indicate the airport has scheduled passenger service on commercial airlines.
- **Role** – One of four FAA airport categories, as per the 20121–2025 National Plan of Integrated Airport Systems (NPIAS) report released September 2020:
  - P-s: Commercial service – primary are publicly owned airports that receive scheduled passenger service and have more than 10,000 passenger boardings (enplanements) each year. Each primary airport is sub-classified by the FAA as one of the following four "hub" types (s):
    - L: Large hub that accounts for at least 1% of total U.S. passenger enplanements.
    - M: Medium hub that accounts for between 0.25% and 1% of total U.S. passenger enplanements.
    - S: Small hub that accounts for between 0.05% and 0.25% of total U.S. passenger enplanements.
    - N: Nonhub that accounts for less than 0.05% of total U.S. passenger enplanements, but more than 10,000 annual enplanements.
  - CS: Commercial service – nonprimary are publicly owned airports that receive scheduled passenger service and have at least 2,500 passenger boardings each year.
  - R: Reliever airports are designated by the FAA to relieve congestion at a large commercial service airport and to provide more general aviation access to the overall community.
  - GA: General aviation airports are the largest single group of airports in the U.S. airport system. They are public-use airports that do not have scheduled service or have scheduled service with less than 2,500 passenger boardings each year.
- **Enplanements** – The number of enplanements (commercial passenger boardings) that occurred at the airport in calendar year 2024, as per FAA records released October 2025.

City served	FAA	IATA	ICAO	Airport name	Role	Enplanements (2024)
				**Commercial service – primary airports**		
Manchester	MHT	MHT	KMHT	**Manchester–Boston Regional Airport**	P-S	633,257
Portsmouth	PSM	PSM	KPSM	**Portsmouth International Airport at Pease**	P-N	100,298
				**Commercial service – nonprimary airports**		
Lebanon	LEB	LEB	KLEB	**Lebanon Municipal Airport**	CS	10,934
				**Reliever airports**		
Nashua	ASH	ASH	KASH	Boire Field	R	10
				**General aviation airports**		
Berlin	BML	BML	KBML	Berlin Regional Airport (was Berlin Municipal)	GA	15
Claremont	CNH	CNH	KCNH	Claremont Municipal Airport	GA	2
Concord	CON	CON	KCON	Concord Municipal Airport	GA	59
Haverhill	5B9			Dean Memorial Airport	GA	0
Jaffrey	AFN	AFN	KAFN	Jaffrey/Silver Ranch Airport	GA	0
Keene	EEN	EEN	KEEN	Dillant–Hopkins Airport	GA	50
Laconia	LCI	LCI	KLCI	Laconia Municipal Airport	GA	361
Newport	2B3	NWH		Parlin Field	GA	2
Plymouth	1P1			Plymouth Municipal Airport	GA	0
Rochester	DAW		KDAW	Skyhaven Airport	GA	9
Whitefield	HIE	HIE	KHIE	Mount Washington Regional Airport	GA	4
				**Other public-use airports** (not listed in NPIAS)		
Alton Bay	B18			Alton Bay Seaplane Base		
Bristol	2N2			Newfound Valley Airport		
Colebrook	4C4			Gifford Field		
Deering	8B1			Hawthorne–Feather Airpark		
Errol	ERR	ERR	KERR	Errol Airport		
Franconia	1B5			Franconia Airport		
Gorham	2G8			Gorham Airport		
Hampton	7B3			Hampton Airfield		
Moultonborough	4MB			Moultonboro Airport		
Twin Mountain	8B2			Twin Mountain Airport		
				**Notable private-use airports**		
Hampton	NH35			Fisher Scientific Heliport		
Loudon	NH59			Speedway Heliport		
Pembroke	NH33			Brigham Heliport		
Wolfeboro	NH31			Mountain View Field		
				**Notable former airports**		
North Conway	~~CWN~~			White Mountain Airport (1930–1988)		

== See also ==
- Essential Air Service
- New Hampshire World War II Army Airfields
- Wikipedia:WikiProject Aviation/Airline destination lists: North America#New Hampshire
