= Plymouth Municipal Airport =

Plymouth Municipal Airport may refer to:

- Plymouth Municipal Airport (Indiana) in Plymouth, Indiana, United States (FAA: C65)
- Plymouth Municipal Airport (Massachusetts) in Plymouth, Massachusetts, United States (FAA: PYM)
- Plymouth Municipal Airport (New Hampshire) in Plymouth, New Hampshire, United States (FAA: 1P1)
- Plymouth Municipal Airport (North Carolina) in Plymouth, North Carolina, United States (FAA: PMZ)
