= Lake Armington =

Lake in Grafton County, New Hampshire

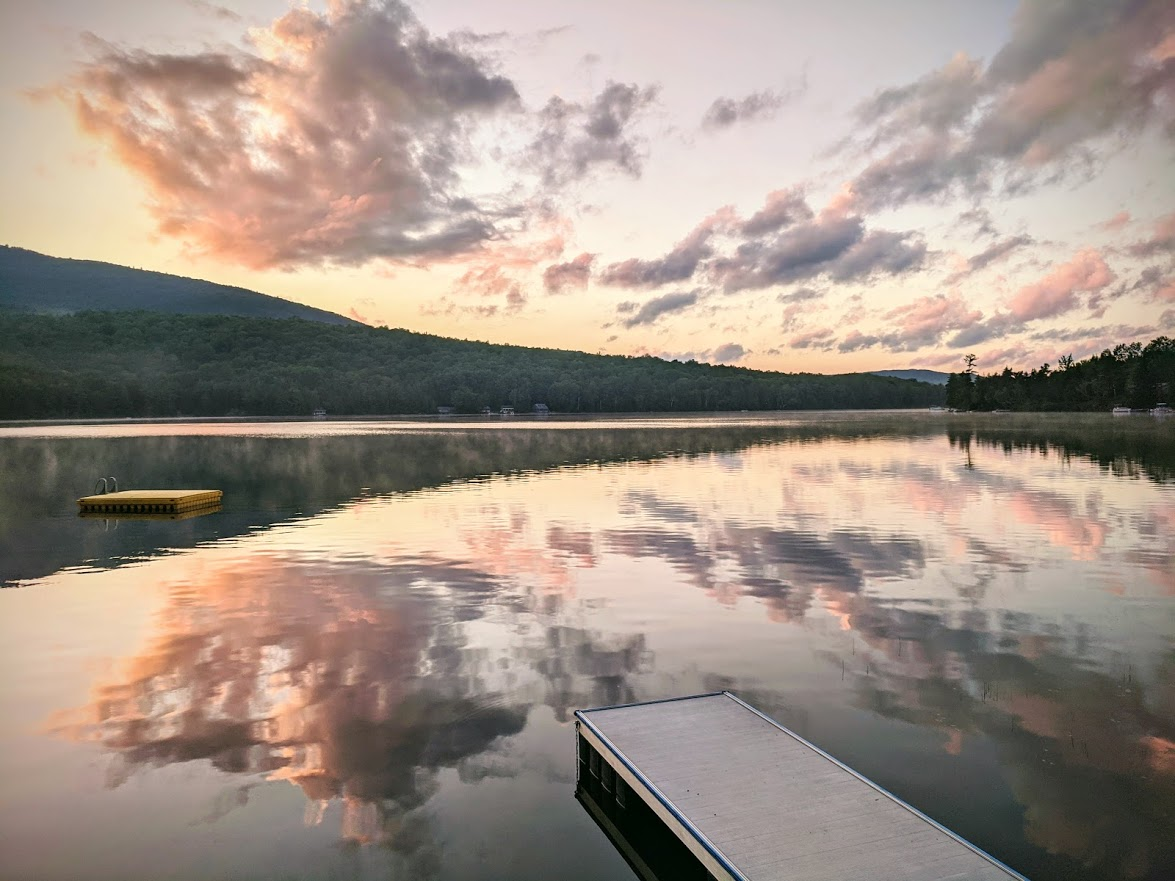

- Location within New Hampshire Location within the United States
- Location: Grafton County, New Hampshire
- Coordinates: 43°57′31″N 71°58′08″W
- Basin countries: United States
- Max. length: 1.3 mi (2.1 km)
- Max. width: 0.3 mi (0.48 km)
- Surface area: 152 acres (0.62 km^{2})
- Average depth: 10 ft (3.0 m)
- Max. depth: 30 ft (9.1 m)
- Surface elevation: 1,350 ft (410 m)
- Settlements: Piermont

Lake Armington is a 152-acre (0.62 km^{2}) water body in the town of Piermont, in Grafton County, on the western edge of the White Mountains in New Hampshire, United States. Water from Lake Armington flows north for 0.2 miles (0.32 km) into Lake Tarleton, and then continues west via Eastman Brook to reach the Connecticut River.

Camp Walt Whitman is located at the south end of the lake. The Appalachian Trail passes over Ore Hill, located about one mile east of the lake.

The lake is classified as a warmwater fishery, with observed species including rainbow trout, brown trout, smallmouth bass, chain pickerel, and horned pout. Boat access to the lake is available at the northeast end, off New Hampshire Route 25C.

== See also ==
- List of lakes in New Hampshire
