= Hawthorne–Feather Airpark =

- IATA: none; ICAO: none; FAA LID: 8B1

Summary
- Airport type: Public
- Owner: James T. Rymes
- Serves: Hillsborough, New Hampshire
- Elevation AMSL: 600 ft (180 m)
- Coordinates: 43°03′41″N 071°54′19″W
- Website: Official website

Map
- Interactive map of Hawthorne–Feather Airpark

Runways
Direction	Length		Surface
Direction	ft	m	Surface
2/20	3,260	994	Asphalt

Statistics (2014)
- Aircraft operations: 3,600
- Based aircraft: 10
- Source: Federal Aviation Administration

Hawthorne–Feather Airpark (FAA LID: 8B1) is a privately owned public-use airport located three nautical miles (6 km) south of the central business district of Hillsborough, in Hillsborough County, New Hampshire, United States. The airport is situated in Deering, New Hampshire. It was formerly used by Hawthorne College in Antrim, New Hampshire to train student pilots.

== Facilities and aircraft ==
Hawthorne–Feather Airpark covers an area of 50 acres (20 ha) at an elevation of 600 feet (183 m) above mean sea level. It has one runway designated 2/20 with an asphalt surface measuring 3,260 by 75 feet (994 x 23 m).

For the 12-month period ending 7 August 2014, the airport had 3,000 general aviation and 600 military aircraft operations, an average of 300 per month. At that time there were 10 aircraft based at this airport: 90% single-engine and 10% ultralight.

The airport provides Avgas and outhouses. Radio frequencies are 122.800 Mhz. The airport is open all year long (in the winter, depending on conditions and snow conditions, skis may be used alongside the paved runway). Located on the east side of the runway is a large hangar that holds multiple planes, but space to rent is limited. Weather service is held at Jaffrey Airport – Silver Ranch Airpark.

== See also ==
- List of airports in New Hampshire
