= B18 =

B18 or B-18 may refer to:

- Alton Bay Seaplane Base (FAA LID: B18)
- B-18 Bolo, an American bomber aircraft by Douglas based on the Douglas DC-2
- B 18, a Swedish bomber aircraft made by SAAB
- B18 (New York City bus) serving Brooklyn
- B18 road (Cyprus)
- Caro–Kann Defence, in chess (Encyclopaedia of Chess Openings code B18)
- HLA-B18, an HLA-B serotype
- Honda B engine
- Volvo B18 engine
- Boron-18 (B-18 or ^{18}B), an isotope of boron
- LNER Class B18, classified B1 until 1943
- 18th Street gang (Barrio 18)
