= Piermont, New Hampshire =

- Town
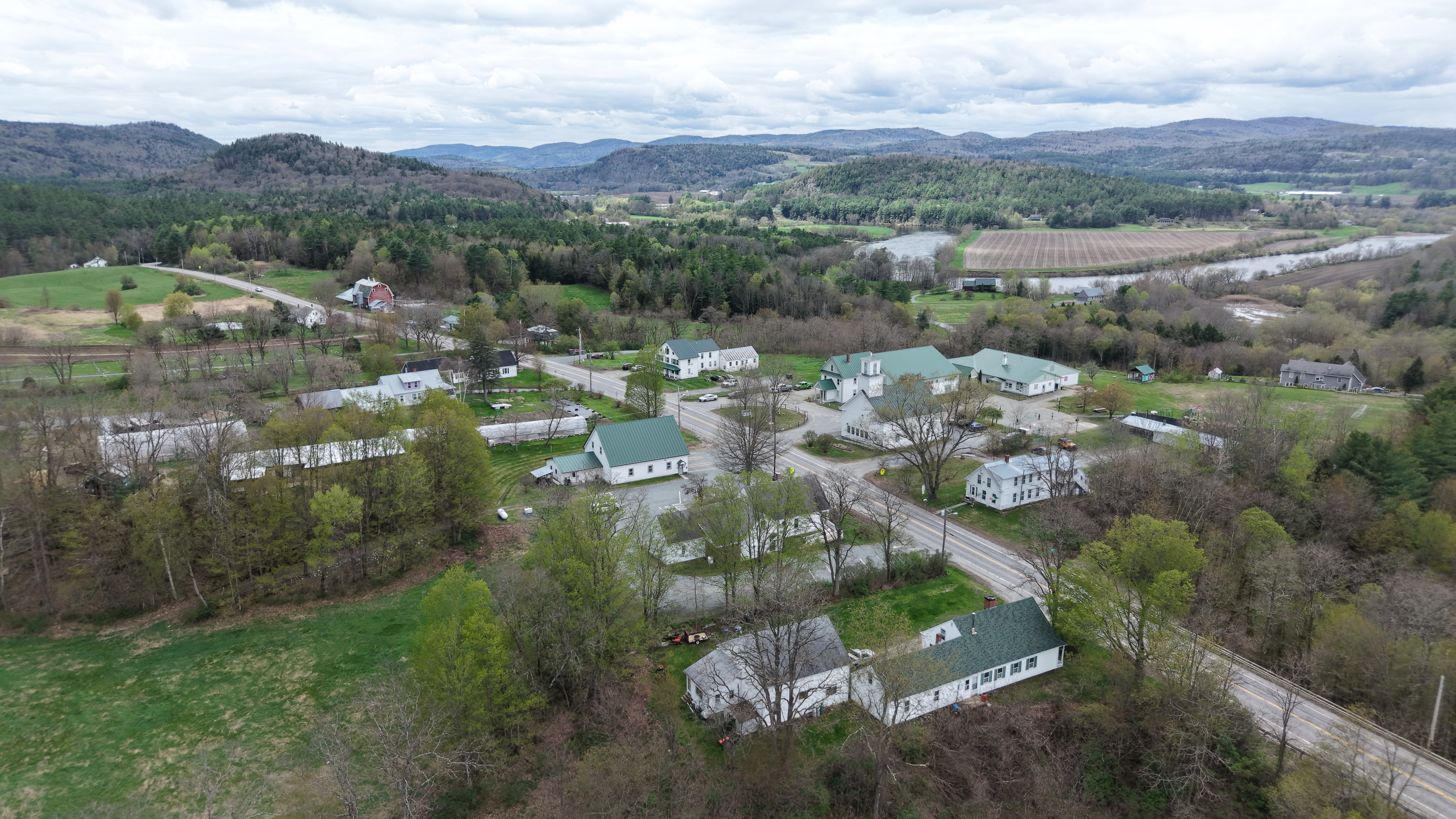
- Piermont, New Hampshire, from the northeast

- Seal

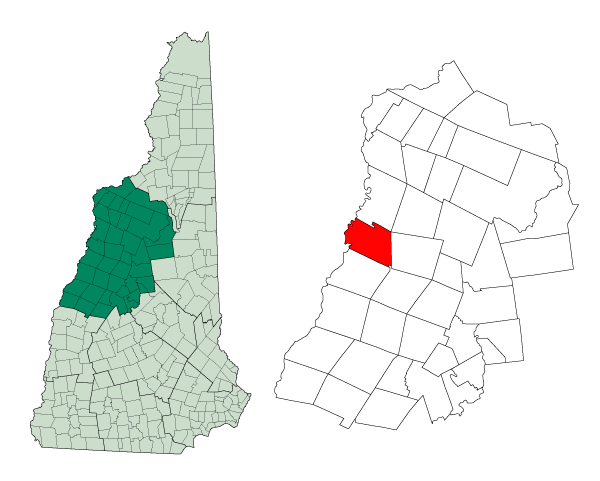
- Location in Grafton County, New Hampshire
- Coordinates: 43°58′29″N 72°01′51″W
- Country: United States
- State: New Hampshire
- County: Grafton
- Incorporated: 1764

Area
  - Total: 39.8 sq mi (103.2 km^{2})
  - Land: 38.5 sq mi (99.6 km^{2})
  - Water: 1.4 sq mi (3.6 km^{2}) 3.49%
- Elevation: 948 ft (289 m)

Population (2020)
  - Total: 769
  - Density: 20/sq mi (7.7/km^{2})
- Time zone: UTC-5 (Eastern)
  - Summer (DST): UTC-4 (Eastern)
- ZIP code: 03779
- Area code: 603
- FIPS code: 33-61060
- GNIS feature ID: 873698
- Website: townofpiermontnh.org

Piermont is a town in Grafton County, New Hampshire, United States. The population was 769 at the 2020 census. It is home to Camp Walt Whitman and Kingswood Camp for Boys.

== History ==
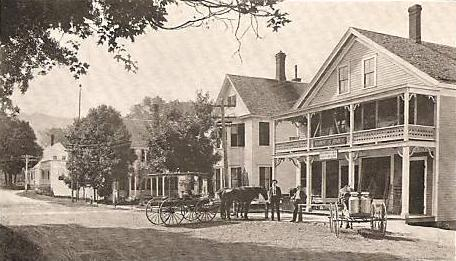
Town center in 1913

Incorporated by Governor Benning Wentworth in 1764 and settled in 1768, the town takes its name from Italy's Piedmont. It had 426 residents in 1790, the year of the first census.

Aaron Lane, who grew up in Piermont, was the first permanent settler in the Mojave Desert area now known as Victorville, California. A biography of Lane sheds light on life in Piermont during the mid-19th century.

== Geography ==
According to the United States Census Bureau, the town has a total area of 39.8 square miles (103.2 km^{2}), of which 38.5 square miles (99.6 km^{2}) are land and 1.4 square miles (3.6 km^{2}) are water, comprising 3.49% of the town. It is drained by Indian Pond Brook, Eastman Brook and Bean Brook, tributaries of the Connecticut River, which forms the western boundary. The southeastern corner of the town drains south to Upper Baker Pond in Orford, part of the Merrimack River watershed. Piermont's highest point is the summit of Piermont Mountain, at 2,717 feet (828 m) above sea level. The town is home to Lake Tarleton, which takes its name from its erstwhile owner, Colonel William Tarleton, who was a delegate to the Constitutional Convention of 1791. Lake Armington feeds Lake Tarleton from the south.

Piermont is bordered by the New Hampshire towns of Haverhill to the north, Warren to the east, Wentworth to the southeast, and Orford to the south. Bradford, Vermont, is across the Connecticut River to the west. Piermont is 27 miles (43 km) north of Lebanon and 33 miles (53 km) southwest of Littleton.

== Transportation ==
=== Road ===
Piermont is crossed by New Hampshire state routes NH-10, NH-25 and NH-25C. Interstate 91 is accessible via neighboring Bradford, Vermont.

=== Air ===
Dean Memorial Airport in neighboring Haverhill is the closest airport. The closest commercial airport is Lebanon Municipal Airport in Lebanon. The closest international airport is Burlington International Airport in South Burlington, Vermont.

=== Rail ===
The closest Amtrak station is 30 miles (48 km) to the south in White River Junction, Vermont, providing service via the Vermonter line.

== Demographics ==
Historical population
Census	Pop.	Note	%±
1790	426		—
1800	670		57.3%
1810	877		30.9%
1820	1,016		15.8%
1830	1,042		2.6%
1840	1,057		1.4%
1850	948		−10.3%
1860	949		0.1%
1870	792		−16.5%
1880	752		−5.1%
1890	709		−5.7%
1900	637		−10.2%
1910	592		−7.1%
1920	577		−2.5%
1930	475		−17.7%
1940	535		12.6%
1950	511		−4.5%
1960	477		−6.7%
1970	462		−3.1%
1980	507		9.7%
1990	624		23.1%
2000	709		13.6%
2010	790		11.4%
2020	769		−2.7%
U.S. Decennial Census

As of the census of 2010, there were 790 people, 334 households, and 228 families residing in the town. The population density was 19.8 people per square mile (7.6/km^{2}). There were 474 housing units at an average density of 11.9 per square mile (4.6/km^{2}). The racial makeup of the town was 97.2% White, 0.1% African American, 0.9% Asian, 0.4% Native American and Alaskan Native, and 1.4% from two or more races. Hispanic or Latino of any race were 0.8% of the population.

There were 334 households in Piermont, out of which 24.6% had children under the age of 18 living with them, 57.8% were married couples living together, 7.5% had a female householder with no husband present, and 31.7% were non-families. 24.6% of all households were made up of individuals, and 9.6% had someone living alone who was 65 years of age or older. The average household size was 2.37, and the average family size was 2.83.

In the town, the population was spread out, with 19.0% under the age of 18, 5.1% between the ages of 18 and 24, 22.8% between 25 and 44, 36.3% between 45 and 64, and 16.8% who were 65 years of age or older. The median age was 46.8 years. The town was 49.4% male and 50.6% female.

For the period 2010–2014, the estimated median income for a household in the town was $72,841, and the median income for a family was $91,875. Male full-time workers had a median income of $49,688 versus $41,250 for females. The per capita income for the town was $38,089. About 3.4% of families and 6.8% of the total population were below the poverty line, including 6.3% of those under age 18 and 6.0% of those age 65 or over.

== Education ==
=== K–12 ===
Piermont operates grades K–8 through the Piermont Village School. Piermont has no high schools in the town, and grades 9–12 are tuitioned to a number of area high schools. Students may also attend the technical schools Hartford Career & Technology Center in White River Junction, Vermont, and River Bend Career and Technical Center in Bradford, Vermont. Students may also choose to attend St. Johnsbury Academy in St. Johnsbury, VT.

=== Higher education ===
The closest four-year public institution is Plymouth State University in Plymouth, New Hampshire. The closest four-year private institution is Dartmouth College in Hanover. The closest two-year community colleges are River Valley Community College in Claremont and Lakes Region Community College in Laconia.

== Sites of interest ==
- Lake Tarleton State Park
- Camp Walt Whitman
- Kingswood Camp for Boys

== Notable people ==
- John Elkins (1815–1898), businessman, Wisconsin State Representative
- Ira Hobart Evans (1844–1922), philanthropist, military officer; recipient of the Medal of Honor
