= Settlers Green =

Outlet shopping center in North Conway, New Hampshire, United States

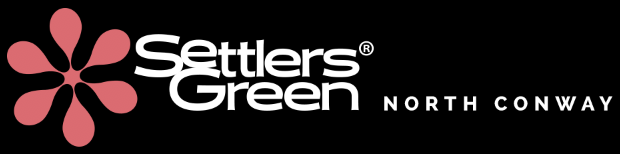

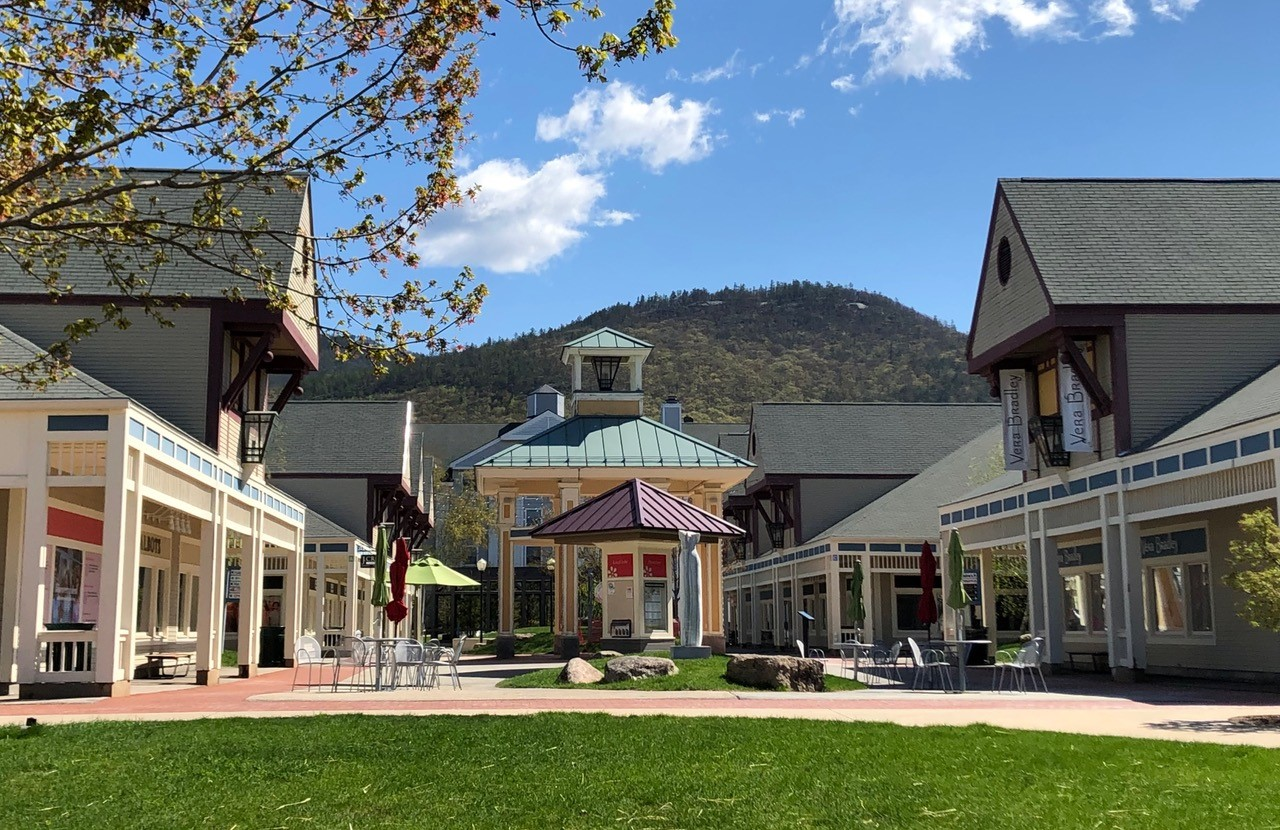
- Location: North Conway, New Hampshire, United States
- Coordinates: 44.024699°N 71.109781°W
- Address: Route 16
- Opened: February 1988
- Manager: OVP Management, Inc.
- Num. of stores: 60
- Num. of anchor tenants: 4
- Floor area: 500,000 sq ft (46,000 m^{2})
- Floors: 1
- Website: settlersgreen.com

Settlers Green (formerly Settlers' Green) is an outlet shopping center in North Conway, New Hampshire, United States. The center was built on the location of the former White Mountain Airport and opened in February 1988. It has since expanded to a former industrial site and a former competing shopping center. Settlers Green is divided into four parts: the Outlet Village, which contains mostly outlet stores; Settlers Crossing, which has a combination of lifestyle and specialty retailers; Settlers Corner, which houses a Staples, Home Depot, and HomeGoods; and Streetside, which features upscale retailers. With over 500,000 square feet (46,000 m^{2}) of retail space, it is the largest shopping center in the White Mountains Region.

== History ==
Settlers Green was developed on the site of the former White Mountain Airport, which was purchased in 1985 from Wylie Apte, Jr. The outlet village began with a 30-store retail square, built at a cost of $8 million and 75 percent leased by November 1988. It was the first outlet-oriented shopping center in the state.

Settlers Green competed with the nearby Mountain Valley Mall, an enclosed shopping center built in 1980 and originally anchored by Kmart, J. C. Penney, and Shop 'N' Save. The mall was partially demolished in 2011 to make space for a Lowe's. GNC and Waldenbooks, which were tenants in the mall, moved to Settlers Crossing.

In 2014, OVP Management Inc. acquired an adjacent shopping center, where L.L.Bean had opened its first factory outlet store in 1988 and which had been virtually vacant since L.L.Bean moved that store to Settlers Crossing in the early 2010s. OVP Management paid $1.4 million to acquire the shopping center, which was demolished to build Settlers Green Streetside.

In early 2017, Settlers Green sought proposals for permanent art installations in conjunction with the New Hampshire State Council on the Arts. Several sculptures and murals were commissioned for the new Settlers Green Streetside development.

== Stores ==
Tenants in the center's early years included Banana Republic, Eddie Bauer, and Brookstone, whose first US outlet store opened at Settlers Green in May 1990. Other retailers with outlet stores at Settlers Green include J. Crew Factory Store, Nike Factory Store, Coach and G.H. Bass Outlet.

Staples and The Home Depot anchor Settlers Corner, while Eastern Mountain Sports anchors Settlers Crossing. Settlers Green doesn't have anchor tenants, although the 200-room North Conway Grand Hotel serves as a focal point for much of the development.

A number of non-outlet stores have also opened at Settlers Green, particularly at Settlers Crossing. These include Walgreens, Books-A-Million, GNC, Circle K, Market Basket, and Mattress Firm.
