= Manchester–Boston Regional Airport =

Public airport in Manchester and Londonderry, New Hampshire, United States

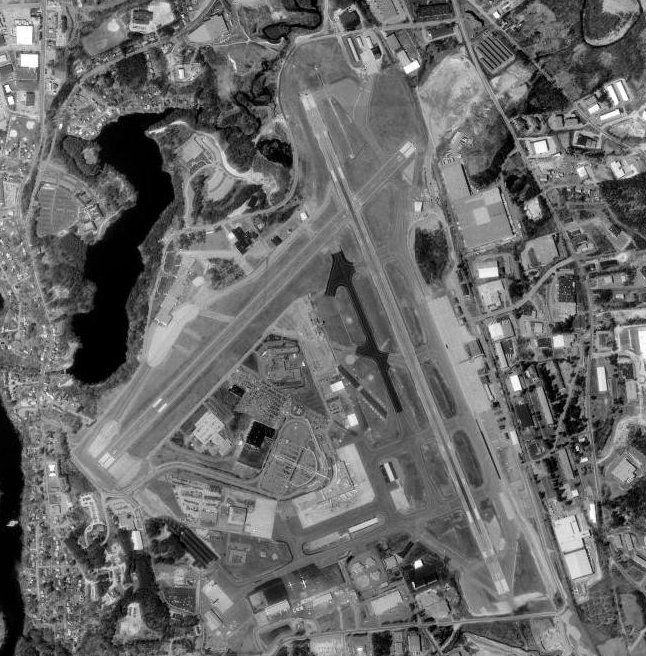
- Aerial photo taken April 11, 1998
- IATA: MHT; ICAO: KMHT; FAA LID: MHT

Summary
- Airport type: Public
- Owner: City of Manchester
- Serves: State of New Hampshire, Northern Greater Boston
- Location: Manchester and Londonderry, New Hampshire, U.S.
- Hub for: Wiggins Airways; Ameriflight
- Elevation AMSL: 266 ft (81 m)
- Coordinates: 42°55′57″N 071°26′08″W
- Website: www.flymanchester.com

Maps
- FAA airport diagram
- Interactive map of Manchester–Boston Regional Airport

Runways
Direction	Length		Surface
Direction	ft	m	Surface
17/35	9,250	2,819	Asphalt
6/24	7,651	2,332	Asphalt

Statistics (2025)
- Aircraft operations (2024): 43,127
- Total passengers served: 1,381,518
- Cargo handled: 238,580,017 lbs.
- Source: Federal Aviation Administration

Manchester–Boston Regional Airport (IATA: MHT, ICAO: KMHT, FAA LID: MHT), informally referred to by its former name Manchester Airport, is a public use airport 3 miles (5 km) south of the central business district of Manchester, New Hampshire, United States on the border of Hillsborough and Rockingham counties. It is owned by the city of Manchester, and is in the southern part of the city, on the border with Londonderry, New Hampshire, extending into that town.

Opened in 1927, Manchester–Boston Regional Airport is by far the busiest airport in New Hampshire, with ten times the traffic of the next-busiest, Portsmouth. It is the only airport in the state with substantial commercial service. It is also New England's sixth-largest airport by passenger volume, behind Logan in Massachusetts; Bradley in Connecticut; Rhode Island T. F. Green in Rhode Island; Portland in Maine; and Patrick Leahy Burlington in Vermont. It moved more than 1 million passengers in a year for the first time in 1997. After years of growth, it handled 4.33 million passengers in 2005, its peak year. Passenger tallies have declined since then, similarly with many regional airports; it handled 1.85 million passengers in 2018, and traffic fell sharply during the COVID-19 pandemic.

It is included in the Federal Aviation Administration (FAA) National Plan of Integrated Airport Systems for 2021–2025, in which it is categorized as a small hub primary commercial service facility. The facility was known as Manchester Airport until April 18, 2006, when it added "Boston Regional" to advertise its proximity to Boston, about 50 miles (80 km) to the south. The airport has a Cat III B Instrument Landing System. It is home to the Aviation Museum of New Hampshire, built around an Art Deco control tower, and its terminal opened in 1938.

== Use ==
Manchester–Boston is New England's third-largest cargo airport behind Connecticut's Bradley International, which is a hub for UPS Airlines, and Logan in Boston. FedEx, UPS and Amazon all serve Manchester with cargo-specific jets, including the Airbus A300, Boeing 757, Boeing 767 and Boeing 737.

UPS uses Manchester to "feed" the rest of northern New England by contracting with Wiggins Airways, which flies smaller prop-driven planes to places like Portland, Augusta, Bangor, Presque Isle, Rutland, and other communities. To handle this "regional sort," UPS built a sorting facility where packages coming in from the company's Louisville hub are redistributed to trucks or to the Wiggins feeder aircraft.

FedEx previously used Manchester as a regional sorting station as well but now supports the northern New England destinations via direct flights from Memphis, Tennessee, to Portland and Burlington. A contract with the Postal Service fills the FedEx jets (coming from hubs in Memphis and Indianapolis) with mail in addition to the typical assortment of express and overnight packages. DHL previously operated a 727-200 on a Wilmington, Ohio-Allentown, Pennsylvania-Manchester-Wilmington routing, but that service has since ceased.

In November 2022, Amazon Air began flying into Manchester utilizing Boeing 767 and Boeing 737 aircraft operated by Atlas Air from Fort Worth Alliance Airport and Cincinnati/Northern Kentucky International Airport.

== Facility and operations ==
Manchester Boston Regional Airport covers an area of 1,500 acres (610 ha), which contains two asphalt runways: Runway 17/35 measuring 9,250 x 150 ft (2,819 x 46 m) and Runway 6/24 measuring 7,651 x 150 ft (2,332 x 46 m).

== History ==
The Manchester airport was founded in June 1927, when the city's Board of Mayor and Aldermen put $15,000 towards the project. By October, a board of aviation had been founded, and ground was broken at an 84-acre (34 ha) site near Pine Island Pond. It took only a month for two 1,800-foot (550 m) runways to be constructed. The board of aviation convinced George G. "Scotty" Wilson, a barnstormer operating out of Boston, to move to New Hampshire and start Manchester's first flying service. After the formation of Northeast Airways at the site in 1933, the first passenger terminal was built.

In 1940, as the U.S. entered World War II, the airport was chosen as an Army Air Force base. At its peak, some 6,000 troops were stationed there, including the 45th Bombardment Group – which practiced bombing runs on what is now New Boston Air Force Station – and an anti-submarine squadron that destroyed at least two Nazi subs off the U.S. Atlantic coast. It was renamed Grenier Field after Manchester native Lt. Jean B. Grenier, who died in a training mission in 1934. Civilian use returned in 1951 when Northeast Airways resumed flights.

The current Manchester airport began to take shape as a joint civil-military facility in the 1960s. A new civilian terminal and the first modern air traffic control tower in New Hampshire were constructed in 1961. Businessman Roscoe A. Ammon donated $500,000 for the construction of the new air terminal. In 1966, the Air Force removed its remaining forces and closed Grenier Air Force Base, leaving the airport open for expansion. In 1978 the airfield was renamed Manchester Airport.

Throughout the 1960s and 1970s, the airport was served by Northeast Airlines with the Convair CV-240, Douglas DC-9, and Fokker FH-227. Delta Air Lines absorbed Northeast in 1972 and continued to serve the airport with the DC-9 until 1978, then Boeing 727-200s until 1980 when it discontinued service at Manchester. Pilgrim Airlines provided service to Washington, New York-LaGuardia and Keene in the early 1980s.

In the mid-1980s, airlines once again started offering jet service out of Manchester. United Airlines inaugurated service at Manchester in 1983 with two daily flights to Chicago–O'Hare. This was part of their 50 States campaign, which positioned United as the only carrier to serve all 50 states with mainline service. The Boeing 727 and Boeing 737 were initially used on the Chicago flights, which would often make intermediate stops in cities like Providence, Albany, Syracuse, and Burlington to pick up or drop off passengers. Manchester was also a "tag-on" for United flights heading from Bangor and Portland, Maine, to Chicago, but the carrier no longer serves either city with mainline aircraft.

In the early 1990s, United Airlines began flights between Manchester and Dulles International Airport near Washington, D.C. But creation of a north–south hub at Dulles did not work for United, and heavy competition in this market led to a quick exit. The Boeing 737 was used for this short-lived service, which comprised about four daily circuits between the two airports. US Airways started service at Manchester in early 1986, by connecting their hubs at Pittsburgh and Philadelphia. The carrier used the DC-9, BAC 111, and 737-200 aircraft. Both carriers expanded service at Manchester over the years with larger planes and more flights. United now runs a strict non-stop schedule to and from Chicago with no intermediate stops or tag-ons. The 757 has been used by both United and US Airways at Manchester, which stands as the largest passenger-carrying plane to serve the airport in scheduled service. The Airbus A320 series of aircraft is also commonly used by United, Northwest Airlines (merged with Delta Air Lines), and occasionally by US Airways. In April 2010, Delta enhanced service to Manchester; it dropped its daily CRJ-700 service to Atlanta and replaced the aircraft with an MD-88 with seating for 149. Delta also switched all its Delta Connection service to Detroit with mainline service on DC-9's. On October 7, 2021, Spirit Airlines began serving Manchester with the Airbus A320, making it one of 3 airlines regularly serving Manchester with mainline aircraft. Southwest serves Manchester with the Boeing 737-700 and the Boeing 737-800. American flies the Airbus A319/20 from Charlotte.

=== Expansion ===
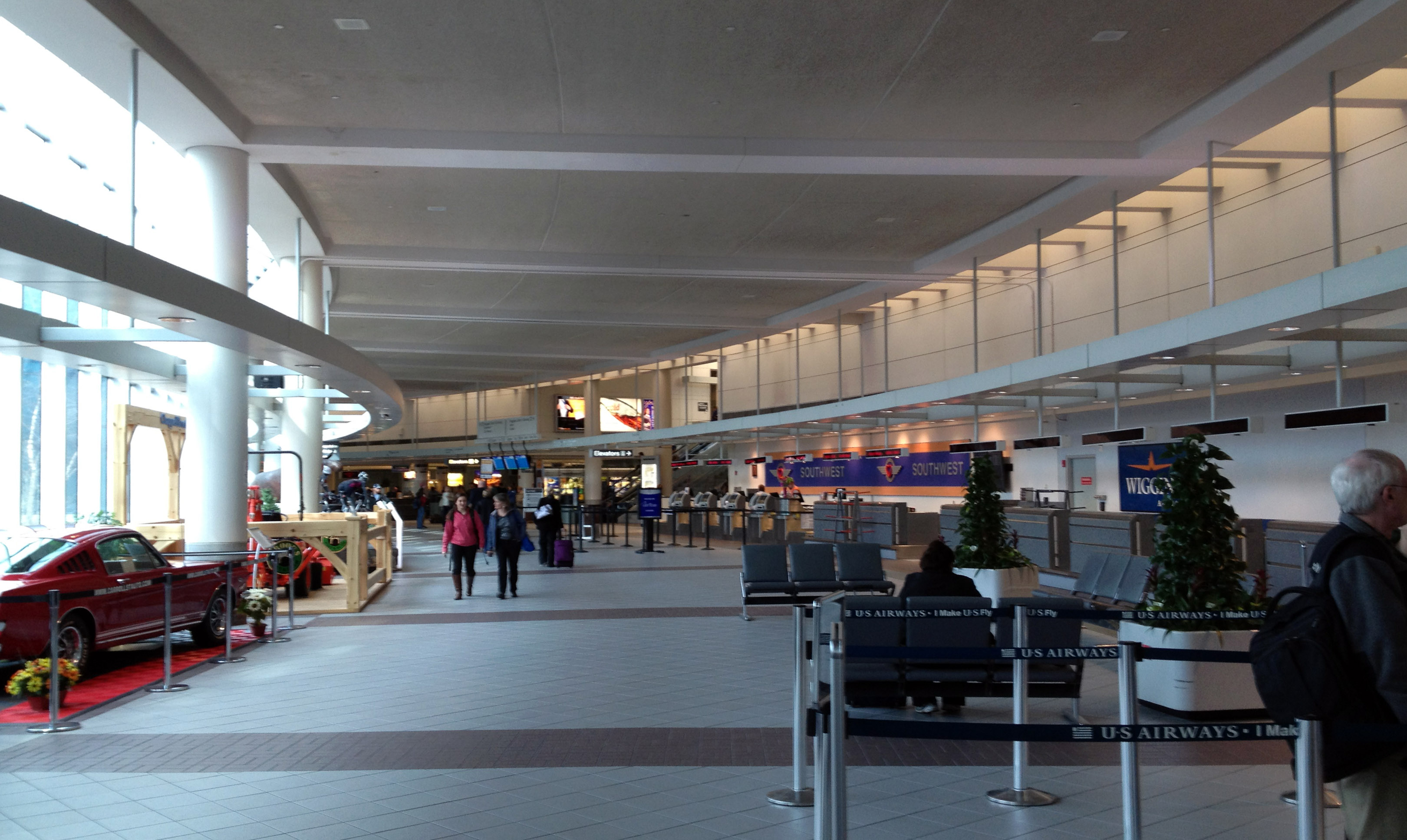
Terminal of Manchester-Boston Airport

In 1992, a long-term expansion and improvement plan started to take shape. Two years later, a new 158,000-square-foot (14,700 m^{2}) terminal designed by HNTB and Lavallee Brensinger opened, providing ample room for larger jets. The airport continued to expand, opening a new parking garage and parking lots in the next years, as well as working to reconstruct the runways and taxiways. In 1998, these expansions paid off, with MetroJet, Northwest, and Southwest all beginning service. The airport prospered from the "Southwest Effect", in which competing airlines increase service and decrease fares to compete with the low-cost carrier. Throughout the 1990s, Manchester outpaced almost every other similarly sized airport in terms of passenger growth. In 2003, Runway 17/35 was extended from 7,001 feet (2,134 m) to 9,250 feet (2,820 m), allowing non-stop service to Las Vegas.

In April 2006, the aldermen of the city of Manchester voted to change the name of the airport to "Manchester–Boston Regional Airport" in an effort to increase its visibility to travelers around the country.

=== Decline in passengers ===
In 2006 the airport started to experience a decrease in passengers flying through its facility, with service to only twelve cities. In 2017, the airport served the fewest passengers since 1998. United Airlines canceled its Chicago O'Hare service in July 2018, making Newark its only destination from Manchester, which was replaced by Washington Dulles in March 2019. In 2020 Delta consolidated its service to Boston. Southwest as of 2021 has diminished service to four cities, with Delta Air Lines serving Atlanta once daily instead of twice.

The decline in service is due to increased activity at Logan International Airport in Boston and to mergers between airlines, which led to decreased flights. When Southwest entered Logan in 2009, it also significantly reduced prices at Logan, prompting more people to fly out of Boston rather than Manchester.

=== Current service ===
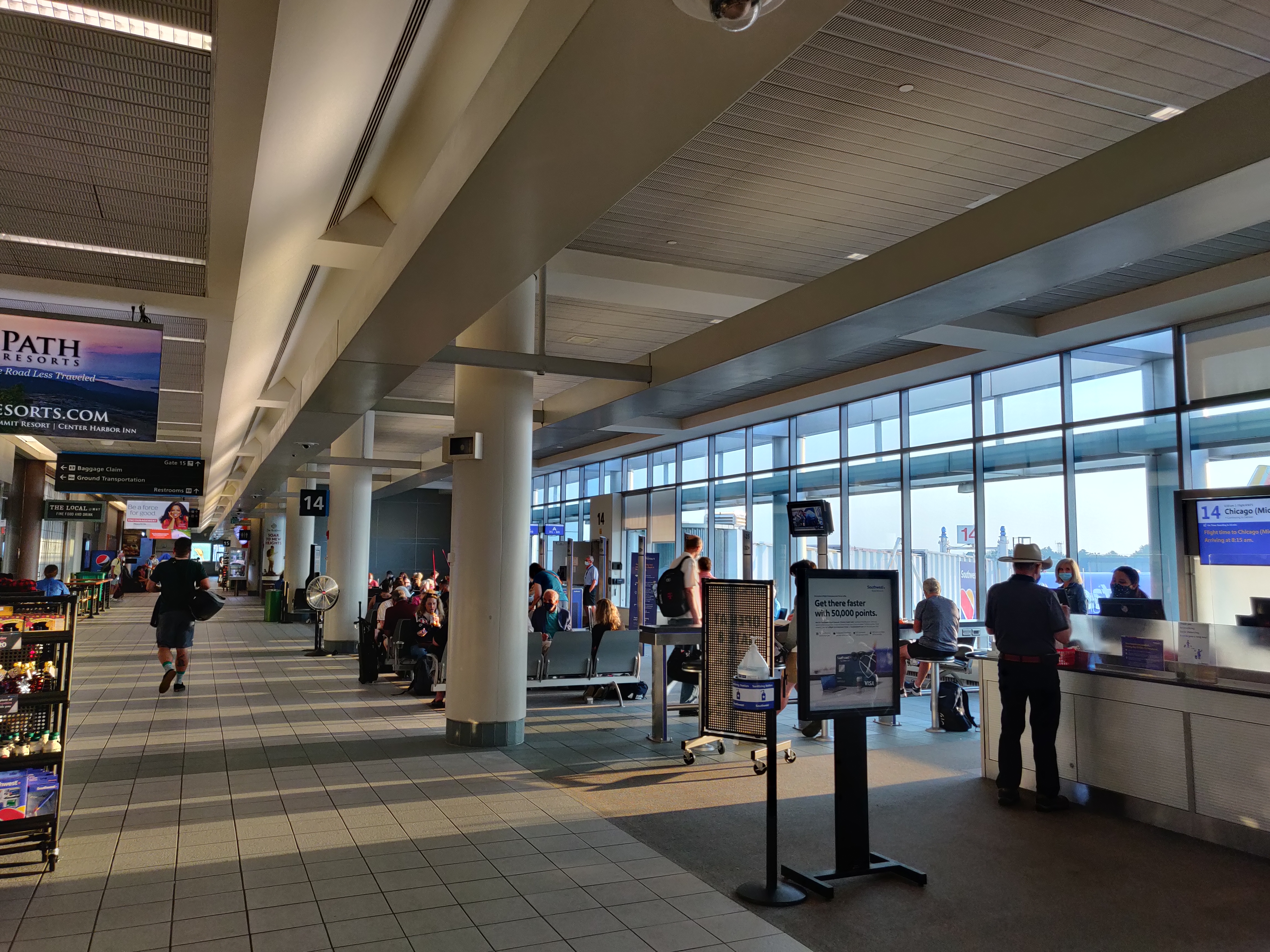
Departure gates

The airport administration hired a new airport director in 2018 to help it bring back passengers to Manchester, as well as to help bring in new airlines and destinations. Subsequent years have seen many changes in service at the airport.

In 2019, American Airlines announced service to Chicago O'Hare after United discontinued its O'Hare service. United announced service to Washington-Dulles instead of Newark in March 2019, but ended it on January 4, 2022.

In November 2020, Delta Air Lines announced that they would discontinue service to MHT.

On February 9, 2021, Aeroterm announced that it would develop a new cargo facility at the airport.

On June 16, 2021, Spirit Airlines announced it would be starting service to four Florida cities in October; it later announced that seasonal service to Myrtle Beach would start April 2022. Spirit was the first new airline to begin service at Manchester-Boston since Air Canada in 2004. However, in 2024 the airline discontinued all MHT service.

In November 2022, Amazon Air, operated by Atlas Air, began service from Cincinnati/Northern Kentucky International Airport using Boeing 767 aircraft; current operations now include a flight from Perot Field Fort Worth Alliance Airport, which then continues to Cincinnati/Northern Kentucky International Airport.

On March 15, 2023 Avelo Airlines announced nonstop service to Raleigh–Durham International Airport twice weekly, utilizing the Boeing 737-800. Later on February 15, 2024, Avelo Airlines announced a new route to Greenville/Spartanburg.

On February 20, 2024, Sun Country Airlines announced seasonal, once a week service to Minneapolis-Saint Paul, Minnesota.

On February 27, 2024, Breeze Airways announced their intention to serve the airport to three cities, with the first two to Orlando and Charleston beginning on June 14, 2024, and Fort Myers beginning later in October. Breeze also offers a one-stop "BreezeThru" service to Tampa via Charleston, South Carolina.

On July 24, 2024, JetBlue announced that they were beginning service out of Manchester-Boston Regional Airport starting in 2025. JetBlue said it will offer daily service to Orlando, Florida, three times weekly service to Fort Myers, Florida and four times weekly service to Fort Lauderdale, Florida starting in January 2025.

As of January 5, 2026, Avelo Airlines has paused operations to the airport.

== Airlines and destinations ==
=== Passenger ===
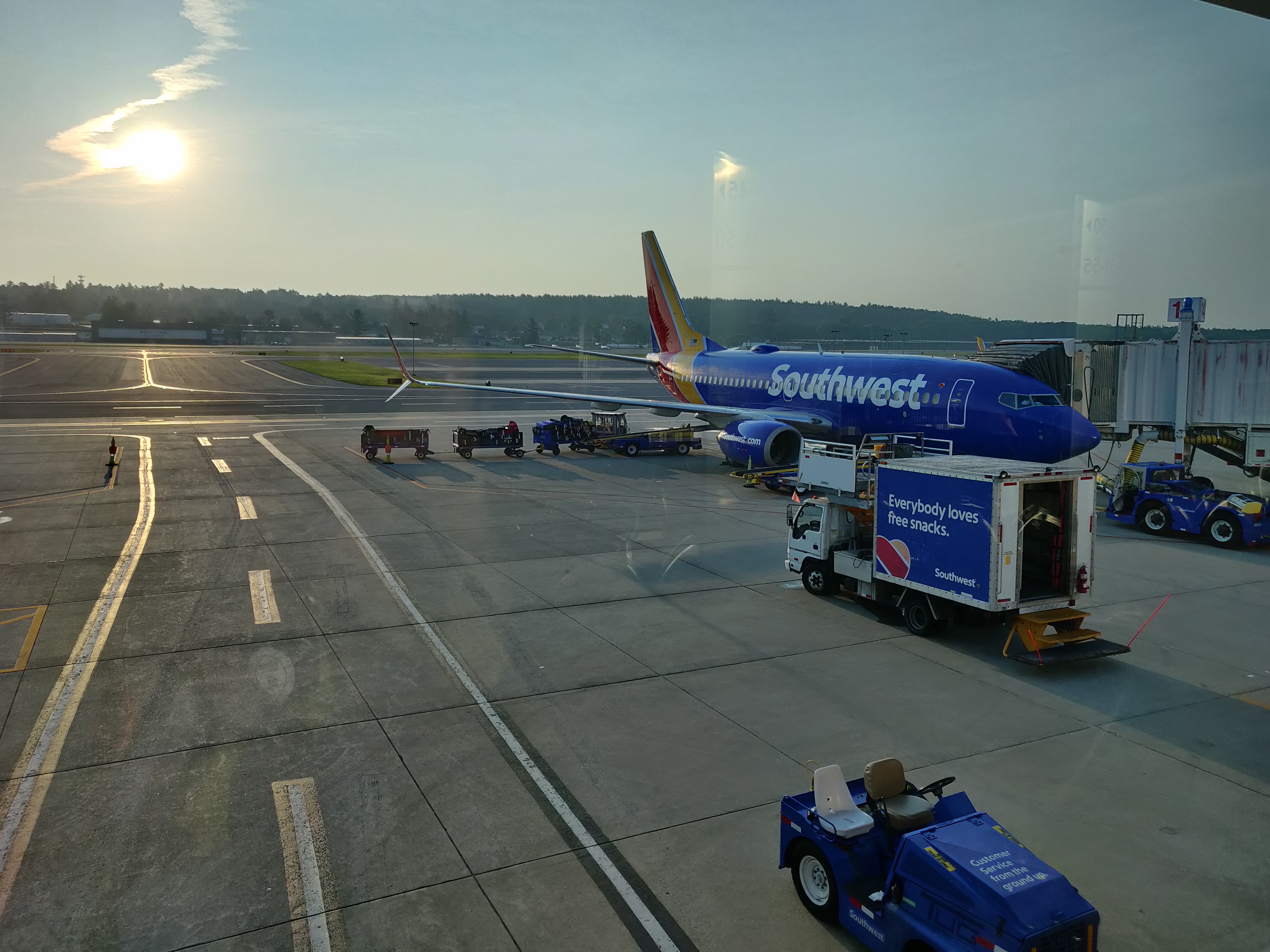
A Southwest flight in July 2021

Airlines	Destinations
American Eagle	Charlotte, Philadelphia, Washington–National; Seasonal: Chicago–O'Hare
Breeze Airways	Charleston (SC), Fort Myers, Myrtle Beach, Raleigh/Durham
Southwest Airlines	Baltimore, Chicago–Midway, Nashville, Orlando; Seasonal: Tampa
United Express	Washington–Dulles

=== Cargo ===
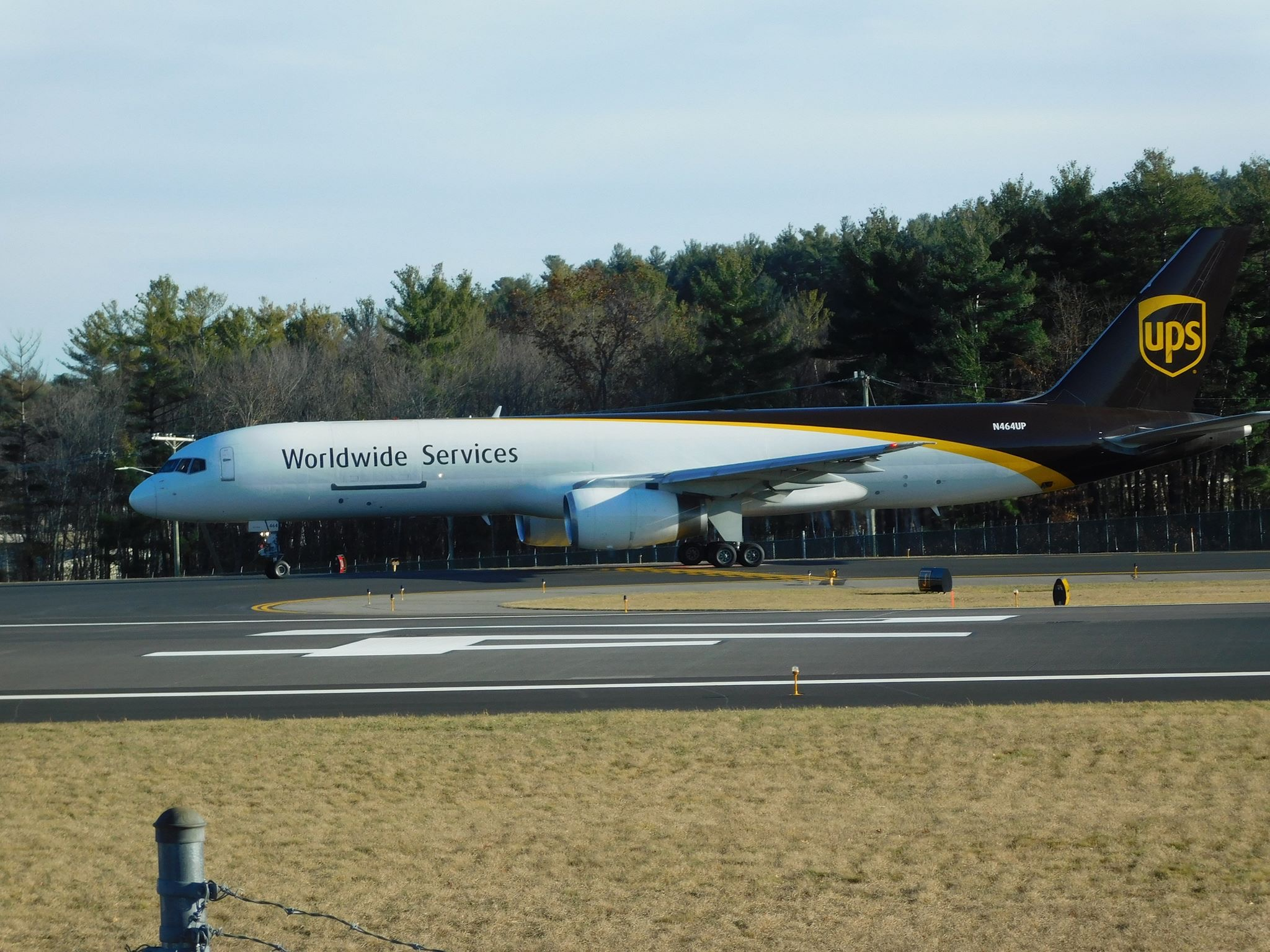
UPS Airlines B757-200F taxiing into the runway at MHT

Airlines	Destinations
Amazon Air	Cincinnati, Fort Worth/Alliance, Chicago/Rockford
Ameriflight	Auburn, Bangor, Barre/Montpelier, Burlington (VT), Portland (ME), Presque Isle, Rockland, Rutland, Waterville (ME)
FedEx Express	Memphis
UPS Airlines	Louisville, Philadelphia; Seasonal: Ontario

== Statistics ==
=== Top destinations ===
Busiest domestic routes from MHT (February 2025 – January 2026)
Rank	Airport	Passengers	Carriers
1	Baltimore, Maryland	183,070	Southwest
2	Orlando, Florida	126,410	Breeze, Southwest, JetBlue
3	Charlotte, North Carolina	59,560	American
4	(Virginia) Washington–National, D.C.	58,100	American
5	Philadelphia, Pennsylvania	50,760	American
6	Chicago–Midway, Illinois	46,940	Southwest
7	Washington–Dulles, Virginia	25,730	United
8	Chicago–O'Hare, Illinois	25,670	American
9	Fort Myers, Florida	21,390	Breeze, JetBlue
10	Raleigh/Durham, North Carolina	14,390	Breeze

=== Airline market share ===
Largest airlines at MHT (February 2025 – January 2026)
Rank	Airline	Passengers	Share
1	Southwest	634,000	46.34%
2	PSA	238,000	17.37%
3	JetBlue	144,000	10.50%
4	Piedmont	99,510	7.28%
5	Avelo	83,230	6.09%
	Other	170,000	12.43%

=== Annual traffic ===
Annual passenger traffic (enplaned + deplaned) at Manchester–Boston Airport, 1992 – 2025
1990s			2000s			2010s			2020s		
Year	Passengers	Change	Year	Passengers	Change	Year	Passengers	Change	Year	Passengers	Change
			2000	3,169,301	▲12.82%	2010	2,814,432	▼11.53%	2020	634,841	▼62.6%
			2001	3,233,555	▲2.03%	2011	2,710,747	▼3.68%	2021	944,147	▲48.7%
1992	840,361	—	2002	3,366,834	▲4.12%	2012	2,452,064	▼9.54%	2022	1,301,952	▲35.7%
1993	794,134	▼5.5%	2003	3,601,661	▲6.97%	2013	2,422,102	▼1.22%	2023	1,283,487	▼0.9%
1994	919,914	▲15.84%	2004	4,003,307	▲11.15%	2014	2,095,674	▼13.48%	2024	1,272,689	▼0.7%
1995	893,326	▼2.89%	2005	4,329,478	▲8.15%	2015	2,077,064	▼0.86%	2025	1,381,518	▲8.7%
1996	984,130	▲10.16%	2006	3,896,532	▼10%	2016	2,021,279	▼2.50%			
1997	1,108,216	▲12.61%	2007	3,892,630	▼0.1%	2017	1,970,688	▼2.50%			
1998	1,938,089	▲74.88%	2008	3,716,393	▼4.53%	2018	1,847,908	▼6.2%			
1999	2,809,089	▲44.94%	2009	3,181,249	▼14.40%	2019	1,727,532	▼6.5%			

== Ground transport ==
=== Highway access ===
In 2007, construction began on Raymond Wieczorek Drive (then known as Manchester Airport Access Road), an expressway connection from the F.E. Everett Turnpike. Before this project, access to the airport was limited to local roads off Interstate 293/NH Route 101. The access road opened on November 10, 2011, connecting the airport and NH Route 3A in Litchfield with the Everett Turnpike and U.S. Route 3 in Bedford.

=== Manchester Shuttle ===
From November 13, 2006, to June 30, 2008, the airport operated a shuttle bus — free to ticketed passengers — that ran every two hours, 24 hours a day, to the Anderson Regional Transportation Center in Woburn, Massachusetts (45 minutes), on to the Sullivan Square subway station in Boston (75 minutes), and back to the airport via Woburn. The free service shut down after a private company, Flight Line Inc., began operating a paid service along similar routes on July 1, 2008. Flight Line offers hourly service between the airport, several points in northern Massachusetts, and the city of Boston for $39 each way. Reservations are required.

=== Greyhound Lines ===
Greyhound buses offer three trips daily from Manchester Airport on its Boston–Montreal service. Buses serve Concord and Hanover in New Hampshire; White River Junction, Montpelier, and Burlington in Vermont; and Saint-Jean-sur-Richelieu and Montreal in Quebec, Canada, when going northbound. They serve South Station and Logan International Airport in Boston on the southbound trips.

=== Local bus service ===
The Manchester Transit Authority provides hourly bus service between the passenger terminal and downtown Manchester.

=== Commuter rail extension ===
A proposed extension of the MBTA Commuter Rail system's Lowell Line would see trains that currently terminate at Lowell running as far north as Manchester. The proposed Bedford/MHT Station would be constructed across the Merrimack River in Bedford underneath Raymond Wieczorek Drive, and would be intended to serve the airport and the town of Bedford.

The New Hampshire State Rail Plan of 2012 stated that freight could also be viable on the rail extension, perhaps opening up more freight opportunities for the airport.

== Law enforcement/security ==
The town of Londonderry's police are responsible for law enforcement and security operations at the airport terminal. The sheriff's department of Rockingham County was responsible for law enforcement operations at the airport until 2006 when the Londonderry Police Department was awarded the new security contract.

== Fire department/ARFF service ==
The Airport Fire Department is staffed 24 hours a day, 7 days a week, consisting of 4 on-duty personnel who work a 48-hour work week. All personnel are fully qualified NFPA structural firefighters and have acquired a follow on specialized course in aircraft rescue firefighting. All employees are certified National Registry Emergency Medical Technicians ranging from the basic level through paramedic.

== Incidents ==
=== Pre-jet age ===
On June 3, 1928, at 3:02 p.m., Lt. George Wilson's Curtiss OX-5 nosedived 40 feet (12 m) and crashed at the south end of the airport while landing before thousands of onlookers. Wilson received a gash on the face, and one passenger was pinned in the wreckage and sustained shock, cuts and bruises. The cause of the crash was a motor failure, and the plane was badly crumpled with its nose buried deeply in a swamp.

On February 19, 1933, Real N. Bourke died when the Arrow Sport two-seater he had hired from Northeast Airways burst into flames a quarter mile north of Manchester Airport on the Boone Farm. He had made a number of steep banks and wing-overs, and his landing gear struck a gully prior to the crash. It was Manchester's first fatality.

On August 5, 1938, at about 6:15 p.m., student pilot Avalon Robert Lilly Jr. was injured when a WACO biplane, powered by a Wright Whirlwind motor, attempted a loop 400 feet (120 m) off the ground, but fell and crashed 200 feet (61 m) from the Manchester Airport Administration Building. The plane belonged to Donald Lewis, who was at the controls and suffered major injuries. Lilly later died on August 12, 1938.

On December 10, 1942, a fighter plane connected to Manchester Airport (Grenier Field) crashed in Mont Vernon around noon; the unidentified pilot was uninjured.

On April 24, 1944, at 9:00 a.m., a four-motored Army B-24 Liberator bomber (#42-5111) took off from Manchester Airport and crashed into a densely wooded area on Fort Mountain near Epsom, killing all 10 crew on board.

On November 29, 1944, at 9:30 a.m., another Army B-24L (#44-49669) crashed nose-first in Pawtuckaway State Forest in Nottingham, 16 miles (26 km) northeast of Manchester, killing all nine crew. It had taken off from Manchester and was headed to Gander, Newfoundland, Canada.

On August 5, 1948, at 5:00 p.m., an AT-11 training plane and an A-26 attack bomber collided over Manchester airport, killing four.

On June 7, 1949, at 8:43 p.m., 1st Lt. William A. Primm of the 97th Fighter Squadron died during a routine training flight when he attempted an emergency landing and crashed his F-51 fighter at the end of Runway 24.

=== Post-jet age ===
On April 22, 1971, at 5:00 pm, an 18-year-old single-engine Beechcraft Bonanza, registered to New England Aviation Corp., crashed during takeoff, killing four people (one crew, three passengers).

On July 31, 1973, Delta Air Lines Flight 723 from Burlington, Vermont, to Boston was diverted to Manchester to pick up passengers stranded by a flight cancellation. After leaving Manchester it continued to Boston, but during landing there the McDonnell Douglas DC-9-31 hit a sea wall at the end of Runway 4, killing 83 passengers and six crew.

On October 3, 1979, a small private plane carrying Agnetha Fältskog of the Swedish pop band ABBA was traveling on one of the last legs of their 1979 North American tour (New York City to Boston). The plane flew through one of the worst severe storms in recent Connecticut history. It is speculated that the plane may have encountered a tornado during this event. It was able to make a diversion to Manchester landing on a second attempt while low on fuel. This was a key moment in starting Fältskog's fear of air travel.

On November 2, 1990, US Airways Flight 506 to Pittsburgh collided with a flock of birds after takeoff. No one was injured and the DC-9 returned safely to MHT.

On January 22, 1991, at 10:10 am, Continental Express Flight 3550 from Newark went off runway 7. No one was injured and the cause of the crash was ruled to be a hydraulic steering mechanism failure.

On November 8, 2005, AirNow Air Cargo Flight 352 crashed after a refueling stop on a flight from Essex County Airport in Fairfield Township, Essex County, New Jersey to Bangor International Airport, Bangor, Maine. The aircraft suffered a failure of the left engine upon takeoff, resulting in an uncontrolled left descent. The Embraer 110 crashed into a Walmart Garden Center approximately one-half mile (0.80 km) north of the airport, shearing off both wings upon impact. The pilot was helped from the wreckage by customers and employees of the Garden Center.

On September 23, 2020, Air Force 2, a modified Boeing 757 carrying then U.S. Vice President Mike Pence on a flight from Manchester to Washington, D.C., suffered a bird strike while climbing out of the airport. The airplane returned safely and the former Vice President and his staff flew out on a cargo airplane later that day. No injuries were reported as a result of the incident.

On January 19, 2021, a Piper Malibu Meridian (registration N641WA) flying in from Olathe, Kansas, skidded off the runway while landing. Emergency services were dispatched to the aircraft's location, and the pilot and passengers all made it out with no major injuries.

On December 10, 2021, a Castle Air Swearingen Metroliner, flying in from Essex County Airport in New Jersey, crashed into the western bank of the Merrimack River, while attempting to land on runway 6 around 11:30 pm. The pilot, who was the sole occupant, was killed upon impact.

On January 5, 2022, a FedEx Boeing 767 Bound for Memphis slid off taxiway H due to an ice storm and struck the airport's anemometer around 9:00 am. No injuries were reported and the left wing of the plane received moderate damage. This event led to a three-hour-long shutdown of airport operations.

On January 26, 2024, a Wiggins Airways flight to Presque Isle International Airport, Wiggins Air Flight 1046, crashed shortly after takeoff, injuring the pilot. The aircraft involved was a Beechcraft Model 99. It was totally destroyed after a nearly level descent into a wooded area close to a residential building, although no fire ensued.

== Solar panels ==
In 2012, south-facing solar panels were installed on the roof of the parking garage, but they caused so much glare for the nearby control tower for 45 minutes each morning that they were removed, and later replaced with 2,210 panels (460 kW AC) that were reoriented to the east to eliminate the glare. The airport expects to save $100,000 each year on electricity by having the solar panels. The efficiency of east or west facing panels is reduced by about 10%, so more panels were added so the total generation would be about the same. The array is expected to generate about 585,000 kWh each year.

== Gallery ==
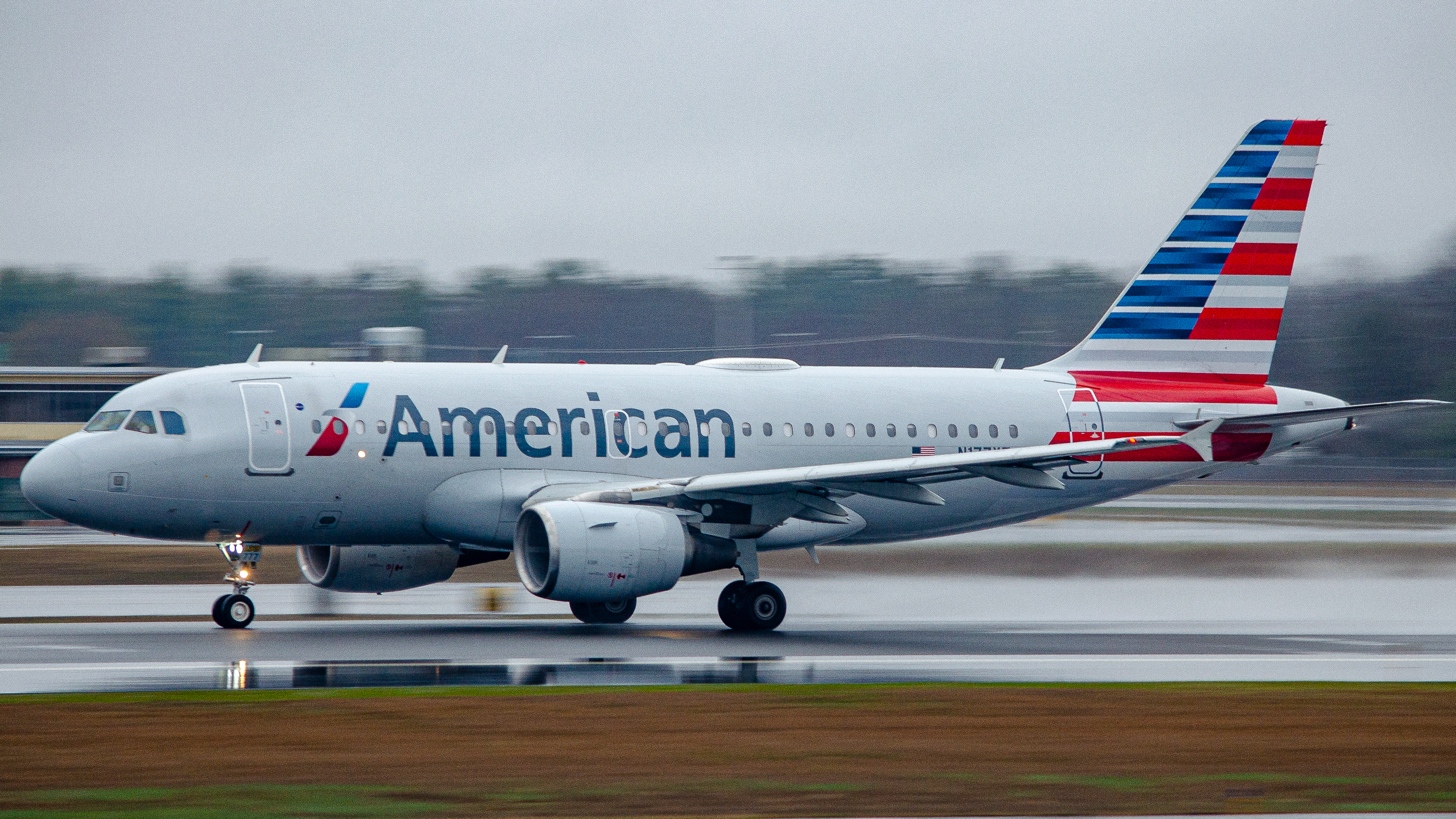
An American Airlines Airbus A319 speeds down Runway 17 before taking off at MHT during rainy weather.

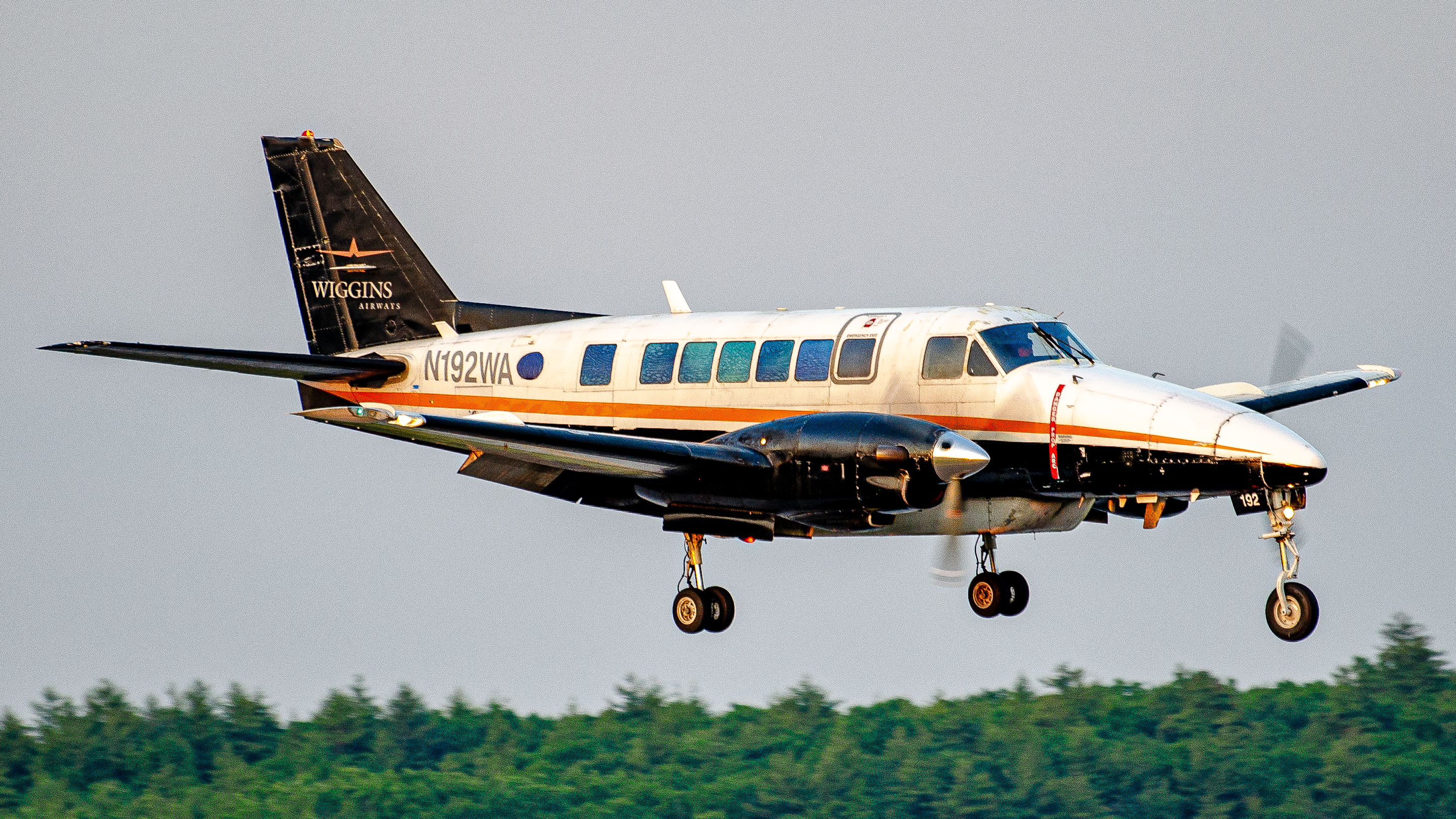
A Wiggins Airways Beech 99 Airliner arrives Runway 24 at MHT

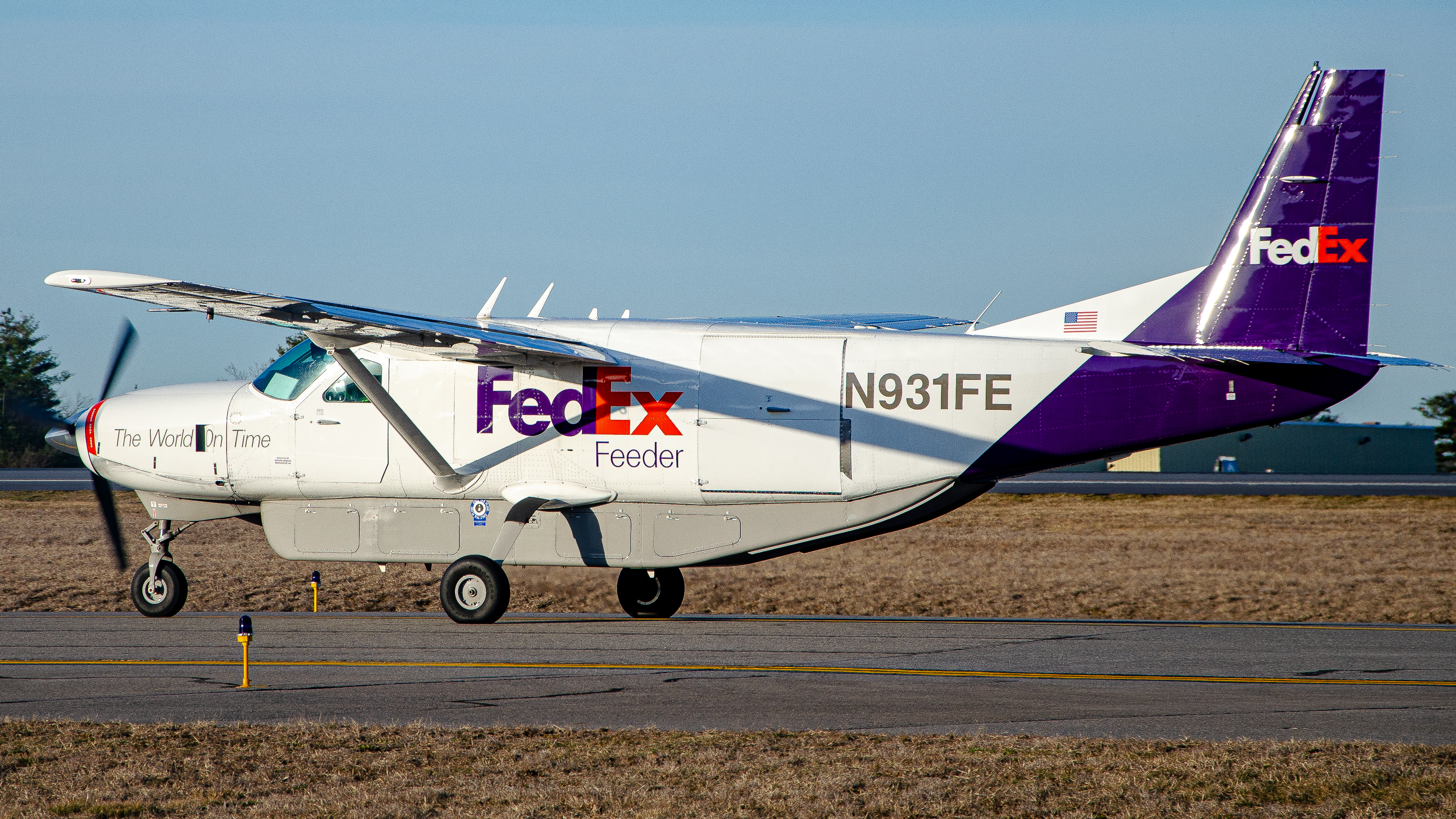
FedEx Feeder C208 taxiing to Runway 35 at MHT

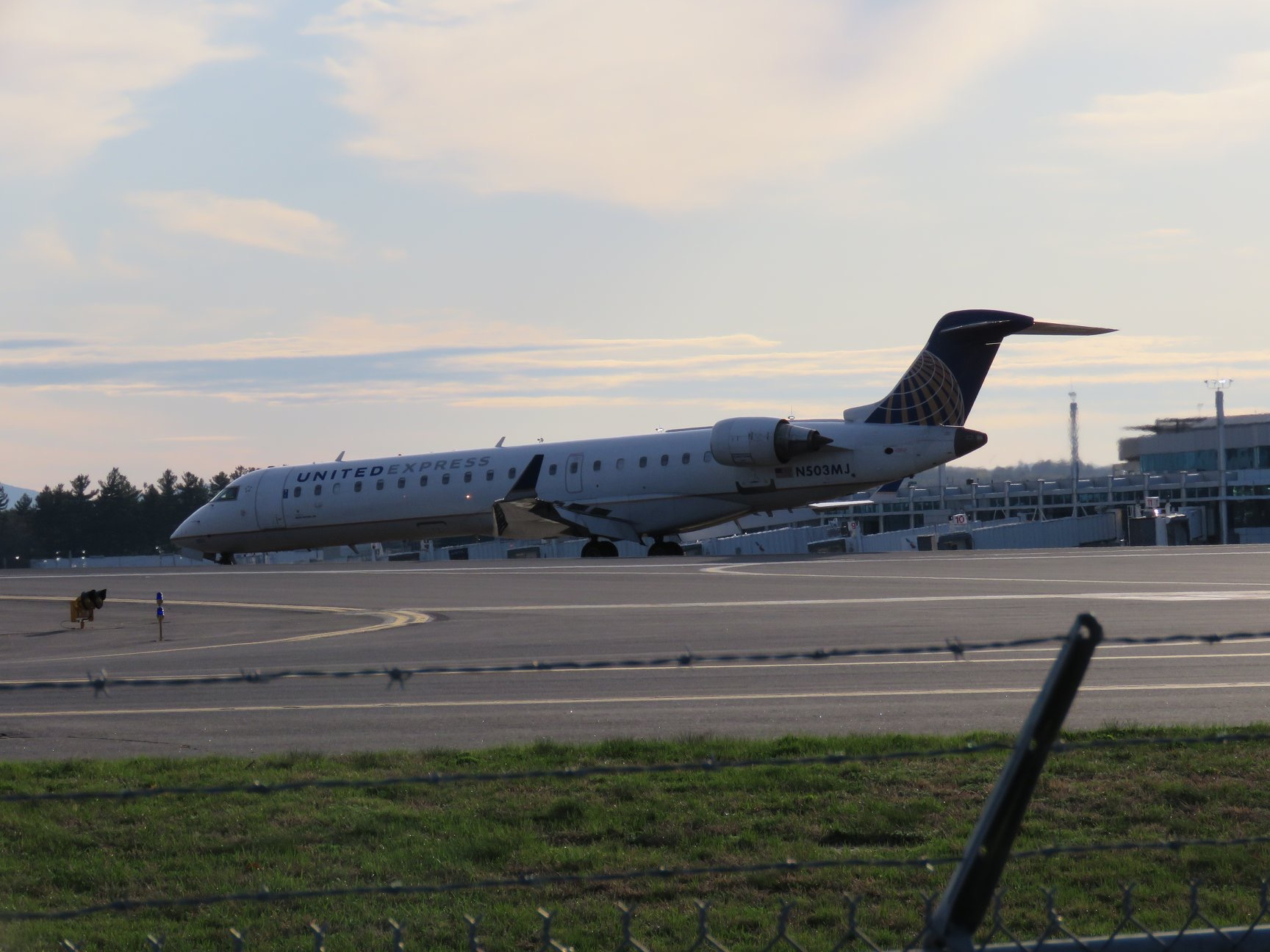
United Express CRJ700 taxiing off the runway at MHT

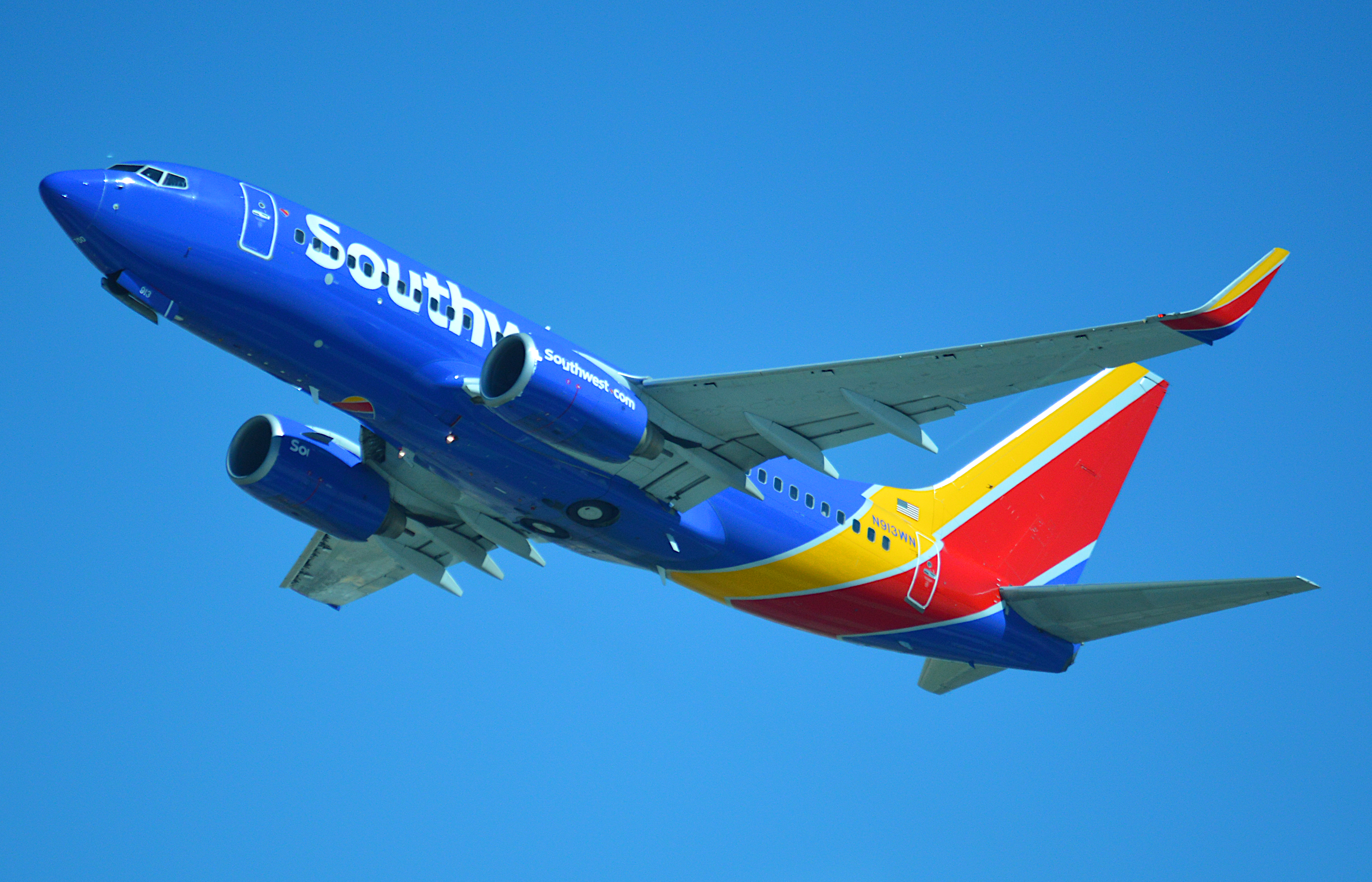
Southwest 737-700 (N913WN) departing from MHT

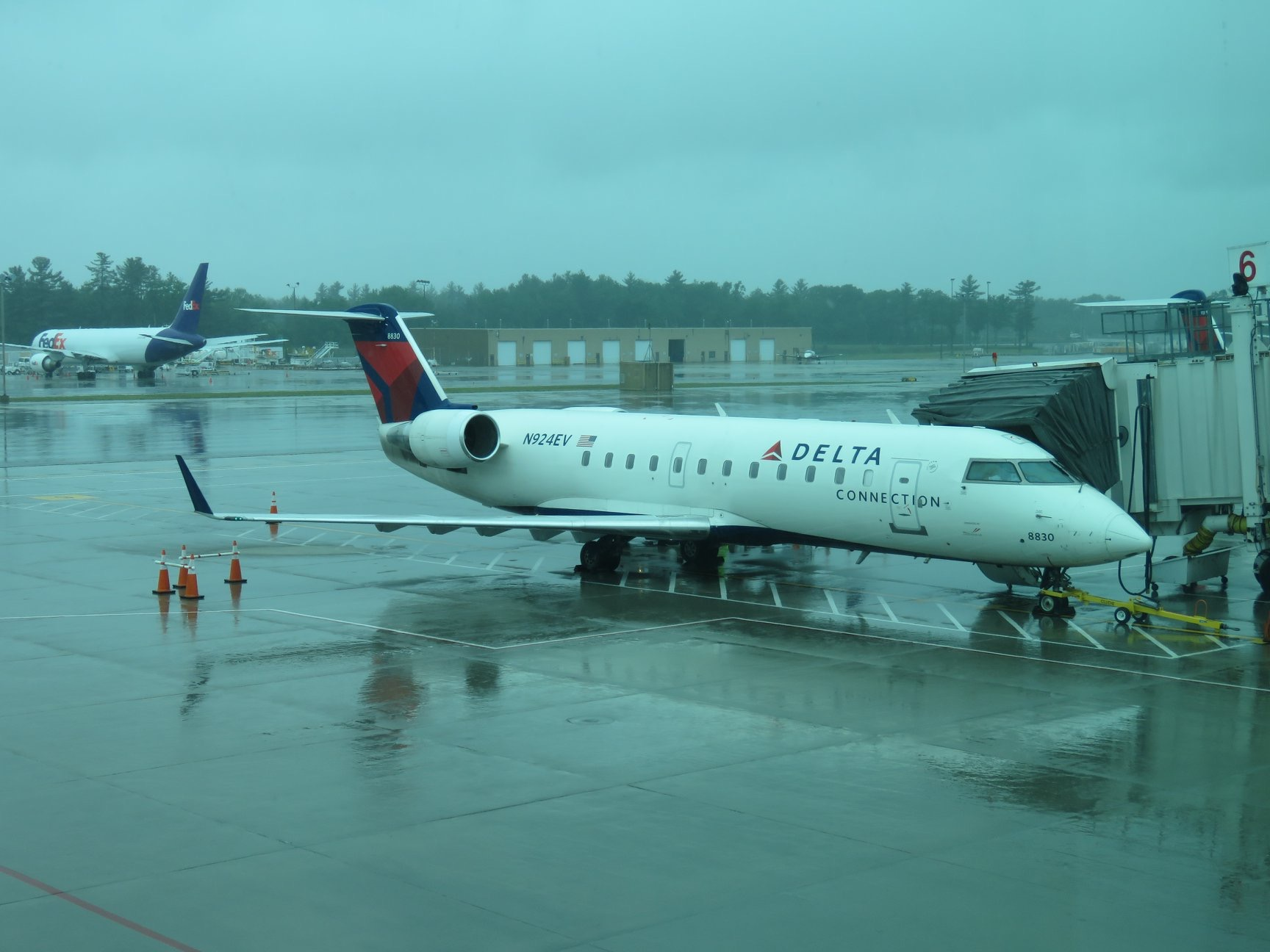
Delta Connection CRJ200 at Gate 6 in MHT

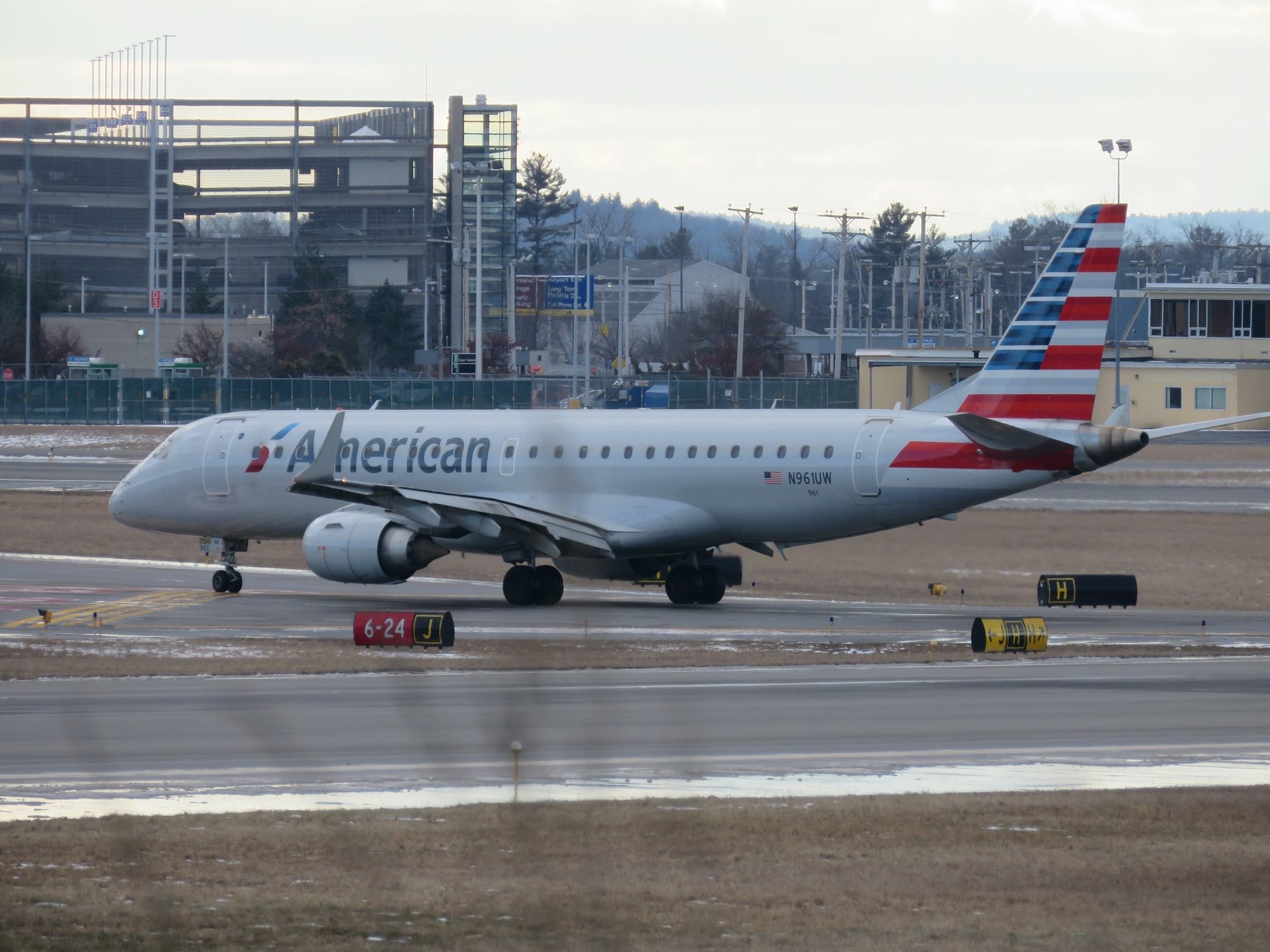
American Airlines E190 at MHT

== See also ==
- List of cities with more than one commercial airport
