= Franconia Airport =

- IATA: none; ICAO: none; FAA LID: 1B5

Summary
- Airport type: Public
- Operator: Franconia Inn
- Location: Franconia, New Hampshire
- Elevation AMSL: 970 ft (300 m)
- Coordinates: 44°11′45″N 71°44′58″W
- Website: Official website

Map
- Interactive map of Franconia Airport

Runways
Direction	Length		Surface
Direction	ft	m	Surface
18/36	2,305	703	Turf
- Source: Federal Aviation Administration

Franconia Airport (FAA LID: 1B5) is a public airport located in Franconia, New Hampshire, two miles (3 km) south of the central business district of Franconia, in Grafton County, New Hampshire, United States. The airport is the home of the Franconia Soaring Association. There are no commercial flights available.

== See also ==
- List of airports in New Hampshire
