= Camp Walt Whitman =

Summer camp in Piermont, New Hampshire, United States

Coordinates: 43°56′59″N 71°58′18″W

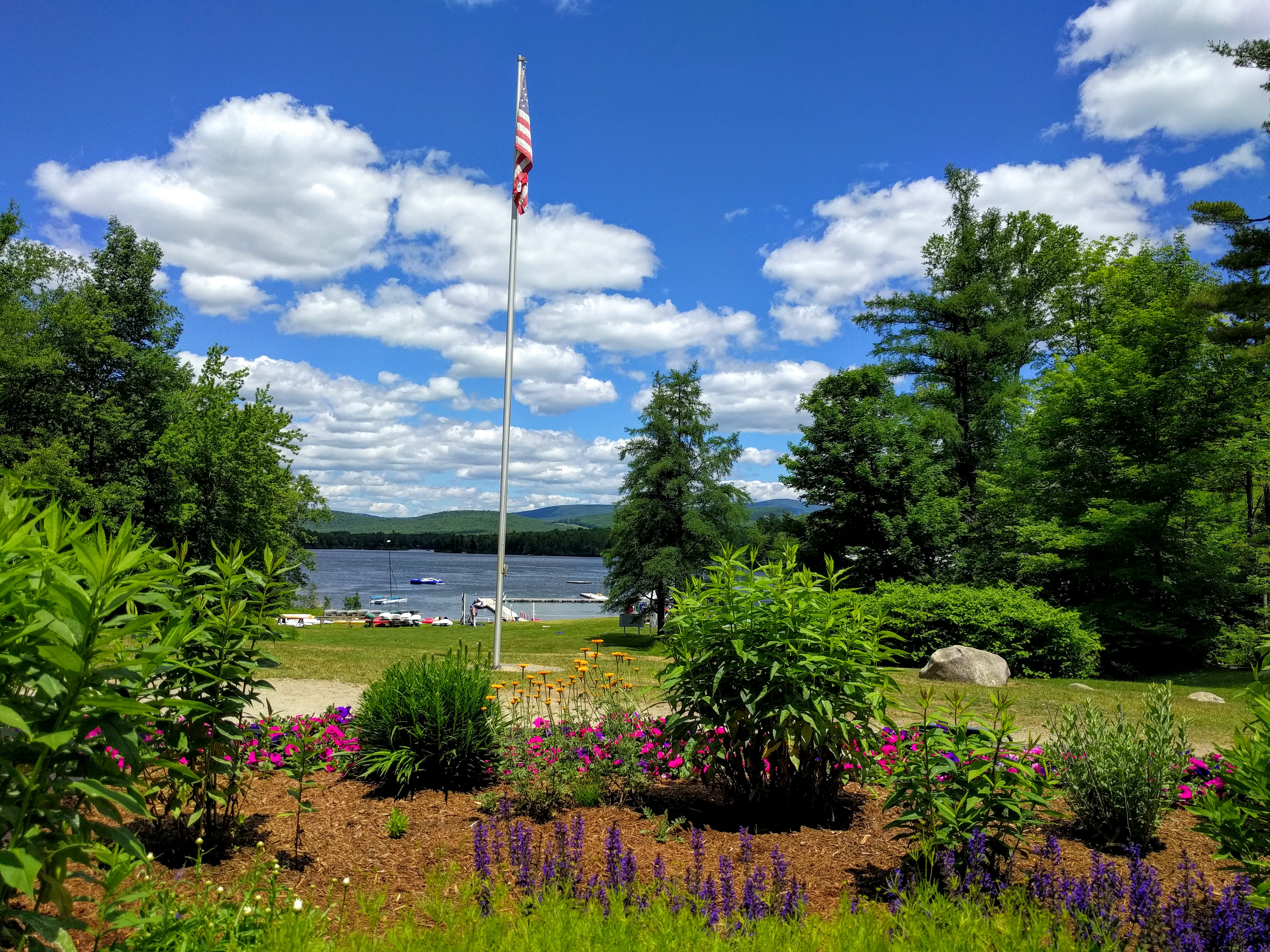
- The view from Camp Walt Whitman's dining hall.
- Interactive map of Camp Walt Whitman
- Location: Piermont, New Hampshire
- Type: Summer camp
- Water: Lake Armington
- Established: 1948
- Website: www.campwalt.com

Camp Walt Whitman (abbreviated CWW) is a traditional, overnight, and co-educational summer camp located in Piermont, New Hampshire along the shore of Lake Armington. It was founded in 1948 by Arnie and Chick Soloway and has remained in the family; it is today run by Carolyn and Jed Dorfman. It is named after poet Walt Whitman.

The camp's activities include tennis, golf, archery, gymnastics, pottery, hiking, sailing, and others. As of 2018, the cost of the camp's full seven-week session is US$12,950. The majority of campers are Jewish children from the New York metropolitan area, but the camp has no official religious or geographic affiliation. The camp has a return rate between 85% and 90%.
