= Aviation Museum of New Hampshire =

Museum in Londonderry, New Hampshire, US

Coordinates: 42°55′38″N 71°25′41″W

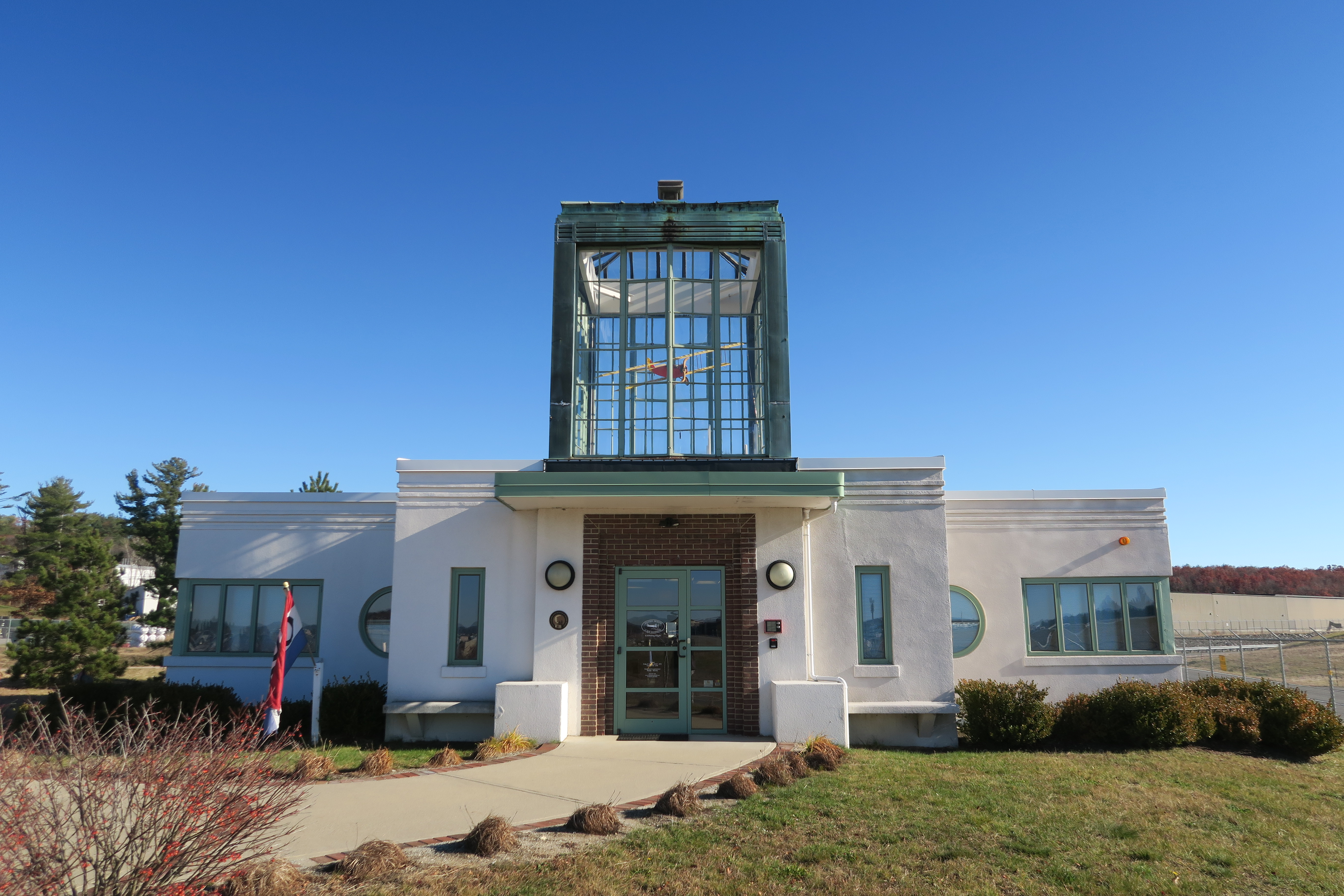
- Location: 27 Navigator Road, Londonderry, New Hampshire
- Executive Director: Jeff Rapsis
- Associate Director: Leah Dearborn
- Main organ: The Aeronaut
- Parent organization: New Hampshire Aviation Historical Society
- Website: www.nhahs.org

The Aviation Museum of New Hampshire is a historical museum operated by the New Hampshire Aviation Historical Society, a non-profit group that preserves the history of flight in the U.S. state of New Hampshire. The organization's goal is to preserve New Hampshire aviation history through a series of dynamic and hands-on exhibits and programs, as the museum's website states.

The museum exists alongside runway 35/17 at Manchester–Boston Regional Airport that parallels a portion of the now-defunct Manchester and Lawrence Railroad. It is housed in the 1937 terminal and control tower that was moved to the east side of the airport at 27 Navigator Road in Londonderry, New Hampshire in 2004. The museum building was enlarged in 2011 by the addition of the Slusser Aviation Learning Center, funded through a generous gift by NH philanthropists Eugene and Ann Slusser.

The museum supports plane building programs at three NH high schools: Manchester School of Technology, Lebanon, and Farmington.

== Notable aviators from New Hampshire ==
- Laurence Carbee Craigie
- Rob Holland
- Gordon J. Humphrey
- Joseph C. McConnell
- Alan Shepard
- Harrison Thyng
