= White Mountain Airport (New Hampshire) =

Airport in New Hampshire, United States

White Mountain Airport (Defunct)
- IATA: none; ICAO: none; FAA LID: ~~CWN~~

Summary
- Elevation AMSL: 495 ft (151 m)
- Coordinates: 44°01′21″N 71°06′41″W

Map
- Interactive map of White Mountain Airport (Defunct)

Runways
Direction	Length		Surface
Direction	ft	m	Surface
	2,940	896	Asphalt

White Mountain Airport was a private airport located in North Conway, in Carroll County, New Hampshire, United States. This general aviation airport had one runway.

The airport closed in the late 1980s. The property has since become the site of Settlers' Green Outlet Village and hotel, as well as the proposed site for the middle segment of the Conway Bypass.

== History ==
In 1921, the Carroll County Park Association procured approximately 140 acres (57 ha) of land in a series of purchases. The property included a grandstand and racing track that had hosted horse racing and motorcycle racing over the years, as well as providing a fairgrounds and a site for early regional aerial barnstorming. There was also a dance hall.

In October 1929 the association sold the land to the White Mountain Airport Corporation for $4,100. When the corporation was formed, the buildings on the property were sold and the airport developers tore down the grandstand and stalls.

Ralph P. Newhall and his brother-in-law Walter J. Maguire (an agent for the Shell Eastern Petroleum Corporation) started the Eagle Flying Service on the property in 1930. The Conway Village Airport was a second airfield just a few miles away. During his years as part of the New England Air Circus Association, Wylie Apte participated in several air shows at both the Conway Village and White Mountain airports and was known to the Airport Corporation. When Newhall and Maguire sought to extricate themselves from the flying business, they persuaded Apte to take over the operation on a year-to-year lease arrangement working on a percentage basis. Prior to this, Apte was a founder of the New England Air Circus Association with Lee Bowman. He had also been manager at Parlin Field and Twin Mountain airports.

In 1934, Apte accepted their offer and became the manager of the airport operations at the White Mountain Airport. He persuaded the White Mountain Airport Corporation to clear away the trees so that he could taxi near the highway, and in 1935 a WPA project cleared off the stumps and enlarged the runway to 1,500 feet (460 m).

When the US entered World War II in December 1941 following the bombing of Pearl Harbor, Apte closed the White Mountain Airport operation and joined the Coastal Air Patrol as a 1st Lieutenant Pilot. When he returned from his WWII service, he presented the White Mountain Airport Corporation with a proposal to sell him the property. The Airport Corporation was dissolved May 4, 1943, and sold the property to Apte in July 1943, who had by that time acquired 101 of the original 108 shares.

Wylie Apte, Sr. died in August 1970. Following his death, his son Wylie (Bunky) Apte, Jr. assumed control of the White Mountain Airport. By the mid-1970s Bunky had made the airport into a busy tourist attraction with a fleet of five Waco UPF-7 open cockpit bi-planes, a helicopter, sailplane, and several Piper and Cessna aircraft providing scenic rides and charter flights. Because sightseeing rides are highly seasonal, Wylie sought support and partnership from the Town of Conway in the late 1970s. By the 1980s the area of North Conway had substantially changed, with many new commercial businesses moving to the area. This resulted in a significant overhaul of property taxes which made it impossible to make the airport a financial success. Wylie Apte sold the property to developers who established the Settlers' Green Outlet Village on the site in 1988.

== Search and rescue ==
The airport and Wylie Apte, Sr. played a role in several search and rescue efforts over the years, flying missions for the forest fire patrol, lost persons, drowning accidents, hospital patients, and the Northeast airline tragedy. Some of the more notable early search and rescue efforts from the White Mountain Airport included the following:

In June 1933, Joseph Simon, a young man from Brookline, Massachusetts, was lost while hiking with friends to the Lakes of the Clouds on Mount Washington. The group had not prepared themselves with food or supplies appropriate for the hike and were separated as the weather turned bad. Apte conducted an aerial search for Simon, flying low over the wooded terrain in dangerous air currents over Mount Washington for two days. Ultimately, Simon was found, but had died due to exposure.

In October 1941, five-year-old Pamela Hollingsworth, daughter of a prominent Lowell, Massachusetts, businessman, was lost in the woods near Albany, New Hampshire, and Mount Chocorua, setting off a kidnapping scare and massive eight-day search involving hundreds of searchers. Apte and several other pilots from the White Mountain Airport flew searches to help locate the girl. When she was found she said that she had heard the airplanes' motors but was unable to signal the planes due to the density of the forest.

In August 1952 Charlotte Cook from Windham Center, Connecticut, disappeared in the White Mountain National Forest. Apte and two other pilots from the White Mountain Airport flew several search flights low over the search area communicating with ground search parties via radio.

== Airport improvements ==
Hard-surface runway: The general aviation industry was pressed for airstrips just as the auto industry pressed for roads. By the 1960s it was clear that improved access should be provided as more modern light aircraft were not suited to grass landings. The project involved the construction of a hard surfaced black top runway, 3,000 feet (910 m) long and 60 feet (18 m) wide, to handle all single-engine and the majority of multi-engine business and corporate aircraft. Alvin Coleman and Son did the construction, assisted by an airport engineer from the NH State Aeronautics Commission. At the south end of the runway they hauled in 10 loads of sand and removed the cabins along with the old blue spruce. The cost was under $7000, financed in part by Mr. Apte and by contributions from local businessmen and interested persons. Materials were provided at cost. The new runway was dedicated July 30, 1961. John Poor from North Conway was the Master of Ceremonies. William T. Piper from Piper Aircraft Corporation, Lock Haven, Pennsylvania, was guest speaker. More than 60 planes flew into North Conway for the dedication ceremonies. FAA officials and Russell Hilliard, NH Aeronautics Commission Director, spoke.

Paved taxiway, ramp, fuel system: In the late 1960s a paved taxiway from the runway to the hangar area was put in. Wylie Jr. assumed control of the airport following the death of Wylie Sr. in 1970 and put in a paved ramp, paved taxiways, up to date fuel system, and an office complex.

New hangar: In the fall of 1952, the airport's hangar burned down. A new hangar was dedicated in 1963. It was constructed by Harold J. Coles utilizing prefabricated trusses that were trucked in. In the early 1970s, Wylie Jr. built a modern maintenance hangar and additional hangar space for 30 resident planes.

Plowing for winter use: Until the 1970s, the airport was seasonal and not open in the winter. After the runway, taxiway, and ramp were paved, it was possible to plow and make the airport available for winter use. Parker Morton designed and used a prototype for plowing the airport.

== Fly-ins, air shows ==
As manager at the White Mountain Airport, Apte organized and participated in many air shows starting in the 1930s. These meets included air races, rides, and thrilling aerial stunts performed by New England's early aviators, including:

- Apte demonstrating target bombing, motor cranked in mid-air
- Harold Brown demonstrating delayed parachute jumps from 2,000 and later 4,000 feet. He also demonstrated the Bat Jump at the White Mountain Airport in 1935 – the first time this type of jump had been demonstrated east of the Mississippi. This jump was performed in a special bat suit. During free fall, he would do loops and rolls in the air before opening his chute.
- Lee Bowman
- Pete Dana, noted as the youngest New England Transport pilot to perform aerial acrobatics and stunts. In 1935 he demonstrated his low-wing Ryan all-metal speed plane that he used in an attempt to set a speed record flying from California in 25 hours.
- Larry D. Ruch, an officer in the US Naval Reserve, who performed acrobatics and stunt flying of all kinds, including a dead stick dive loop without motor from 4,000 feet; mid-air cockpit change; upside down flying; tailspin from 6,000 feet; plus acrobatics consisting of loops, rolls, slow rolls, Immelman turns, Hammerhead whip stalls, zooms, wing overs, and chandelles.
- C. John West of Berlin, New Hampshire, demonstrating landing his airplane with a dead motor from 1,500 feet above the airport; dropping bombs on targets to demonstrate how it was done in the Army Air Service; and dive bombing, diving at the target and then releasing his bomb, instead of dropping it from horizontal flight.
- Walton Waite of Morrisville, Vermont, flying a J 6-5 Waco
- Ralf Stancliffe flying a Lycombing powered Stinson
- Lafayette Goslin from Berlin, New Hampshire, in his Great Lakes
- Gordon Brown of the Brown Company of Berlin, New Hampshire, flying a Travel Air biplane powered with a Wright motor
- Elmore Barnes from Twin Mountain, flying a Command-Aire
- Bob Hayes from Plymouth, New Hampshire, flying a Curtis Robin
- F. Gillingham from Newport, New Hampshire, flying his Challenger Command-Aire
- Floyd Miller from Laconia, New Hampshire
- Bob Thompson from Holderness, New Hampshire
- Percy Osborn of Newport, New Hampshire, flying his fleet

For an air show in 1935, the Radio Club set up air-to-ground radio to allow passengers in the airplanes to talk to the people on the ground during their flight.

In 1963 the airport hosted a Fly-In for the annual meeting of the Aviation Association of NH in support of a joint project by the North Conway Chamber of Commerce, the Eastern Slope Jaycees, and the Eastern Slope Ski Club.

== Soaring ==
In 1938, Lew Barringer made what is generally recognized as the first sailplane wave flight in North America. At the time, he and others were exploring ridge conditions in the east central area of New Hampshire, when he found himself on top of the clouds just west of North Conway Airport. This was evidently a wave off the Moat Mountains and is worthy of mention due to its proximity to the airport. It took 28 years before another wave flight was made in the area, when in October 1966 a small group successfully explored the major wave system 20 miles (32 km) to the north in the lee of Mount Washington.
