= Conway Bypass (New Hampshire) =

Conway Bypass (Proposed)
- Location: Carroll County, New Hampshire
- From: Madison
- To: Bartlett
- Bypassing: Conway, North Conway
- Agency: NHDOT

The Conway Bypass was a proposed rerouting of New Hampshire Route 16 around the villages of Conway and North Conway, New Hampshire, United States. Multiple related early-stage projects were completed, including upgrading the North–South Road near North Conway. In September 2020, NH Department of Transportation Commissioner Victoria Sheehan indicated that the department would move to formally dissolve the remainder of the project. The main reasons given for not completing the project were the massive overall cost (estimated at $175 million) and improvements in traffic congestion in Conway Village resulting from smaller roadway improvement projects, such as the North-South Road.

The proposed route was split into three sections: southern, middle, and northern.

== Proposed sections ==
Southern

The southern section was planned to run from the two-lane section of present-day Route 16 near the Conway–Albany border to the US 302–NH 113 intersection, effectively detouring to the south of Conway village.

Middle

The middle section of the highway was planned to run from the US 302–NH 113 intersection to near the present day Wal-Mart location, crossing the site of the former White Mountain Airport. Portions of this leg saw preliminary work, such as clearing.

Northern

The northern section of the highway was planned to run adjacent to the North–South Road near North Conway. Preliminary work was done to facilitate this, including a leg leading from a new rotary.

== Funding ==
New Hampshire state laws require NHDOT to propose an improvement plan for the state's transportation system every two years. In practice, these plans look forward 10 years, hence are known as "10-year plans".

On June 25, 2008, then Governor of New Hampshire John Lynch signed the state's 2009–2018 Ten Year Transportation Improvement Plan, which included the southern leg of the Conway Bypass. Construction was planned to start in 2015 and last four years, splitting the southern leg of the bypass into three phases during that time.

The middle and northern sections were not part of the 2009–2018 plan. On April 13, 2010, with doubt of the middle and northern sections being built, Conway voters removed the late-1990s-created overlay district for these sections, allowing for development within 500 feet (150 m) of the state-owned bypass corridor.

On July 2, 2018, Governor Chris Sununu signed the state's 2019–2028 Ten Year Transportation Improvement Plan. That plan contained two sections regarding the Conway bypass:

- "358:9 Conway. The state aid highway program funding for the project named Conway, project number 40018, for $702,211 shall be removed and replaced with $702,211 in federal funds."
- "358:17 Department of Transportation; Conway. The projects named Conway, project numbers 11339J, 11339T, and 13339U which were previously removed from the state 10-year transportation plan, are added to the plan using federal funds totaling one dollar."

The placeholder projects (11339J, 11339T, and 13339U) were subsequently removed in the 2021-2030 Ten Year Transportation Improvement Plan. In September, 2020 NHDOT Commissioner Victoria Sheehan indicated that the Department will move to formally dissolve the remainder of the project.

As of 2020, NHDOT had spent $44 million to purchase land for a right-of-way for the bypass, including some federal funds. NHDOT may be obligated to pay back up to $19 million in federal funds to the Federal Highway Administration if the corridor is not use for a transportation purpose.
