= Lake Tarleton State Park =

State park in New Hampshire, United States

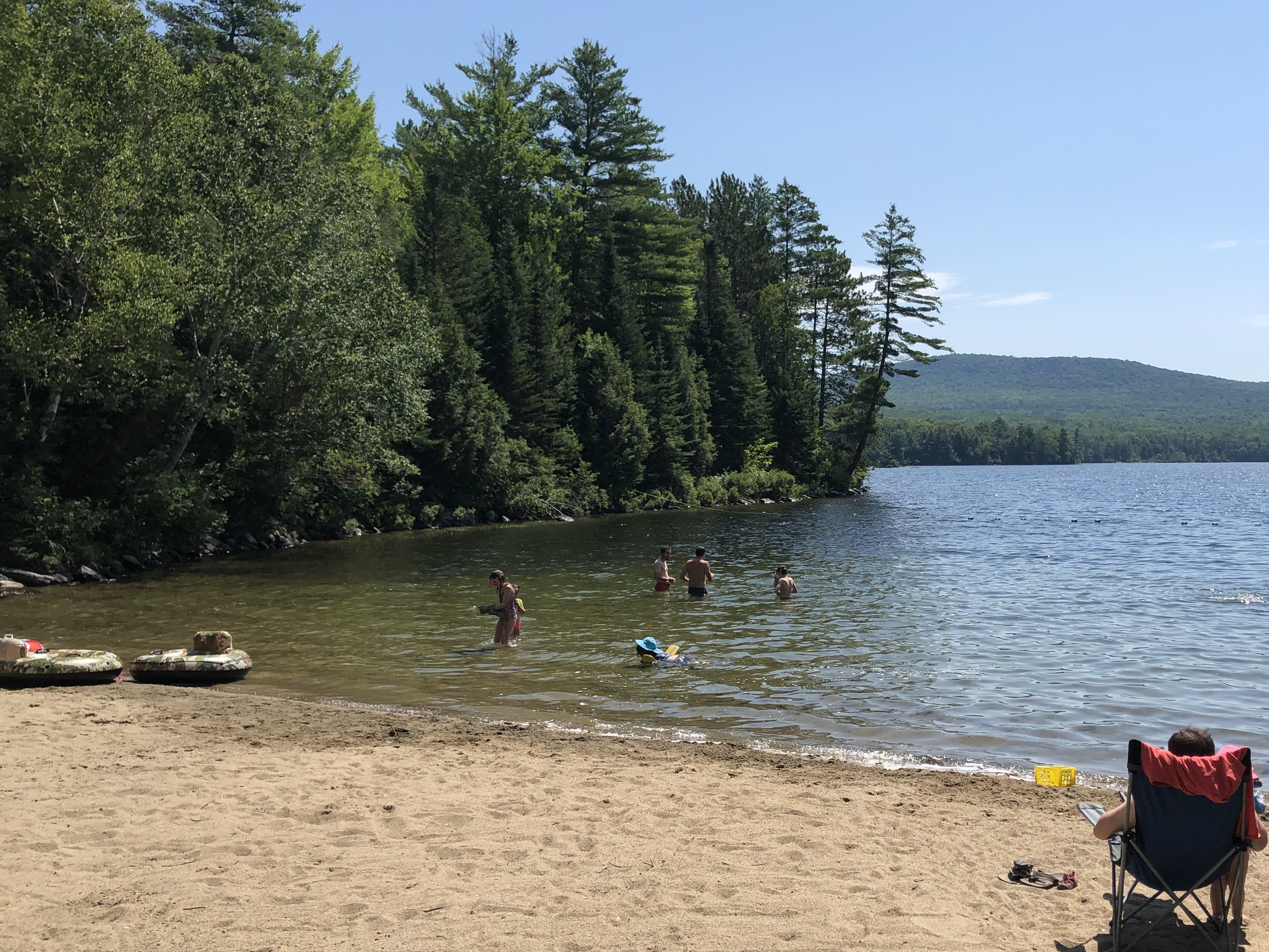
- Interactive map of Lake Tarleton State Park
- Location: Piermont, New Hampshire, United States
- Coordinates: 43°59′01″N 71°58′33″W
- Area: 48 acres (19 ha)
- Established: 1999
- Administrator: New Hampshire Division of Parks and Recreation
- Website: Official website
New Hampshire State Parks
Lake Tarleton State Park
- Location within New Hampshire

Lake Tarleton State Park is an undeveloped 48-acre (19 ha) state park on Lake Tarleton in Piermont, New Hampshire, United States. It features an unguarded swimming beach and opportunities for fishing and hunting, swimming, canoeing, hiking and picnicking. The park saw its genesis when the state purchased land on the northwestern tip of Lake Tarleton for $525,000 in 1999.
