= Gorham Airport =

- IATA: none; ICAO: none; FAA LID: 2G8

Summary
- Airport type: Private
- Operator: Gorham Water & Sewer Department
- Location: Gorham, New Hampshire
- Elevation AMSL: 835 ft (255 m)
- Coordinates: 44°23′35″N 71°11′48″W
- Website: Official website

Map
- Interactive map of Gorham Airport

Runways
Direction	Length		Surface
Direction	ft	m	Surface
12/30	2,667	813	Turf
- Source: Federal Aviation Administration

Gorham Airport (FAA LID: 2G8) is a private airport located in Gorham, New Hampshire, one mile (1.6 km) north-west of the central business district (CBD) of Gorham, in Coos County, New Hampshire, USA. Due to its proximity to Mt. Washington, the airport has been used to support glider flights exploring the wave system of the Presidential, Sandwich, Carter-Moriah, Pilot, Kinsman and Mahoosuc ranges in northern New Hampshire.

== Airlines and destinations ==
There are no commercial flights available.

== See also ==
- List of airports in New Hampshire
