= Plymouth Municipal Airport (New Hampshire) =

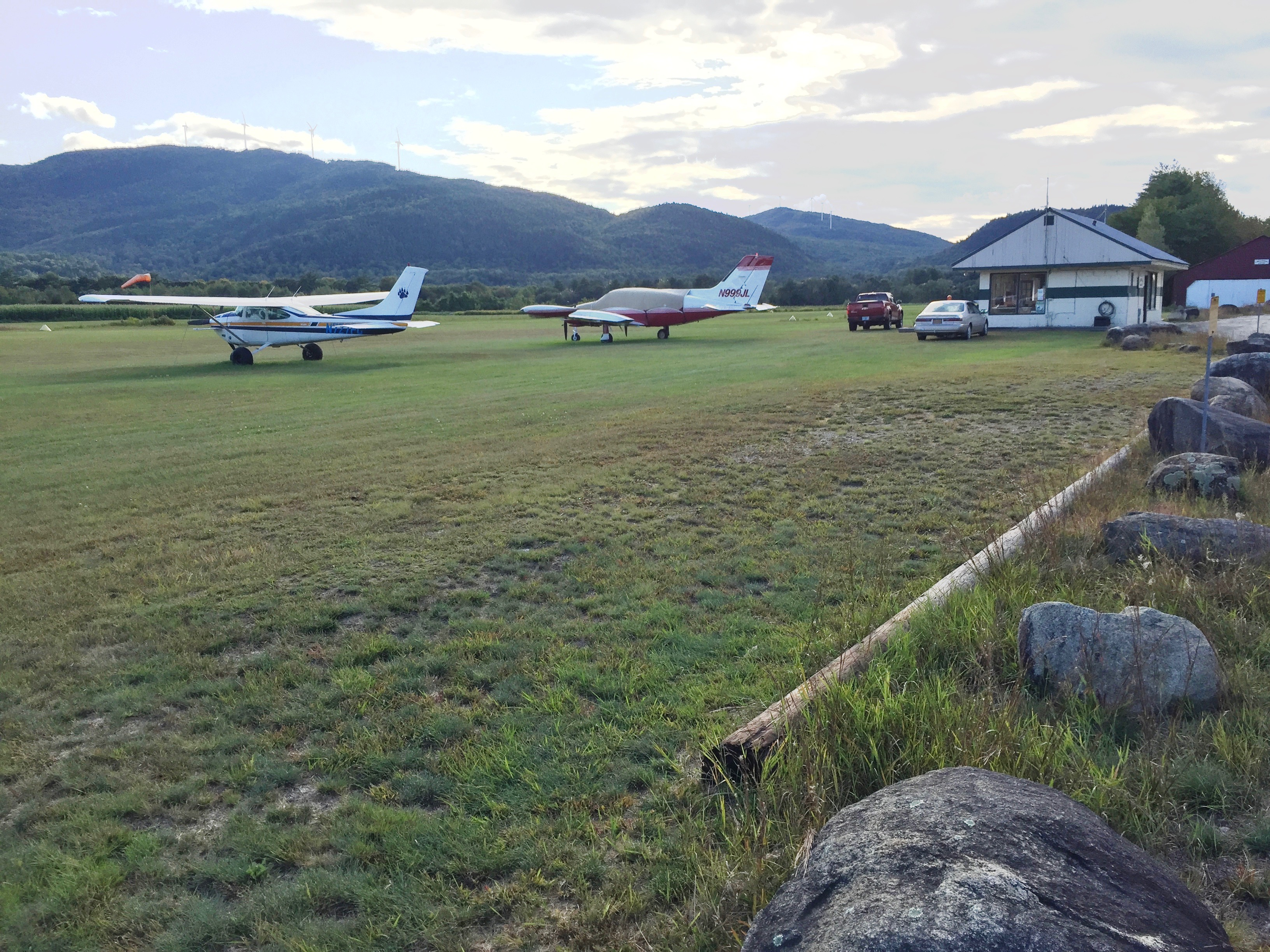
- IATA: none; ICAO: none; FAA LID: 1P1

Summary
- Airport type: Public
- Operator: Town of Plymouth, New Hampshire
- Location: Plymouth, New Hampshire
- Elevation AMSL: 505 ft / 154 m
- Coordinates: 43°46′45″N 71°45′13″W
- Website: Official website

Map
- Interactive map of Plymouth Municipal Airport

Runways
Direction	Length		Surface
Direction	ft	m	Surface
12/30	2,380	725	Turf
- Source: Federal Aviation Administration

Plymouth Municipal Airport (FAA LID: 1P1) is a public airport located in Plymouth, New Hampshire, three miles (5 km) north-west of the central business district of Plymouth, in Grafton County, New Hampshire, United States. It is included in the Federal Aviation Administration (FAA) National Plan of Integrated Airport Systems for 2017–2021, in which it is categorized as a local general aviation facility.

The airport is equipped with an AWOS III-PT which provides meteorological information to pilots and other interested parties.

== See also ==
- List of airports in New Hampshire
