= Alton Bay Seaplane Base =

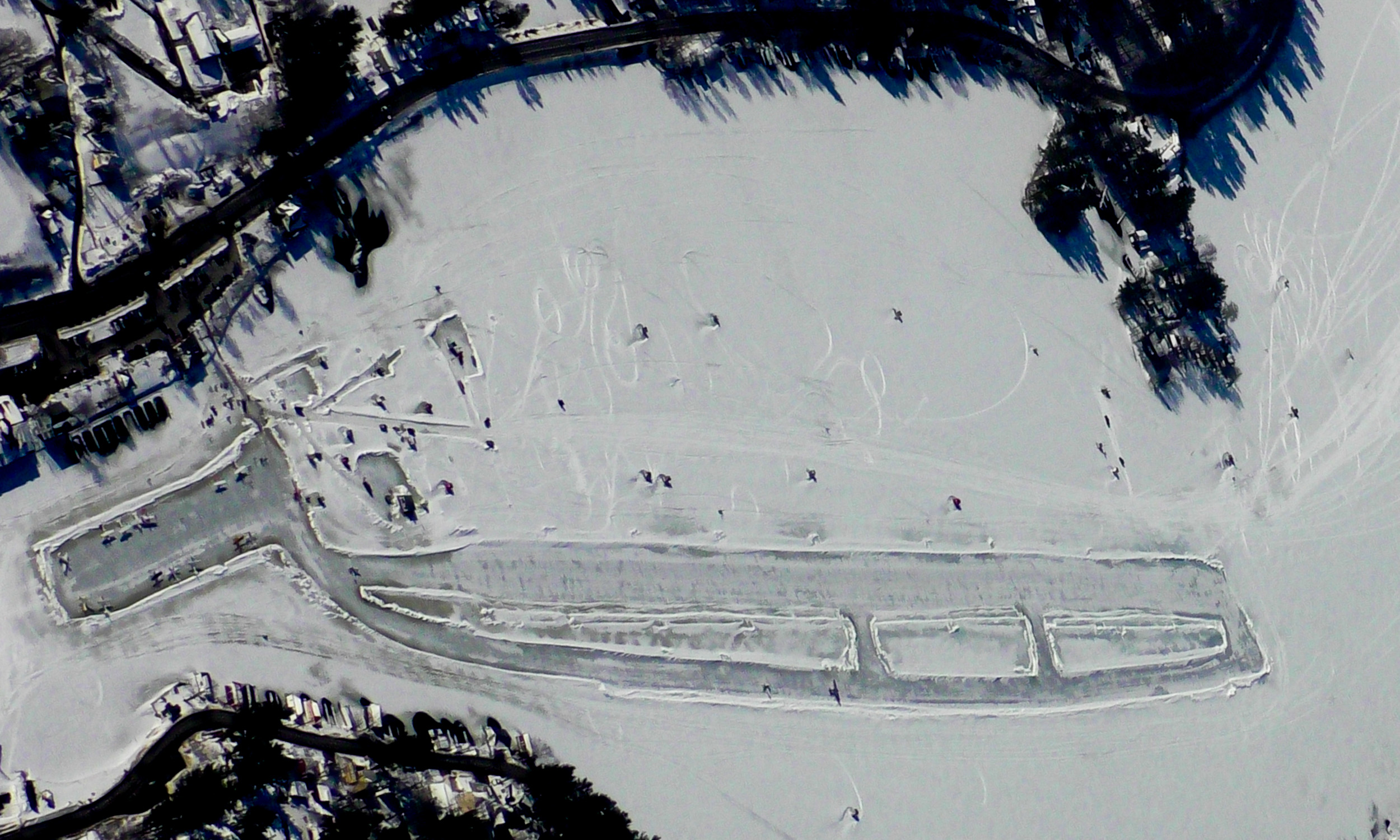
- IATA: none; ICAO: none; FAA LID: B18

Summary
- Airport type: Public
- Owner: State of New Hampshire
- Serves: Alton Bay, New Hampshire
- Elevation AMSL: 504 ft (154 m)
- Coordinates: 43°28′39″N 071°14′13″W
- Website: Official website

Map
- Interactive map of Alton Bay Seaplane Base

Runways
Direction	Length		Surface
Direction	ft	m	Surface
1/19	2,600	792	Water / Ice

Statistics (2011)
- Aircraft operations: 600
- Source: Federal Aviation Administration

Alton Bay Seaplane Base (FAA LID: B18) is a state-owned, public-use seaplane base located in a cove of Lake Winnipesaukee. The base is two nautical miles (4 km) north of the central business district of Alton Bay, in Belknap County, New Hampshire, United States.

== Facilities and aircraft ==
Alton Bay Seaplane Base has one seaplane landing area designated 1/19 and measuring 2,600 x 100 feet (792 x 30 m). For the 12-month period ending 31 December 2011, the airport had 600 general aviation aircraft operations, an average of 50 per month.

During the winter months, the base may seasonally open an ice runway instead of the normal seaplane landing area. This is the only FAA approved ice runway in the contiguous United States. The earliest the ice runway has opened is January 10. It is required to close no later than March 15.

== See also ==
- List of airports in New Hampshire
