= Parlin Field =

- IATA: NWH; ICAO: none; FAA LID: 2B3

Summary
- Airport type: Public
- Owner: Town of Newport
- Serves: Newport, New Hampshire
- Elevation AMSL: 784 ft / 239 m
- Coordinates: 43°23′17.27″N 072°11′21.32″W
- Website: Official website

Map
- Interactive map of Parlin Field

Runways
Direction	Length		Surface
Direction	ft	m	Surface
18/36	3,450	1,052	Asphalt
12/30	1,950	594	Turf

Statistics (2008)
- Aircraft operations: 2,901
- Based aircraft: 23
- Source: Federal Aviation Administration

Parlin Field (IATA: NWH, FAA LID: 2B3) is a public use airport in Sullivan County, New Hampshire, United States. It is owned by the Town of Newport and located two nautical miles (3.74 km) north of its central business district. It is included in the Federal Aviation Administration (FAA) National Plan of Integrated Airport Systems for 2017–2021, in which it is categorized as a local general aviation facility.

Although most U.S. airports use the same three-letter location identifier for the FAA and IATA, this airport is assigned 2B3 by the FAA, but has the designation NWH from the IATA.

== Facilities and aircraft ==
Parlin Field covers an area of 125 acres (51 ha) at an elevation of 784 feet (239 m) above mean sea level. It has two runways: 18/36 with an asphalt surface measuring 3,450 by 50 feet (1,052 x 15 m) and 12/30 with a turf surface measuring 1,950 by 80 feet (594 x 24 m)

For the 12-month period ending August 31, 2008, the airport had 2,901 aircraft operations, an average of 8 per day: 100% general aviation with a few ultralights. At that time there were 23 aircraft based at this airport: 91% single-engine, 4% multi-engine and 4% ultralights.

== See also ==
- List of airports in New Hampshire
