= Lake Tarleton =

Lake in New Hampshire, United States

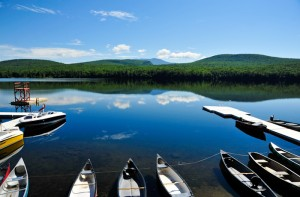

- Location within New Hampshire Location within the United States
- Location: Grafton County, New Hampshire
- Coordinates: 43°58′34″N 71°57′48″W
- Primary outflows: Eastman Brook
- Basin countries: United States
- Max. length: 1.7 mi (2.7 km)
- Max. width: 0.5 mi (0.80 km)
- Surface area: 334 acres (1.35 km^{2})
- Average depth: 28 ft (8.5 m)
- Max. depth: 66 ft (20 m)
- Surface elevation: 1,315 ft (401 m)
- Settlements: Piermont; Warren

Lake Tarleton is a 334-acre (1.35 km^{2}) water body located in Grafton County on the western edge of the White Mountains in New Hampshire, United States. The lake is located in the towns of Piermont and Warren. Water from Lake Tarleton flows via Eastman Brook west to the Connecticut River.

Kingswood Camp for Boys is located on the lake. The Appalachian Trail runs nearby on Mount Mist, then continues north to Mount Moosilauke, with both mountains overlooking the lake.

The lake is classified as a cold- and warmwater fishery, with observed species including rainbow trout, brown trout, lake trout, smallmouth bass, chain pickerel, and horned pout.

Lake Tarleton State Park offers an unguarded swimming beach and opportunities for swimming, canoeing and fishing.

== See also ==
- List of lakes in New Hampshire
