= Dean Memorial Airport =

Airport in New Hampshire, U.S.

- IATA: none; ICAO: none; FAA LID: 5B9

Summary
- Airport type: Public
- Owner: Town of Haverhill
- Serves: Haverhill, New Hampshire
- Elevation AMSL: 582 ft (177 m)
- Coordinates: 44°04′48.62″N 072°00′27.94″W
- Website: Dean Memorial Airport Website

Map
- Interactive map of Dean Memorial Airport

Runways
Direction	Length		Surface
Direction	ft	m	Surface
01/19	2,511	765	Asphalt

Statistics (2008)
- Aircraft operations: 4,750
- Based aircraft: 19
- Source: Federal Aviation Administration

Dean Memorial Airport is a public use airport in Grafton County, New Hampshire, United States. It is owned by the town of Haverhill and is located three nautical miles (5.56 km) northeast of the central business district. It is included in the Federal Aviation Administration (FAA) National Plan of Integrated Airport Systems for 2017–2021, in which it is categorized as a basic general aviation facility.

Although most U.S. airports use the same three-letter location identifier for the FAA and IATA, this airport is assigned 5B9 by the FAA but has no designation from the IATA.

== Facilities and aircraft ==
Dean Memorial Airport covers an area of 48 acres (19 ha) at an elevation of 582 feet (177 m) above mean sea level. It has one runway designated 01/19 with an asphalt surface measuring 2,511 by 58 feet (765 x 18 m).

For the 12-month period ending July 31, 2008, the airport had 4,750 aircraft operations, an average of 13 per day: 100% general aviation. At that time there were 19 aircraft based at this airport: 95% single-engine, and 5% helicopter.

== See also ==
- List of airports in New Hampshire
