= Jaffrey Airport–Silver Ranch =

- IATA: AFN; ICAO: KAFN; FAA LID: AFN

Summary
- Airport type: Public
- Owner: Jaffrey Municipal Airport Development Corp.
- Serves: Jaffrey, New Hampshire
- Elevation AMSL: 1,040 ft (320 m)
- Coordinates: 42°48′18.483″N 072°00′10.879″W
- Website: www.silverranchairpark.com

Map
- Interactive map of Jaffrey Airport–Silver Ranch

Runways
Direction	Length		Surface
Direction	ft	m	Surface
16/34	2,982	909	asphalt / turf

Statistics (2013)
- Aircraft operations: 7,300
- Based aircraft: 17
- Source: Federal Aviation Administration

Jaffrey Airport–Silver Ranch is a public use airport in Cheshire County, New Hampshire, United States. It is owned by the Jaffrey Municipal Airport Development Corp. and is located one nautical mile (1.85 km) southeast of the central business district of Jaffrey, New Hampshire. It is included in the Federal Aviation Administration (FAA) National Plan of Integrated Airport Systems for 2017–2021, in which it is categorized as a general aviation facility.

== Facilities and aircraft ==
Jaffrey Airport – Silver Ranch covers an area of 80 acres (32 ha) at an elevation of 1,040 feet (317 m) above mean sea level. It has one asphalt / turf runway designated 16/34 with a surface measuring 2,982 by 134 feet (909 x 41 m).

For the 12-month period ending 31 December 2013, the airport had 7,300 aircraft operations, an average of 20 per day: 86% general aviation, 12% air taxi, and 1% military. At that time there were 17 aircraft based at this airport: 65% single-engine, 6% multi-engine, 12% helicopters and 18% ultralights.

== See also ==
- List of airports in New Hampshire
