= Public transportation in Maine =

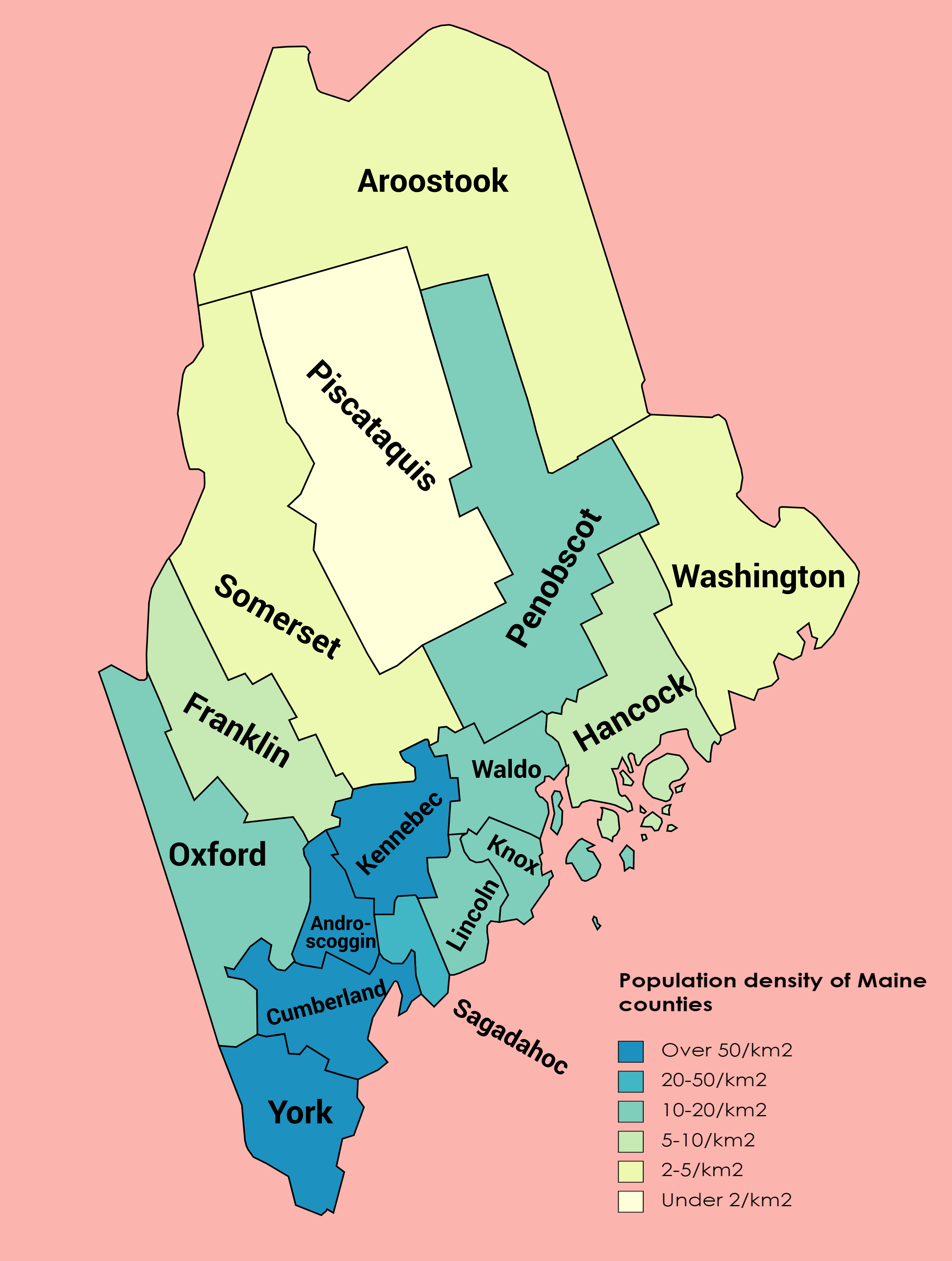
- A map of the population density of Maine's sixteen counties (2020)

Overview
- Transit type: Air, rail, road, water

Public transportation in Maine is available for all four main modes of transport—air, bus, ferry and rail—assisting residents and visitors to travel around much of Maine's 31,000 square miles (80,000 km^{2}).

The Maine Department of Transportation (MDOT) has broken down the state's sixteen counties into eight regions:

- Aroostook County (including parts of Washington County and Patten in Penobscot County)
- Penobscot County (excluding Patten) and Piscataquis County
- Kennebec County and Somerset County
- Hancock County (including Isle au Haut in Knox County and Washington County, excluding Danforth)
- Androscoggin County, Franklin County and Oxford County (excluding Brownfield, Denmark, Fryeburg, Hiram, Lovell, Porter, Stoneham, Stow and Sweden)
- Knox County (excluding Isle au Haut), Lincoln County, Sagadahoc County and Waldo County (plus Brunswick and Harpswell in Cumberland County)
- Cumberland County (excluding Brunswick and Harpswell)
- York County (and Brownfield, Denmark, Fryeburg, Hiram, Lovell, Porter, Stoneham, Stow and Sweden in Oxford County)

Each of the eight regions has one designated regional transportation provider for local residents to travel at no (or a low) cost. These include Aroostook Regional Transportation System (ARTS) and Cumberland County Regional Transportation Program (RTP).

Of the three northern New England states, Maine (as of 2021) receives the least amount of federal funding for its operational needs. In 2019, for example, it was given $2.3 million, 18% of its operating expenses. In early 2023, it was announced that southern Maine would receive $8 million in American Rescue Plan funds to increase bus-service frequency and improve accessibility at bus stops. In late 2023, it was reported that Maine could receive, over five years, around $250 million under the federal Bipartisan Infrastructure Law to improve public transportation.

As of 2025, eleven operators provide bus and coach services in Maine, the largest being Greater Portland Metro. Concord Coach Lines, Greyhound and Cyr Bus Line offer inter-city connections.

Maine is home to six commercial airports: Portland International Jetport, Bangor International, Knox County Regional, Presque Isle International, Hancock County–Bar Harbor and Augusta State.

Ferry routes are prevalent between downtown Portland and the main islands of Casco Bay, such as Peaks Island, via the fleet of Casco Bay Lines. Passage to Canada is available on The Cat, which runs between Nova Scotia and Bar Harbor. The Maine State Ferry Service serves (from Rockland) Vinalhaven, North Haven and Matinicus Isle; (from Lincolnville) Isleboro; and (from Bass Harbor) Swan's Island and Frenchboro.

According to U.S. News & World Report, Maine is ranked 19th in public transit usage and 43rd in transportation infrastructure.

In 2025, it was reported by the Maine Public Transit Advisory Council (PTAC) that the state is meeting 11% of its "demonstrated need for public transportation." The council asked for increased state operating funding for expanded transit systems and services, saying Maine needs to match the need. Later in the year, Maine lawmakers were looking at options to improve the state's transportation options, including a bill which would improve the coordination of community transportation, especially for those reliant on other people for mobility.

== Environmental aspect ==
Environmentally, personal cars, pick-up trucks and other gasoline-dependent vehicles account for over half of Maine's gas emissions, while the contribution from buses is less than 1% of annual vehicle travel within the state.

In 2023, Proterra, the manufacturer of electric buses in southern Maine, filed for bankruptcy.

== Air ==
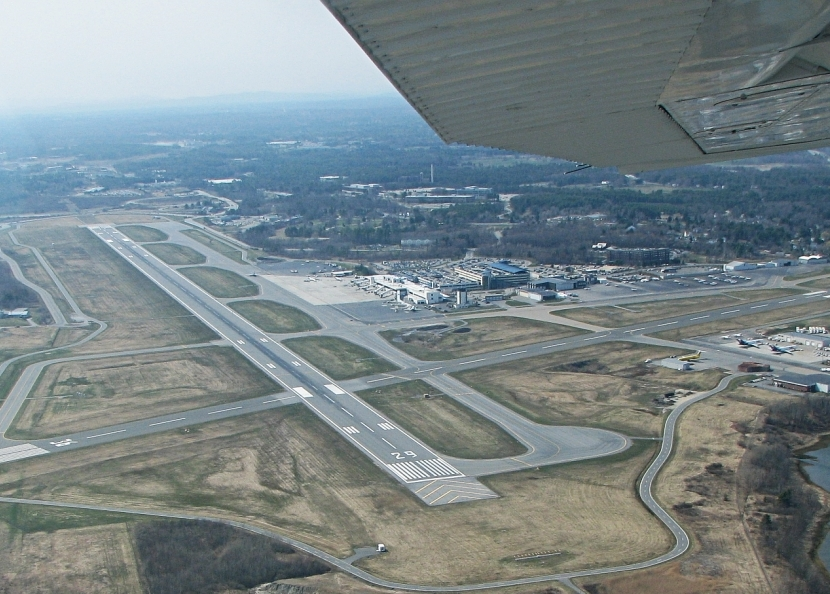
Portland International Jetport in 2008

There are six airports in Maine which offer scheduled passenger services on commercial airlines (listed in order of enplanements):

- Portland International Jetport, Portland
- Bangor International Airport, Bangor
- Knox County Regional Airport, Owls Head
- Presque Isle International Airport, Presque Isle
- Hancock County–Bar Harbor Airport, Trenton
- Augusta State Airport, Augusta

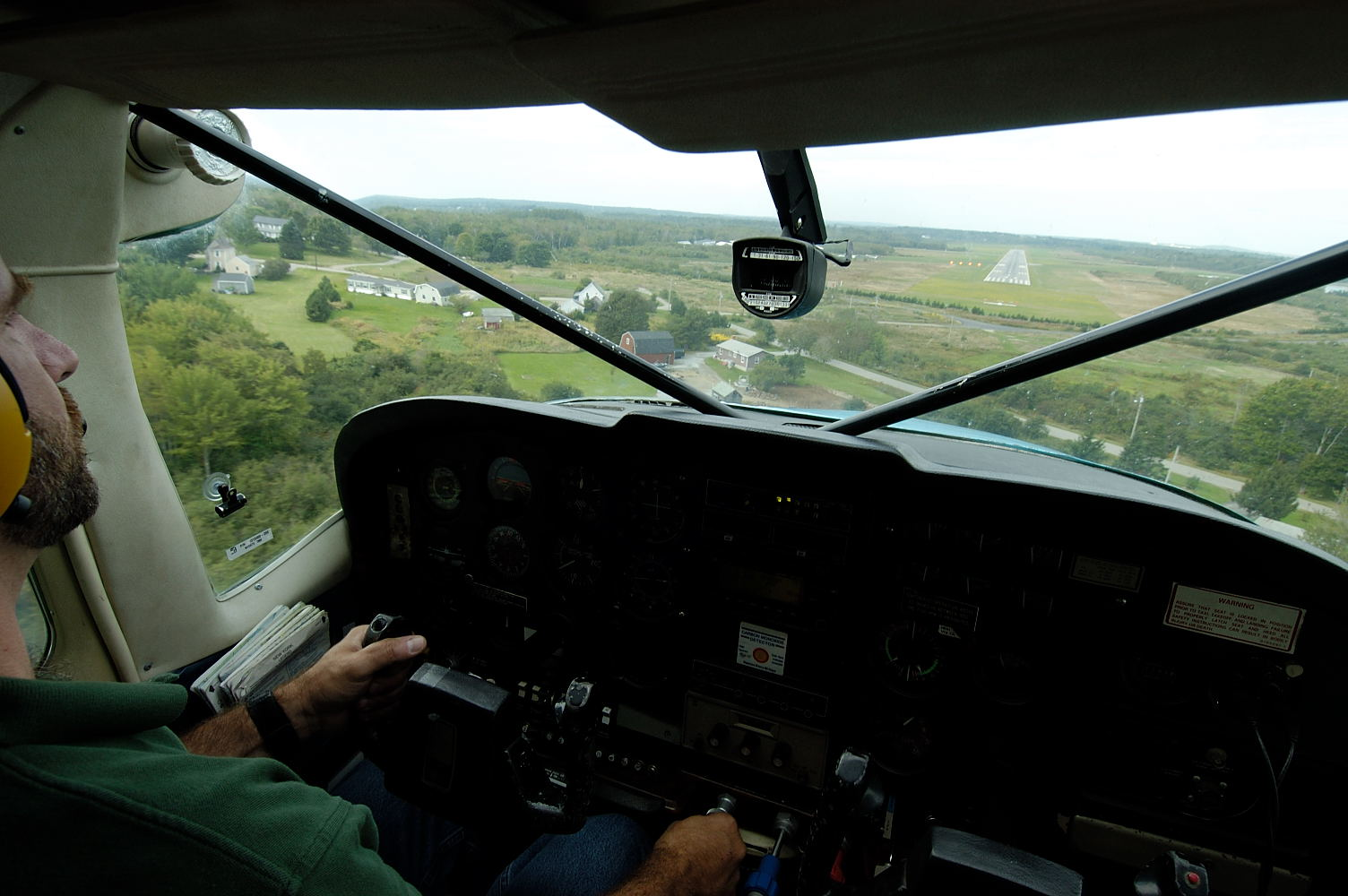
On approach for runway 13 at Knox County Regional Airport

Portland International Jetport (ICAO airport code: KPWM) is served by eight airlines year-round: American Airlines, American Eagle, Breeze Airways, Delta Air Lines, Delta Connection, Southwest Airlines, United Airlines and United Express. With the exception of Delta Connection, each offers additional seasonal services, alongside JetBlue and Sun Country Airlines. The seven most popular routes from Portland are Southwest's service to Baltimore/Washington International (151,000 passengers between September 2022 and August 2023), Delta Connections' service to New York–LaGuardia, United's service to Newark Liberty, American and United's services to Chicago O'Hare, American Airlines' service to Ronald Reagan Washington National, American Airlines' service to Charlotte Douglas International and Delta Air Lines' service to Hartsfield–Jackson Atlanta International (83,000 passengers between September 2022 and August 2023).

Outside of Portland, the next most popular route is Delta Air Lines' service from Bangor International (KBGR) to LaGuardia, American Airlines' service to Washington National and American Airlines' service to Philadelphia International.

Owls Head's Knox County Regional Airport (KRKD) was built during World War II. It was later taken over by the town, then by Knox County.

Around 13,000 passengers annually fly out of Presque Isle International Airport (KPQI), mostly on United's flights to Providence International Airport and Newark Liberty International Airport.

Cape Air flies between Hancock County–Bar Harbor Regional Airport (KBHB) and Boston Logan. It also services Augusta State Airport (KAUG), with a service connecting passengers with JetBlue at Logan.

== Bus ==
As of 2015, almost 75% of Mainers dependent upon public transport lived in areas without a bus service. Washington County, for example, does not have a comprehensive public transportation system, despite having a year-round population of around 32,000.

There are sixteen local public transportation providers, of which seven are in rural locations.

=== Local ===
Local bus services include Biddeford Saco Old Orchard Beach Transit, Brunswick Link, Community Connector, Cooperative Alliance for Seacoast Transportation, Greater Portland Metro, Island Explorer, Lewiston-Auburn CityLink and Sanford Transit. South Portland Bus Service merged with Greater Portland Metro in late 2024.

==== Biddeford Saco Old Orchard Beach Transit ====
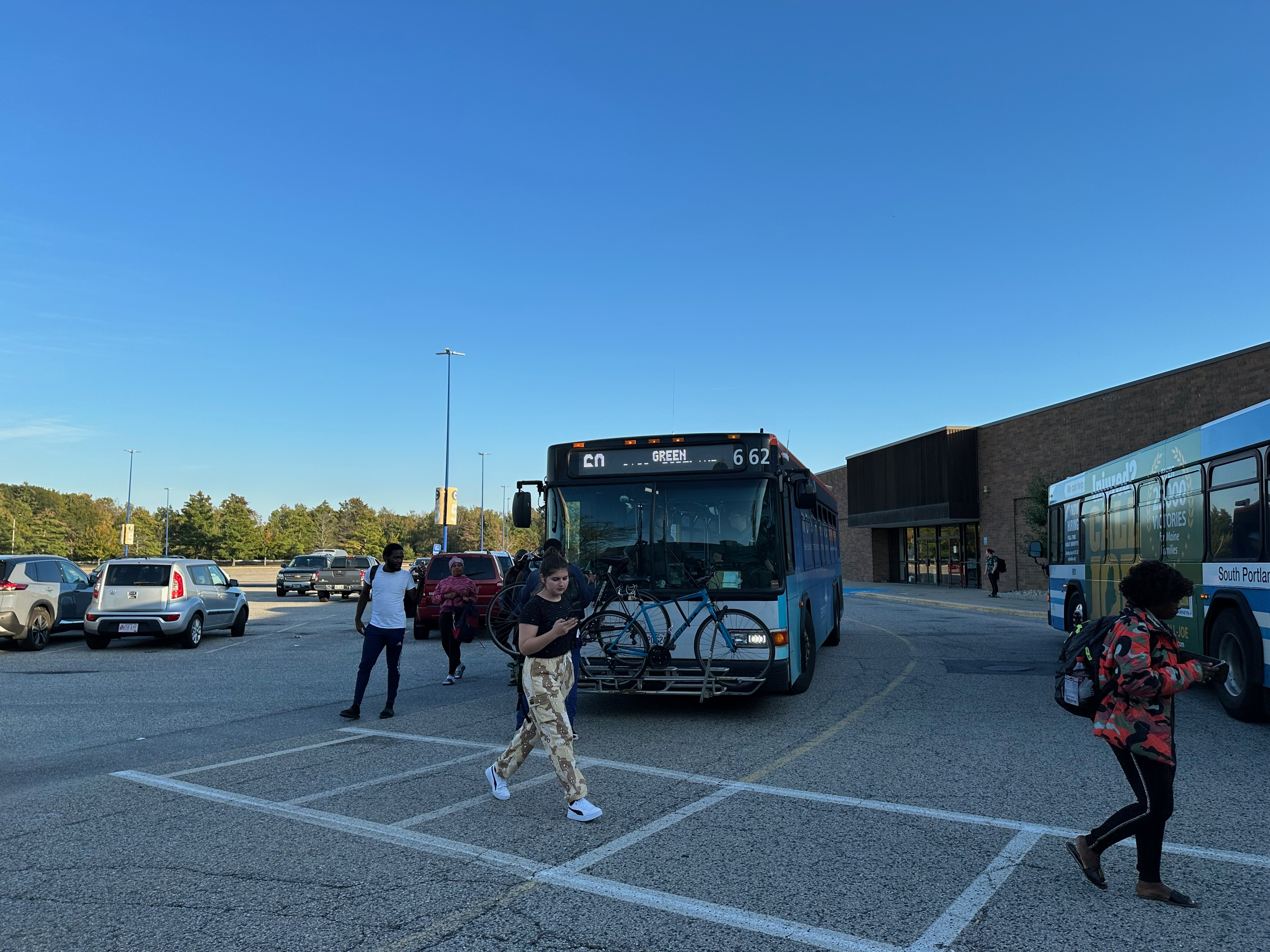
BSOOB's number 60 at The Maine Mall (2023)

Although its name only lists three towns, the BSOOB also serves Scarborough, South Portland and Portland via the number 60 Green line. There are eight year-round routes and three seasonal ones. The terminal for each route, except the number 70 Zoom Turnpike Express, is the Saco Transportation Center, from which connections to Amtrak's Downeaster can be made.

==== Brunswick Link ====
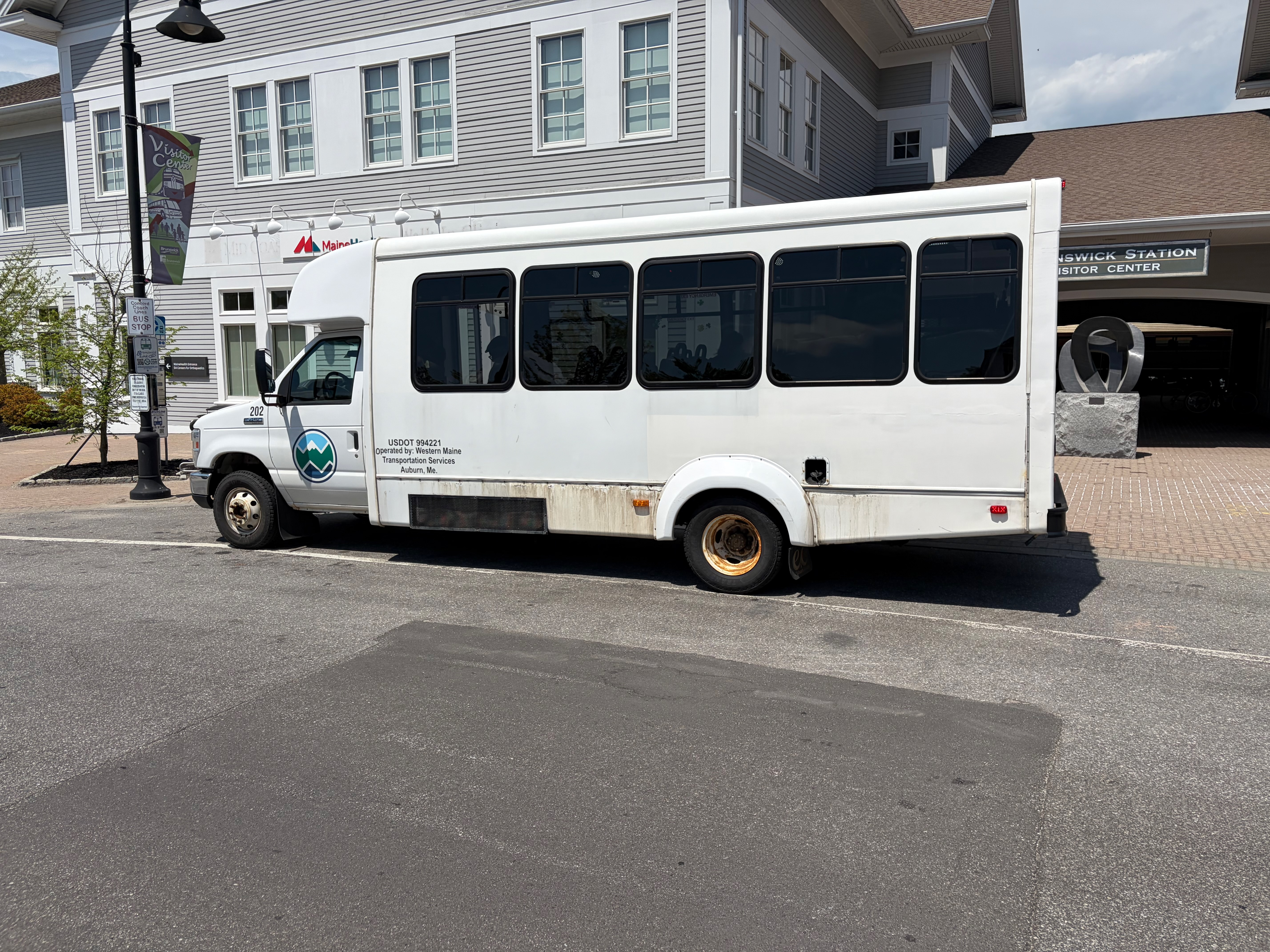
A Western Maine Transportation bus at Brunswick station

Formerly the flex-route Brunswick Explorer, the service was relaunched in 2021 as a fixed-route version. The service is run by Western Maine Transportation Services (WMTS) and has 27 stops. The route begins hourly from Brunswick's Amtrak station and connects to the BlueLine Commuter service and the Metro BREEZ express bus to and from Portland. WMTS operates several small commuter buses which serve Androscoggin, Franklin and Oxford counties: the Lewiston-Auburn Citylink, the GreenLine Commuter (Farmington to Lewiston-Auburn), Lisbon Connection (Lisbon Falls to Lewiston), BlueLine Express (for employees of Bath Iron Works traveling from Lewiston), BlueLine Commuter (Lewiston-Auburn to Bath), a Farmington-Rangeley route (once per month), GreenLine Connection (Canton, Peru, Mexico and Rumford) and Bath CityBus (see below).

In September 2023, a contribution of $17,500 from the Immigrant Resource Center of Maine allowed the service to waive fares for six months.

==== Community Connector ====
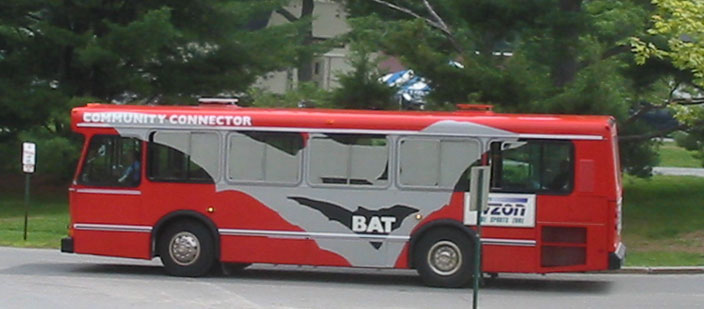
The BAT Community Connector at the University of Maine

Formerly known as the BAT Community Connector, it serves Bangor and outlying towns such as Veazie, Orono, Old Town, Brewer and Hampden.

Between January and March 2026, ridership on buses around Bangor increased by 21%. This was largely due to the cost of fuel, which was over $4 per gallon at the time. Bus fares in Bangor have been $1.50 since 2014, but will increase to $2 in 2027.

==== Cooperative Alliance for Seacoast Transportation ====
Although based in Dover, New Hampshire, Cooperative Alliance for Seacoast Transportation (COAST) serves southern Maine. Route number 1 ends in Berwick, while the Clipper Connection (express) route 100 serves Eliot.

==== Greater Portland Metro ====
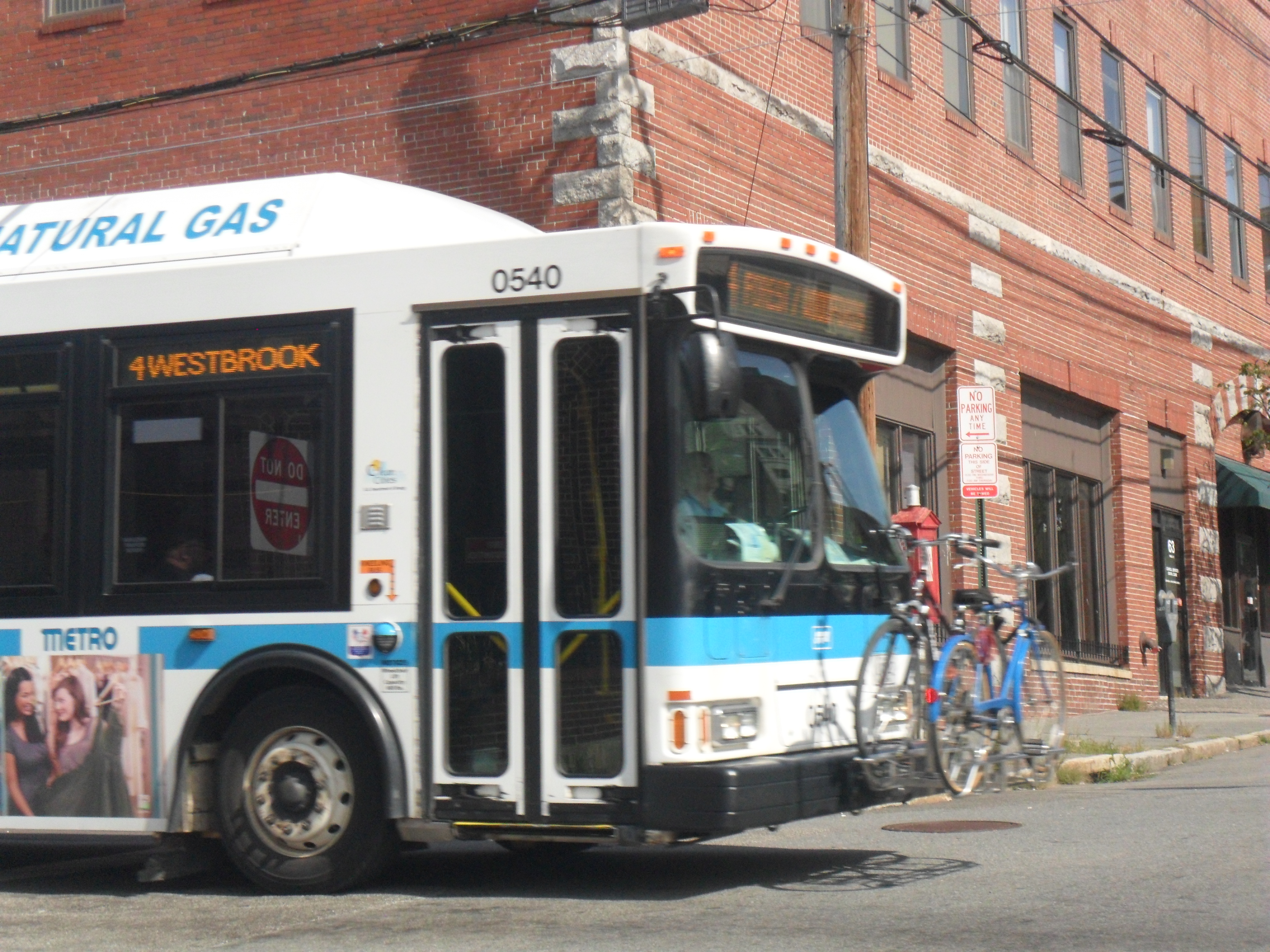
A Greater Portland Metro bus en route to Westbrook (route number 4) in 2010

Established in 1966, Greater Portland Metro is the state's largest transportation agency. It has two hubs: one on Elm Street (known as METRO Pulse) in downtown Portland and one in Westbrook. The Portland Transportation Center, at Thompson's Point, is a major transfer point (and the origin of route number 1 and the Metro BREEZ express service), where connections can be made to the Downeaster train, to Concord Coach Lines buses and to other local bus routes. Services from York County and from the South Portland Bus Service connect to the Metro at The Maine Mall in South Portland and along Congress Street.

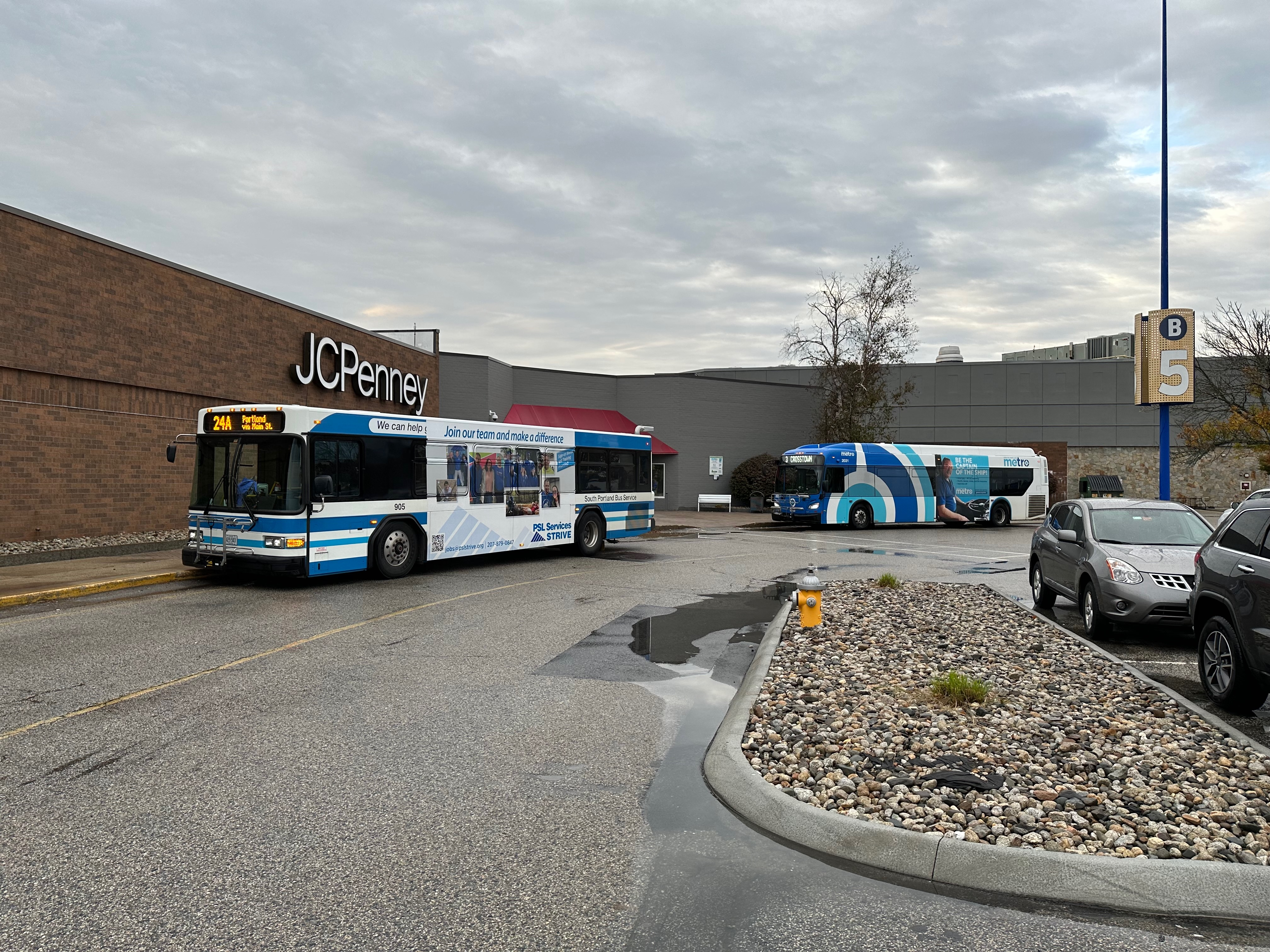
The now-defunct South Portland Bus Service running the route 24A, in front of Greater Portland Metro's route 3 (Westbrook Crosstown), at The Maine Mall (2023)

Greater Portland Metro runs fifteen routes: route 1 serves Congress Street (from Portland Transportation Center to Munjoy Hill); route 2 runs along Forest Avenue to Pride's Corner; route 3 ("Crosstown") takes passengers from The Maine Mall to Hannaford Riverton; route 4 also serves Westbrook, but begins at METRO Pulse; route 5 runs from Pulse to The Maine Mall via the Portland International Jetport; route 7, known as the Falmouth Flyer, runs from Pulse to Falmouth's WalMart. Route 8 is known as the Peninsula Loop (running between Hannaford on Preble Street and Whole Foods Market via downtown Portland). It currently runs counter-clockwise around the peninsula, but there are discussions about introducing an additional clockwise route. Route 9 is split into two parts: 9A serves North Deering via Stevens Avenue, while 9B serves North Deering via Washington Avenue. In December 2024, South Portland Bus Service merged with Metro, with Metro inheriting three of its routes: route 21 (which runs from Forest Avenue at Congress Street in downtown Portland to Willard Square/Southern Maine Community College (SMCC)), route 24A (which serves Walmart and The Maine Mall via Main Street) and the 24B (which also serves the mall, but runs via the Community Center). University of Southern Maine's Portland and Gorham campuses are served by the Husky Line (H). Finally, the Metro BREEZ is an express service which runs, thirteen times on weekdays and six times on Saturday, from Thompson's Point to Bowdoin College in Brunswick.

Greater Portland Metro successfully applied for $4 million in American Rescue Plan Act (ARPA) funding through Greater Portland Council of Governments. They used the money for bus stop improvements, transit signal priority and a reduced-fare promotion, as well as a pilot “Microtransit” program. The funding will cushion the blow expected to be felt when federal COVID-19 funding (via the CARES Act) expired in 2024.

==== Island Explorer ====
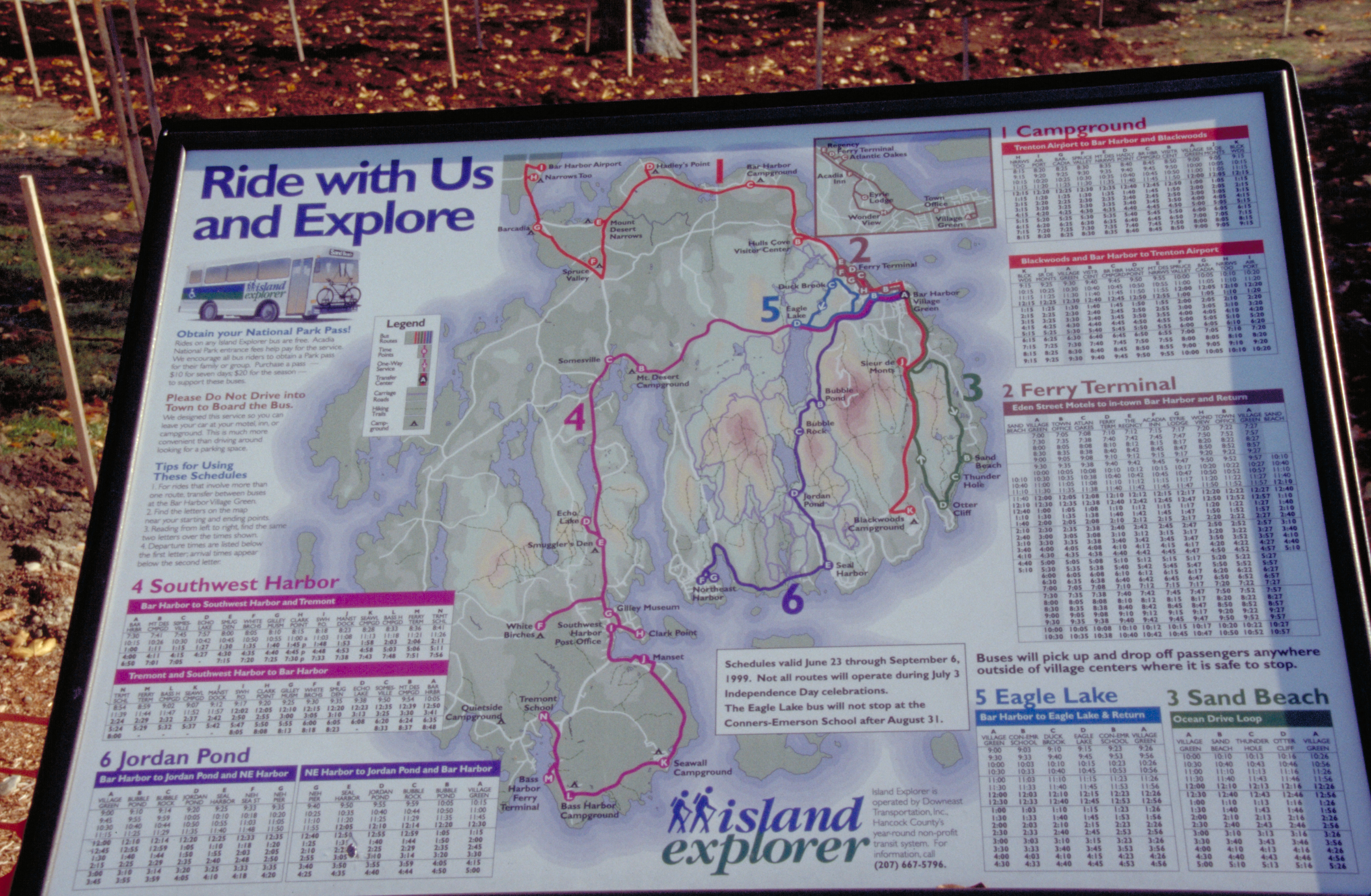
Map of the Island Explorer route

The Island Explorer, operated by Ellsworth-based Downeast Transportation, is a seasonal (June to October) service in Down East Maine. With a fleet of 32 buses, it has eight routes: "commute to Bar Harbor" routes (from Bangor, Brewer, Franklin, Milbridge and Ellsworth) to Jackson Laboratory; Bar Harbor to Bangor; Bar Harbor to Ellsworth; Bucksport Shuttle; Ellsworth Shuttle; Bar Harbor Shuttle; Stonington to Ellsworth; and Ellsworth to Blue Hill. Downeast Transportation was awarded a $23 million grant in 2024 to replace its propane-running fleet with electric versions. The 23 buses are expected to be delivered in 2027 or 2028.

In 2023, a pilot program which introduced electric buses to the routes began. The same year, construction began in Trenton on the Acadia Gateway Center, a hub for bus transportation to and from Mount Desert Island. Visitors can park their personal vehicles (and, if necessary, charge them) and take public transportation onto the island. It will reduce overcrowding on the island's roads during peak seasons.

==== Lewiston-Auburn CityLink ====
Established in 1976, the CityLink runs nine weekday-only routes: Main Street, Sabattus Street, Lisbon Street, New Auburn, Minot Avenue, College Street, Auburn Mall, downtown and Central Maine Community College (CMCC).

==== Others ====
West Bus Services, based in Milbridge, serves several communities in northern Maine. The daily Coastal Connection route serves: Calais, Perry, Pembroke, Dennysville, Whiting, Lubec, East Machias, Machias, Jonesboro, Jonesport, Beals, Addison, Cherryfield, Columbia, Columbia Falls, Deblois (seasonal), Township 18 (seasonal), Township 19 (seasonal), Centerville, Gouldsboro, Winter Harbor, Sullivan, Steuben, Hancock, Ellsworth, Lucern, Holden and Bangor. The route takes around 3.5 hours. On the first Wednesday of each month, a return service runs between Lubec and Machias.

Sanford Transit, run by York Community Action Corporation (which is partially funded by the Federal Transit Administration and the Maine DOT), provides year-round service from Springvale to South Sanford. Their Orange Line service operates between Sanford and Wells, providing connections to the Downeaster. The KITT (Kennebunk In-Town Transportation) serves Kennebunk on Tuesdays only. The Southern Maine Connector runs from Springvale to Saco seven days a week, connecting to the Downeaster. The Shoreline Connector, part of the Shoreline Explorer Network, offers seasonal trolley services from York to Lower Village, Kennebunk, via the Blue Line.

The Kennebec Explorer by Kennebec Valley Community Action Program. KVCAP is a regional transportation corporation serving central Maine since 1976. Its main route is an inter-city service between Augusta, the state's capital, and Waterville. It runs six times from Augusta and seven times from Waterville. In 2023, KVCAP received a federal grant (from MDOT) in excess of $650,000 "to help improve the scheduling and planning software that ensures efficiency in scheduling over 1,000 trips a day." Grants are limited to capital improvements; they do not go toward hiring new drivers. Penquis Valley Community Action Program received the same funding. It primarily serves Penobscot, Piscataquis and Knox counties.

The Augusta Explorer runs twice each weekday between Gardiner and downtown Augusta.

The Bath CityBus has two loops: a North Loop (nine services), which runs between Bath's City Hall and Patten Free Library via Congress Avenue, and South Loop (eight services), which also departs from City Hall but serves Bath's Shopping Centre and the Maine Maritime Museum. It runs on weekdays only.

MidCoast Public Transportation's Rockland Downtown Area Shuttle (DASH) runs eight times each weekday between Rockland's Rankin Center and Hannaford, while its Belfast DASH runs seven times each weekday between Belfast's Volunteers of America and Wight Street.

The Lake Region Explorer serves U.S. Route 302 between Bridgton and Portland seven days a week.

=== Inter-city ===
There are three main inter-city bus services: Concord Coach Lines, Greyhound and Metro BREEZ.

Concord Coach Lines serves the following towns and cities in Maine, utilizing Interstate 95 (from north to south):

- Orono (University of Maine)
- Bangor
- Searsport
- Belfast
- Lincolnville
- Camden/Rockport
- Rockland
- Waldoboro
- Damariscotta
- Wiscasset
- Bath
- Brunswick (Bowdoin College)
- Waterville (Colby College)
- Augusta
- Portland

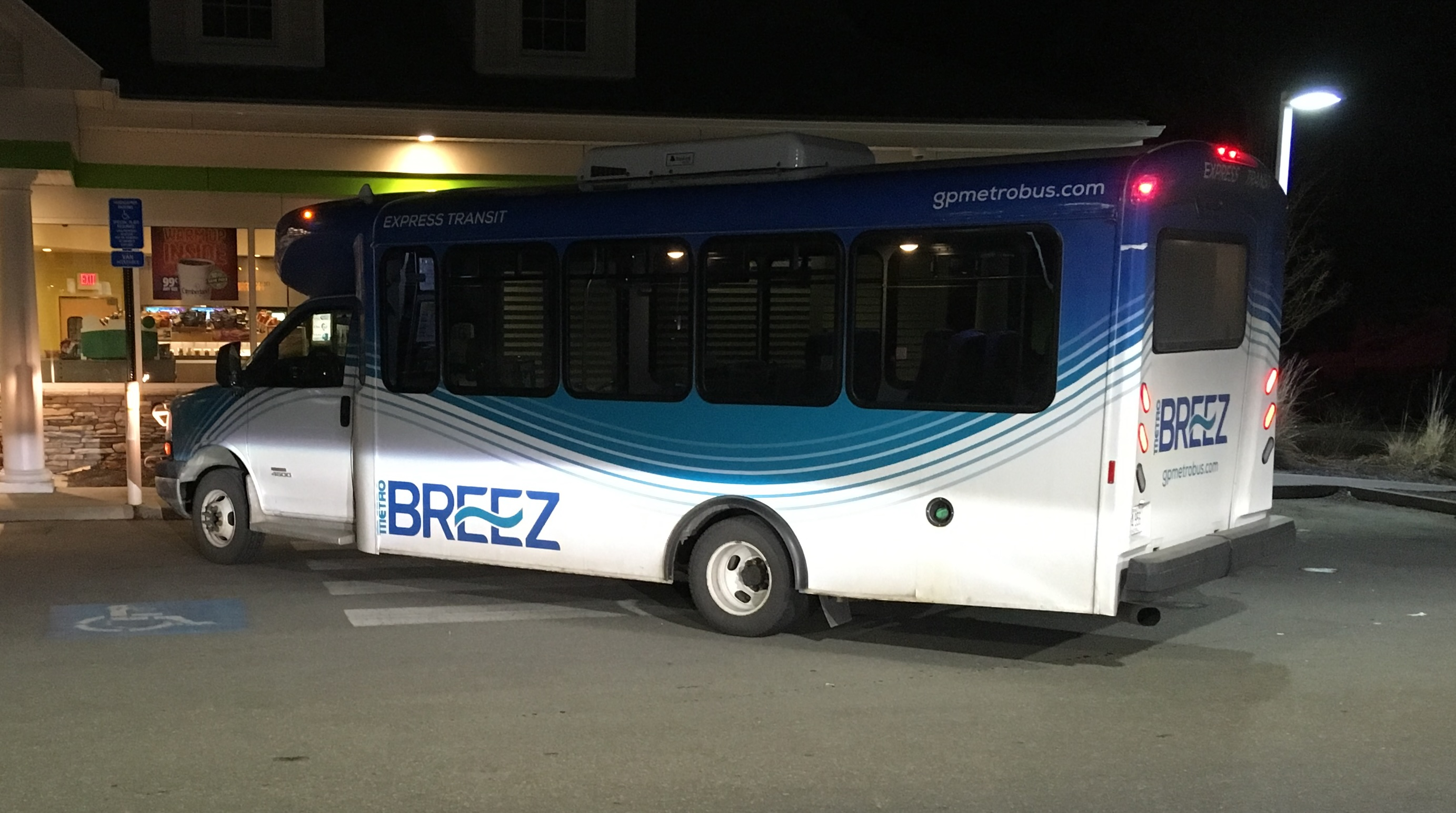
An early Metro BREEZ bus; larger buses are now used

Greyhound buses in Maine originate from Bangor, Lewiston and Portland. Portland's Greyhound station was formerly located at the intersection of St. John Street and Congress Street. The building, constructed in 1961, closed in 2019, after 32 years of ownership by Greyhound. Buses now depart from the park and ride lot on Marginal Way. Popular Greyhound destinations from Maine include Boston, New York and Washington, D.C.

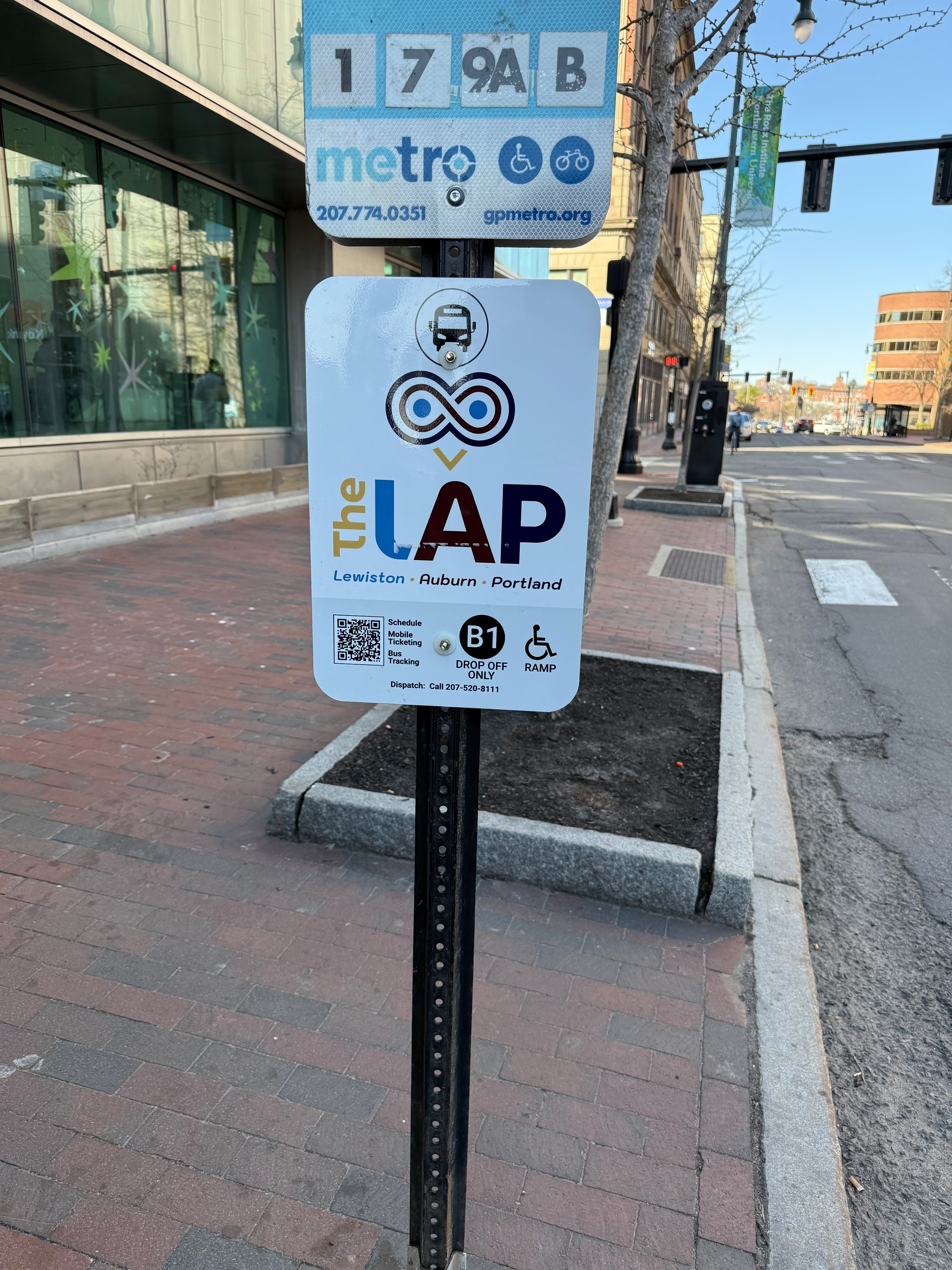
Sign for the Lewiston-Auburn-Portland (LAP) bus at Portland Public Library

Greater Portland Metro's BREEZ express bus runs thirteen times on weekdays and six times on Saturdays between Portland and Brunswick. It stops in Portland, Yarmouth, Freeport and Brunswick. The service was established in 2016, after a successful pilot project, via an Act of the 129th Maine Legislature. Its long-term potential was to reduce congestion on Interstate 295, on which the service runs for part of its route. The route initially ran between Portland and Freeport, but was expanded to Brunswick in 2017. Falmouth was removed from the route around the same time; this route was already served by the route 7 Falmouth Flyer.

Cyr Bus Line, a subsidiary of John T. Cyr & Sons, Inc. and based in Old Town, was founded in 1912. It operates tours and charters throughout the country and into Canada. Some of its destinations include Lexington, Kentucky; Myrtle Beach, South Carolina; Niagara Falls and Lancaster County, Pennsylvania.

In 2024, MaineDOT discussed beginning a pilot program of a bus service between Portland and Lewiston–Auburn, with potential stops occurring at Bates College, Oak Street bus station, Auburn Transportation Center, the exit 75 park and ride in Auburn, Monument Square in Portland, and Portland Transportation Center. The service would run between 4.30am and midnight on weekdays and 6 AM to 9.30 PM on weekends. The route, named The LAP (Lewiston-Auburn-Portland), was confirmed in June 2024, and started the following month. It will be provided by RTW Management Inc. of Utah.

== Ferry ==
There are three main ferry services: Bay Ferries, Casco Bay Lines (including the mailboat) and Maine State Ferry Service.

=== Bay Ferries ===
A high-speed catamaran ferry, known as The Cat, runs between Nova Scotia and Bar Harbor. The route resumed in 2022, after a break of twelve years. It served a Nova Scotia-to-Portland route for ten years previously.

=== Casco Bay Lines ===
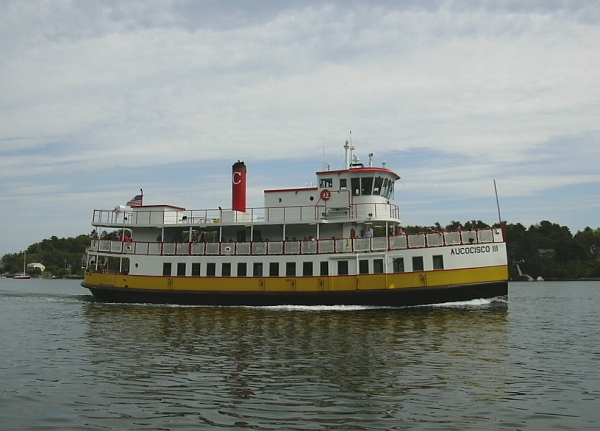
A Casco Bay Lines ferry

Established in 1919, Casco Bay Lines serves several islands in Casco Bay from the Maine State Pier at the foot of Franklin Street. They are Peaks Island, Little Diamond Island, Great Diamond Island, Long Island, Chebeague Island and Cliff Island, with five vessels currently in operation: Aucocisco III, Maquoit II, Machigonne II, Bay Mist and Wabanaki. (Chebeague Island is also served by the Chebeague Island Ferry.)

The Peaks Island route runs fifteen times on Mondays and Tuesdays, and sixteen times on Wednesdays through Sundays, with a layover of thirty minutes after reaching the island. The last ferry departs Peaks at either 10:55 PM (Mondays and Tuesdays) or 11:55 PM (Wednesdays to Sundays). Vehicles are permitted on the ferry only at certain times on Mondays and Tuesdays but there are no restrictions for the rest of the week. Each island is served seven days a week, with frequency dependent upon the season.

The year-round Casco Bay Mailboat Run (aboard the Maquoit II) stops at five islands: Little Diamond, Great Diamond, Long, Cliff Island and Chebeague, on a route that takes around three hours. It is the longest-running mailboat service in the country, having been in existence since the 1870s. Up until the 1950s, the boat was coal-powered; now it runs on a diesel engine.

== Rail ==
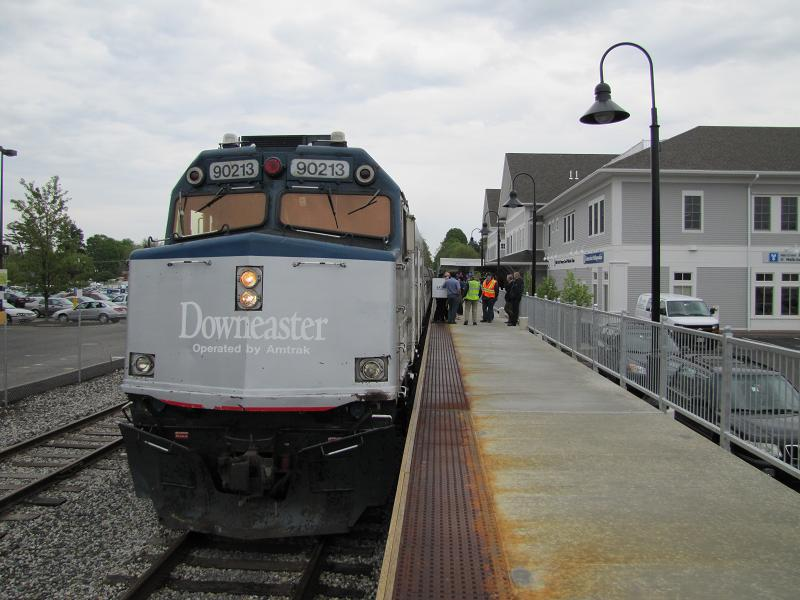
The Amtrak Downeaster at Brunswick station

Amtrak's Downeaster runs between Boston (North Station) and Brunswick. Its Maine stops are Brunswick, Freeport, Portland, Old Orchard Beach (seasonal), Saco, and Wells.

In 2024, discussions began once more to bring passenger rail service to central Maine, with Lewiston, Waterville and Bangor potentially being served. A joint proposal was filed with the Maine Legislature's Transportation Committee which would result in a $500,000 federal grant to study the pros and cons of the plan. In December 2023, the grant was given to the Northern New England Passenger Rail Authority, operators of the Downeaster, to study whether an extension of the service from Brunswick to Rockland was feasible.

== See also ==
- Portland Railroad Company
