= Scarborough Connector =

State highway in Cumberland County, Maine, US

- State Route 701
- Map of the South Portland and Scarborough area with the Scarborough Connector highlighted in red

Route information
- Maintained by MaineDOT
- Length: 1.77 mi (2.85 km)

Major junctions
- North end: I-295 / Broadway in South Portland
- South end: US 1 / SR 9 in Scarborough

Location
- Country: United States
- State: Maine
- County: Cumberland

Highway system
- Maine State Highway System; Interstate; US; State; Auto trails; Lettered highways
← I-495	→ SR 703

The Scarborough Connector, officially designated State Route 701, is a 1.77-mile (2.85 km) freeway located in southern Maine which connects U.S. Route 1 and State Route 9 in Scarborough to Interstate 295 in South Portland. The Scarborough Connector functions as part of a bypass of South Portland and as part of a connecting route between downtown Scarborough, The Maine Mall, and the Maine Turnpike (Interstate 95).

The SR 701 designation and direction are only indicated on mileposts, which increase from north to south as opposed to the standard practice of increasing from south to north. All other signage refers only to the other routes to which it connects (I-95, I-295 and US 1). In lieu of exit numbers, SR 701 has lettered interchanges that are only indicated on gore signs and exit ramp signs.

== Route description ==
The Scarborough Connector begins in the north as exit 2 from I-295 south in South Portland. Exit R, the only southbound exit, connects with the Maine Turnpike Approach Road (unsigned SR 703) eastbound, which provides a connection to US 1 north and downtown South Portland. The freeway crosses into Scarborough and continues south for 1.6 miles (2.6 km) before merging directly onto US 1 south / SR 9 west towards downtown. Traffic may use the nearby intersection at Hillcrest Avenue to change direction.

In the south, the Connector begins as a left exit from US 1 north / SR 9 east and heads due north. There are two exits in the northbound direction: Exit W leads to the Maine Turnpike Approach Road (unsigned SR 703) westbound, which leads to The Maine Mall and the Maine Turnpike (I-95), and exit M connects to Broadway in downtown South Portland. The freeway then merges directly onto I-295 north towards Portland.

Except at the southern end approaching US 1 / SR 9, the Scarborough Connector has a posted speed limit of 60 miles per hour (97 km/h).

== History ==
The Scarborough Connector was originally designated as an Inventory Road, #072037, without a numeric designation. The SR 701 designation was added later and the number posted on mileposts along the highway. The SR 701 designation officially terminates northbound at the Broadway interchange, but the Inventory Road designation extends an additional 0.57 miles (0.92 km) along the exit ramps connecting to I-295, bringing the road's overall length to 2.34 miles (3.77 km). However, SR 701 mileposts posted in the field include the mileage between I-295 and Broadway.

== Exit list ==
Exits are listed in order from north to south as mileposts increase in that direction. Although the SR 701 designation does not officially extend north of the Broadway interchange, posted mileposts indicate mileage from I-295. The entire route is in Cumberland County.

Location	mi	km	Exit	Destinations	Notes
South Portland	0.00	0.00		I-295 north – Portland	Northbound exit/southbound entrance, ramps between I-295 and Broadway designated as Inventory Road
South Portland	0.57 0.00	0.92 0.00	W	Broadway – South Portland	Northbound exit/southbound entrance, northern terminus of SR 701 designation
South Portland	0.65 0.08	1.05 0.13	M	To I-95 / Maine Turnpike (Maine Turnpike Approach) – Maine Mall Road, Jetport	Northbound exit and entrance, unsigned SR 703 west
South Portland	0.65 0.08	1.05 0.13	R	To US 1 (Maine Turnpike Approach) – Main Street, South Portland	Southbound exit and entrance, unsigned SR 703 east
Scarborough	2.34 1.77	3.77 2.85		US 1 south / SR 9 west – Scarborough, Old Orchard	Southern terminus, southbound exit/northbound entrance
1.000 mi = 1.609 km; 1.000 km = 0.621 mi: Incomplete access
