= Maine State Route 703 =

Road in South Portland, Maine, US

State Route 703
- Samantha Smith Way; Maine Turnpike Authority Approach Road
- Map of the South Portland and Scarborough area with SR 703 highlighted in red

Route information
- Maintained by MaineDOT
- Length: 1.91 mi (3.07 km)
- Existed: 2004–present

Major junctions
- West end: I-95 / Maine Turnpike in South Portland
- I-295 in South Portland
- East end: US 1 / SR 9 in South Portland

Location
- Country: United States
- State: Maine
- Counties: Cumberland

Highway system
- Maine State Highway System; Interstate; US; State; Auto trails; Lettered highways
← SR 701	→ US 1

State Route 703 (SR 703) is the designation of Samantha Smith Way, also called the Maine Turnpike Authority Approach Road, a 1.91-mile (3.07 km) road located in South Portland, Maine. It runs from southeast to northwest, connecting U.S. Route 1 and State Route 9 to the Maine Turnpike (Interstate 95) via Interstate 295 and The Maine Mall. Except at its endpoints, it is a four-lane freeway with a 55-mile-per-hour (89 km/h) speed limit.

The SR 703 designation and direction are only indicated on mileposts, which increase from east to west as opposed to the standard practice of increasing from west to east. All other signage refers only to the other routes to which it connects (I-95, I-295, US 1 and SR 114).

== Route description ==
SR 703 begins at an at-grade intersection with Main Street (US 1/SR 9) just north of the Scarborough town line. Heading westbound, the highway meets the northbound Scarborough Connector (unsigned SR 701) at Exit N, which further connects to I-295 north and Broadway. After crossing under I-295, Exit G connects directly to The Maine Mall via Philbrook Avenue. The highway terminates at a diamond interchange at the Maine Turnpike after traffic passes through an entrance toll. Traffic to I-95 north continues unimpeded while traffic to I-95 south must turn left at a signalized intersection.

Heading eastbound from I-95, exit J serves The Maine Mall via Maine Mall Rd and Payne Rd, exit E connects directly to I-295 north, exit A connects directly to Broadway, exit S connects to the southbound Scarborough Connector. The highway continues east to its terminus at Main Street.

== History ==
The Maine Turnpike Approach Road has existed in some form since the Maine Turnpike first opened to traffic in 1947. Various improvements and upgrades, including the construction of the southern section of I-295 in 1971, have resulted in the modern freeway that exists today. The SR 703 number was first introduced in official correspondence in 2004 and was later made an official designation.

On October 5, 2022, exit 45 on the Maine Turnpike was reconfigured from a trumpet interchange into a diamond interchange. The road was renamed in June 2023 to Samantha Smith Way in honor of Manchester activist Samantha Smith.

== Proposed extension ==
The Maine Turnpike Authority had proposed constructing a new toll road, called the Gorham Connector, to connect SR 703 to SR 114 where it intersects with the Gorham Bypass road, for the purpose of relieving chronic traffic congestion on SR 22 and SR 114. The six mile road would have an interchange at SR 22 and at Running Hill Road in Scarborough, with an estimated toll of $1.50. The project is estimated to cost as much as $237 million. The Maine Legislature has limited the bond capacity of the MTA for constructing such a road to $150 million, but other Turnpike revenues can go towards such a project. The Portland City Council passed a resolution opposing construction of the road, citing climate change; the four communities the route will pass through, Scarborough, South Portland, Westbrook, and Gorham, have all preliminarily approved it. The specific route of the road was announced on February 5, 2024. The MTA ultimately cancelled plans for the road in the face of increasing opposition from property owners and the communities the road would have passed through, deciding instead to study alternative options for traffic relief.

== Exit list ==
Exits are listed in order from east to west as mileposts increase in that direction. The entire route is in South Portland, Cumberland County.

mi	km	Exit	Destinations	Notes
0.00	0.00		US 1 / SR 9 (Main Street) – South Portland, Scarborough	Eastern terminus; at-grade intersection
0.74	1.19	N	I-295 north – Portland	Westbound exit and entrance; access via SR 701 north
0.74	1.19	S	Scarborough Connector — Scarborough, Old Orchard	Eastbound exit and entrance, unsigned SR 701 south
1.01	1.63	A	Broadway — South Portland	Eastbound exit/westbound entrance
1.24	2.00	E	I-295 north – Portland	No westbound exit
1.66	2.67	G (WB); J (EB)	SR 114 / Maine Mall Road – Jetport	Last westbound exit before toll
		Toll plaza (westbound only)		
1.91	3.07		I-95 / Maine Turnpike – Kittery, Boston, Lewiston, Augusta	Western terminus; exit 45 on I-95 / Turnpike
1.000 mi = 1.609 km; 1.000 km = 0.621 mi: Incomplete access; Tolled
