= METRO Pulse (bus station) =

Bus station in Portland, Maine, U.S.

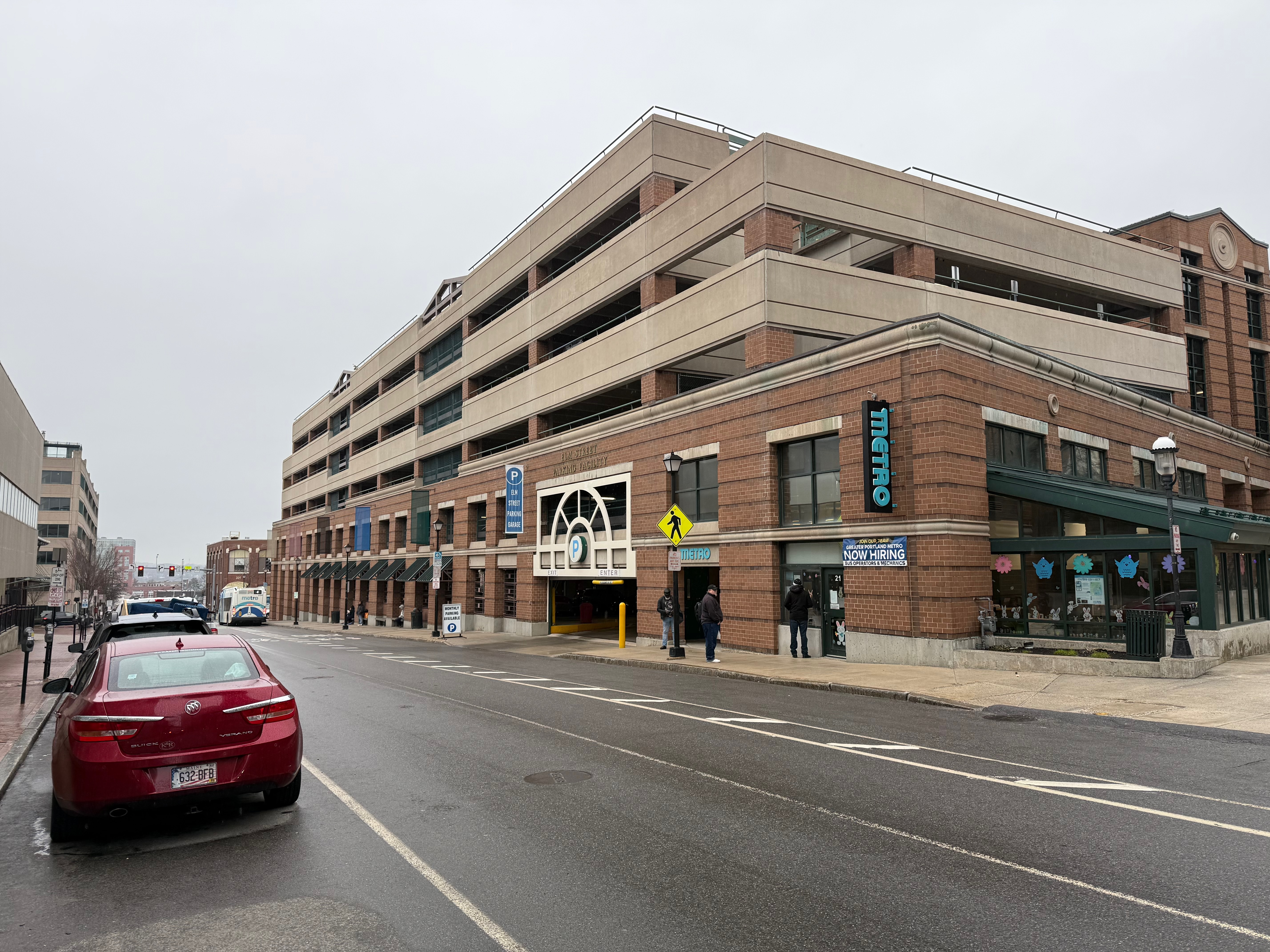
- The facility pictured in 2025

General information
- Location: 21 Elm Street, Portland, Maine, U.S.
- Coordinates: 43.65853°N 70.25941°W
- Operator: City of Portland
- Bus routes: 3
- Bus operators: Greater Portland Metro
Location
- Location within Maine

METRO Pulse is a bus station in Portland, Maine, United States. Located on Elm Street, at its intersection with Cumberland Avenue, it is one of the two hubs of Greater Portland Metro's bus network, the other being Westbrook Hub.

As of 2025, three Greater Portland Metro bus routes serve Pulse: 2 (Forest Avenue), 4 (Westbrook) and 5 (The Maine Mall). A fourth (route 25) will begin in October 2026. Several more serve nearby Congress Street, with the nearest stop being outside Portland Public Library.

== See also ==
- Public transportation in Maine
