= Cooperative Alliance for Seacoast Transportation =

- Founded: 1981
- Headquarters: 42 Sumner Drive; Dover, New Hampshire, U.S.
- Service area: Strafford County, New Hampshire; Rockingham County, New Hampshire
- Service type: Bus service, paratransit
- Routes: 12
- Fleet: 24
- Website: coastbus.org

The Cooperative Alliance for Seacoast Transportation (COAST) is a government agency that provides public transit for the Seacoast region of New Hampshire, as well as parts of southern Maine. Founded as a non-profit organization in March 1981, it was originally a contractor to previously existing bus lines that it took over in October 1982. COAST was established as an independent public body by the New Hampshire House of Representatives in 1985 to provide public transit service in the Seacoast region. The agency has eight local routes and three regional routes, an on-demand paratransit network, and transportation for senior citizens.

== Fleet ==
COAST operates a fleet of 37 vehicles, including standard transit buses, trolley replicas, cutaway vans, and accessible minivans as part of its regular service. COAST's operating fleet consists of the following (as of 2013):

Transit buses

- Three 2001 Gillig Low Floor buses (30')
- Four 2008 Gillig Low Floor buses (40')
- Five 2011 Gillig Low Floor buses (35'), including three trolley replicas
- Six 2012 Gillig Low Floor buses (29' & 35'), including two trolley replicas
- Five 1995 New Flyer Industries D40LF buses, purchased used in 2012 from Orange County Transportation

Vans

- Six accessible minivans (2009, 2010, 2012, 2013) for ADA paratransit service
- Four Ford 14-passenger cutaway vans (2006, 2007, 2010)

== Services ==
The Clipper Connection is the colloquial term for COAST's commuter express routes, which were launched in 2012. The Clipper Connection routes are intended to provide express connections for commuters to the Portsmouth Naval Shipyard (PNSY) in Kittery, Maine, Pease Tradeport, and downtown Portsmouth.

COAST currently operates three routes providing service to the communities of Dover, Rochester, and Somersworth in New Hampshire, as well as Berwick, South Berwick and Eliot in Maine. Service to Kittery began in 2020 after the town was initially served by buses reserved for use by Portsmouth Naval Shipyard employees.

== See also ==
- Public transportation in Maine
