= Greater Portland Metro =

Regional public transportation system in Southern Maine

Greater Portland METRO

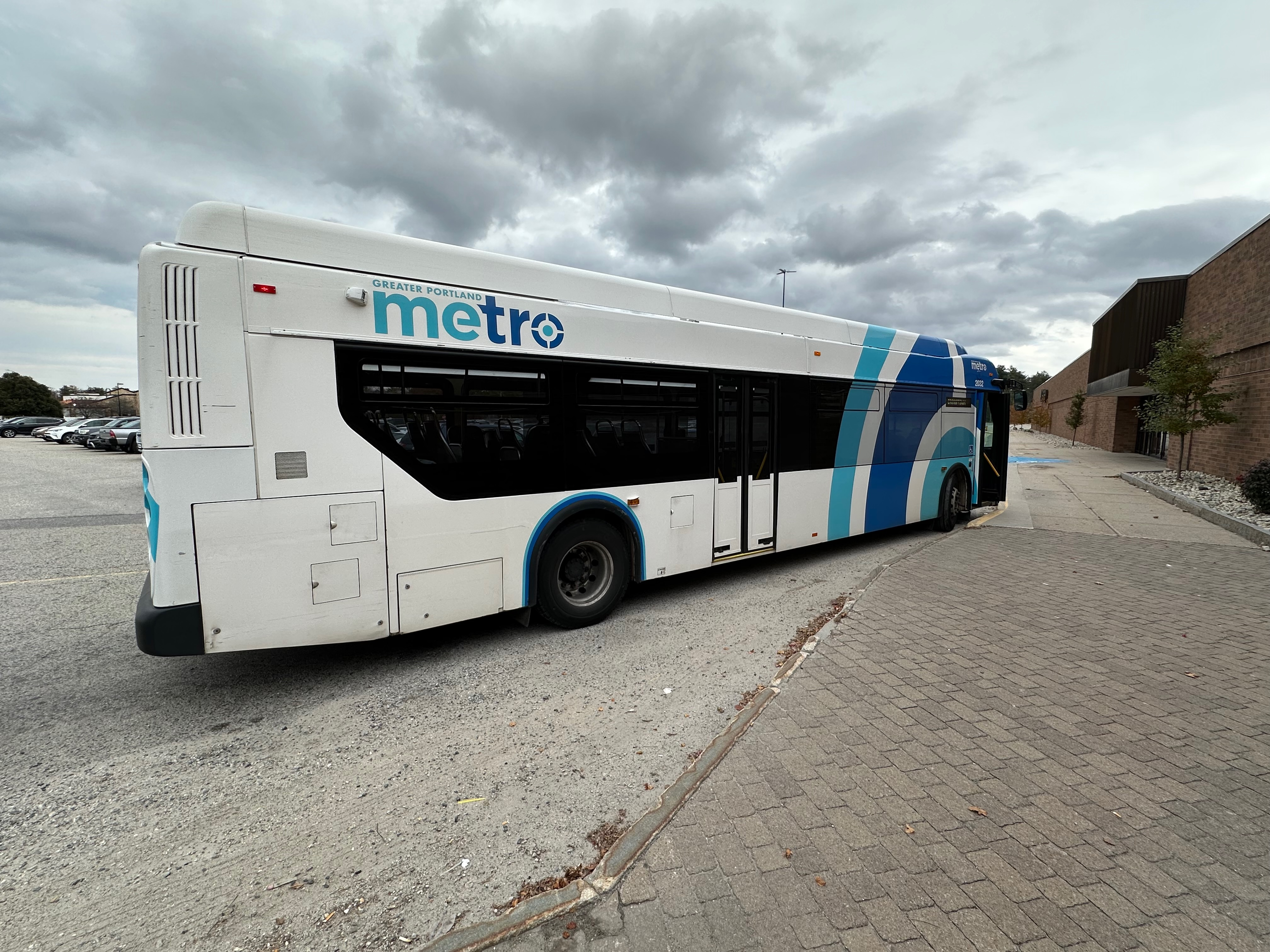
- A METRO bus in 2023
- Founded: 1966 (60 years ago)
- Headquarters: METRO Pulse, 114 Valley Street, Portland, Maine
- Locale: Greater Portland, Maine
- Service area: Portland, Brunswick, Gorham, Falmouth, Freeport, South Portland, Westbrook, Yarmouth
- Service type: Bus service, express bus service
- Routes: 15 (fixed, plus one fully on-demand service)
- Hubs: METRO Pulse at Elm St. and Congress St. on the Portland Peninsula; Westbrook Hub at Mechanic St. in downtown Westbrook
- Fleet: 31
- Daily ridership: 6,240 per weekday (2024)
- Annual ridership: 1,817,135 (2024)
- Operator: Greater Portland Transit District
- Chief executive: Glenn Fenton (as of July 2024)
- Website: Greater Portland METRO

The Greater Portland METRO is a regional public transportation system, established in 1966, in Southern Maine. Operated by the Greater Portland Transit District, a transit district comprising Portland, South Portland, Scarborough, Gorham, Westbrook, Falmouth, Yarmouth, Freeport and Brunswick.

METRO is Maine's largest public transportation agency. The transit system's annual ridership was 2,104,150 in 2019, up 13.7% from 1,850,686 in 2017.

As of 2016, METRO operated a fleet of eighteen compressed natural gas (CNG) buses and fourteen diesel buses. It operates and maintains the only CNG fuel station in the state of Maine.

== History ==
The ancestor to the METRO, the Portland and Forest Avenue Railroad Co., began operating horse-drawn lines in 1860. They were upgraded to streetcars in 1891, which operated for fifty years before the company switched to buses. The company's new parent, Central Maine Power, sold the buses to Portland Coach Company in 1944.

Concerned about the viability of transit in the region, the Greater Portland Transit District was created in 1966. Three years later it purchased the struggling Portland Coach Company, which became METRO in 1976. Several municipalities serviced by METRO withdrew during an age of contraction; service to Yarmouth and Cape Elizabeth ended in 1978, South Portland withdrew in 1983 (although METRO continues to run select buses to the city), and the Portland School Department began operating its own buses in 1985.

The system began to turnaround in the late 1990s, and in 2004 it expanded to Falmouth, which later joined the Greater Portland Transit District. Portland Public Schools ended yellow school bus transportation for all of Portland's high school students and entered into an agreement with METRO to provide each student with a free unlimited METRO pass starting in 2015. The program has generated 250,000 boardings for the agency while allowing Portland Public Schools greater flexibility with school bell times and repurposing staff and equipment resources to other priorities. Portland charter school Baxter Academy for Technology and Science also offers METRO passes to students.

The METRO BREEZ express service started in June 2016. It serves Portland, Yarmouth, Freeport and Brunswick. Two new lines debuted in August 2018 serving Gorham and adding expanded service to Westbrook. New buses with USB ports and Wi-Fi were introduced around 2020, as were bus shelters.

In October 2024, it was announced that Greater Portland METRO would merge with South Portland Bus Service and incorporate South Portland's routes 21, 24A, and 24B into METRO, effective December 29, 2024. The routes in South Portland are most likely going to remain the same, although METRO may suggest improvements over the next few years. All South Portland drivers were taken into employment at METRO.

In 2024, Greater Portland Transit District began using Equans's NAVINEO computer aided dispatch and automatic vehicle location (CAD/AVL), an intelligent transportation system (ITS), and Optibus, which will assist the company in managing detours in real time, adding or removing trips and will support detailed ridership analysis. It will also allow the configuration of automatic voice announcements (AVA).

== Routes ==
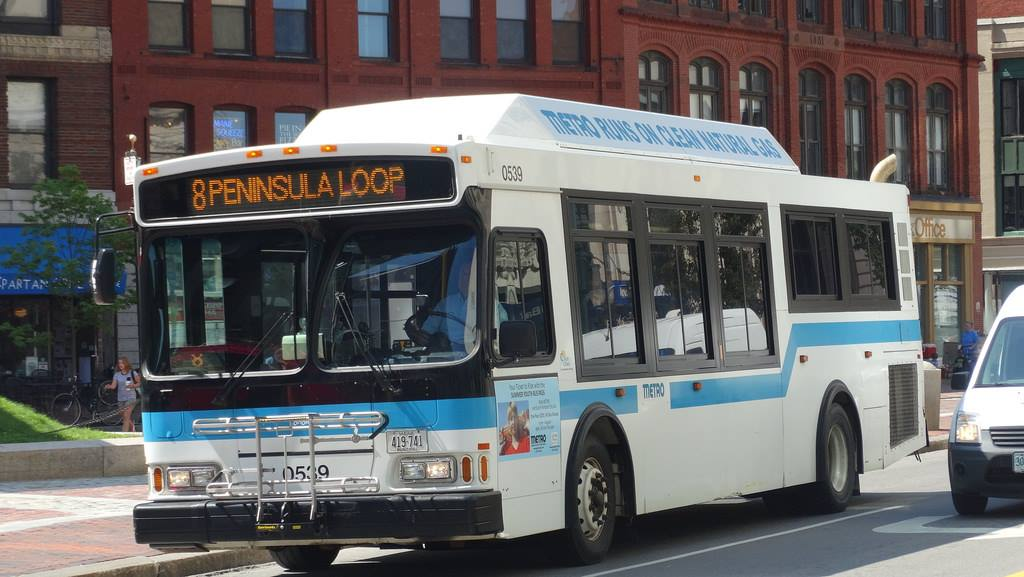
Route 8 bus in a pre-2017 livery

METRO operates two hubs: one in downtown Portland, called the METRO Pulse, and one in downtown Westbrook, also known as the Westbrook Hub. Additionally, the Portland Transportation Center, which provides an intercity bus connection and Amtrak service, serves as a major transfer point.

Intercity service from York County, Maine's southernmost county, connects to the METRO system at The Maine Mall and at several stops along Congress Street.

Local routes are numbered 1 through 9, with the 9 split into 9A and 9B. There is currently no route 6. There is one lettered route, the Husky Line (H), which connects the Gorham and Portland campuses of the University of Southern Maine. There is one express route, the BREEZ, which runs between Portland and Brunswick; on signage, it is identified as "B". There is also a Metro CONNECT route, an on-demand shuttle service to expand service in Scarborough.

Routes 21, 24A and 24B from South Portland Bus Service have been incorporated into METRO as of December 29, 2024, with no planned route changes thus far. The fares of these routes will remain the same as the other METRO routes.

METRO has confirmed plans to expand into Scarborough in October 2026, via a new route 25 service. A hybrid fixed-route and on-demand service, the route will become operational on October 4, 2026.

The fifteen fixed routes and one fully on-demand service:

Route	Major stops (outbound)
1 – Congress Street	Portland Transportation Center, Monument Square, Eastern Promenade, North Street, Portland Public Library, St. John Street
2 – Forest Avenue	METRO Pulse, Woodfords Corner, Morrills Corner, Hannaford Riverton, Pride's Corner
3 – Westbrook Crosstown	The Maine Mall, Target, Westbrook Hub, Westbrook Community Center, Hannaford Riverton
4 – Westbrook	METRO Pulse, Rosemont Corner, Westbrook Crossing, Hannaford, Westbrook Hub, Idexx Laboratories, Hamlet
5 – Maine Mall	METRO Pulse, Portland Exposition Building, Westgate, The Maine Mall
7 – Falmouth	Portland International Jetport, Congress/Hutchins, Westgate, Maine Medical Center, Monument Square, Washington/Veranda, Walmart, Shaw's As of December 29, 2024, this route will no longer service OceanView, Johnson Road, Town Landing Market or Route 88, instead using an on-demand shuttle service.
8 – Peninsula Loop	Hannaford Plaza, Congress/Forest, Maine Medical Center, Monument Square, Casco Bay Lines, Franklin Towers, Whole Foods Market, Hannaford Plaza
9A – North Deering via Stevens Avenue	City Hall, Westgate, Morrills Corner, Washington/Auburn, Summit/Allen, Allen's Corner, Washington/Veranda, City Hall
9B – North Deering via Washington Avenue	Monument Square, Washington/Veranda, Allen's Corner, Summit/Allen, West Falmouth Hannaford, Morrills Corner, Westgate, Monument Square
21 – South Portland (Willard Square-SMCC)	Congress Street and Forest Ave, Mill Creek Transit Hub, Ocean and Sawyer Street, Pillsbury and Cottage Road; SMCC; Ferry Village and High Street
24A – South Portland	Mill Creek Transit Hub, Redbank Village, Maine Mall, Walmart
24B – South Portland	Mill Creek Transit Hub, Highland Community Center, Cash Corner, Redbank Village, Maine Mall, Walmart
25 – South Portland	METRO Pulse, West Commercial Street, Veterans Memorial Bridge, Cash Corner, Route 1 in Scarborough, The Downs
H – Husky Line	Ocean Gateway, USM Portland, Westbrook Hub, USM Gorham
B – BREEZ	Express service. Portland Transportation Center, Monument Square, Yarmouth Town Hall, Downtown Freeport/L.L.Bean, Bowdoin College, Brunswick station
METRO Connect	An on-demand service which will augment route 25

== Fares and accessibility ==
=== Fares ===
METRO, along with the Biddeford-Saco-Old Orchard Beach Transit, participates in a regional automated fare collection system known as DiriGo Pass. This system uses the UMO Pass platform developed by Cubic. Passengers load money onto their account and pay fares using a smartcard or the UMO mobile app. METRO introduced contactless payments on its buses in 2026.

Standard fares are $2.25 for all local service, and $4.50 for the BREEZ service. Passengers may transfer for free within 90 minutes if using the mobile app or smartcard. If transferring to the BREEZ, passengers pay the difference in fare. A fare capping system has been implemented, so that after $6.50 in local fares or $13 in BREEZ express fares are paid in a calendar day, no more fares will be charged to the account. Fares are also capped at $60 in a calendar month for local fares, and $130 for BREEZ fares.

Reduced fare is around half of the normal fare, as are the monthly and daily caps. Reduced fares are applicable for persons with disabilities, anyone over 65, veterans, youth ages 6–18, and Medicare card holders. Cash continues to be accepted; however, no free transfers are available.

=== Accessibility ===
METRO buses are equipped with passenger lifts or ramps and contain space for two riders using wheelchairs. Riders with mobility needs can also use the Regional Transportation Program paratransit service.

== See also ==
- Public transportation in Maine
