= South Portland Bus Service =

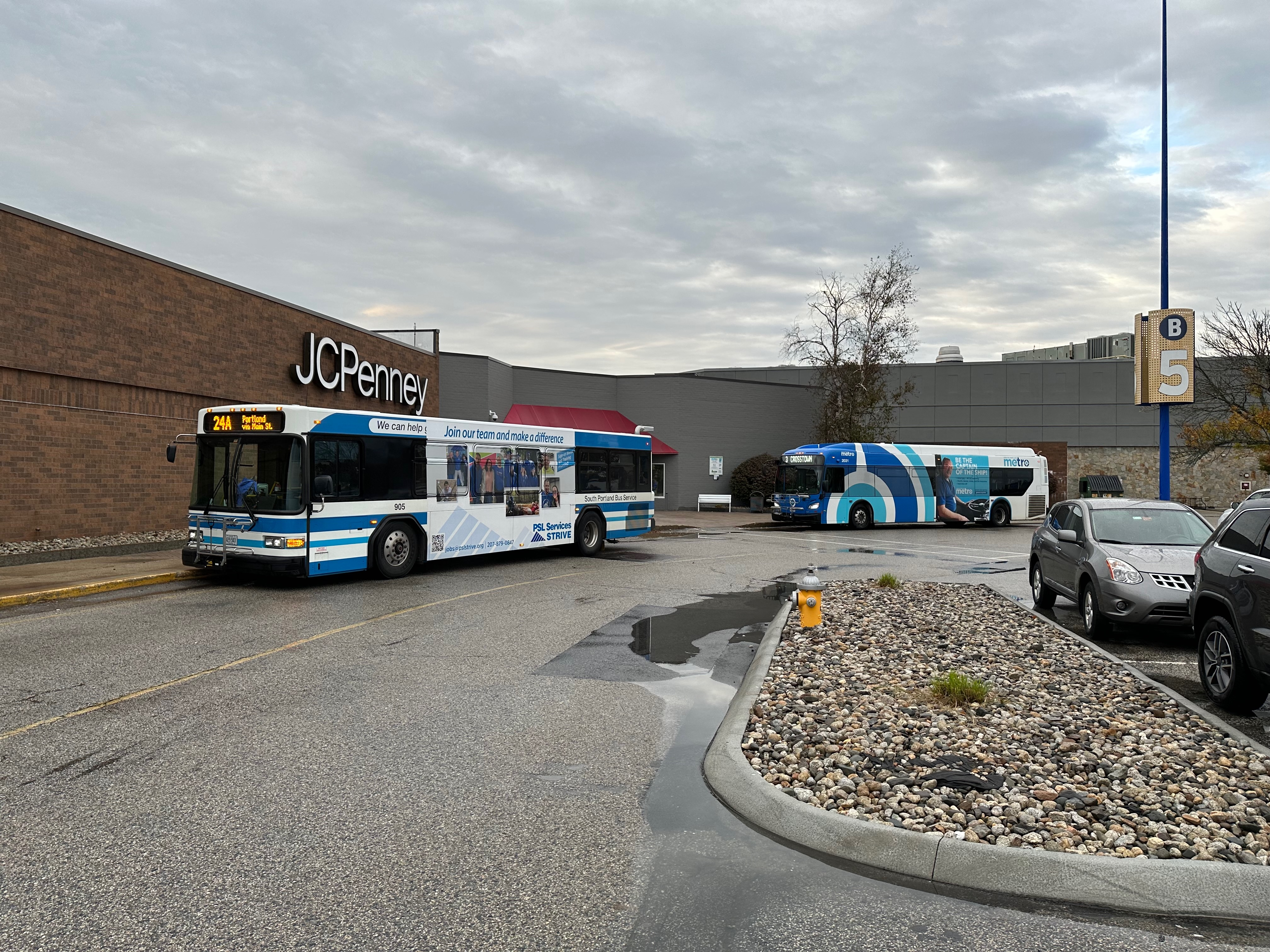
- South Portland Bus Service's route 24A, in front of Greater Portland Metro's route 3 (Westbrook Crosstown), at The Maine Mall (2023)
- Founded: 1983
- Defunct: 2024
- Headquarters: 25 Cottage Road
- Locale: South Portland, Maine
- Service area: Cumberland County, Maine
- Service type: Public transport bus service, paratransit
- Routes: 3
- Website: South Portland Bus Service official web site

South Portland Bus Service was a municipally owned suburban provider of mass transportation. Because the city of South Portland opted out of the Greater Portland Transit District, this community ran its own separate three-route bus service from 1983 until 2024, when it merged with the Greater Portland Metro. Two routes serve major shopping areas and loop through major residential streets, funnelling residents locally and giving them access to downtown Portland. A third route provides access to Willard Beach and Southern Maine Community College, with all three routes going to downtown Portland.

== Merger with Greater Portland METRO ==
In 2024, the City Council of South Portland voted unanimously to merge its municipal bus service with the regional Greater Portland METRO bus system. METRO agreed to maintain the same routes, and hire all the existing South Portland bus drivers if they so choose. This change took place December 29, 2024.

== Routes ==
- 21 Willard Square/SMCC
- 24A Maine Mall via Main Street
- 24B Maine Mall via Community Center

As of reporting in June 2024, route 21 had an annual ridership of around 70,000 for 2024, while route 24A had around 89,000, and 24B around 56,000.

== See also ==
- Public transportation in Maine
