= Lewiston-Auburn CityLink =

Lewiston-Auburn citylink
- Founded: 1976
- Headquarters: 125 Manley Road
- Locale: Auburn, Maine
- Service area: Androscoggin County, Maine
- Service type: bus service, paratransit
- Routes: 9
- Daily ridership: 985
- Website: Official website

The Lewiston-Auburn citylink is the primary provider of mass transportation in Androscoggin County, Maine. Founded in 1976 after a joint agreement between the twin cities of Lewiston and Auburn, the bureau markets itself through its distinct fleet of purple buses. Service runs Monday through Friday along nine routes.

== Route list ==
- 1 pleasant st
- 2 Lisbon st
- 3 Sabattus st
- 5 Main St
- 6 Circulator
- 7 All Hubs
- 8 Auburn - Walmart
- 9 Lewiston Walmart CMCC

== See also ==
- Public transportation in Maine
