= Brunswick Link =

Bus system in Maine, United States

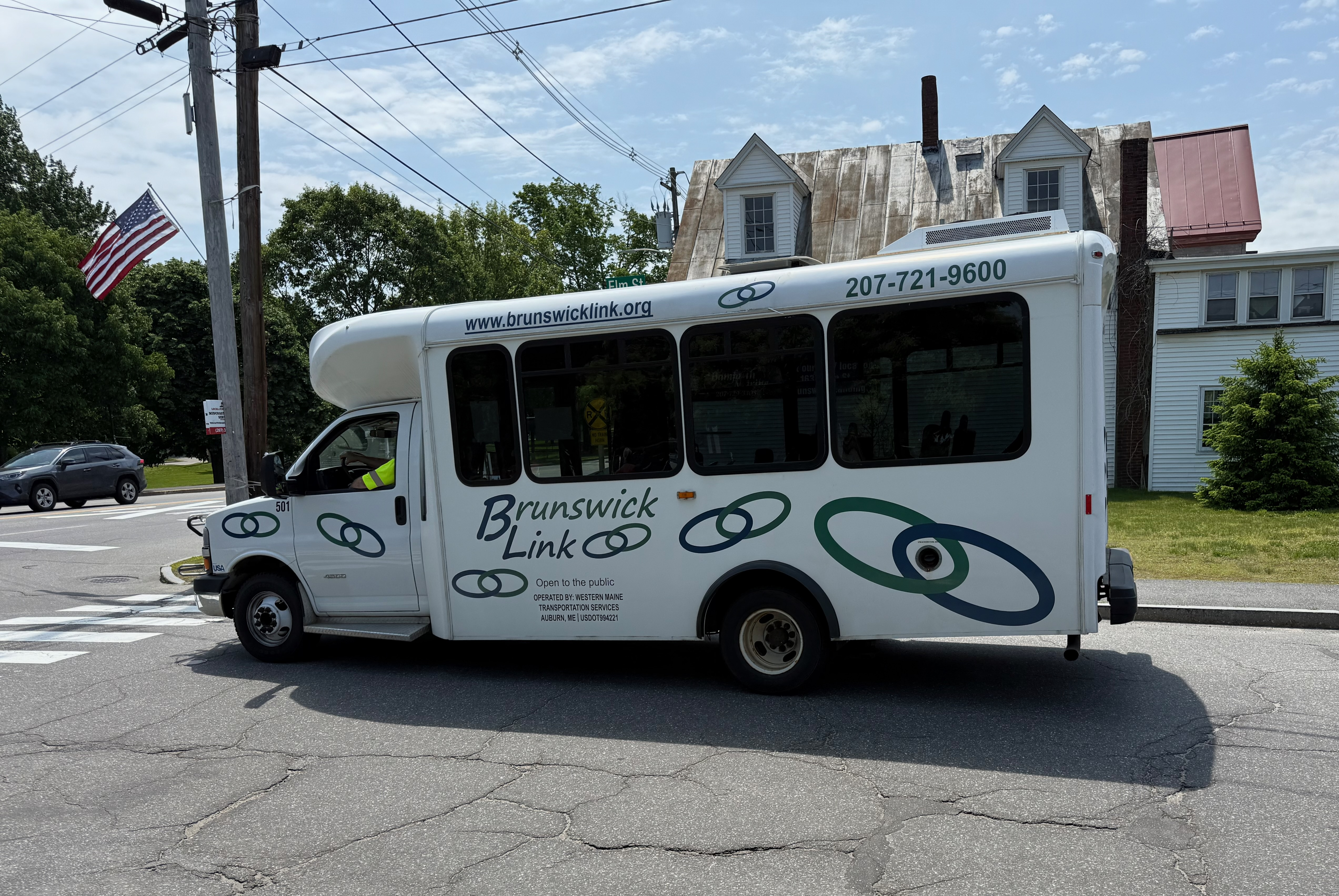
- A Brunswick Link bus in 2025
- Founded: 2010 (as the Brunswick Explorer)
- Locale: Brunswick, Maine
- Service area: Cumberland County, Maine
- Service type: Bus service
- Routes: 1
- Stops: 27
- Operator: Western Maine Transportation Services
- Website: http://www.brunswicklink.org

The Brunswick Link is a bus service in Brunswick, Maine, United States. Established in 2021, as a successor to the Brunswick Explorer, the bus route serves 27 stops in the Brunswick and Cook's Corner areas. It is operated by Western Maine Transportation Services, Inc., a non-profit 501(c)(3) regional transportation corporation, created by statute in 1976 and appointed by the Maine Department of Transportation to provide public transportation.

The Brunswick Explorer was a "flex route", but a study undertaken in 2020 determined that the town would benefit from a full-schedule fixed-route service.

The Brunswick Link runs hourly from the Amtrak station to Mid Coast Hospital, via Brunswick Landing. It also provides a connection, three times a day, to the BlueLine Commuter service, also run by Western Maine Transportation, which services Bath, the Topsham Fair Mall, Lisbon Falls and Lewiston. Connections are also made to the Metro BREEZ express bus to and from Portland, the state's most populous city.

The buses are able to divert off-route for up to 0.75 miles (1.21 km) to pick up passengers with disabilities, as long as reservations have been made through the Americans with Disabilities Act.

== See also ==
- Public transportation in Maine
