= Jordan's Furniture =

American furniture retailer

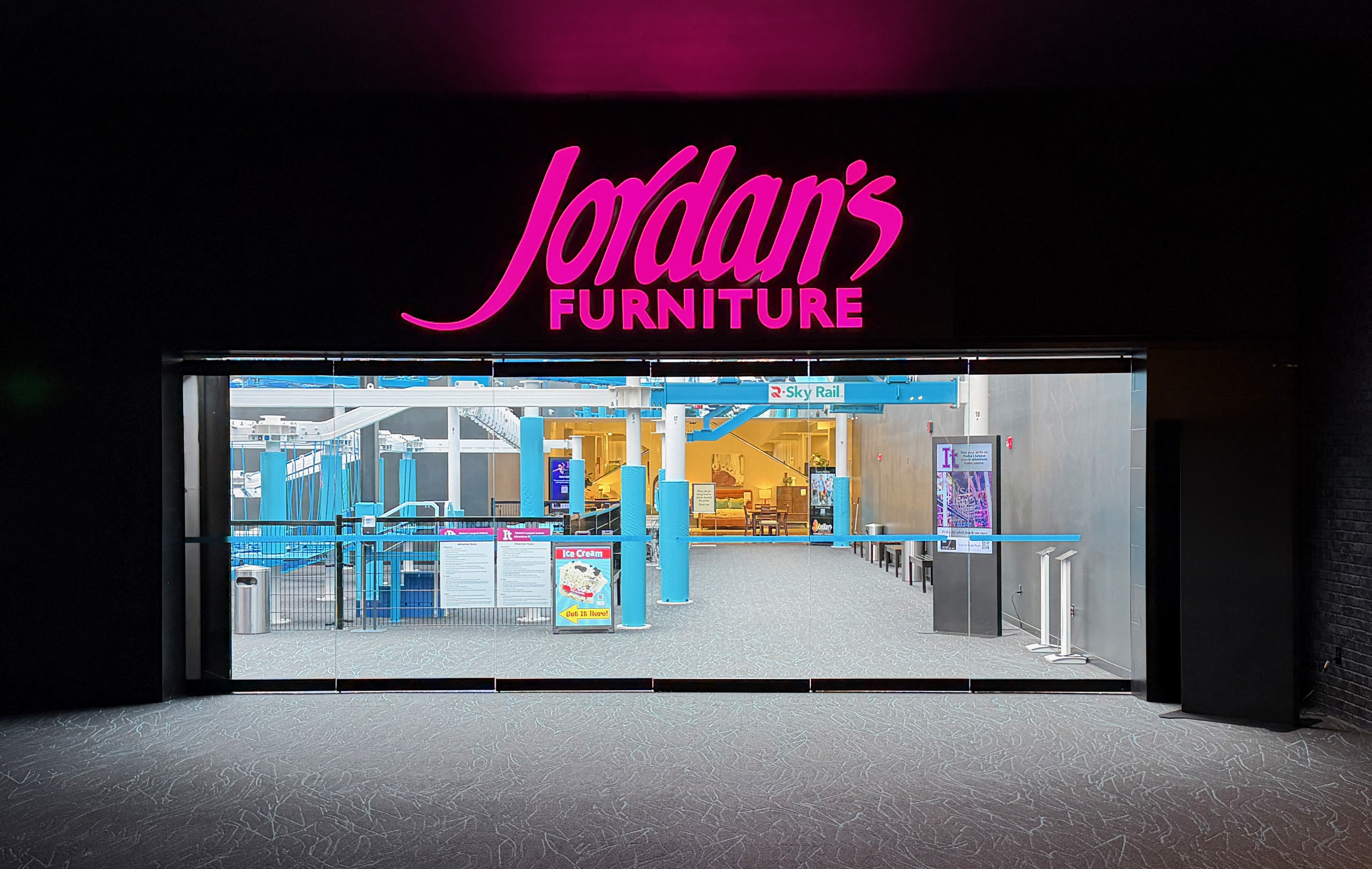
- The entrance to the "It" Adventure Ropes Course at The Maine Mall store
- Type: Subsidiary
- Industry: Retail
- Genre: Furniture
- Founded: 1928; 98 years ago in Waltham, Massachusetts, United States
- Founder: Samuel Tatelman
- Headquarters: Dedham, Massachusetts, United States
- Number of locations: 8
- Areas served: Connecticut; Maine; Massachusetts; New Hampshire; Rhode Island
- Products: Furniture; bedding; mattresses
- Owner: Berkshire Hathaway
- Website: jordans.com

Jordan's Furniture is an American furniture store chain. It was founded in 1928 by Samuel Tatelman, and acquired by Berkshire Hathaway in 1999. Jordan's operates eight locations in Connecticut, Massachusetts, New Hampshire, and Rhode Island.

== History ==
Jordan's Furniture logo in use until 2026

The company was started by Samuel Tatelman, who sold furniture from a truck for a decade until opening a store in Waltham, Massachusetts, in 1928. In 1940, his son Edward joined the business. In 1973, Edward's sons Barry and Eliot took over the business. They stopped advertising on the back page of the Waltham paper and started advertising on the radio. The origin of the company's name is uncertain; Barry once said that their grandfather chose the name out of a hat. Samuel Tatelman died in 1979, and Edward Tatelman died in 1980.

In 1983, Barry and Eliot built and opened a location in Nashua, New Hampshire. In 1987, they opened the location in Avon, Massachusetts, creating the largest traffic jam ever recorded on Route 24. Barry and Eliot had to go on the radio to beg people not to come, while customers stood in line for hours waiting for their turn to go into the showroom.

On April 17, 1998, Barry and Eliot opened a location in Natick, Massachusetts. With 120,000 sq ft (11,000 m^{2}) of showroom space and a Mardi Gras/Bourbon Street theme, the location introduced Jordan's to the MetroWest area.

In October 1999, the Tatelman brothers sold the company and its four retail locations to conglomerate Berkshire Hathaway. At the time of the sale, Barry and Eliot said it would enable them to give their children the freedom to choose any career, and would help the Tatelmans to open more stores. Each employee received a financial gift of 50 cents for every hour ever worked at Jordan's. Operationally, Barry and Eliot remained at the helm as integral parts of the company, while still starring in the brand's radio and television commercials.

The Waltham store closed in October 2004, the same month that the store in Reading, Massachusetts, opened. In addition, Jordan's opened a 750,000 sq ft (70,000 m^{2}) warehouse and office complex in East Taunton, Massachusetts. In 2005, the warehouse underneath the Avon store was converted into the Colossal Clearance Center, containing over 60,000 square feet (5,600 m^{2}) of clearance merchandise.

Barry Tatelman left the company in December 2006, to pursue other interests including helping to produce the Broadway show Dirty Rotten Scoundrels.

In December 2015, Jordan's Furniture opened its doors in New Haven, Connecticut, in the building that formerly housed the New Haven Register, with Warren Buffett attending the grand opening. In 2020, the company opened a location at The Maine Mall in South Portland. In 2023, the company opened a location at the Westfarms Mall in Farmington, Connecticut.

== Entertainment ==
On August 22, 2002, the IMAX theater at Jordan's Furniture in Natick opened its doors to the public. An IMAX theater was also opened at Jordan's location in Reading in 2004.

A ropes course, branded as "It", is featured at three locations: Reading, New Haven, and South Portland. Each also features a course for children, branded "LittleIt".

The Reading location features "Beantown", which is a "replica of Downtown Boston and its most famous landmarks" made from jelly beans.

The Avon store seasonally features "The Enchanted Village", which was initially displayed by Jordan Marsh at their Downtown Crossing store in Boston; Jordan's purchased it from the City of Boston after the city discontinued displaying it. As of July 2022, there are dining options within the Jordan's in Avon (Montilio's) and Reading (Fuddruckers).

=== Defunct entertainments ===
On Mother's Day of 1992, the Motion Odyssey Movie (MOM) opened in the Avon store, after five years of planning and a $2.5 million investment. A theme ride originally produced by George Lucas, its profits were donated to charity.

As of 2015, the ride was still operating, although "only during select school vacation weeks and holidays". The ride was later revised and rebranded as "The Polar Express 4-D Experience", last appearing on the company's website in late 2018.

The Reading store once featured a trapeze school, which included a 30-foot-tall (9.1 m), net-enclosed swing that anyone could sign up to use, along with seating for observers.

The location in Warwick, Rhode Island, offered a free visual experience titled "Splash", which featured LED lights flashing to dancing water fountains to all-time music. The attraction was in operation from its grand opening in 2011 to presumably mid-2017.

The Natick location had a Bourbon Street & Mardi Gras show, which featured a storyline following Barry and Eliot Tatelman, dressed as The Blues Brothers, and animatronic singers. It was part of their Consumer behaviour Program in 2002.
