= The Maine Mall =

Shopping mall in the United States

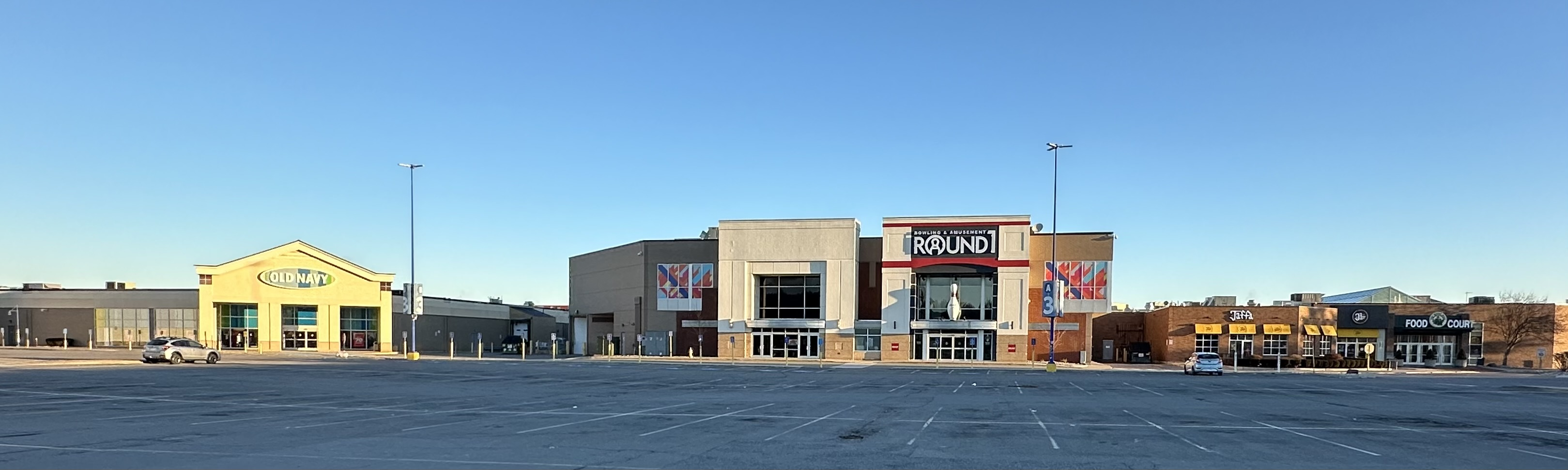
- Exterior view of the southwestern side (2023)
- Coordinates: 43°38′0″N 70°20′5″W
- Address: 364 Maine Mall Road, South Portland, Maine
- Opened: 1971 (55 years ago)
- Manager: GGP
- Owner: GGP
- Num. of stores: 123
- Num. of anchor tenants: 7 (5 occupied, 2 vacant)
- Floor area: 1,009,044 square feet (93,743.3 m^{2})
- Floors: 1 (2 in Jordan's Furniture and Macy's)
- Website: mainemall.com

The Maine Mall is an enclosed shopping mall in South Portland, Maine, in the United States. Owned and managed by GGP, a subsidiary of BGRE, it is the largest shopping mall in the state of Maine and the second-largest in northern New England, behind The Mall at Rockingham Park in New Hampshire. Its anchor stores are Best Buy, JCPenney, Jordan's Furniture, Macy's, and Round One Entertainment, with two vacant anchors last occupied by Forever 21 and Sears.

== History ==
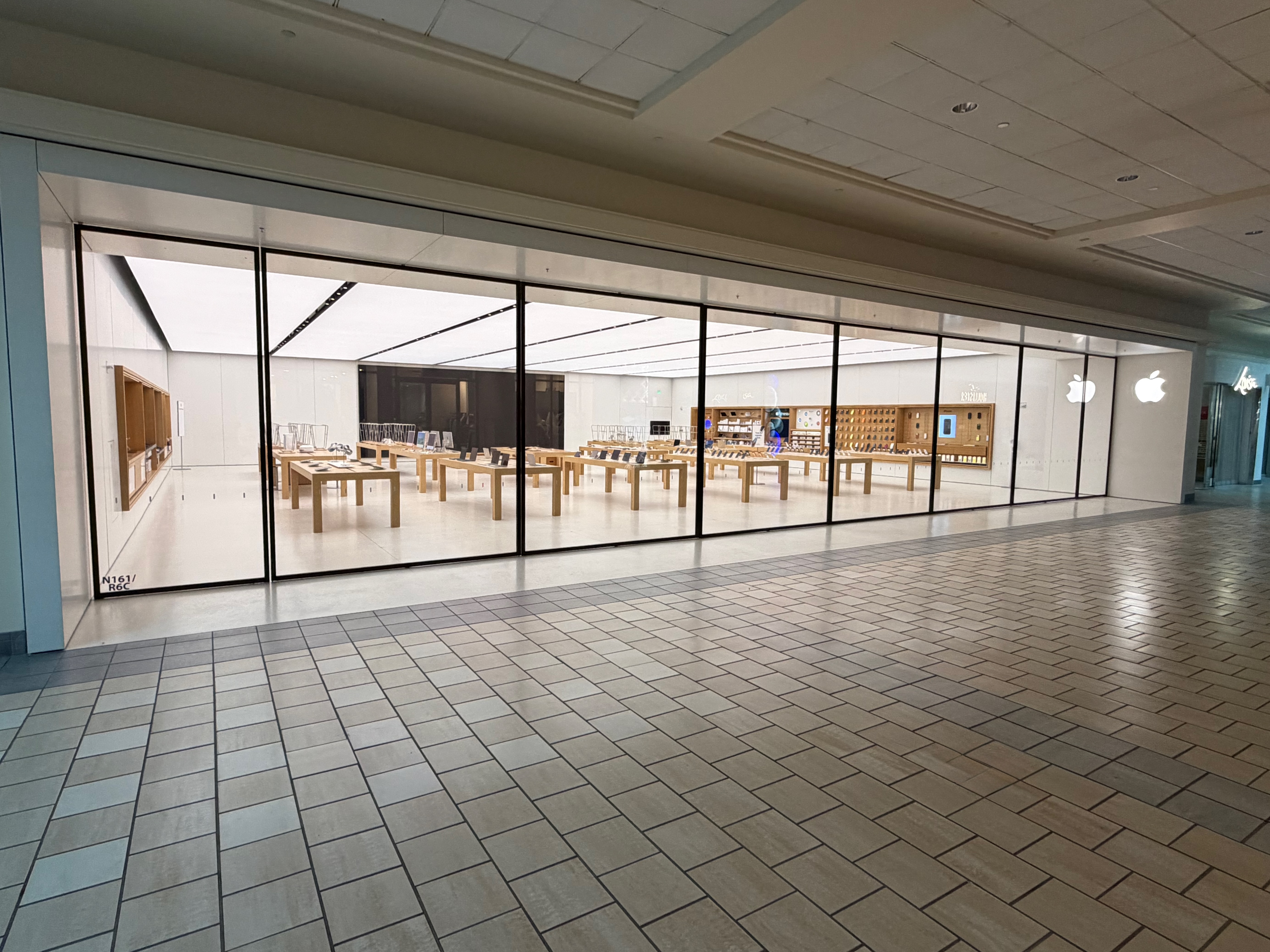
The Maine Mall's Apple Store, pictured in 2026

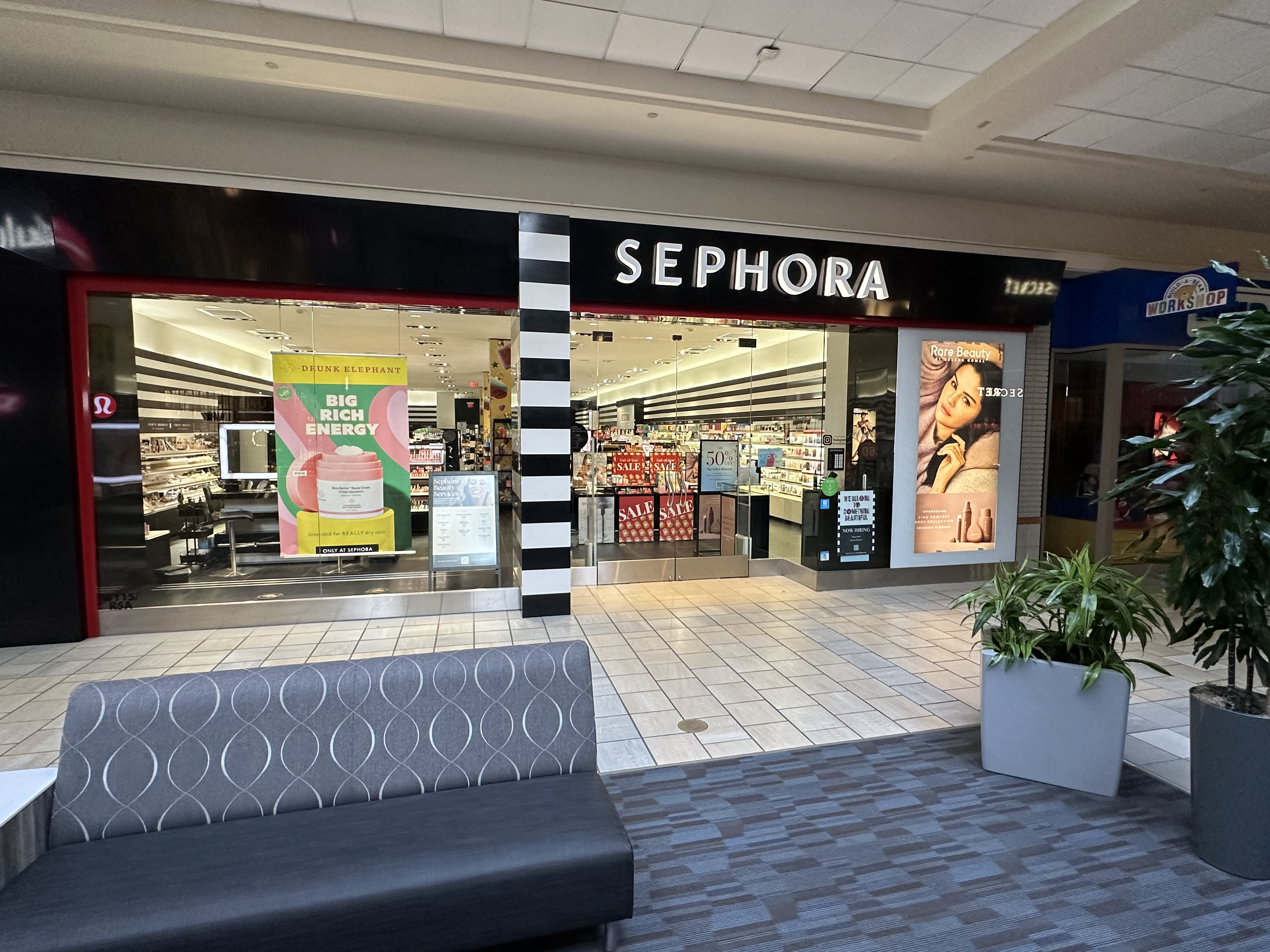
Sephora

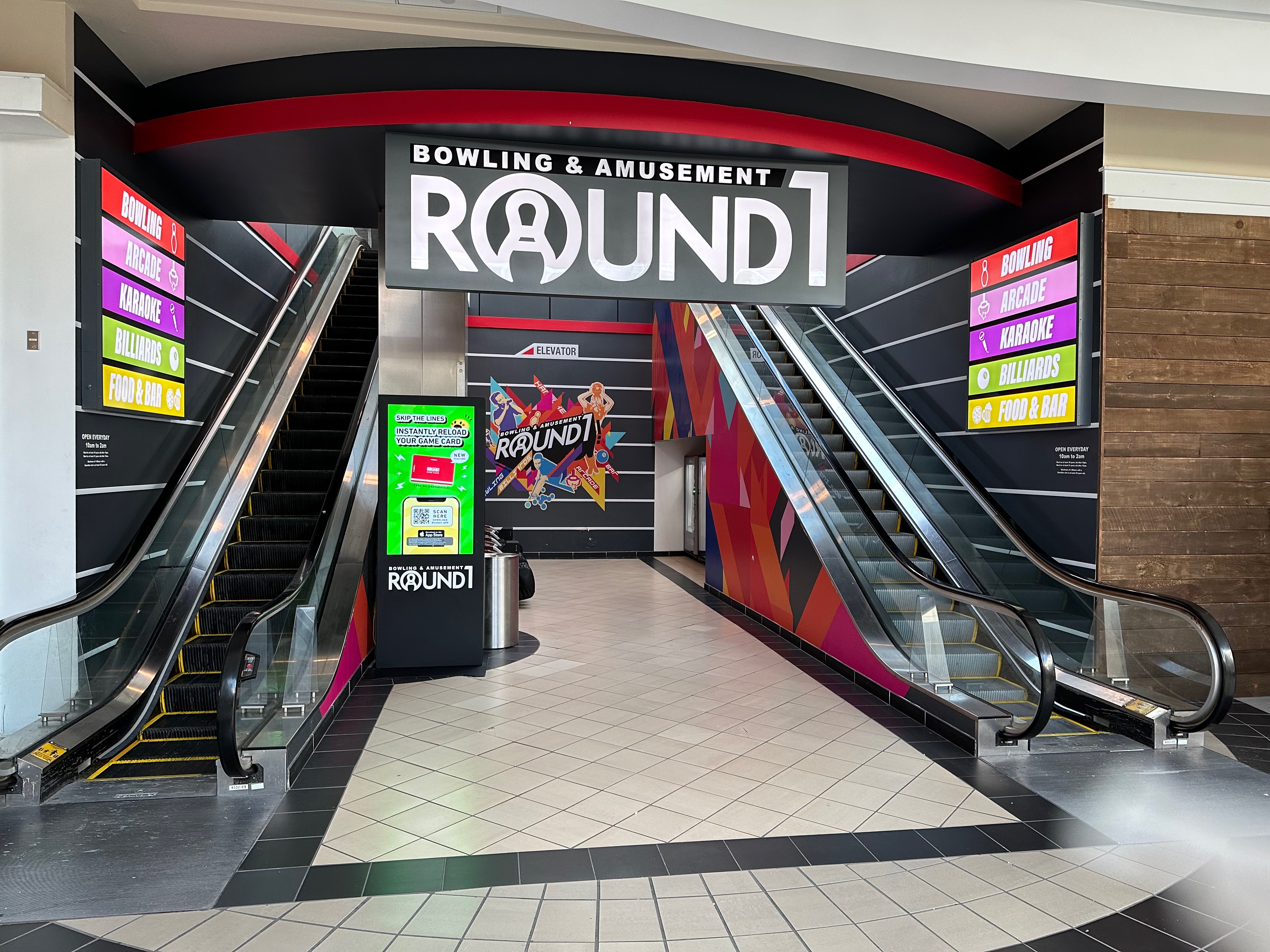
The escalators leading to and from the second-floor Round One

In 1969, Jordan Marsh opened a freestanding store which was the first Jordan Marsh in the state of Maine.

In 1971, the indoor shopping mall and Sears were added. A Gold Star IGA Supermarket opened at the back end on September 15, 1971, and the Sears opened October 11, 1971.

Porteous, a department store chain based in Portland, Maine, opened in 1983 as part of a major mall expansion which doubled the size of the mall. This expansion also added JCPenney as well as the state's first Filene's.

In 1994, the mall underwent a $6.5 million renovation that added a food court as well as Lechmere and a larger Dream Machine, a video game and pinball machine arcade. As a result, some more stores opened in the mall the same year, such as Learningsmith, the Disney Store, Thatcher's Restaurant, Payless Shoesource, Old Country Buffet, The Limited, Limited Too, Gap Kids, the Children's Place, Lids hats, the Body Shop, Gymboree, Express, Bath & Body Works and the Warner Bros. Studio Store.

Porteous closed on December 31, 1994, reopening in October 1996 and June 1997 as a Filene's Home Store and Sports Authority on the lower and upper levels, respectively. Borders Books and Music was built next to Jordan Marsh and held its grand opening on November 17, 1995. Jordan Marsh was acquired by Federated Department Stores in 1996; as a result, the mall's Jordan Marsh became Macy's. Meanwhile, that same year, the Bureau of Motor Vehicles opened. A Weathervane Seafood Restaurant was built in the same year.

In July 1997, F. W. Woolworth Company closed; on July 2, 1999 it was replaced by Linens 'n Things and American Eagle Outfitters, and Lechmere closed in November 1997 and was replaced by Best Buy on October 30, 1998, and David's Bridal on March 28, 1999, respectively. When Linens 'n Things and American Eagle opened in former Woolworth, Kay Bee Toy and Hobby relocated in between the two on the same day, and changed the name to KB Toys.

In 2003, General Growth Properties acquired the mall for $270 million.

In 2005, Federated Department Stores acquired the Filene's chain. Due to the presence of an existing Macy's at the mall, both the Filene's and Filene's home store were shuttered in 2006 to prevent overlap.

The state's only Apple Store opened at the mall in September 2008. In October 2019, it moved into a more central location in the building, occupying a space left by Abercrombie & Fitch's departure.

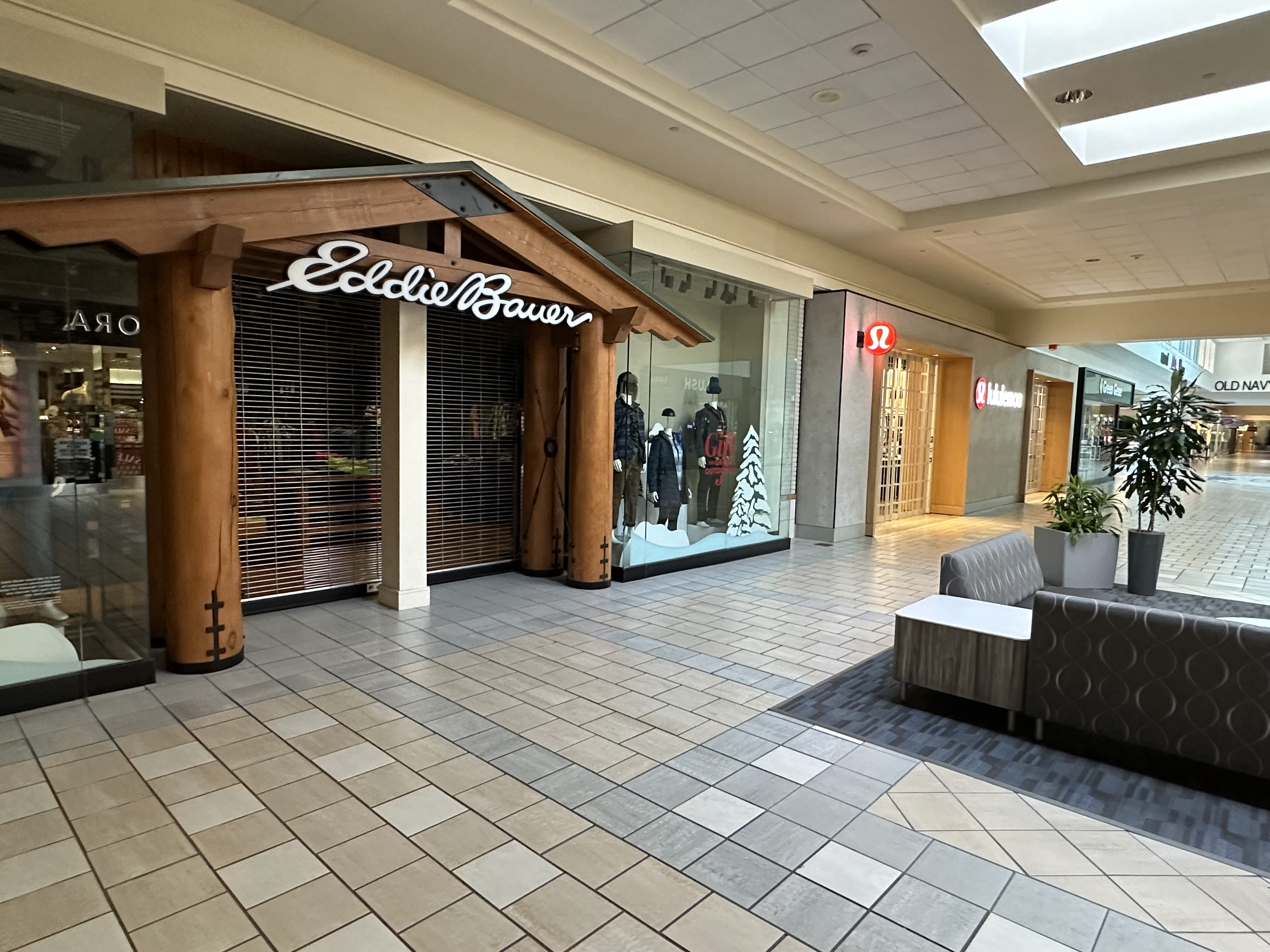
Eddie Bauer

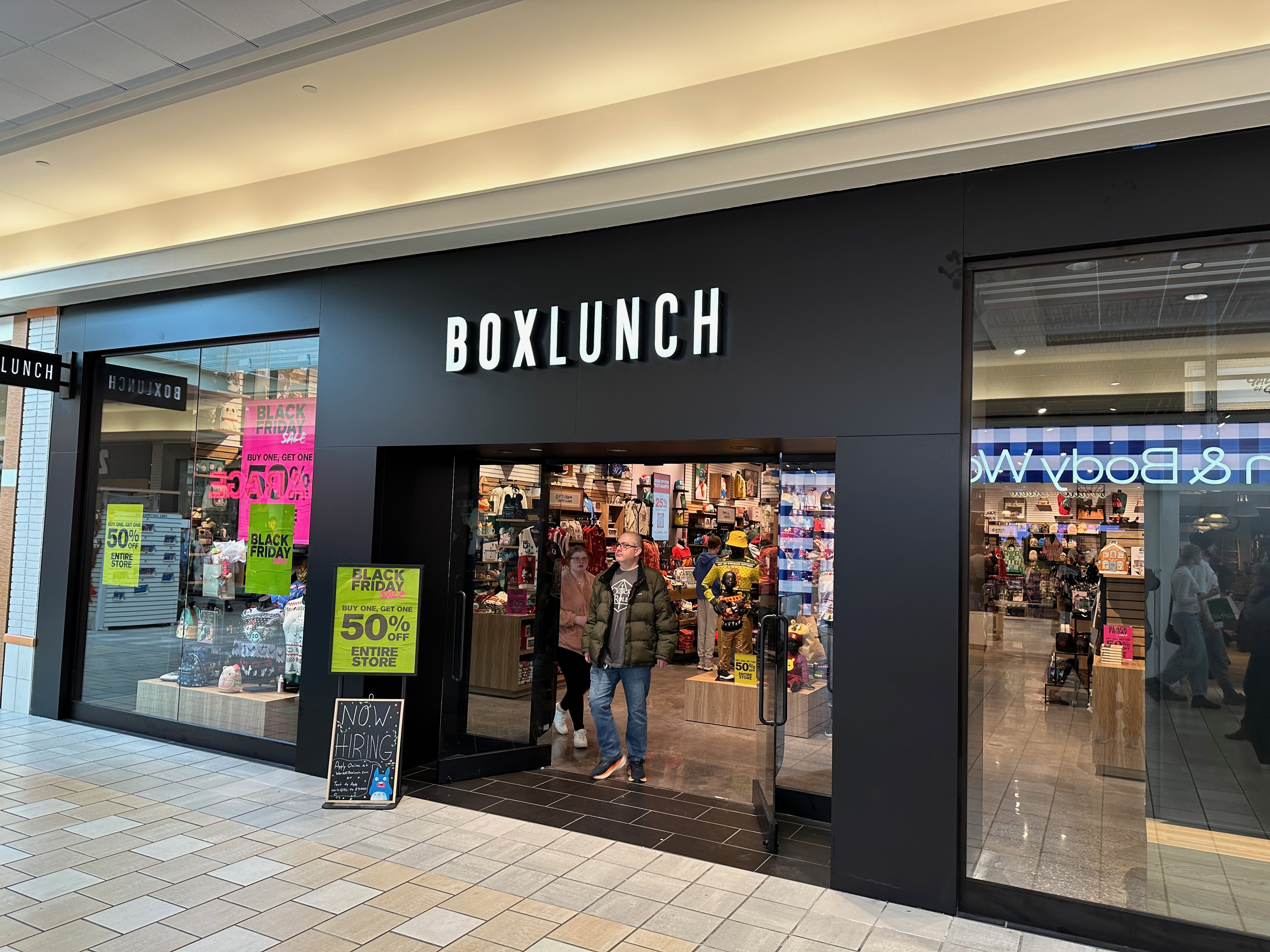
BoxLunch opened next to Team Spirit in 2023

Also in 2009, the mall's owner, General Growth Properties, filed for bankruptcy. It split itself into two companies the following year, the new one being Brookfield Properties.

On December 12, 2012, The Bon-Ton announced plans to open a store in the former Filene's space, which had been vacant since 2006. The store opened on September 12, 2013. This was Bon-Ton's only store in Maine and joined Sears, Macy's, and JCPenney to become the mall's fourth full-line department store.On June 13, 2017, it was announced that Bon-Ton would be closing its store in August 2017.

On December 6, 2017, it was announced that Round One Entertainment will be opening in the former Sports Authority space in 2018.

On May 28, 2019, Jordan's Furniture announced that it would be opening in the former Filene's/Bon-Ton space; the store opened in 2020, and features a ropes course before the main entrance from the mall.

On June 26, 2020, it was announced that Sears would be closing 28 stores nationwide, including the store in The Maine Mall. The Sears store subsequently closed on September 13, 2020. Forever 21 also closed in 2020.

In September 2023, the first Maine location of Miniso opened at the mall.

In 2025, Dick’s Sporting Goods purchased the old Sears building and is actively planning on opening a store at the site.

=== Shooting ===
A shooting occurred at the mall on February 5, 2025. A man was shot in the restrooms adjacent to the food court. He was taken to the hospital with non-life-threatening injuries to his leg. A 20-year-old man was named as a suspect by the police the following day. He surrendered to police the same day.

== Future ==
In November 2020, a proposed plan that hoped to transform a surplus of empty parking spaces at the Maine Mall into land for housing and recreation was detailed in the Portland Press Herald.

The Maine Mall Transit Oriented District Concept Plan was started by the Greater Portland Council of Governments and funded by a $20,000 federal grant. To make the mall more sustainable and attractive, the plan aims to accomplish three things: to reduce urban sprawl, reduce traffic congestion, and increase public transportation in the area around the mall.

The redevelopment plans for the Maine Mall hope to build on similar projects in the Greater Portland area, such as Rock Row in Westbrook. City organizers are hoping to take advantage of recent zoning changes that allows for housing development near the mall.

Transit-oriented development is at the center of such plans. The city already has five different bus routes that makes routine stops at the mall. The goal is to incentivize people to walk or use public transportation in the future.

The mall would still be the main attraction but will feature a more community-centered shopping experience. Through infill development, people will be able to live, work, go to the doctors, and have recreational activities all within proximity of the mall. The hope is that this will make people want to go to the mall. In the proposed plan, the parking lots at the Maine Mall will be replaced with parking garages that have green spaces on their rooftop. A hotel, convention center, parks, and a baseball field are also a part of the plan.

== Transportation ==
Two local bus companies serve the mall: Greater Portland Metro's routes 3, 5, 24A and 24B; and the number 60 of Biddeford Saco Old Orchard Beach Transit's Green line. Each service stops at JCPenney. When run by South Portland Bus Service, prior to its merging with Metro in late 2024, the 24A and 24B made an additional stop at Macy's.

In 2024, Metro created a direct route (still route 5) to the mall, running alongside its existing routes there.

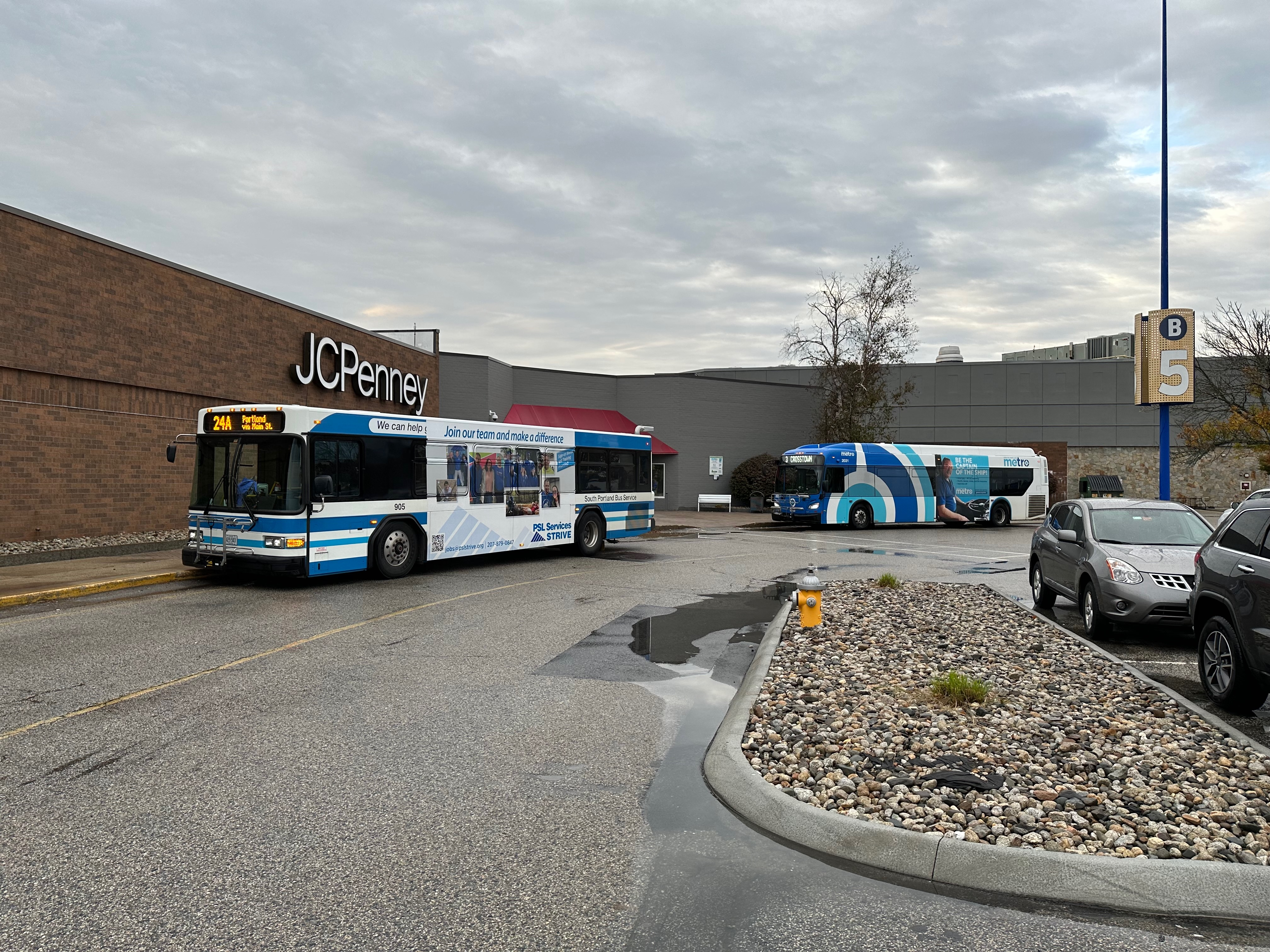
South Portland Bus Service's route 24A and Greater Portland Metro's route 3 at the mall (2023)

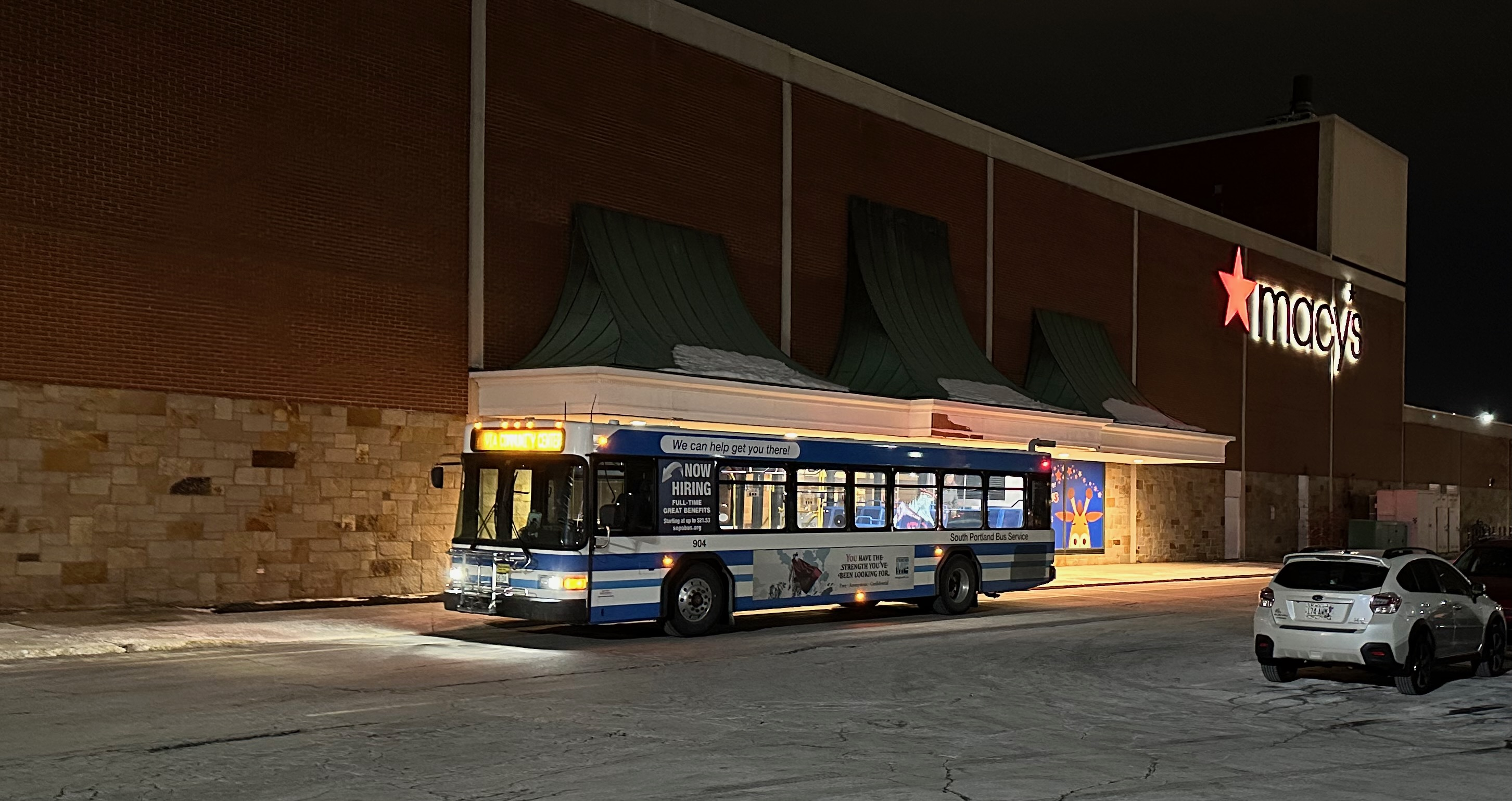
And at Macy's in early 2024
