= List of largest shopping malls in New England =

This is a list of enclosed shopping malls in the New England region of the United States

#	Mall name	City	State	Retail space Square feet (ft^{2})	Stores	Anchor stores/entertainment venues	Year opened	Ownership
1	Natick Mall	Natick, Massachusetts	Massachusetts	1,695,884	214	Nordstrom, Macy's, Dave & Buster's,Level 99	1966	Brookfield Properties Retail Group
2	Central Vermont Marketplace	Berlin, Vermont	Vermont	330,000	6	Kohl's, Walmart	1987	Heidenberg Properties
3	Green Mountain	Saint Johnsbury, Vermont	Vermont	195,400		Ocean State Job Lot	1974	
4	The Mall at Rockingham Park	Salem, New Hampshire	New Hampshire	1,024,159	144	JCPenney, Macy's, Dick's Sporting Goods, Cinemark	1991	Simon Property Group
5	Pheasant Lane Mall	Nashua, New Hampshire	New Hampshire	979,427	139	JCPenney, Target, Macy's, Dick's Sporting Goods	1986	Simon Property Group
6	The Mall of New Hampshire	Manchester, New Hampshire	New Hampshire	798,881	125	Macy's, JCPenney, Best Buy, Dick's Sporting Goods, Old Navy, Dave & Buster's	1971	Simon Property Group
7	The Maine Mall	South Portland, Maine	Maine	1,009,044	118	JCPenney, Macy's, Best Buy, Jordan's Furniture, Round One Entertainment	1971	Brookfield Properties Retail Group
8	Bangor Mall	Bangor, Maine	Maine	653,000	52	JCPenney, Dick's Sporting Goods, Furniture, Mattress and More	1978	Namdar Reality Group
9	Aroostook Centre Mall	Presque Isle, Maine	Maine	525,000	30+	JCPenney	1993	Kohan Retail Investment Group
10	Auburn Mall	Auburn, Maine	Maine	300,000	50	JCPenney	1979	George Schott
11	Providence Place	Providence, Rhode Island	Rhode Island	1,237,425	150	Macy's, Boscov's	1999	Brookfield Properties Retail Group
12	Warwick Mall	Warwick, Rhode Island	Rhode Island	1,000,000	80+	Macy's, JCPenney, Target, Jordan's Furniture, Nordstrom Rack, Old Navy, Golf Galaxy, Off Broadway Shoes	1970	Warwick Mall LLC
15	South Shore Plaza	Braintree, Massachusetts	Massachusetts	2,165,000	176	Nordstrom, Macy's, Target, Sears, Primark, H&M	1961	Simon Property Group, LLC
16	Holyoke Mall at Ingleside	Holyoke, Massachusetts	Massachusetts	1,600,000	151	Macy's, JCPenney, Target, Best Buy, Christmas Tree Shops, Burlington, Hobby Lobby, Round One Entertainment	1979	The Pyramid Companies
18	Northshore Mall	Peabody, Massachusetts	Massachusetts	1,385,195	163	Nordstrom, Macy's (2 stores), JCPenney, DSW	1958	Simon Property Group
19	Burlington Mall	Burlington, Massachusetts	Massachusetts	1,264,825	176	Nordstrom, Macy's, Primark	1961	Simon Property Group
20	Copley Place	Boston, Massachusetts	Massachusetts	1,259,063	80	Neiman Marcus, Saks Fifth Avenue	1983	Simon Property Group
21	Emerald Square	North Attleboro, Massachusetts	Massachusetts	1,022,295	126	Macy's (2 stores), JCPenney	1989	JLL-Retail
22	CambridgeSide	Cambridge, Massachusetts	Massachusetts	1,000,000	80	Best Buy, TJ Maxx, H&M	1990	New England Development
23	Square One Mall	Saugus, Massachusetts	Massachusetts	930,279	125	Macy's, Dick's Sporting Goods, Best Buy, TJ Maxx, BD's Furniture	1994	Simon Property Group
24	Solomon Pond Mall	Marlborough, Massachusetts	Massachusetts	886,596	105	Macy's, JCPenney, Regal Cinemas	1996	Simon Property Group
25	Liberty Tree Mall	Danvers, Massachusetts	Massachusetts	854,451	66	Marshalls, Best Buy, Target, Kohl's, Nordstrom Rack, Dick's Sporting Goods, Total Wine, Staples, Dollar Tree, The Home Depot	1967	Simon Property Group
26	Kingston Collection	Kingston, Massachusetts	Massachusetts	834,575	84	Macy's, Target, Regal Cinemas	1989	The Pyramid Companies
28	Cape Cod Mall	Barnstable, Massachusetts	Massachusetts	723,605	82	Macy's (2 stores), Target, Dick's Sporting Goods, Marshalls, Regal Cinemas, Best Buy, Barnes & Noble	1970	Simon Property Group
29	The Mall at Whitney Field	Leominster, Massachusetts	Massachusetts	700,000	75	JCPenney, Burlington	1967	Hull Property Group
30	Dartmouth Mall	North Dartmouth, Massachusetts	Massachusetts	670,940	54	Macy's, JCPenney, Burlington, Aldi (opening 2021)	1971	PREIT
31	Westgate Mall	Brockton, Massachusetts	Massachusetts	600,000	65+	Burlington, Dick's Sporting Goods, Planet Fitness, Old Navy, PCX Apparel, Liam's Home Furniture, Bath and Body Works, Jo-Ann Fabrics, Famous Footwear, Market Basket	1963	New England Development
32	Auburn Mall	Auburn, Massachusetts	Massachusetts	583,739	71	Macy's	1961	Simon Property Group
33	The Shops at Prudential Center*	Boston, Massachusetts	Massachusetts	500,914	75	Saks Fifth Avenue	1993	Boston Properties
34	The Shops at Chestnut Hill	Newton, Massachusetts	Massachusetts	470,067	55	Bloomingdale's (2 stores)	1974	Simon Property Group
35	Hampshire Mall	Hadley, Massachusetts	Massachusetts	456,242	55+	Target, JCPenney, Dick's Sporting Goods, PetSmart, Cinemark	1978	The Pyramid Companies
36	Watertown Mall	Watertown, Massachusetts	Massachusetts	250,000		Target, Best Buy	1975	
37	Connecticut Post Mall	Milford, Connecticut	Connecticut	1,334,000	215	Macy's, Target, Boscov's, Dick's Sporting Goods, Dave & Buster's, Cinemark	1960	Centennial Real Estate Montgomery Street Partners USAA Real Estate
38	Danbury Fair	Danbury, Connecticut	Connecticut	1,292,176	192	Macy's, JCPenney, Dick's Sporting Goods, Primark	1986	The Macerich Company
39	Westfarms	West Hartford, Connecticut	Connecticut	1,271,000	160	Macy's (2 stores), Nordstrom, JCPenney	1974	The Taubman Company
40	Brass Mill Center	Waterbury, Connecticut	Connecticut	1,179,569	130	JCPenney, Burlington, Shoppers World, TJ Maxx, Regal Cinemas	1997	Brookfield Properties Retail Group
41	Westfield Trumbull	Trumbull, Connecticut	Connecticut	1,130,690	169	Macy's, Target, JCPenney	1964	Unibail-Rodamco-Westfield
42	The Shoppes at Buckland Hills	Manchester, Connecticut	Connecticut	1,072,766	128	Macy's (2 stores), JCPenney, Dick's Sporting Goods, Barnes & Noble	1990	Brookfield Properties Retail Group
43	Meriden Mall	Meriden, Connecticut	Connecticut	894,435	142	Boscov's, Best Buy, Dick's Sporting Goods, TJ Maxx, Old Navy, Ulta Beauty	1971	Unibail-Rodamco-Westfield
44	Stamford Town Center*	Norwalk, Connecticut	Connecticut	853,000	130	Macy's, Saks OFF 5TH	1982	F.D. Rich Co.
45	Enfield Square	Enfield, Connecticut	Connecticut	788,000	54	Target	1971	Namdar Realty Group
46	Crystal Mall	Waterford, Connecticut	Connecticut	782,995	103	JCPenney, Christmas Tree Shops	1984	Simon Property Group
47	The SoNo Collection	Norwalk, Connecticut	Connecticut	717,000	89	Nordstrom, Bloomingdale's	2019	Brookfield Properties Retail Group
48	Hawley Lane Mall	Trumbull, Connecticut	Connecticut	462,000	18	Target, Kohl's, HomeGoods, Best Buy	1971	National Realty and Development Corp.
49	East Brook Mall	Mansfield, Connecticut	Connecticut	281,063	27	Kohl's, TJ Maxx	1975	
50	University Mall	South Burlington, Vermont	Vermont	610,693	25	Kohl's, JCPenney, Target, H&M	1979	Finard Properties, LLC

This is a list of outlet shopping malls in the New England.

#	Mall name	City	State	Retail space Square feet (ft^{2})	Stores	Anchor stores/entertainment venues	Year opened	Ownership
1	Wrentham Village Premium Outlets	Wrentham, Massachusetts	Massachusetts	660,186	170	Bloomingdale's, Restoration Hardware, Saks OFF 5TH	1997	Simon Property Group
2	Settlers Green	North Conway, New Hampshire	New Hampshire	500,000	60	Market Basket (coming soon)	1988	OVP Management, Inc.
3	Merrimack Premium Outlets	Merrimack, New Hampshire	New Hampshire	408,902	100	Bloomingdale's, Saks OFF 5TH	2012	Simon Property Group
4	Tanger Outlets Foxwoods	Mashantucket, Connecticut	Connecticut	311,593	60	H&M	2015	Tanger Factory Outlet Centers
5	Clinton Premium Outlets	Clinton, Connecticut	Connecticut	276,101	70	Saks OFF 5TH	1996	Simon Property Group
6	Westbrook Outlets	Westbrook, Connecticut	Connecticut	290,000	65	H&M, Madison Furniture Barn	1995	Levin Management
7	Kittery Premium Outlets	Kittery, Maine	Maine	259,221	61		1983	Simon Property Group
8	Tanger Outlets Tilton	Tilton, New Hampshire	New Hampshire	250,107				Tanger Factory Outlet Centers
9	Lee Premium Outlets	Lee, Massachusetts	Massachusetts	224,846	60	Forever 21, Old Navy, Solomon's Bedding and Furniture Outlet	1997	Simon Property Group
10	Manchester Designer Outlets	Manchester, Vermont	Vermont	135,000				

== Former shopping malls ==
The following shopping malls have been demolished or closed. Some have been replaced by new strip plazas or re-developed for non-retail uses:

Mall name	City	Region	Retail space Square feet (ft²)	Stores	Anchor stores/entertainment venues	Year opened	Year closed	Ownership	Notes
CityPlace Burlington*	Burlington, Vermont	Vermont			Macy's, LL Bean	1976	2022	Devonwood Investors	
Eastfield Mall	Springfield, Massachusetts	Massachusetts	824,000	75	Old Navy	1967		Mountain Development Corp.	
Mall at Fox Run	Newington, New Hampshire	New Hampshire	603,618	84	JCPenney, Macy's (2 stores)	1983	2026	Spinoso Real Estate Group	
Steeplegate Mall	Concord, New Hampshire	New Hampshire	480,000	33	JCPenney	1990		Namdar Realty Group	

- Denotes urban mall

== See also ==
- List of largest enclosed shopping malls in Canada
- List of largest shopping malls in the United States
- List of largest shopping malls in the world
