= Auburn Mall =

Auburn Mall may refer to:

- Auburn Mall (Alabama) in Auburn, Alabama
- Auburn Mall (Maine) in Auburn, Maine
- Auburn Mall (Massachusetts) in Auburn, Massachusetts
