= Denholm & McKay =

Department store in Massachusetts, US

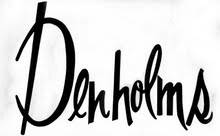
- Industry: Retail
- Founded: 1871
- Defunct: 1973
- Fate: Bankruptcy
- Successor: Forbes & Wallace
- Headquarters: Worcester, Massachusetts
- Products: Clothing, footwear, bedding, furniture, jewelry, beauty products, and housewares.
- Website: None

Denholm & McKay Co. was a department store located in Worcester, Massachusetts. The store was a dominant retailer in Central Massachusetts. The store was popularly known as Denholm's or the Boston Store. The company was founded by William Alexander Denholm in 1870. Denholm purchased the dry-goods business of Finley, Lawson, & Kennedy located on the corner of Main and Mechanic street in Worcester. He partnered with Bostonian William C. McKay, which proved to be very successful. In twelve years Denholm and McKay had grown into a retailing giant. That year, the company moved into a new huge quarters specially built for them. Denholm's held a reputation as the biggest store of its kind in New England outside Boston and Providence, Rhode Island. In 1954 with Harry F. Wolf of Shrewsbury, Mass. as president from 1946-1966 (ref. The Story of Worcester's Premier Department Store) the old victorian style facade from 1882 was replaced with a new ultra-modern one, which remains mostly the same today. In 1963 Harry Wolf also has the first escalator installed in the city of Worcester to make shopping easier for customers. (ref. The Story of Worcester's Premier Department Store). Wolf was a perfectionist and one of the main reasons the store was so successful and profitable from the 1880s thru the early 1960s Sadly in 1966 with Wolf's passing the great store went into decline.(Ref. The Story of Worcester's Premier Department Store). In 1961 Denholm's tore down existing buildings it already owned on High Street and constructed the High Street annex entrance and parking lot. and in 1963 the company purchased the historic former downtown YWCA building on Chatham Street they reconditioned and merged the structures into the main street store this remodel included boarding over the old YWCA Swimming pool to build more retail flooring. In 1970, Denholm's opened its first and only branch at the Auburn Mall, just south of Worcester in Auburn, Massachusetts. In 1969, Gladdings Department Store of Providence merged with Denholm & Mckay. In the Early 1970s the Denholm's was declining with the new modern Worcester Center Galleria mall that opened in 1971 it completely stole Denholm's downtown customer base turning Main Street into a retail ghost town and the new Auburn ma Denholm's location also drew customers away from its main store. so both stores closed in 1973 due to bankruptcy. The store in downtown Worcester was converted into an office complex, but still bears the Denholm name. The store in the Auburn Mall was converted into a Forbes & Wallace of Springfield, Massachusetts.

The building hung on as office space until 2023, when the Worcester Redevelopment Authority sold it to the Menkiti Group, whose plan is to demolish the building in late 2026 and wrap up by July 2027, and erect housing units in its place.
