= Eastfield Mall =

Defunct mall in Springfield, Massachusetts, U.S.

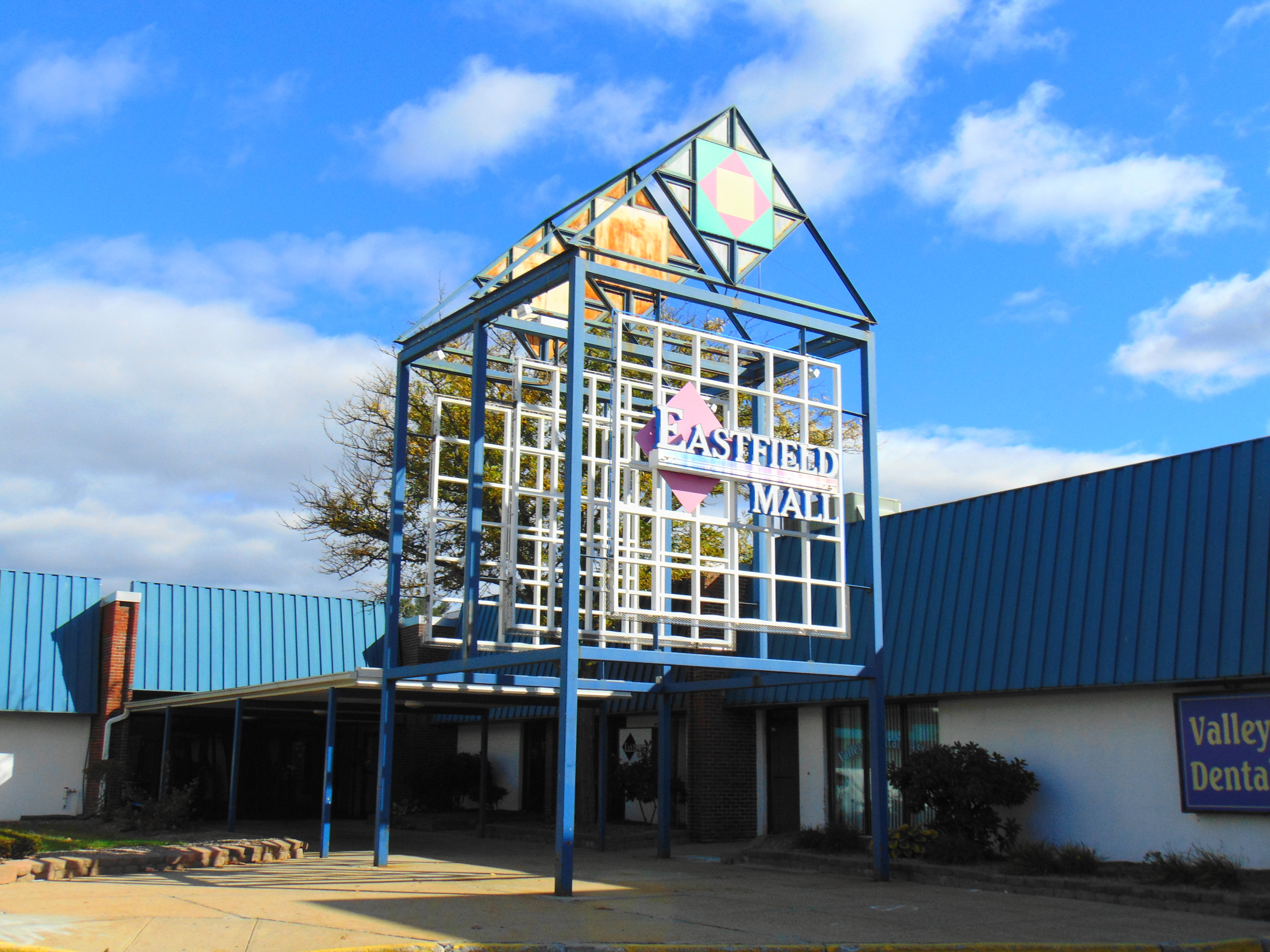
- Entrance to the mall (October 2018)
- Location: Springfield, Massachusetts, U.S.
- Coordinates: 42.1416°N 72.4868°W
- Opened: April 1, 1968; 58 years ago
- Closed: July 15, 2023; 3 years ago
- Demolished: August 2023 – February 2024
- Developer: The Rouse Company
- Owner: Onyx Partners
- Architect: Daverman & Associates
- Num. of stores: 70+ (at peak)
- Num. of anchor tenants: 4 (at peak)
- Floor area: 825,000 square feet (76,645.0 m^{2})
- Floors: 1 (2 in all anchors)

The Eastfield Mall was a shopping mall in Springfield, Massachusetts, that was developed in 1967 by the Rouse Company. At its peak, it was anchored by JCPenney, Macy's, Sears, and a Cinemark movie theater. Opened in 1968, it was the first enclosed mall in the Western Massachusetts region and the largest in Connecticut and Massachusetts until the opening of Holyoke Mall at Ingleside in 1979.

The mall was sold in 1998 to Mountain Development Corporation, who managed the property. After the closure of the mall's anchor tenants in the 2010s, the Eastfield Mall was purchased by Onyx Partners in 2023 with the desire to redevelop the property. The mall closed in July 2023, and the building was demolished, with the exception of the separately-owned former Sears anchor.

The property was redeveloped into Springfield Crossing, an open air shopping center with anchor tenants BJ's Wholesale Club, Hobby Lobby, Chick-fil-A, and Target. The first phase of construction was completed in December 2025, with additional tenants opening the following year.

== History ==
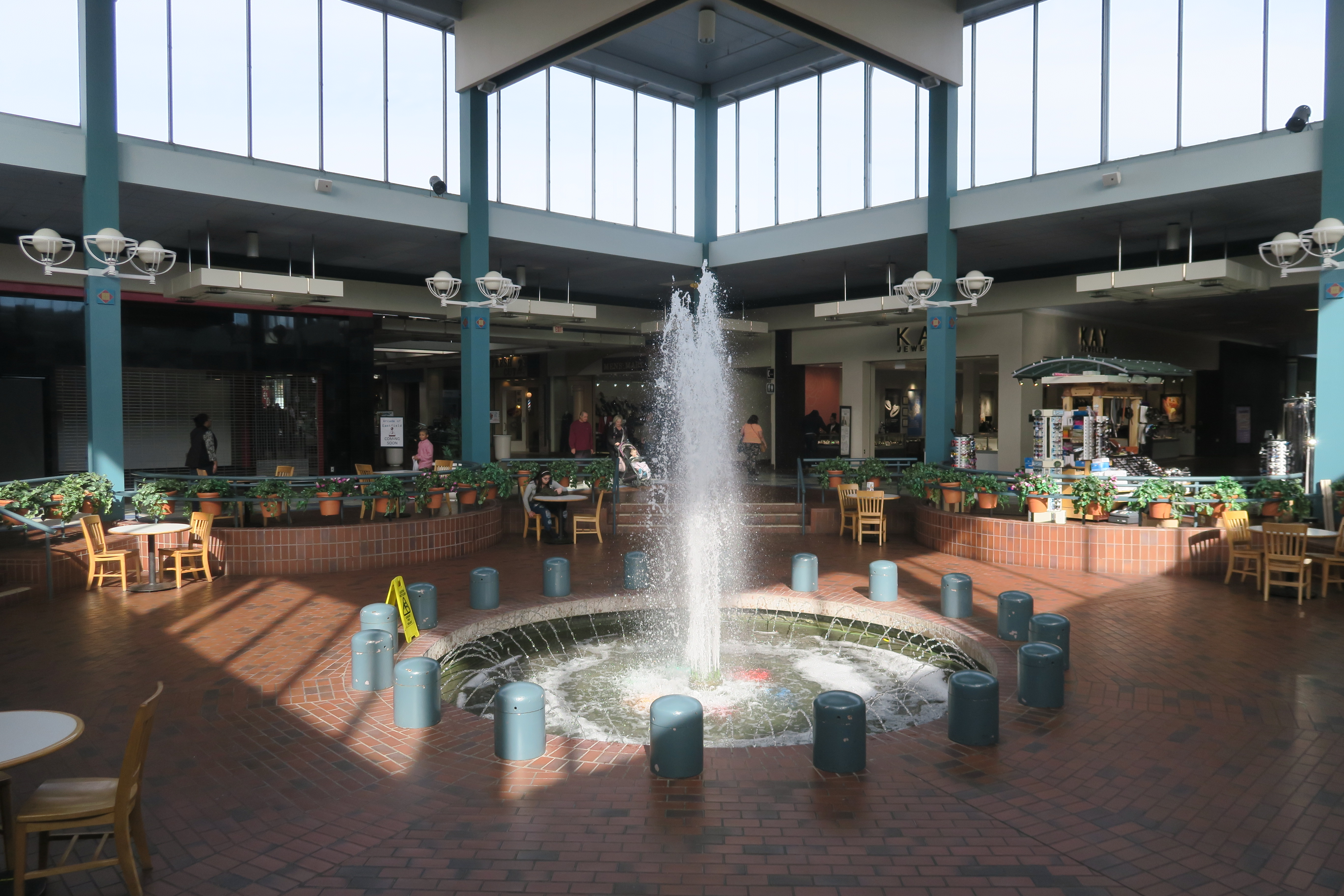
Indoor fountain at the food court (February 2018)

=== Development ===
The Eastfield Mall was the 11th enclosed shopping mall developed by the Rouse Company of Baltimore, Maryland, and the first enclosed mall in the Western Massachusetts region. The chosen location was close to exit 7 of the Massachusetts Turnpike and accessible to several communities, including Springfield, Ludlow, Wilbraham, Longmeadow, and East Longmeadow. Connecticut General Life Insurance Company agreed to $6 million permanent financing of the mall.

The mall was designed by Daverman & Associates, an architectural firm based in Grand Rapids, Michigan. The structure was L-shaped and air conditioned, featuring four interior courts with fountains, kiosks, tropical plants, and trees. Aviaries that housed several birds were initially present, but they were later rehoused amid protests from animal rights activists. Stairs within the mall connected the anchor tenants to the structure. The entrance pavilions were free-standing units, constructed with canvas canopies on metal frames, and the exterior had mansard roof line. A community center was also constructed in the mall, with adjacent kitchen facilities and a capacity of 300 people. The completed structure was 724,000 square feet (67,300 m^{2}) and cost $15 million. Plans for the Eastfield Mall were announced in June 1965, and a groundbreaking ceremony was held on July 1, 1965.

The Eastfield Mall opened on April 1, 1968, with three anchor tenants: the local department stores Forbes & Wallace and Steiger's, along with Sears, which included an auto repair center. Sears occupied the west side of the mall and Forbes and Wallace occupied the east side. The anchor tenants owned their own stores and parking lots, an arrangement that continued after Forbes & Wallace and Steiger's closed. In addition to its anchors, the mall opened with 64 retail tenants and a twin cinemas movie theater. To promote the mall, events were held to draw crowds to the novelty of the enclosed shopping mall, including a 'ball at the mall' at New Year's Eve and costumed characters during George Washington's birthday.

In 1974, the Rouse Company planned to expand the mall with the addition of JCPenney, but the Springfield planning board voted against the expansion based on a 1972 policy that it would not approve development in outlying areas until downtown retail was revitalized. Expansion plans were scrapped. Forbes & Wallace closed in August 1976, marking the chain's third closure in the region. JCPenney acquired the space three days later, and the store opened in August 1977. In 1994, Steiger's closed following its acquisition by May Department Stores, which converted the store into its Filene's brand. The store became Macy's in 2006 after May was purchased by Federated Department Stores, Macy's parent company at the time.

With the opening of Holyoke Mall at Ingleside in 1979 and other malls nearby, the novelty of the Eastfield Mall wore off. Criticism was directed towards the city's decision to deny the Eastfield Mall's expansion in 1974, stating that "the city's stand ultimately gave away tax revenue to Holyoke", according to The Republican. The Eastfield Mall suffered in the late 1980s and early 1990s, as the Rouse Company was not willing to invest into the mall, according to BusinessWest and mall general manager Arlene Putnam. A $6 million interior renovation in 1986 updated the mall and added a food court, built on the site of the original theater. Brett Construction was awarded the project, entailing 15,000 square feet (1,400 m^{2}) of new construction and about 90,000 square feet (8,400 m^{2}) of renovation.

=== Mountain Development Group ===
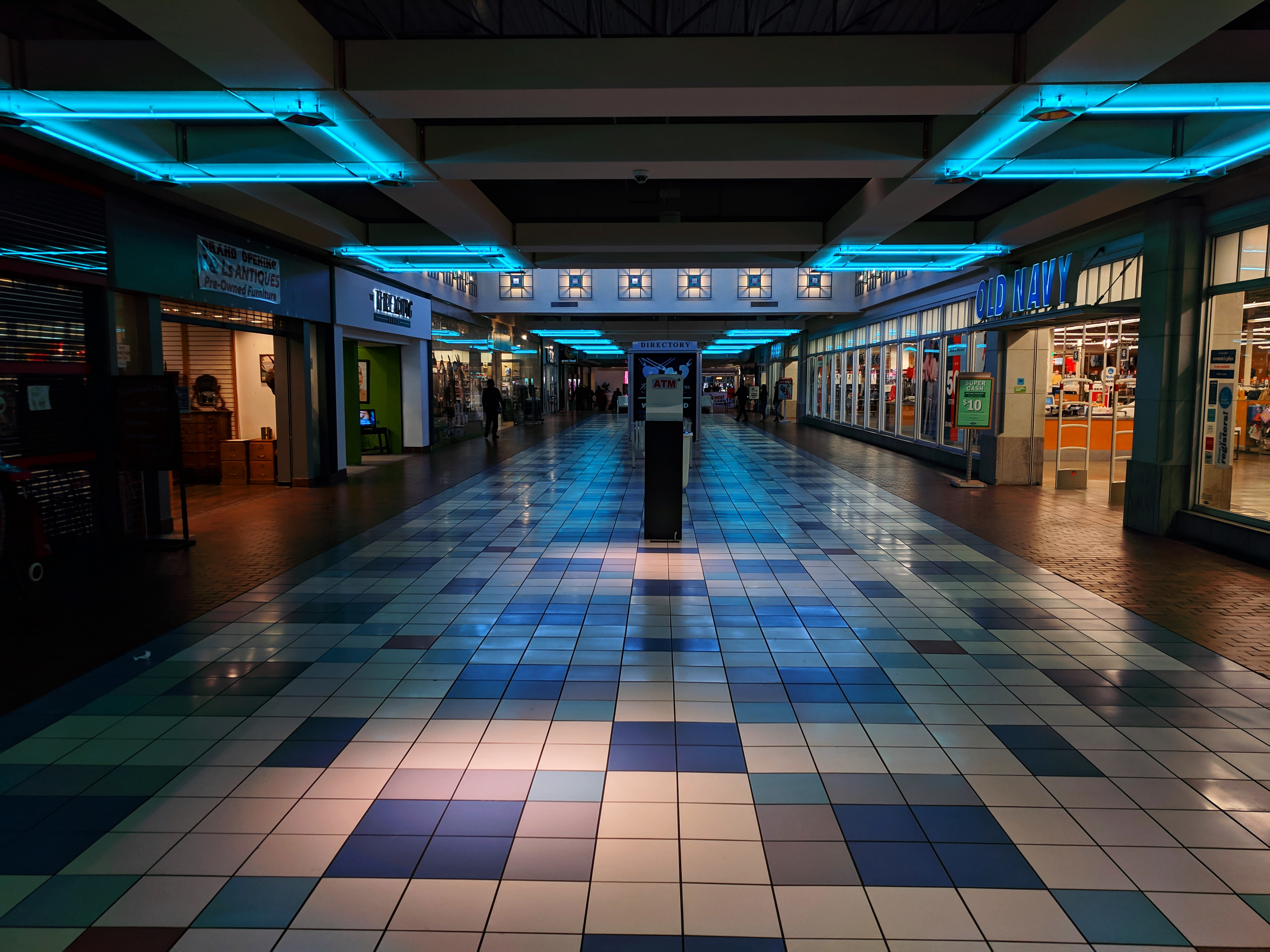
Interior corridor (February 2019)

In April 1998, the mall was purchased by New Jersey-based Mountain Development group, which also managed the mall through an internal division. The mall was around 50% leased at the time of its sale. To keep up with competing malls like Holyoke Mall at Ingleside and coinciding with residential growth in communities east of the mall, including Wilbraham, Monson, and Belchertown, Mountain Development invested $30 million into mall renovations. Additions included new restaurants and retail options, along with interior lighting and new flooring.

A fourth anchor tenant, a 16-screen Showcase Cinemas theater was constructed during renovations, funded jointly by Mountain Development and Showcase Cinemas parent company National Amusements. The theater opened in August 1999 and later became owned by Cinemark. The addition of a Steve & Barry's clothing store in 2006 put the mall at full occupancy for the first time since 1978. The store displaced nine smaller retail outlets, of which only two relocated within the mall.

In 2004, the mall implemented a teen escort policy, stating that any customer under the age of 15 must be with an escort after 5:00 PM.

The mall's four anchor tenants closed in the final years of the mall's operations. JCPenney was replaced by a Penney's outlet store and closed in 2011 when JCPenney eliminated its outlet store division. On January 6, 2016, Macy's announced that it would be closing their store as part of a plan to close 36 stores nationwide. The location was 127,000 square feet (11,800 m^{2}) and had two levels. Mountain Development purchased both closed anchor tenants and their parking lots after their closing: JCPenney for $3.5 million in 2013, and Macy's for $1 million in 2017. The structure was 125,000 square feet (11,600 m^{2}) and had two floors. On September 2, 2018, Sears closed its store as part of a plan to close 78 stores nationwide. Its store was 97,000 square feet (9,000 m^{2}) and had one floor with a basement level. In June 2020, Cinemark closed permanently and dismantled the space to prevent a competitor from filling it, leading to a lawsuit between Cinemark and the Eastfield Mall was settled in February 2022.

The vacant anchor tenant space was used intermittently after their stores' closures. While the city granted permission to destroy the former JCPenney in 2015, the space was used for a number of short-term tenants, including Spirit Halloween. During the COVID-19 pandemic, a COVID-19 vaccination site operated in the former Macy's, and the Commonwealth of Massachusetts Court System conducted jury trials in three of the sixteen theaters of the shuttered Cinemark.

=== Redevelopment plans and closure ===
In 2018, Mountain Development hired the real-estate brokerage firm Cushman and Wakefield in a joint-venture partnership to redevelop the property into mixed-use development. The concept plan for the proposed complex, dubbed Eastfield Commons, included 23 residential buildings, retail, office, and services, along with maintaining the existing theater and food court. Mountain Development projected the redevelopment to cost $200 million.

Following the closure of the mall's anchor tenants, Mountain Development tried new attractions to attract customers, including a flea market and pro-wrestling. According to manager David Thompson, "the rents were too low ... and when utility costs went up, it just wouldn't work". In March 2023, it was reported that developers Onyx Partners, based in Needham, Massachusetts, had a contract in place to purchase the mall. The project was supported by Springfield mayor Domenic Sarno. On April 5, 2023, the city of Springfield confirmed that the mall would shutter after almost 56 years. In an agreement with the city, Onyx Partners provided $500,000 to waive the rent and utilities fees for the mall's 43 remaining tenants until its closure. The mall's last day of operations was July 15, 2023. Demolition of the structure began in August 2023 and was completed in February 2024. The shuttered Sears and Sears Auto Center were the only structures retained from the mall, as they were sold in 2020 to Eastern Retail Properties. As of August 2026, the shuttered Sears is still vacant.

== Springfield Crossing ==
The Eastfield Mall property was acquired and redeveloped by Onyx Partners into Springfield Crossing, an outdoor shopping center. In October 2023, Western Mass News reported a billboard had been erected at the old site, advertising the opening of the new development in Summer 2025.

To help support development costs, the Springfield city council unanimously approved $8 million in funding on June 2, 2025, to establish a 34-acre (14 ha) development district on the project's land using Massachusetts's District Improvement Financing. Springfield Crossing originally had a planned completion date of summer 2025, and it was originally proposed as a mixed-use project. The Springfield city council worked with Onyx Partners to dedicate opportunities for small businesses in the new shopping center, like those that had been present at the Eastfield Mall. A $50 million loan was secured for the project in early 2025.

Development occurred in phases, the first of which was valued at $77 million and the full project at $146 million, according to Onyx. Construction on the BJ's Wholesale Club store, its first store in Springfield, began in July 2025.

A ribbon cutting ceremony for the completion of the mall's phase 1 of construction was held on December 15, 2025, attended by Springfield mayor Domenic Sarno as well as other state officials. The mall held its grand opening on December 17. The shopping center contains 386,727 square feet (35,928.1 m^{2}) of shopping space and 1,627 parking spaces. Anchor tenants include BJ's Wholesale Club, Hobby Lobby, and Chick-fil-A. A second phase introduced several retailers, including Springfield's first Target location as an anchor store, which opened in July 2026.
