= Mountain Farms Mall =

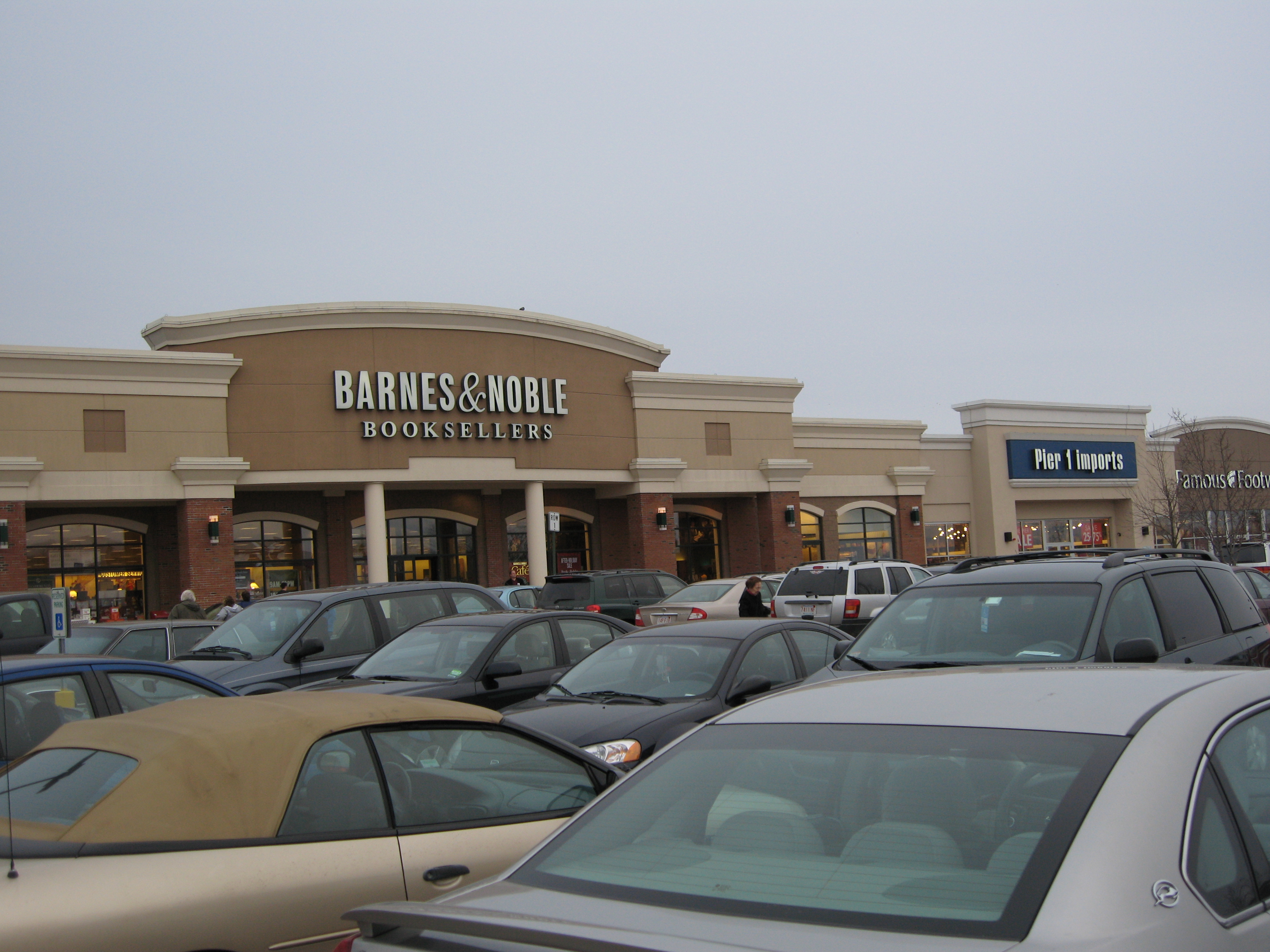
- View of one end of the mall in 2007
- Location: Hadley, Massachusetts, United States
- Coordinates: 42°21′14″N 72°33′13″W
- Address: 335 Russell Street
- Opened: November 23, 1973; 52 years ago
- Developer: the Pyramid Cos.
- Manager: Ed Cabitt
- Owner: WS Development
- Num. of stores: 20+
- Num. of anchor tenants: 9
- Floor area: 395,065 square feet (36,703 m^{2})
- Floors: 1
- Parking: 1745
- Website: www.mountainfarmshadley.com

Mountain Farms Mall is a shopping center in Hadley, Massachusetts, United States, with approximately 12 stores. It is located on Route 9, at 335 Russell Street in Hadley, Massachusetts, between Amherst and Northampton, approximately five miles east of Exit 19 off I-91. The mall is owned by S.R. Weiner and WS Development.

== History ==
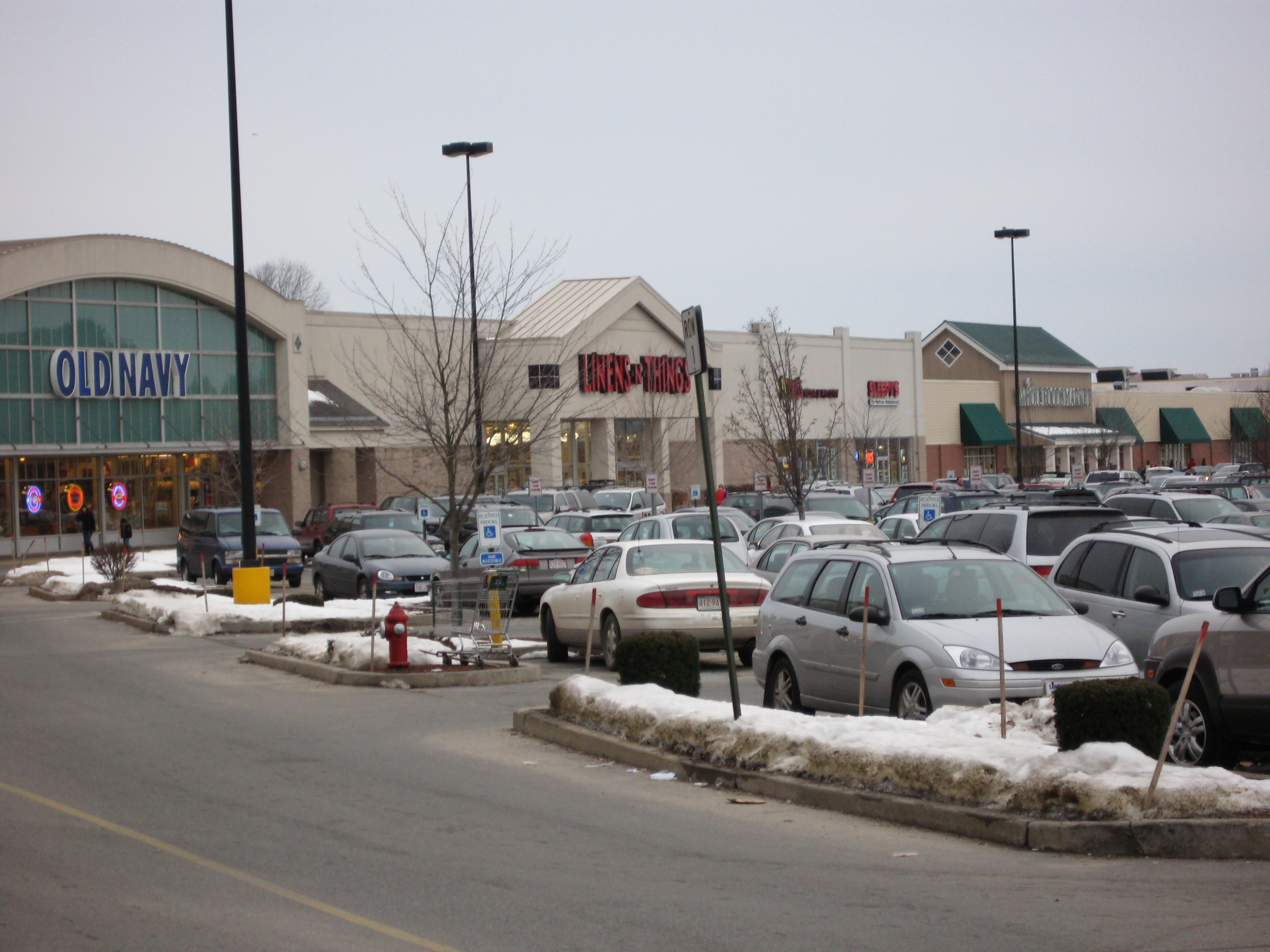
View of the other end of the mall in 2007

Mountain Farms first opened to the public on Nov. 23, 1973 as an indoor shopping mall. Original anchor stores were Woolco and Almy's.

After the neighboring Hampshire Mall opened in 1978, business at Mountain Farms fell off. In the heyday of its first incarnation were about 40 stores in the mall. By 1990, the Mountain Farms was generally referred to as "the dead mall", containing a hot tubbing location, a weekly flea market and an AMC theater. By the spring of 1994 its original 35 stores had declined to four. In May 1994 Wholesale Depot Inc. filed bankruptcy under Chapter 11 of the United States Bankruptcy Code and closed its store which opened at the mall in December 1992.

In June 1997, WS Development, an open-air shopping center developer, showed interest in refurbishing the mall and as part of this plan it envisioned devoting a third of its space to a Walmart store. The Planning Board members at the time raised concerns about the appropriateness of a Walmart in Hadley saying that they preferred small and unique stores. In 1998 permission was obtained to bring in the Walmart. In April 1998 a citizens group in Hadley filed suit against W.S. Development and the Hadley Planning Board seeking to overturn the Planning Board's decision to grant site plan approval. In July 1998 a Hampshire Superior Court justice dismissed the lawsuit.

On August 19, 1998 the mall was sold by Henry Rosenberg of New York City, trustee of MFF Realty Trust, to W.S. Hadley Properties, care of S.R. Weiner and Associates Inc. of Chestnut Hill. The buyers were sister companies of WS Development, the mall's prospective developers. Construction on the new project began in February 1999.

Peoples Bank of Holyoke purchased a boarded-up former Bess Eaton doughnut shop adjacent to the Mountain Farms Mall. Walmart opened its store in February 2000. Linens 'N Things opened its store in September 2000, and closed in 2008 after liquidating. An Old Navy opened a month later in October 2000. In 2001, Barnes & Noble opened a store in the revamped mall. In 2002 Michael's, an arts and crafts store, opened between Marshall's and Bread & Circus supermarket.

In 2003 a 16,400-square-foot (1,520 m^{2}) expansion of the Bread & Circus (which later that year was rebranded as Whole Foods Market) at Mountain Farms Mall began.

A 63-room, 27,700-square-foot (2,570 m^{2}) Econo Lodge was constructed that opened in 2003 in front of Mountain Farms Mall. During this time period the Hampshire Mall was regarded as the dead mall in comparison to the Mountain Farms Mall. A new expanded Whole Foods Market (formerly a Bread & Circus) opened in June 2004. Home Depot obtained permission for a 323,000-square-foot (30,000 m^{2}) shopping center adjacent to the mall later in the year.

In May 2006 the town voted in favor of the "Compatible Building Size Bylaw" which measure placed 75,000-square-foot (7,000 m^{2}) cap on retail building size, effectively prohibiting future malls and shopping centers from coming to the Route 9 corridor. The proposed Lowe's home improvement center, Home Depot, and Walmart Supercenter projects, all of which have already begun or completed the planning process, will not be affected. The Home Depot and Hadley Corner retail project was shut down in March 2006 by the state Department of Environmental Protection.

In 2007 construction began at the rear of the mall for a Planet Fitness which opened in 2008.

Bed, Bath, and Beyond opened in the former Linens N' Things space in November 2009.

=== Walmart controversy ===
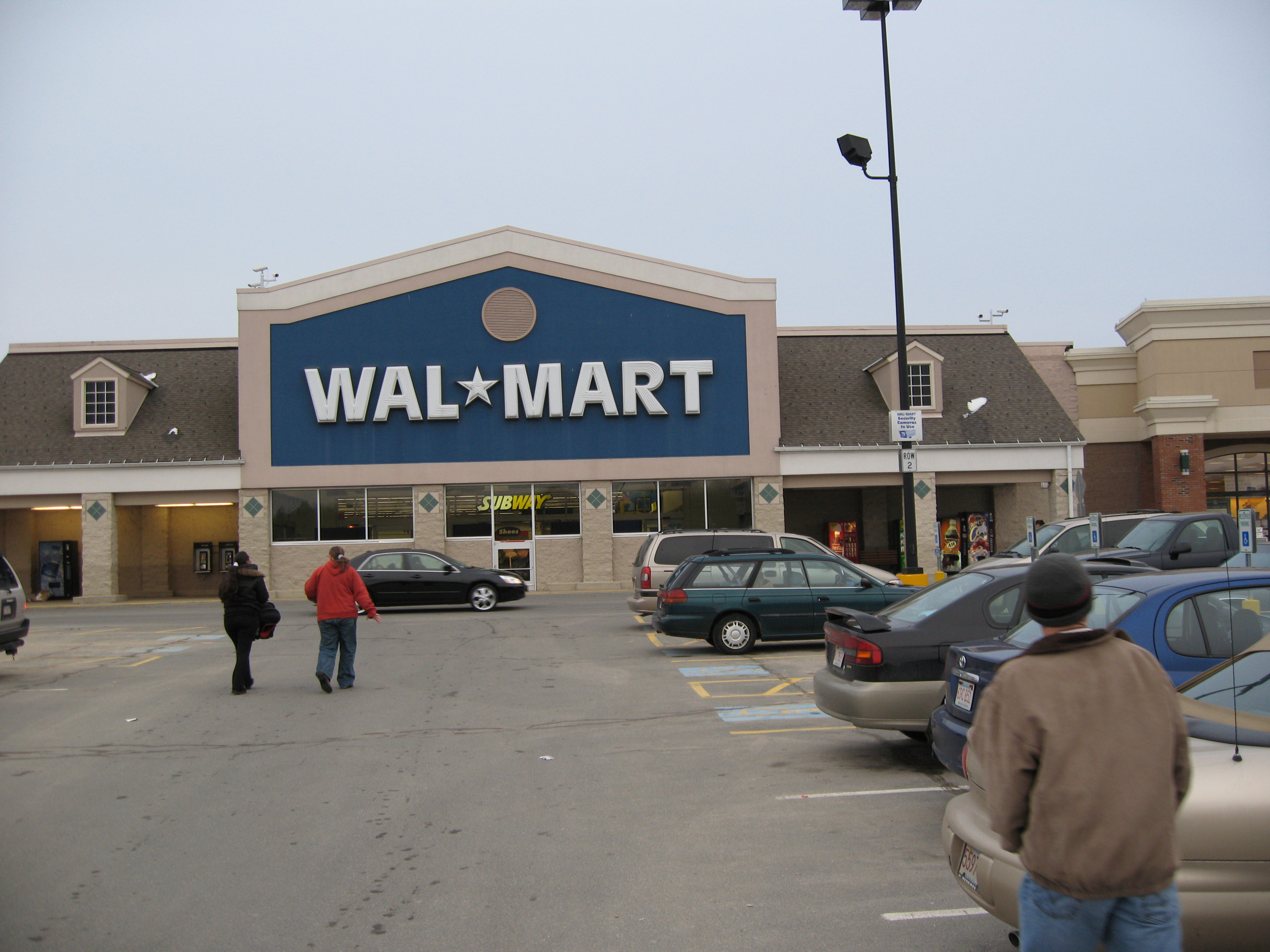
The Walmart at Mountain Farms Mall, 2007.

Starting in 1997, when Walmart started expressing interest in establishing a store, an organized group of area residents have sought to oppose any Walmart development plans, Walmart epitomizing what they oppose. In 2005 Walmart wished to build a new 212,000-square-foot (19,700 m^{2}) Supercenter southeast of the Hampshire Mall. However, there have been various hindrances as a consequence of a bylaw designed to keep out large stores by restricting new stores to 75,000 square feet (7,000 m^{2}) as well as local organized opposition. After two years of negotiations, on November 20, 2007, a subdivision plan that exempted the planned Walmart Supercenter from the current bylaw restrictions was approved. Developers were given eight years to get a site plan approved before the exemption expires. This would almost certainly mean the current store, attached to the east end of Mountain Farms Mall, would close. There continues to be tensions within the Hadley community between those that want development for shopping, business, tax and employment reasons versus those that wish to not allow any more development in order to keep Hadley as rural as possible.

The Walmart at the Mountain Farms Mall has been the scene of various demonstrations since it opened, not all of which impinged directly on Walmart. On May 2, 2004 activists picketed the store to publicize what they have called the "Walmartization of health care," and to vocalize what they saw as a need for a national health insurance plan." Some customers, however, felt harassed and complained to the store manager who called the police. Other stores in the mall also placed a call in complaint of the protest. According to the police, the protectors stopped customers from entering stores, blocked store entrances and generally annoyed the customers. It was only after a trespass order was issued to force the activists to disperse that the demonstration ended. Since then, further demonstrations have occurred on Route 9 on the edge of the Mountain Farms Mall property.
