= East Brook Mall =

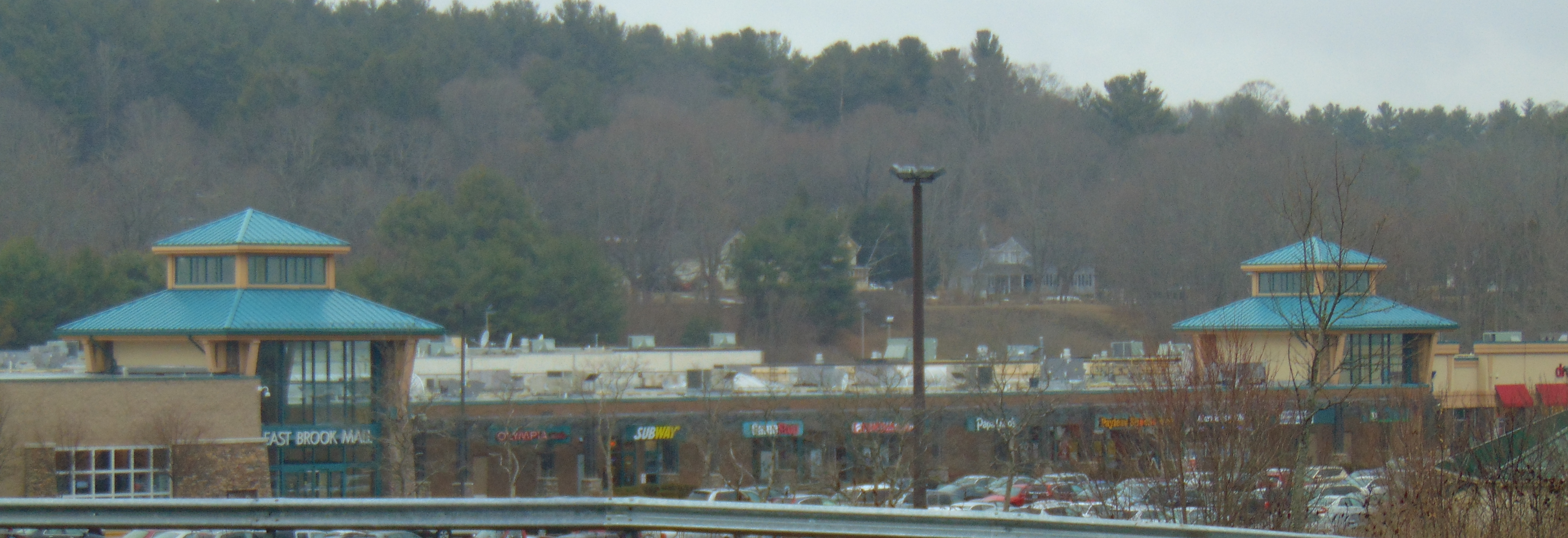
- Panorama (March 2017)
- Location: Mansfield, Connecticut, nearby Willimantic
- Coordinates: 41.7348°N 72.2004°W
- Address: 93 Storrs Road (Route 195)
- Opened: April 24, 1975; 51 years ago
- Num. of stores: 25
- Num. of anchor tenants: 3
- Floor area: 281,063 square feet (26,111.6 m^{2})
- Floors: 1
- Parking: Roughly 400 spaces
- Public transit: WRTD Willimantic-Storrs Route
- Website: www.eastbrookmallct.com

The East Brook Mall is a shopping mall located in Mansfield, Connecticut that was built to serve Willimantic and the surrounding area. The mall currently has 25 stores, including three anchor stores, Kohl's, TJ Maxx, and Michaels. When measured by available retail space, it is the smallest mall in Connecticut, as well as the third smallest mall in New England.

== History ==
The mall was opened on April 24, 1975, to the public to be the first mall opened in Northeastern Connecticut. It was opened with 3 anchor stores, Caldor, Sage-Allen, and A&P Supermarkets. In 1986, a small expansion to the back of the mall was completed, making the mall a T-shaped structure. The three anchors remained until Sage-Allen closed all its shops in 1993, including the one in the mall. Shortly after, A&P Supermarkets closed its store in 1994. Cherry & Webb opened in Sage-Allen's shop between 1993 and 1995 until JCPenney replaced the store in mid-1995. In the same year, TJ Maxx opened in the former supermarket.

=== 21st century ===
An Applebee's and Savings Bank Institute (now Berkshire Bank then Beacon Bank) both opened in external locations in the parking lot in 2001. Caldor finally closed its store in 1999 and was replaced by Ames. Ames ended up closing after its bankruptcy in 2002. A movie theater opened in the mall in 2004 and closed briefly in 2009, only to reopen under new owners. In 2005, the mall was renovated, adding glass atrium entrances, a wooden outdoor canopy, new paint, lighting, and skylights. Kohl's opened in Caldor's former space in 2006. In August 2013 JCPenney closed its store inside the mall. In the same year, a Michaels opened up next to TJ Maxx. Following years of vacancy in the former J.C. Penney space, the space was divided into three smaller units and occupied by Dressbarn, Questers Way, a children's recreation facility, and Dollar Tree. The Dressbarn location closed in 2019, after the chain's bankruptcy. Also in 2019, Questers Way closed, saying that business did not match expectations. In early 2020, Old Navy began construction on a new location at the mall. This location opened in November of the same year and took over the space of both Questers Way and Dressbarn. As part of this construction, interior access to the mall, which dates back to the Sage-Allen occupancy, was sealed. This made the Old Navy accessible only from the parking lot, which led some to predict a decrease in mall foot traffic. The East Brook Mall vacancy rate is 17%, slightly above the industry average of 11%. As of 2021, vacant spaces include a former Olympia Sports, Radio Shack, and Hallmark store. The largest vacant space is located in the west side of the mall. It opened as a Waldenbooks and was most recently occupied by a home goods store known as Art of Home and Kitchen. The TD Bank has been replaced by a Spectrum Mobile store, and what was once Children's Place is now a liquor store. Similar to Old Navy's construction process but on a smaller scale, a Sally Beauty took over half of the former Payless Shoe Source in 2021 and sealed off the interior access to the mall. As early as April 2021, mall ownership indicated that there was a prospective tenant for the other half of the space, but as of April 2022, it remains vacant.
