= Auburn Mall (Maine) =

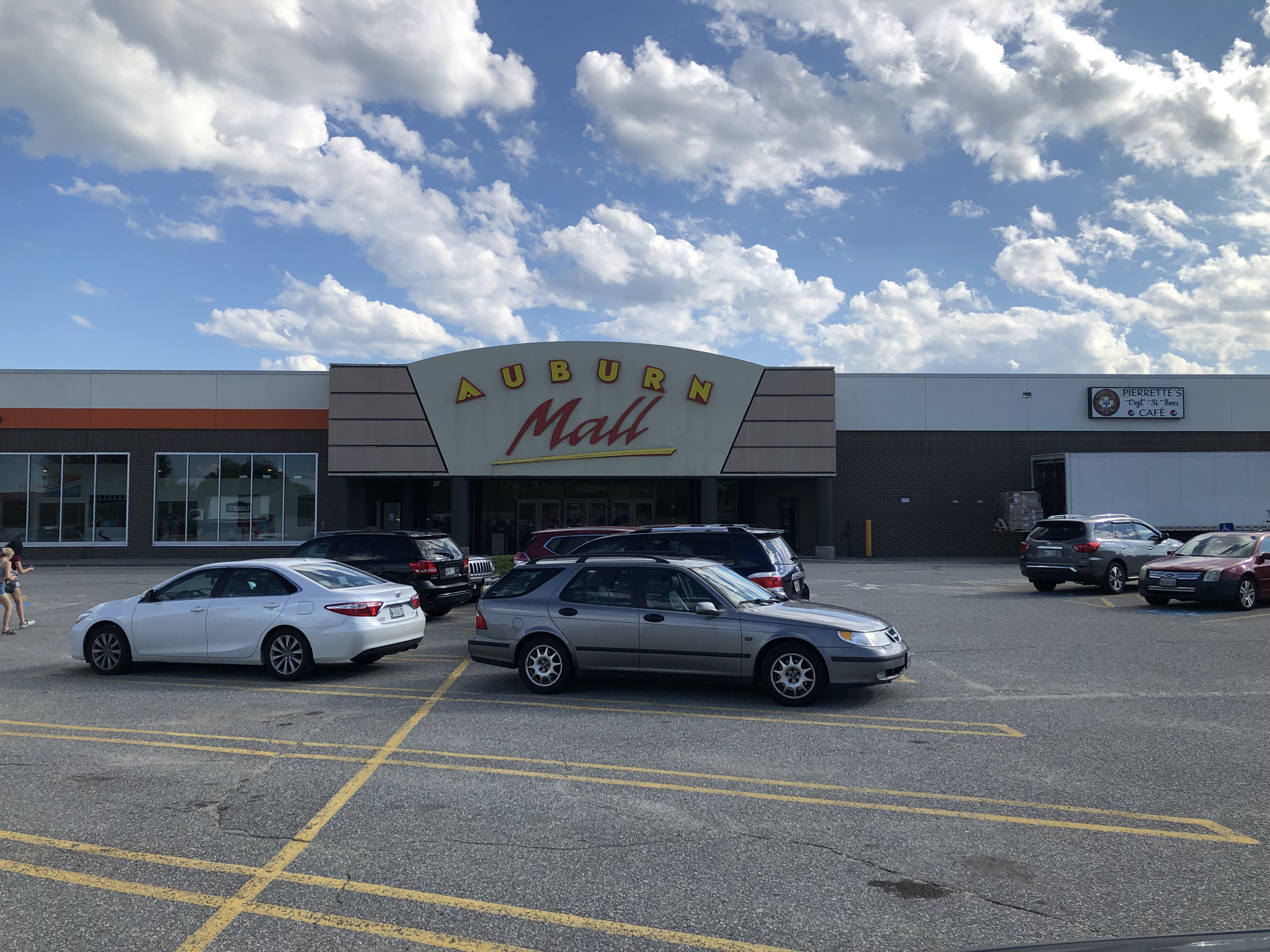
- Auburn Mall
- Location: Auburn, Maine, U.S.
- Coordinates: 44.122269°N 70.229131°W
- Address: 550 Center Street
- Opened: August 7, 1979
- Developer: Equity Property and Development
- Owner: George Schott
- Num. of stores: 50
- Num. of anchor tenants: 2
- Floor area: 300,000 square feet (28,000 m^{2})
- Floors: 1
- Website: http://www.auburnmall.com/

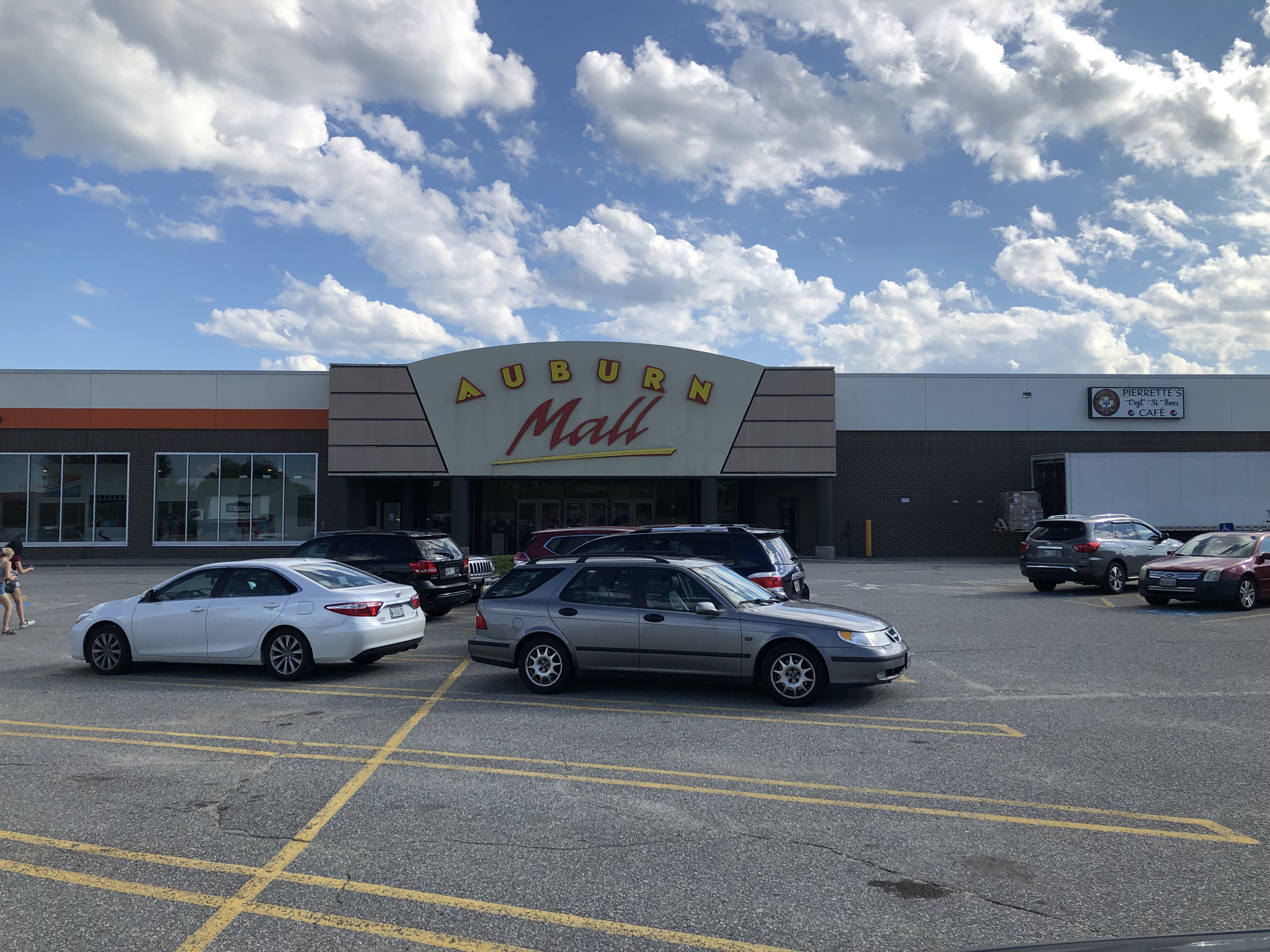
Auburn Mall entrance

Auburn Mall is a shopping mall in Auburn, Maine, United States. Opened in 1979, it features JCPenney as its anchor store. George Schott is the mall's owner.

== History ==
Auburn Mall opened in 1979. Its original anchor stores were J. C. Penney and Porteous. In 1990, Equity announced plans to expand the mall with a new wing and a Sears as a third anchor store. This would have replaced an existing Sears in Lewiston.

Porteous closed at the mall in 2002. Express and Gap closed at the mall in 2003 and 2004, respectively.

George Schott bought the mall from Equity Property and Development in 2005. Steve & Barry's opened in the former Porteous space in December 2007, but closed in September 2008. The space became offices for TD Banknorth (now TD Bank, N.A.) in 2009, which ended its lease in 2024.

Borders closed at the mall in 2011 and was converted to Books-A-Million. In 2019, a Quebecois restaurant named Pierrette's opened in the former Papa Gino's. The restaurant closed six months later in the wake of the COVID-19 pandemic.
