= Hampshire Mall =

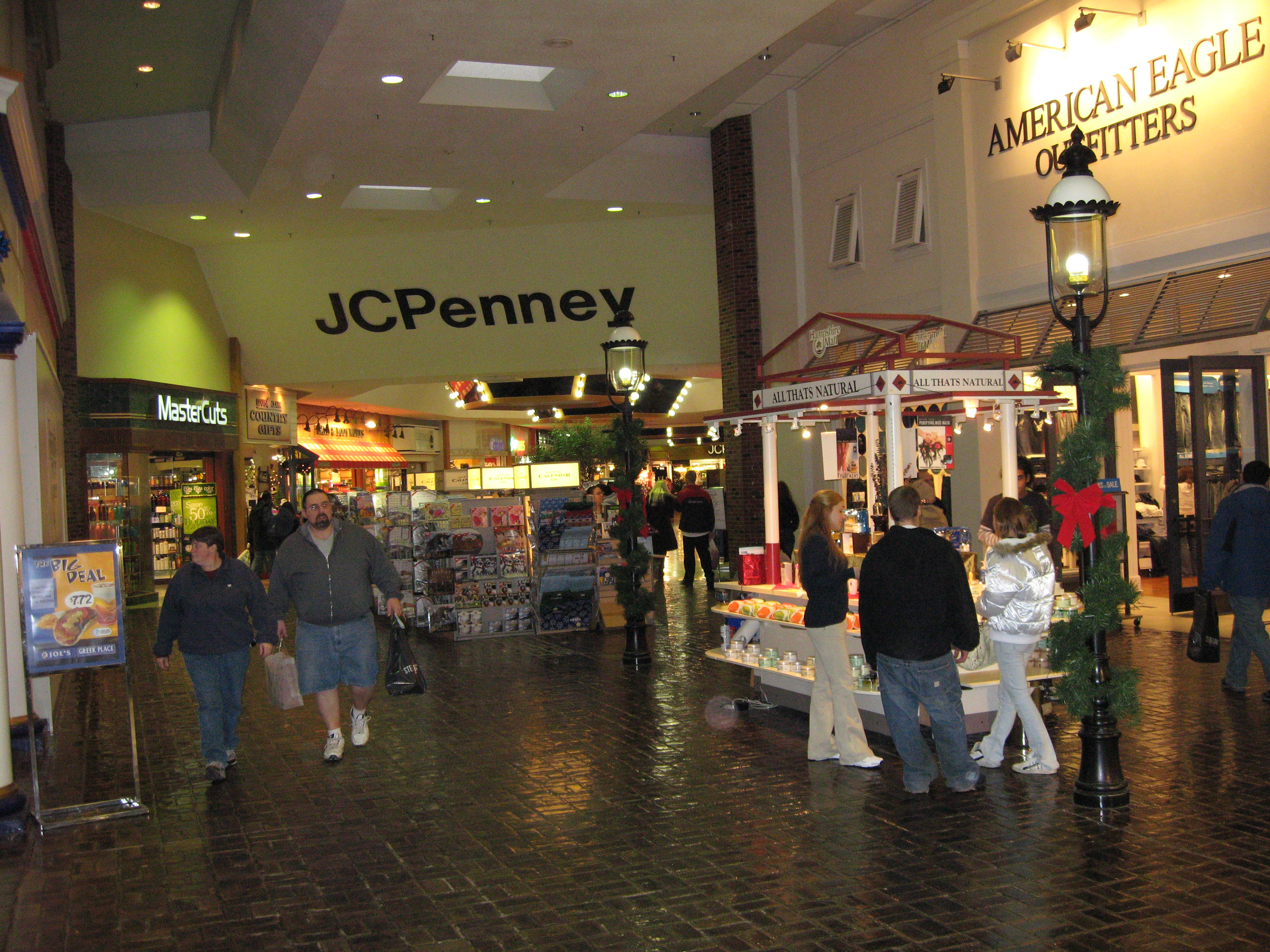
- The interior of Hampshire Mall, 2007
- Location: Hadley, Massachusetts, United States
- Coordinates: 42°21′23″N 72°32′52″W
- Address: 367 Russell Street
- Opened: 1978
- Developer: The Pyramid Companies
- Manager: Spinoso Real Estate Group
- Owner: Deutsche Bank Trust Co. Americas; Wells Fargo Commercial Mortgage Securities Inc.
- Num. of stores: approximately 30
- Num. of anchor tenants: 5
- Floor area: 435,000 square feet (40,413 m^{2})
- Floors: 1 with partial upper level
- Website: hampshiremall.com

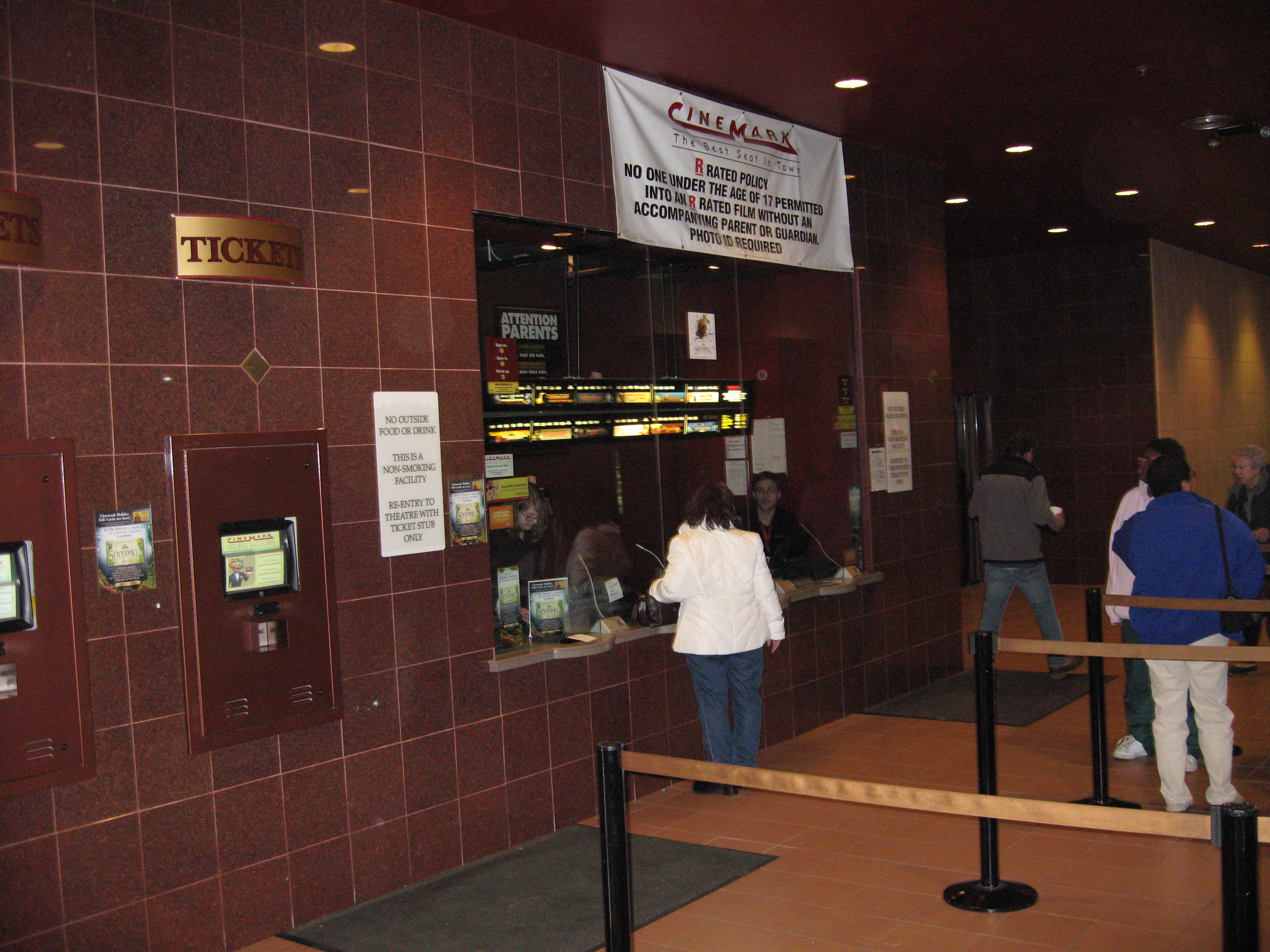
The ticket stand at the Cinemark movie theater in the Hampshire Mall

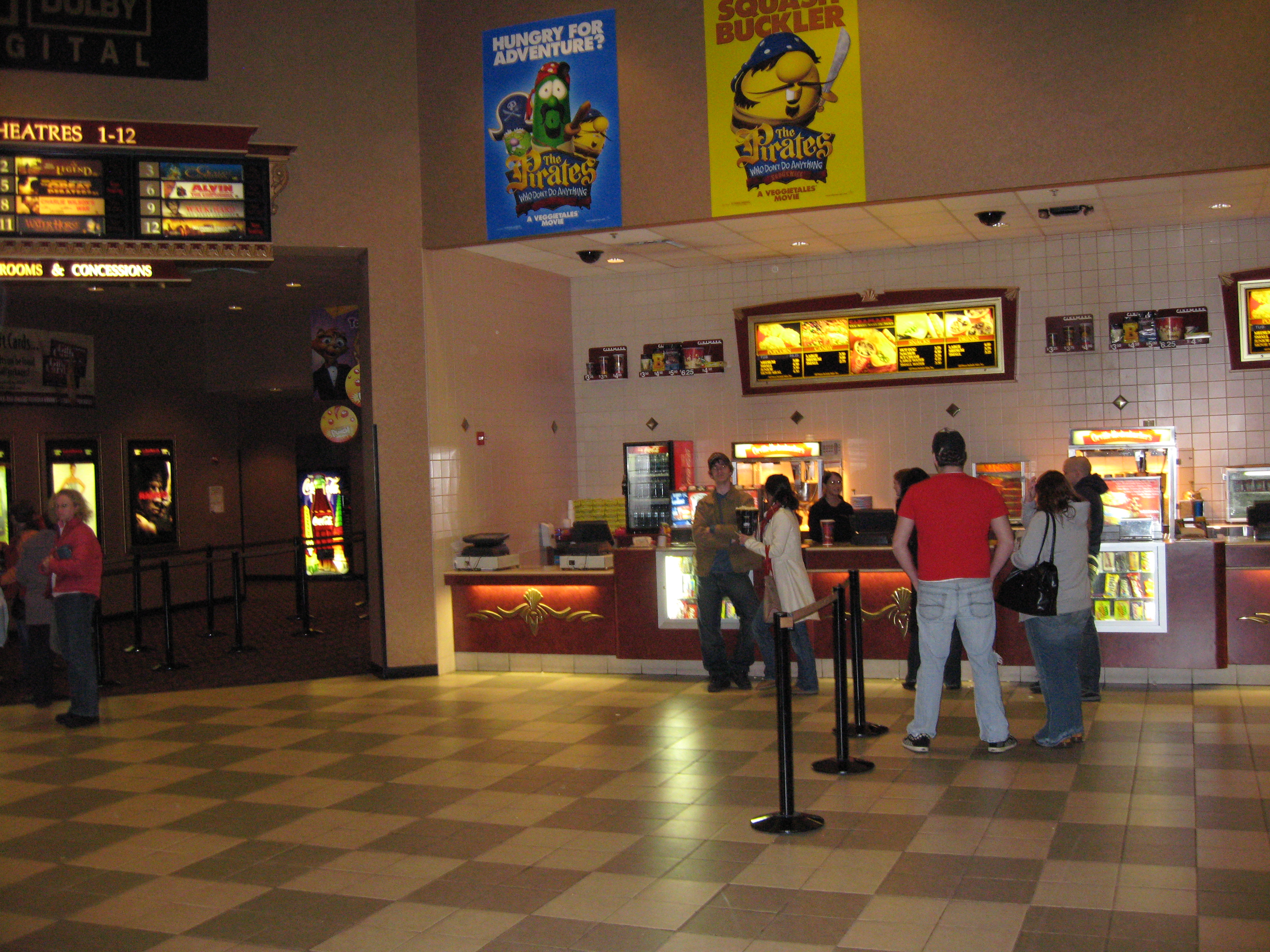
The concession stand next at the Cinemark movie theater in the Hampshire Mall. To the left is the walkway that leads to the theaters.

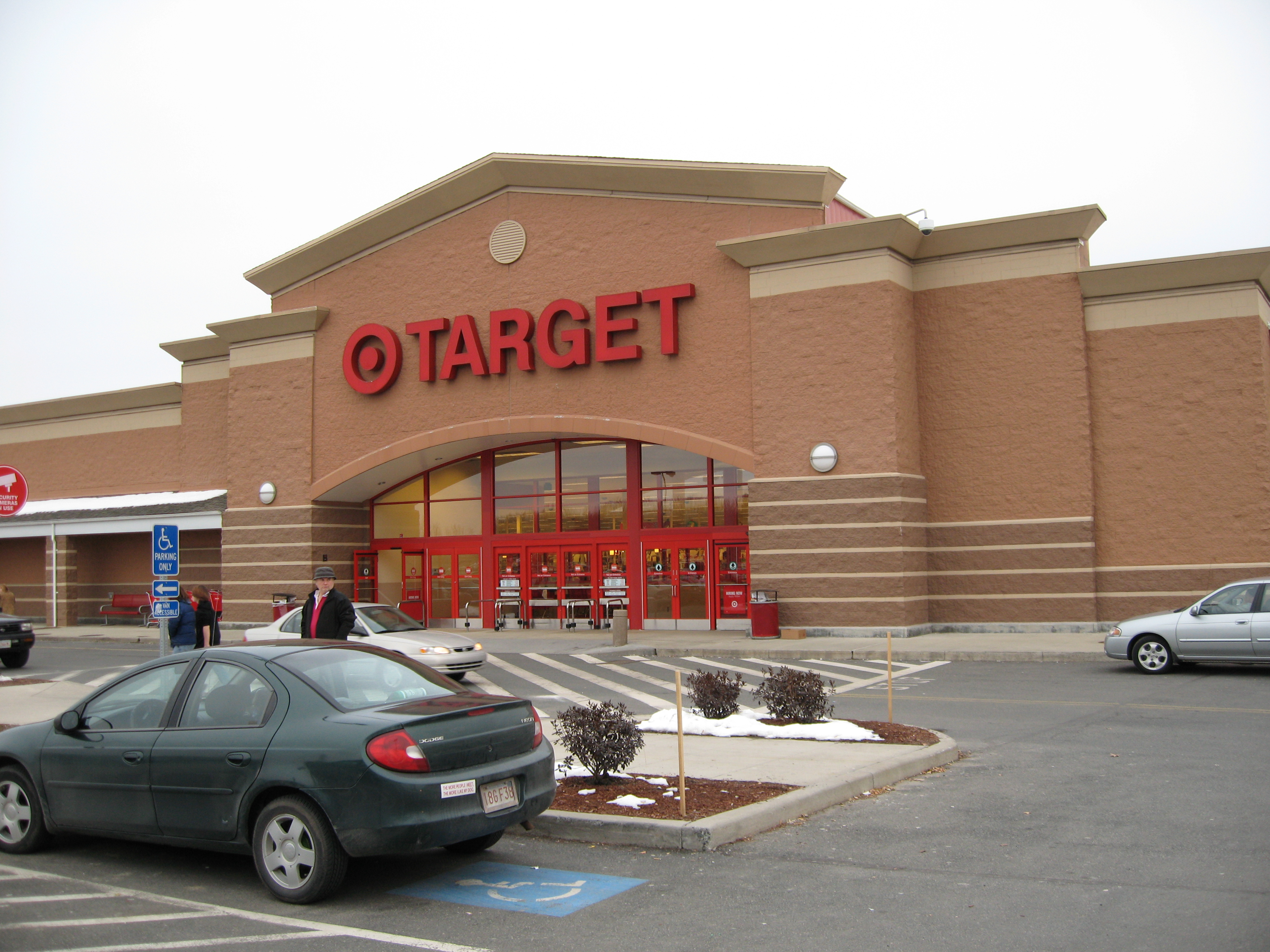
This Target store was built in 2003 and is part of Hampshire Mall

The Hampshire Mall is a primarily one-story shopping mall with a small second floor in Hadley, Massachusetts, United States, with approximately 30 stores managed by Spinoso Real Estate Group. Current anchor stores include Dick's Sporting Goods, JCPenney, PetSmart, and Target. The mall is home to Interskate 91 North, a roller skating rink on the second floor. Attached to the skating rink is LaserBlast: Ancient Adventure (a Lasertag facility that was formerly home to LaserStorm).

== History ==
When the mall opened in 1978, it was anchored by JCPenney, Steiger's and Kmart.

The Steiger's store was demolished in 1994 for Media Play. The Media Play store opened August 10, 1995. Kmart closed in 2002 because of the chain's bankruptcy. In 2003 the former Kmart space was rebuilt and extended to house a Target store. Originally the mall contained a six screen movie theater that existed from 1978 to 1999. This was then expanded to a 12-screen Cinemark movie theater in 2000.

A 45,000 sq ft (4,200 m^{2}) Dick's Sporting Goods store opened in early 2005, replacing a former Eastern Mountain Sports. Best Buy and Steve & Barry's replaced Media Play in early 2005. Steve & Barry's filed for Chapter 11 bankruptcy in 2008 and subsequently closed their Hampshire Mall store in August 2008 and it was replaced by the racetrack.

Walmart developers beginning in 2005 wished to build a new 212,000-square-foot (19,700 m^{2}) Supercenter southeast of Hampshire Mall. However, there have been various hindrances as a consequence of a bylaw designed to keep out large stores by restricting new stores to 75,000 square feet (7,000 m^{2}). After two years of negotiations, on November 20, 2007, a subdivision plan that exempted the planned Walmart Supercenter from the current bylaw restrictions was approved. Developers have eight years to get a site plan approved before the exemption expires. This would almost certainly mean the current store, attached to the east end of Mountain Farms Mall, would close.

In 2010, the state of Massachusetts considered widening Route 9 to two lanes in each direction from Middle Street to the mall area to alleviate frequent traffic jams. The proposal would add to a previous project completed in 2008 that widened Route 9 from the Calvin Coolidge Bridge in Northampton, resulting in two lanes in each direction from Northampton through Hadley to the Amherst line.

On June 20, 2024, the mall was sold at a foreclosure auction to Deutsche Bank Trust Co. Americas and Wells Fargo Commercial Mortgage Securities Inc., with Spinoso Real Estate Group managing it.
