= Forbes & Wallace =

American department store chain

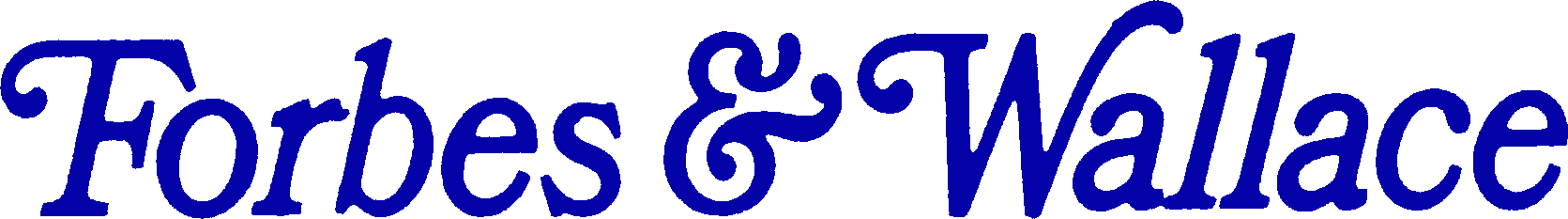
- Industry: Retail
- Founded: 1874
- Defunct: 1976
- Fate: Liquidation
- Headquarters: Springfield, Massachusetts
- Products: Clothing, footwear, bedding, furniture, jewelry, beauty products, and housewares.
- Website: None

Forbes and Wallace was an American department store chain based in Springfield, Massachusetts.

== History ==
=== Early years ===
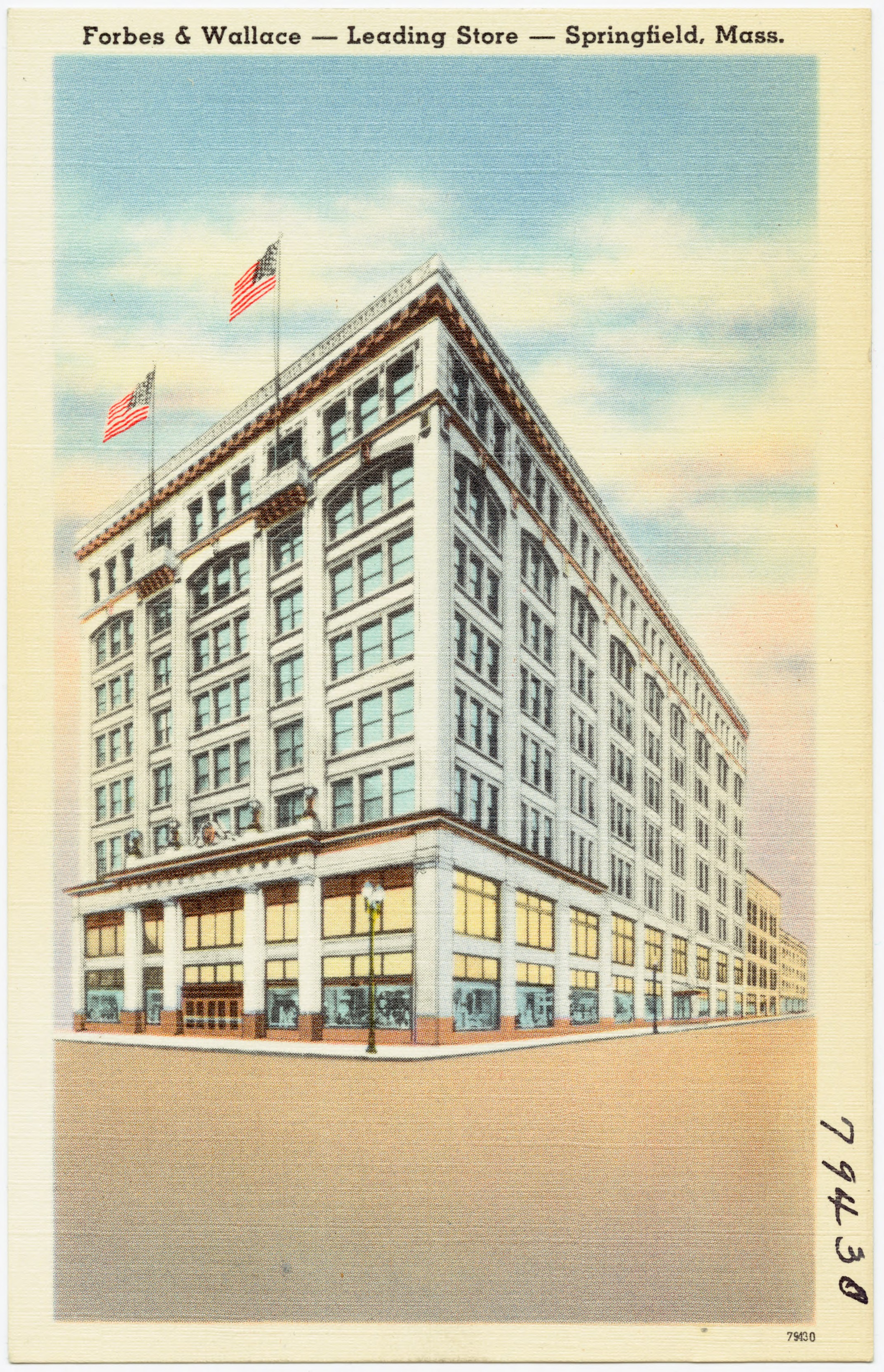
Postcard marking 75th anniversary

The Forbes and Wallace Store was constructed by partners Alexander B. Forbes and Andrew Brabner Wallace in 1873 at the corner of Main and Vernon (now Boland Way) Streets, Springfield, Massachusetts. In 1896 Forbes retired and Wallace became sole proprietor.

In 1905 the Store consisted of eight floors and had grown into a complex of six buildings, taking up the entire city block. Forbes & Wallace was considered Springfield's leading retail establishment.

=== Expansion ===
In the 1940s through the early 1970s, Forbes & Wallace also ran several other department stores in Massachusetts and New York State under their original nameplates. In Massachusetts, stores were operated in nearby Holyoke as McCauslan Waklen, and in Northampton as McCallum's. McCallum's former location is now the site of the successful indoor Thornes Marketplace, which took over the vacant space in the late 1970s. The Boston Store in downtown North Adams, MA was also part of the Forbes & Wallace chain. In New York State, Wallace's department store in downtown Schenectady, NY, with branches in Kingston and Poughkeepsie, NY was also operated by Forbes & Wallace until it closed in 1975.

Forbes & Wallace also operated 60,000-square-foot (5,600 m^{2}) store at Fairfield Mall, now the site of Home Depot, in Chicopee, MA. Forbes & Wallace and the now-defunct Two Guys were the low-rent mall's two anchor stores. The Forbes & Wallace at Fairfield Mall was closed in the mid-seventies, replaced by now-defunct Caldor. Two Guys, at the opposite end of the mall, also closed and it was replaced by now-defunct Bradlees.

Old logo

The mall, then faced with competition from the new and massive Holyoke Mall at Ingleside, went into a long period of decline. It closed in 2001 and was eventually torn down. The site is now a successful plaza featuring Home Depot, Staples, Sleepy's, a party shop and some other stores, anchored on the Bradlees side of the old mall with a Wal-Mart Super Center and ringed by Friendly's, Applebee's and a 99.

Forbes & Wallace also had branch stores at the Eastfield Mall in Springfield, MA and opened a small store at the Manchester Parkade in Manchester, CT. The Eastfield Mall location served Springfield's affluent eastern and southeastern suburban areas and was a very popular shopping destination. The Manchester, CT location was not as successful, as it was located in a small shopping center some distance from Forbes & Wallace's normal trading area, and it competed unsuccessfully with the established Hartford, CT department stores G. Fox & Co. and Sage-Allen Co.

After the demise of Worcester, MA-based Denholm & McKay Company in 1973, Forbes & Wallace briefly operated a store at the Auburn Mall in Auburn, MA in the former Denholm's location.

=== Closing ===
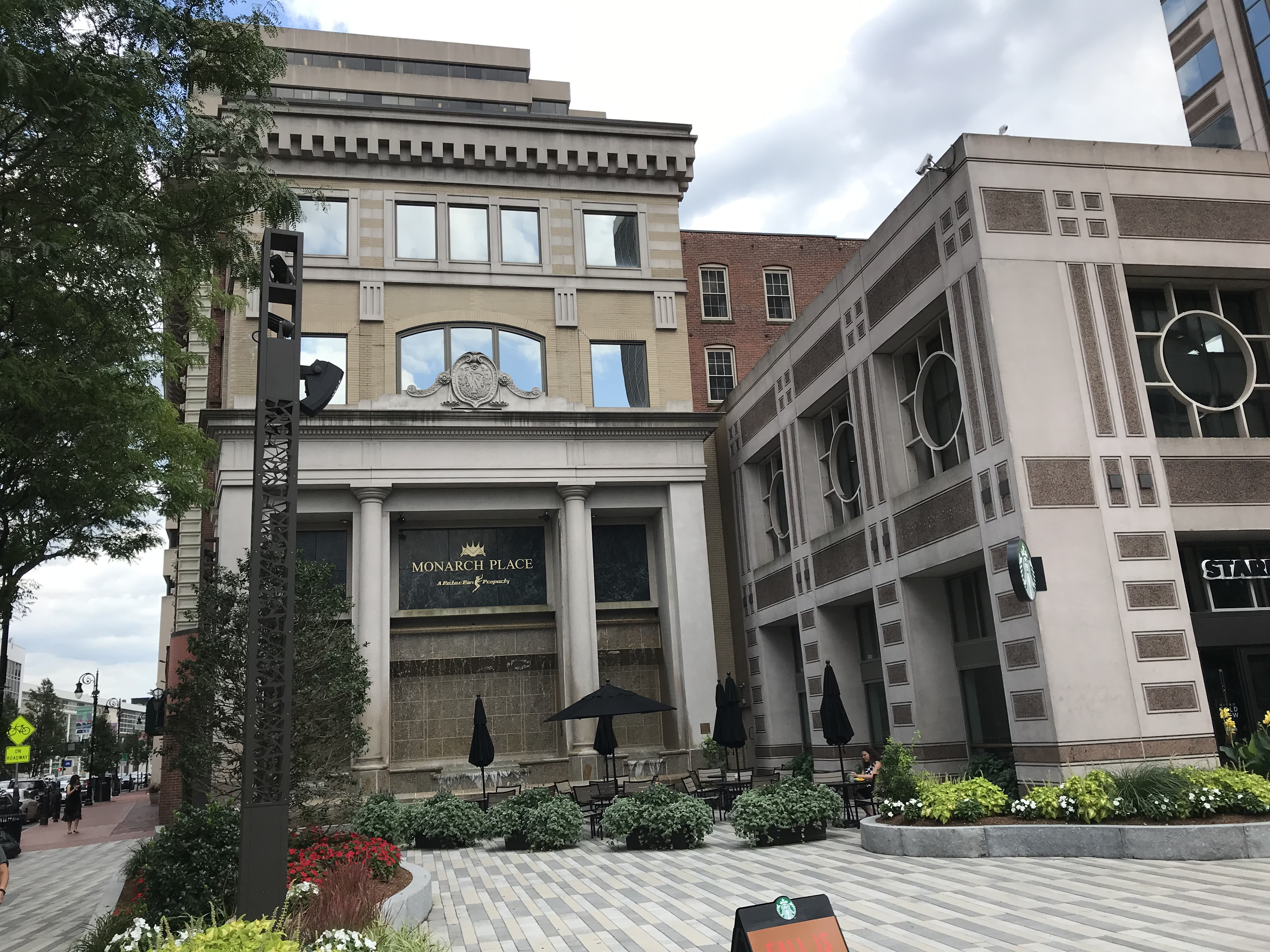
Façade of Forbes & Wallace Plaza at Monarch Place, built as a tribute to the preceding building's motifs

In 1970, it had a skywalk connecting it to the new 30 story Bay State West. Bay State West had a retail court which was also connected to Springfield's other leading private department store, Steiger's. In 1976 the store was closed and the buildings remained vacant until demolition in 1982.

In 1987, Monarch Place was constructed on the store's former site.

== See also ==
- Steiger's, another defunct department store with a flagship location in Springfield, Massachusetts
