= Porteous (store) =

Department store in Maine, US

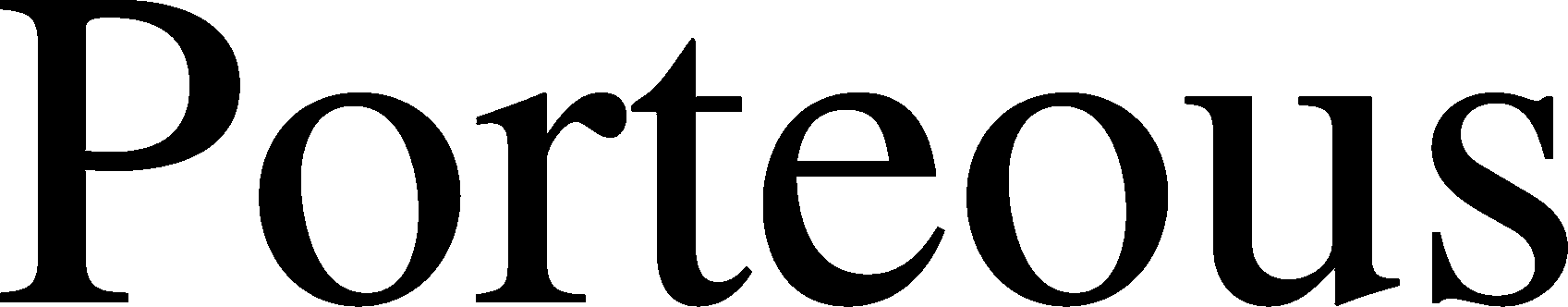
Porteous final logo

Porteous, Mitchell & Braun Co., or simply Porteous, was a mid-market department store based in Portland, Maine. Company headquarters was in the Porteous, Mitchell and Braun Company Building, a building built in 1904.

== Flagship store ==
At the time the store was opened in 1904, it was the largest department store based in Maine. The store on Congress Street in downtown Portland was the flagship location. In the 1990s, it was renovated and housed the Maine College of Art & Design. The building has been listed on the National Register of Historic Places since 1996.

== Expanded locations ==
Porteous expanded and opened branch locations in Maine, New Hampshire, and Vermont. The first Porteous branch location opened in the Newington Mall (now The Crossings at Fox Run) in August 1974. Other Porteous branches were opened in new shopping malls that opened in the late 1970s and early 1980s including the Auburn Mall in Auburn, ME (1979), Bangor Mall in Bangor, ME (1978), Burlington Square Mall (now CityPlace Burlington) in Downtown Burlington, VT and the Aroostook Centre Mall in Presque Isle, ME (1993). The former W.T. Grant store in Cooks Corner Shopping Center in Brunswick ME had been taken over by JC Penney, but was subsequently closed when the JC Penney store opened at the expanded Maine Mall in South Portland in 1983. Porteous not only opened in The Maine Mall at this time but also took over the Cooks Corner location. The downtown Portland flagship store closed not long after the Maine Mall store opened.

== Decline and shutdown ==
Owned by the Dunlaps Store chain based in Texas in its last years (starting around 1993), and operated as "PMB, Inc.--a Division of Dunlaps", the chain found itself flustered with new competition as many regional and national chains started to open units in Maine, New Hampshire and Vermont communities where Porteous previously had carved out its niche in the mid-market department store business. The chain started to shut down in the mid-1990s, closing its Newington, New Hampshire, and South Portland, Maine, stores, and was completely shuttered by 2003 when its last store in Presque Isle, Maine, closed.
