= CityPlace Burlington =

- Location: Burlington, Vermont, United States
- Coordinates: 44°28′43.7″N 73°12′47.4″W
- Opened: 1976; 50 years ago
- Closed: February 2, 2022; 4 years ago
- Owner: Devonwood Investors
- Num. of stores: 0
- Num. of anchor tenants: 0
- Floors: 2
- Website: cityplaceburlington.com

CityPlace Burlington (previously named Burlington Square Mall and Burlington Town Center) was a formerly enclosed shopping mall. Located on the Church Street Marketplace open-air mall in Burlington, Vermont, United States, it opened in 1976. The mall's anchor stores were Macy's and L.L.Bean. The western portion of the mall closed in fall 2017 for redevelopment. The eastern portion remains standing but shuttered as of 2022.

== History ==
The mall opened in 1976 as Burlington Square Mall. Its original anchor store was a Porteous department store, which later went out of business. An expansion in 1999 added the only Filene's (later Macy's) in Vermont.

In 2014, L.L.Bean announced that it would be opening a store in the mall.

In December 2013, Devonwood Investors, a development company led by managing partner Don Sinex, acquired the Town Center for $25 million. In November 2014, Sinex announced plans for a $200 million rebuilding of the mall, with new retail, office, and housing space, as well as a hotel and expanded parking facilities. By late 2016, Sinex and Devonwood had obtained private financing for the project, which had been split into two phases. In December, Sinex filed the majority of the permit applications for the $125 million first phase, which, subject to city approval, would build a 14-story tower on part of the property. Construction was to take place between July 2017 and January 2019, in time for the planned anchor tenant, the University of Vermont Medical Center, to take occupancy after the lease on its previous location expired. The western portion of the mall was demolished in 2017 for redevelopment.

On January 3, 2018, it was announced that Macy's would be closing as part of a plan to close 11 stores nationwide, which left the state of Vermont without a Macy's location. The store closed in March 2018.

On March 2, 2021, Downtown Burlington High School was unveiled in the vacant Macy's building as a temporary replacement for the original campus.

On August 2, 2021, it was announced that L.L.Bean would be relocating to Williston in summer 2022.

By February 2, 2022, all of the businesses remaining in the mall had shuttered and the building will remain entirely vacant until further development projects are completed.
