= Holyoke Mall at Ingleside =

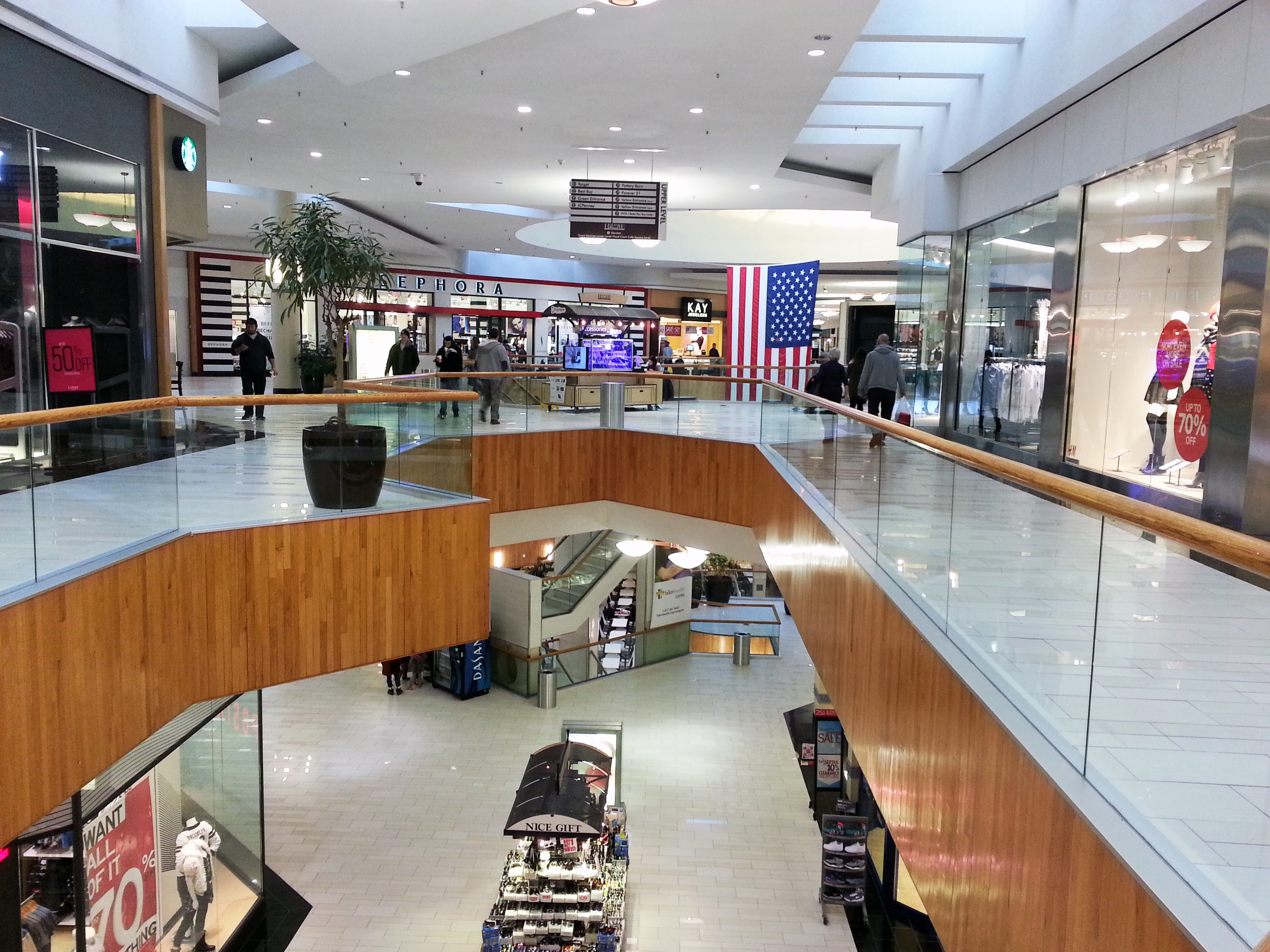
- Location: Holyoke, Massachusetts, United States
- Address: 50 Holyoke Street
- Opened: July 5, 1979
- Owner: The Pyramid Companies
- Num. of stores: 135
- Num. of anchor tenants: 9
- Floor area: 1,600,000 ft^{2} (150,000 m^{2})
- Floors: 3: Upper Level; Lower Level and food court
- Website: holyokemall.com

The Holyoke Mall at Ingleside (a.k.a. Holyoke Mall) is a super-regional shopping mall located in Holyoke, Massachusetts, in the city's Ingleside neighborhood. It is owned by The Pyramid Companies. The mall features 135 stores, a large food court, and several restaurants and is 1.6 million square feet, the third-largest in New England by retail space. The mall features the anchor stores Macy's, JCPenney, Target, Best Buy, Hobby Lobby, Mystery Bins, and Altitude Trampoline Park, run by Joseph Berthiaume and Benjamin Shirely.

The mall underwent cosmetic upgrades in 2015, which included new floors, lighting, and benches throughout the mall. Located near the interchange of I-90 and I-91, the Holyoke Mall is one of the primary shopping destinations in Western Massachusetts and attracts many out-of-state visitors.

== History ==
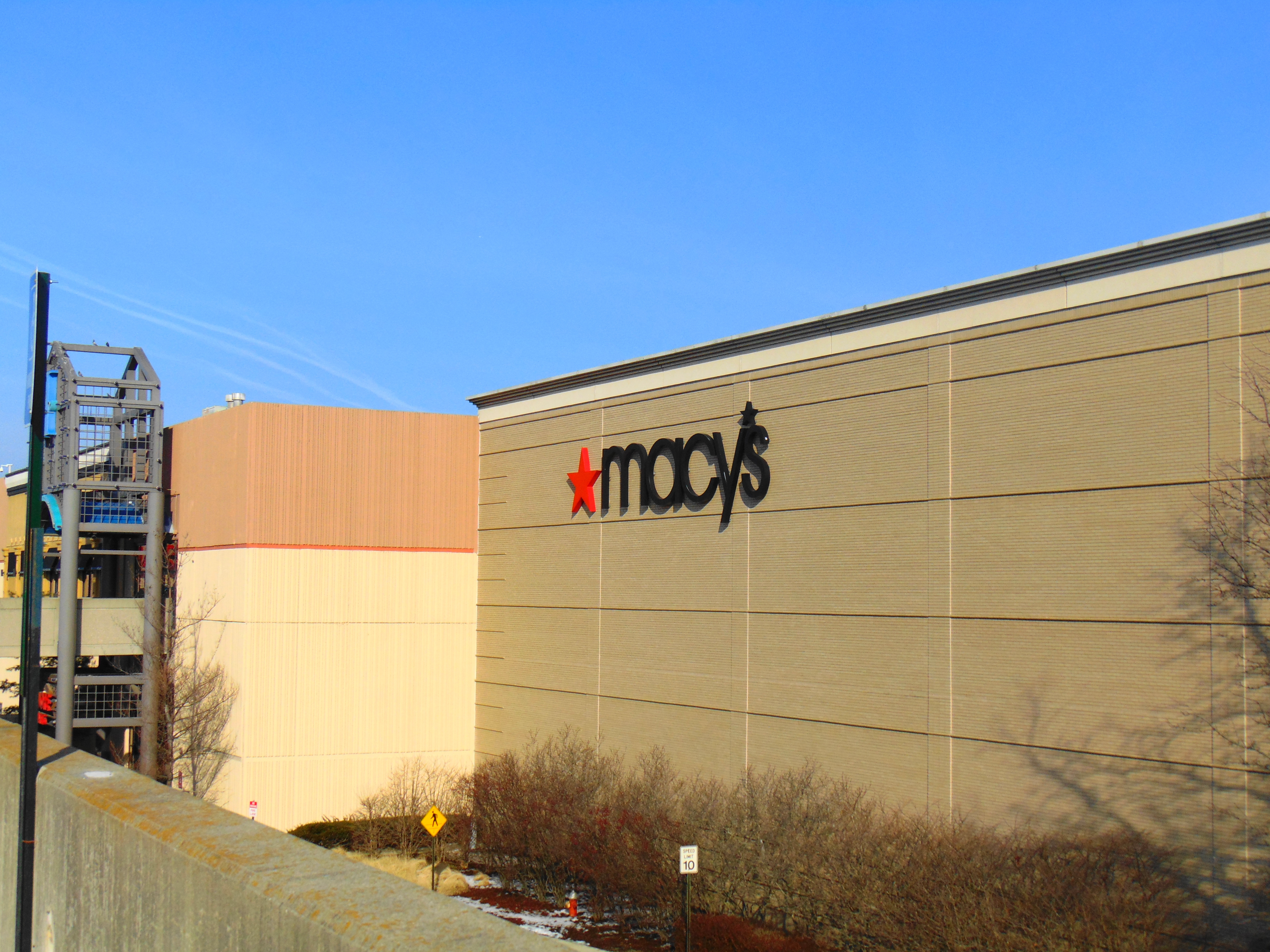
Macy's at Holyoke Mall

The mall opened in 1979 with G. Fox, JCPenney, Sears, and Steiger's as the original anchors. Plans for the mall were approved in 1973, with $1.2 million granted for construction. Before construction on the mall began, the main access road, Whiting Farms Road, was extended and referred to as the "road to nowhere" by critics before opening. The mall had also opened with 125 retail stores and an eight-screen theater located in the basement alongside the food court. In 1993, the G. Fox became Filene's.

The mall was expanded and renovated in 1995, adding a new wing, with a relocated Filene’s constructed at the end, as well as some of the first in-mall locations for Toys "R" Us and Christmas Tree Shops. At the time it was expanded, it was billed as the largest mall in New England. Around this time, Lord & Taylor announced a store to be completed by November 1993. Pyramid in 1998 proposed a 1,400,000-square-foot (130,000 m^{2}) expansion that would have added a 20-screen cinema complex, but this attempt was blocked by the city. Lord & Taylor closed in 2005. On June 25, 1999, Best Buy would officially open. Additionally, Target opened at the mall a month later on July 25 of the same year, becoming one of the company's first stores in Massachusetts. In September 2006, Filene's became Macy's. In December 2019, it was reported a Cinemark 10 screen theater complex was in the early stages of development. It has since been put on hold.

On September 28, 2024, Mystery Bins opened a store on the lower level of the mall in one of the anchor spaces. Mystery Bins sells overstock and returned items from major retailers in large bins.

In 2025, Dick's Sporting Goods announced that their "House of Sport" concept store will be built in the former Sears.
