= Aroostook Centre Mall =

- Location: Presque Isle, Maine
- Coordinates: 46°42′00″N 68°00′22″W
- Opened: November 1, 1993
- Developer: Widewaters Group
- Owner: Dana Cassidy
- Num. of stores: 30+
- Num. of anchor tenants: 5 (2 open, 3 vacant)
- Floor area: 525,000 square feet (48,800 m^{2})
- Floors: 1
- Website: aroostookcentre.com

Aroostook Centre Mall is a shopping mall in Presque Isle, Maine, United States. It opened on November 1, 1993. Shortly after its opening, the U.S. government announced the closing of nearby Loring Air Force Base, the region's largest employer.

The mall contains J. C. Penney and Harbor Freight Tools as anchor stores. Kmart closed in August 2016. Former anchors Sears and Staples closed in early 2015. VIP Parts, Tires and Service moved into the Sears Automotive Center. Staples had opened in 2004, taking part of an anchor space previously occupied by Porteous. That Porteous store, closed in 2003, was the last in the chain.

The 525,000-square-foot (48,800 m^{2}) building is the third largest enclosed shopping mall in Maine. In June 2001, it was sold for $10 million (less than half of the appraised value) to brothers Eddie & Ralph Sitt of New York City.

In August 2009, the mall updated its energy technology by moving towards more efficient heating, cooling, and ventilation systems.

Sears announced the closing of its Presque Isle store in late 2014. Deb Shops closed in 2014, part of a nationwide liquidation. On January 19, 2015, the Maine Jump, a family entertainment center for children 12 and younger, closed, citing high rent and costs of doing business in the area. In early February 2015 the mall added a coin and hobby supply shop, Central Lakes Coin and Currency. As of 2017, the existing space where Sears used to be was being renovated for the retail store Harbor Freight Tools. In early November 2025, Ruby Tuesday closed. In January 2026, the mall lost its last national inline tenant, Bath & Body Works.

In October 2017, the mall was scheduled to be auctioned off. With no bidder found, Wells Fargo took over the mall for $4 million.
