= Steiger's =

Former American department store

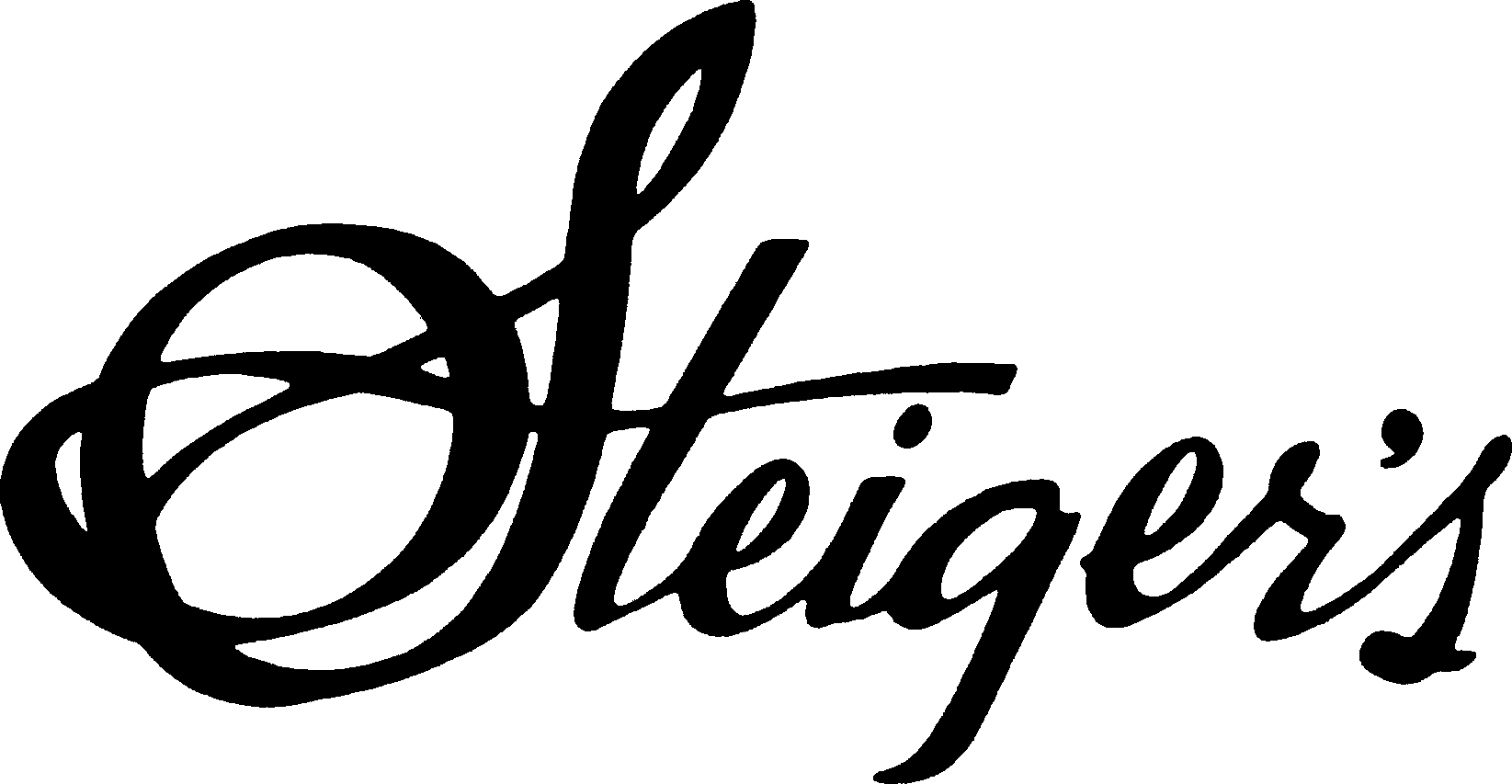

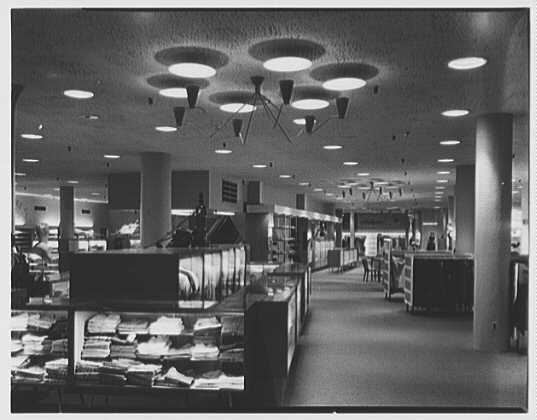
- Menswear and furniture departments in the Springfield flagship store, 1953
- Industry: Retail
- Founded: 1896; 130 years ago (Note: Albert Steiger Company; Holyoke, Massachusetts)
- Defunct: 1995; 31 years ago
- Fate: Acquired by May Department Stores
- Successor: Macy's
- Products: Clothing, footwear, bedding, furniture, jewelry, beauty products, and housewares.
- Parent: May Department Stores (1994-1995)

Steiger's was an American department store company of New England in the 19th and 20th centuries. Founded in Holyoke, Massachusetts in 1896, its flagship store for much of the company's history was in Springfield, Massachusetts. At the time of its purchase by May Department Stores, Steiger's was described as the last family-owned chain of department stores in New England.

== History ==
Albert Steiger (1860–1938) was born in Ravensburg, Germany, on May 12, 1860, the eldest child of Jacob and Mary (née Felerabend) Steiger. His grandfather, John Ulrich Steiger, was a Swiss-born manufacturer of muslin who emigrated to the United States following the death of his wife and set up a bedspread manufacturing business in Huntington. In 1869 Albert Steiger and his parents would move to the United States as well, joining the family firm. Two years later however, John Steiger died, and by 1873 Albert Steiger's father and uncle had as well. At the age of 13 Steiger became the breadwinner in his family, looking after a widowed mother and two younger sisters. For the better part of 20 years he supported himself and his family by purchasing dry goods from a Mr. Darwin Gillett of Westfield, reselling and delivering these goods to the Hilltowns at a profit.

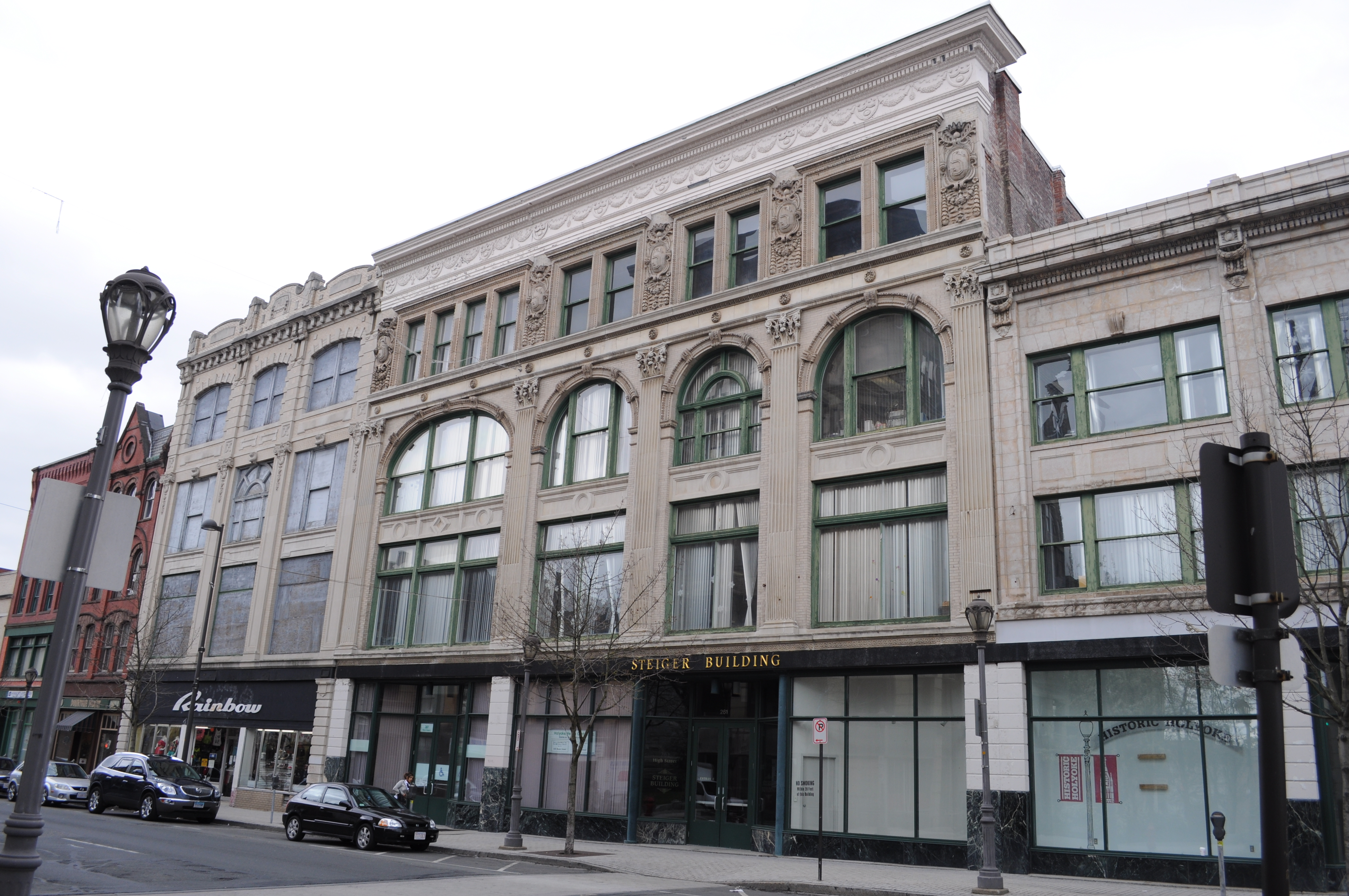
The Steiger Building, erected in 1899, was the first building specifically built as a department store in Holyoke.

In 1894, at the age of 34, Steiger left Massachusetts and relocated to Port Chester, New York, north of New York City, where he opened his first dry goods store for a short time. In 1896, he would return to Western Massachusetts and found his namesake department store in Holyoke, Massachusetts under the name The Albert Steiger Company, which quickly became a mainstay in that city. The Holyoke store, built in 1899, was a four-story beaux arts building designed by George P. B. Alderman, on High Street across from City Hall. The former department store building is still in use as offices today.

Classic logo

Around the turn of the 20th century, Albert Steiger opened a series of stores in Fall River, Massachusetts, New Bedford, Massachusetts, and Springfield, Massachusetts. A store in Hartford, Connecticut followed in 1918. By his death in 1938, Steiger's branches in western New York and New England brought in an estimated gross revenue of $25 million, equivalent to more than $450 million in 2020.

== Mid to late 20th century ==
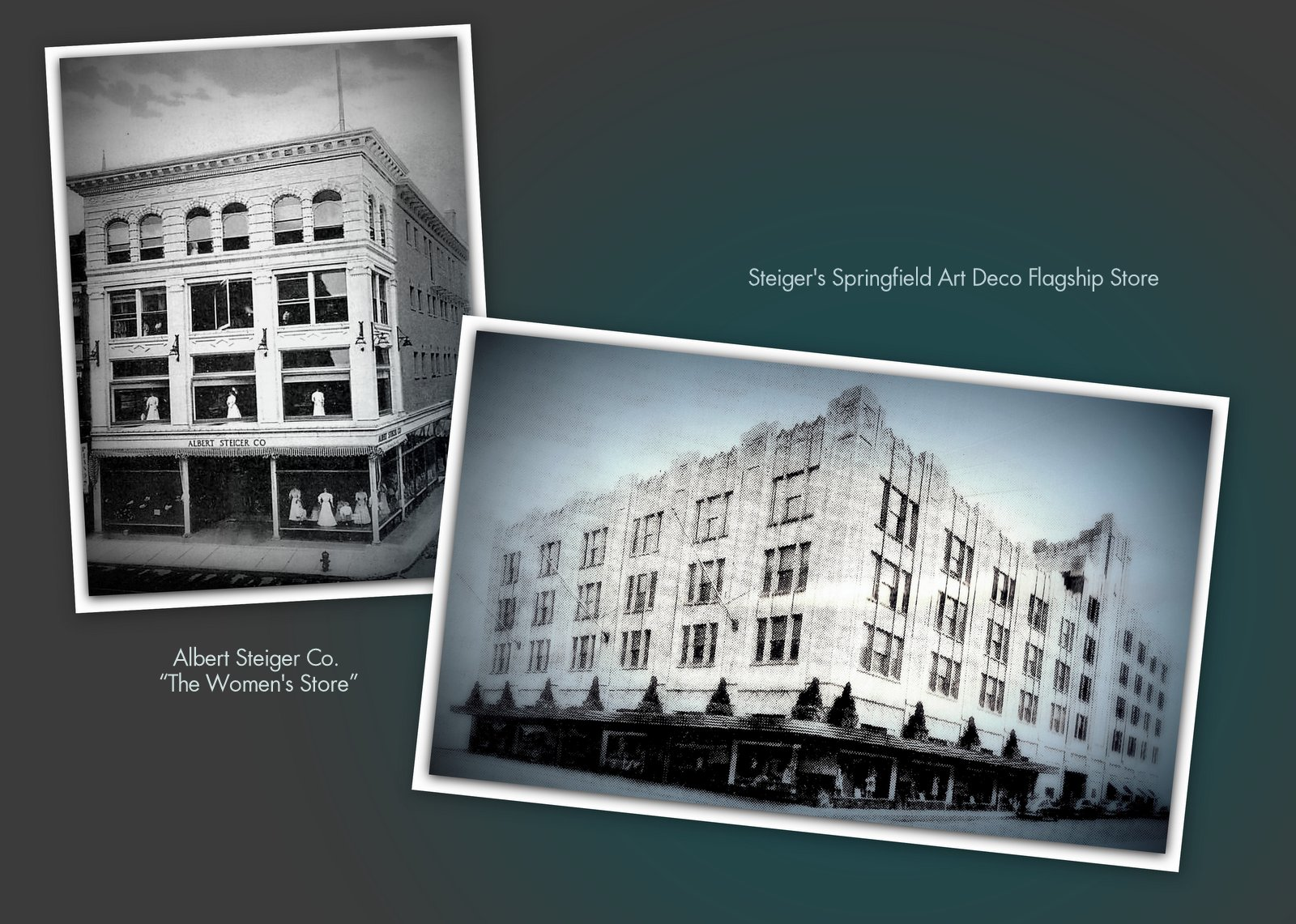
Two of Steiger's Department Stores, Springfield, Mass. (1906 / 1960)

The five-story art deco downtown Springfield store was the chain's flagship during the mid-to-late 20th century. In contrast to Springfield's other main store, traditional full-service department store Forbes & Wallace, Steiger's concentrated more on being a high-end clothing store. Several generations of the Steiger family carried on this business. Albert Steiger's grandson, Albert E. Steiger Jr., was president of the company from 1959 to 1992, his younger brother Ralph A. Steiger was appointed treasurer and vice president since 1947 and CEO from 1992 to 1995.

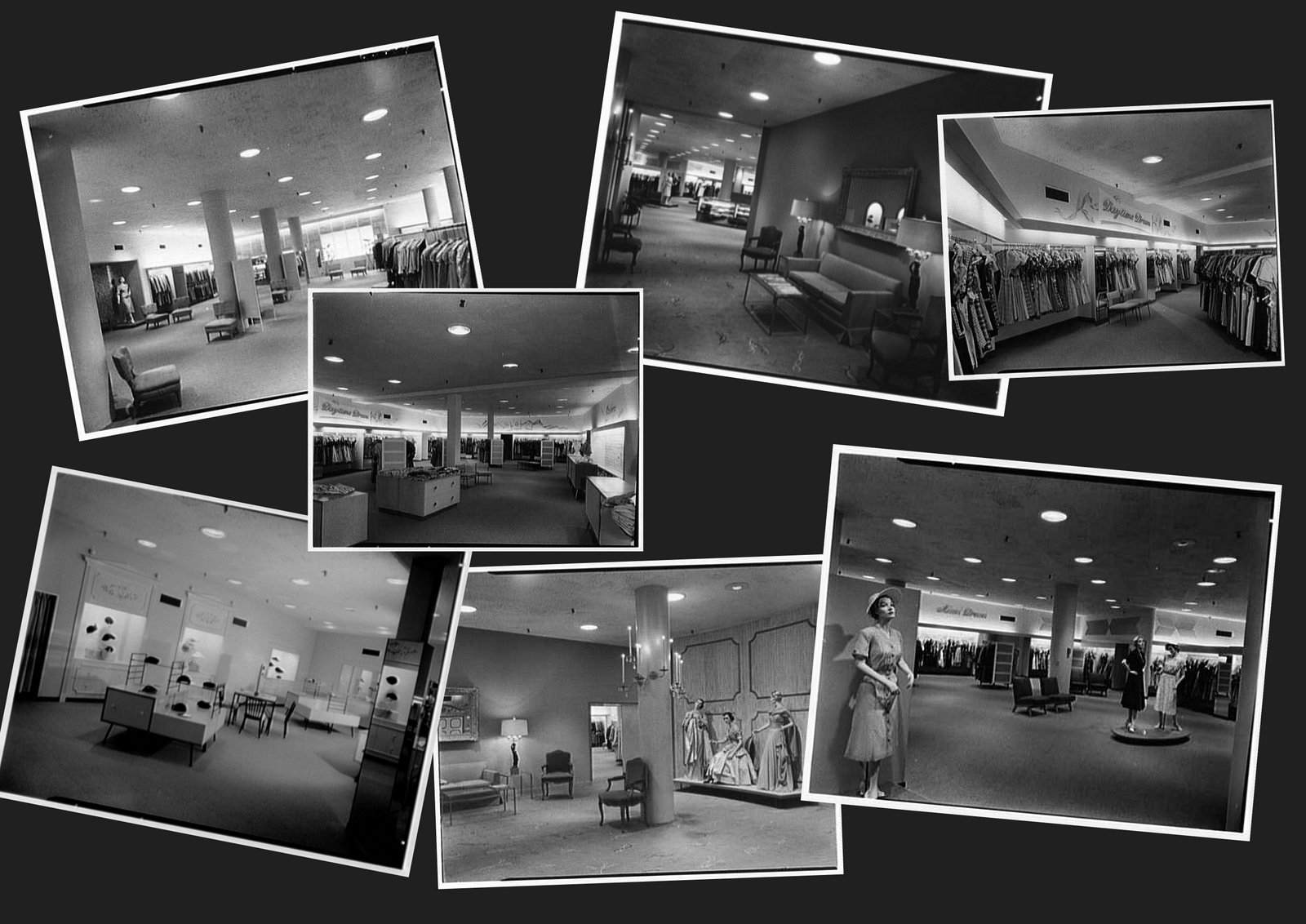
Elegant and spacious: Steiger's flagship store, Springfield, Mass. 1953.

Over time, the freestanding downtown stores were closed and replaced with rented outlets in malls. The Hartford store was sold in 1962, leaving just the Springfield and Holyoke locations as traditional downtown department stores. Mall outlets were opened in the Longmeadow Shops (1961), Springfield Plaza (1964), Friendly Shops at Westfield, Massachusetts (1965), Eastfield Mall (1967), Enfield Square Mall (1972), Hampshire Mall in Hadley, Massachusetts (1978), Holyoke Mall at Ingleside (1979), and Buckland Hills Mall in Manchester, Connecticut (1990).

== Final phase ==
Steiger's was taken over by The May Department Stores Company in 1994 and the company and brand ceased to exist. The Eastfield Mall store, for instance, was replaced by a Filene's, then in 2006 by a Macy's before being closed in 2016. The downtown Springfield store closed in 1995 and the building was torn down soon after. A park now occupies the site.

== Excursus ==
Direct Swiss/German relatives of Albert Steiger (1860–1938):

Ulrich Steiger, brother of Albert Steiger's father Jacob – co-founder of Steiger & Deschler, a major textile company in Ulm, Krumbach, and Ravensburg, in Germany

Walther Steiger, cousin of Albert – constructor and founder of the Steiger automobile company in Burgrieden near Ulm, Germany.

== See also ==
- Forbes & Wallace, another defunct department store with a flagship location in Springfield, Massachusetts
- List of department stores converted to Macy's
