= Bangor Mall =

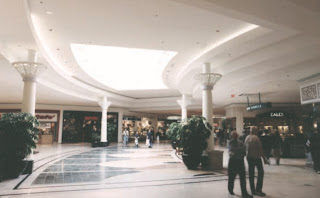
- Bangor Mall, 1999
- Location: Bangor, Maine, U.S.
- Coordinates: 44°49′49″N 68°44′56″W
- Opened: October 1978
- Closed: November 2, 2026 (interior)
- Developer: The Kravco Co.
- Manager: Mason Asset Management
- Owner: Namdar Realty Group
- Num. of stores: 16
- Num. of anchor tenants: 4 (3 open, 1 vacant)
- Floor area: 653,000 square feet (60,700 m^{2})
- Floors: 1

Bangor Mall was a 60-acre (24 ha) shopping mall in Bangor, Maine, United States.

Located off the Stillwater Avenue exit on Interstate 95, it serves as a shopping center for the surrounding Bangor area. Current stores include JCPenney and Dick's Sporting Goods. Previous anchors include Sears, which closed in 2018; Macy's (originally Filene's, which opened in 1998), which closed in 2017 and became Furniture, Mattress and More in 2018; and Porteous, which closed in 2003 and became Dick's Sporting Goods in 2004. The former Sears space now stands condemned for building-code violations after a convicted fraudster attempted to convert it into a used car dealership.

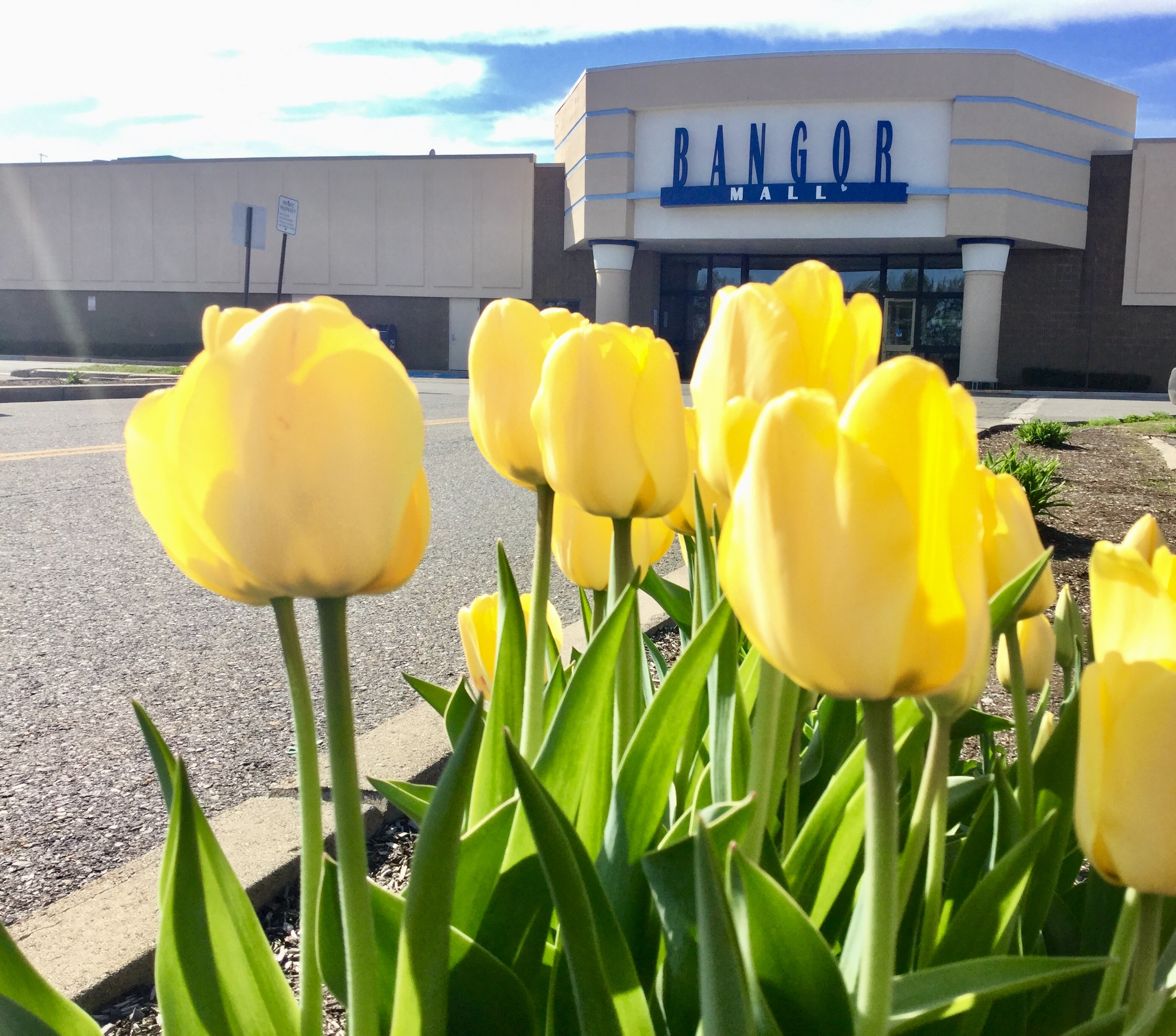
Bangor Mall entrance in spring 2018; this entrance, as well as the wing to the mall, has been condemned and inaccessible to the public.

Built in 1977 on a former dairy farm and opened in October 1978, the mall sits on Stillwater Avenue north of Bangor's central business district. It can be reached from nearby Interstate 95 via exits 186 and 187.

In 1998, Filene's opened its store in the mall during the 1996-1998 renovation.

Bangor Mall is managed by Namdar Realty Group, which acquired the mall for $12.6 million in 2019 after Simon Property Group defaulted on an $80 million loan.

In October 2024, the City of Bangor filed a lawsuit against Namdar Realty Group over the mall's deteriorating conditions, citing concerns over the parking lot, sign damage, and failure to fix the roof causing leaks. One tenant, Ten Bucks Theatre, located in the former PacSun, announced it would be leaving the mall once their lease ends in March 2025, citing ceiling leaks destroying props and costumes, as well as a lack of consistent air conditioning as the reason. As of 2026, the space remains abandoned.

In April 2026, Namdar declared their intention to sell the mall. The prospective owners, Bangor Marketplace and Residences LLC, have announced plans to renovate shopping spaces and transform dilapidated areas into condominiums and assisted living facilities. In October 2026, it was announced that the lead investor for the redevelopment project had pulled out. The following month, the building was condemned, except for Dick's Sporting Goods and JCPenney, which have dedicated entrances.

The mall was closed on November 2, 2026.
