= Auburn Mall (Massachusetts) =

Coordinates: 42.2023°N 71.8354°W

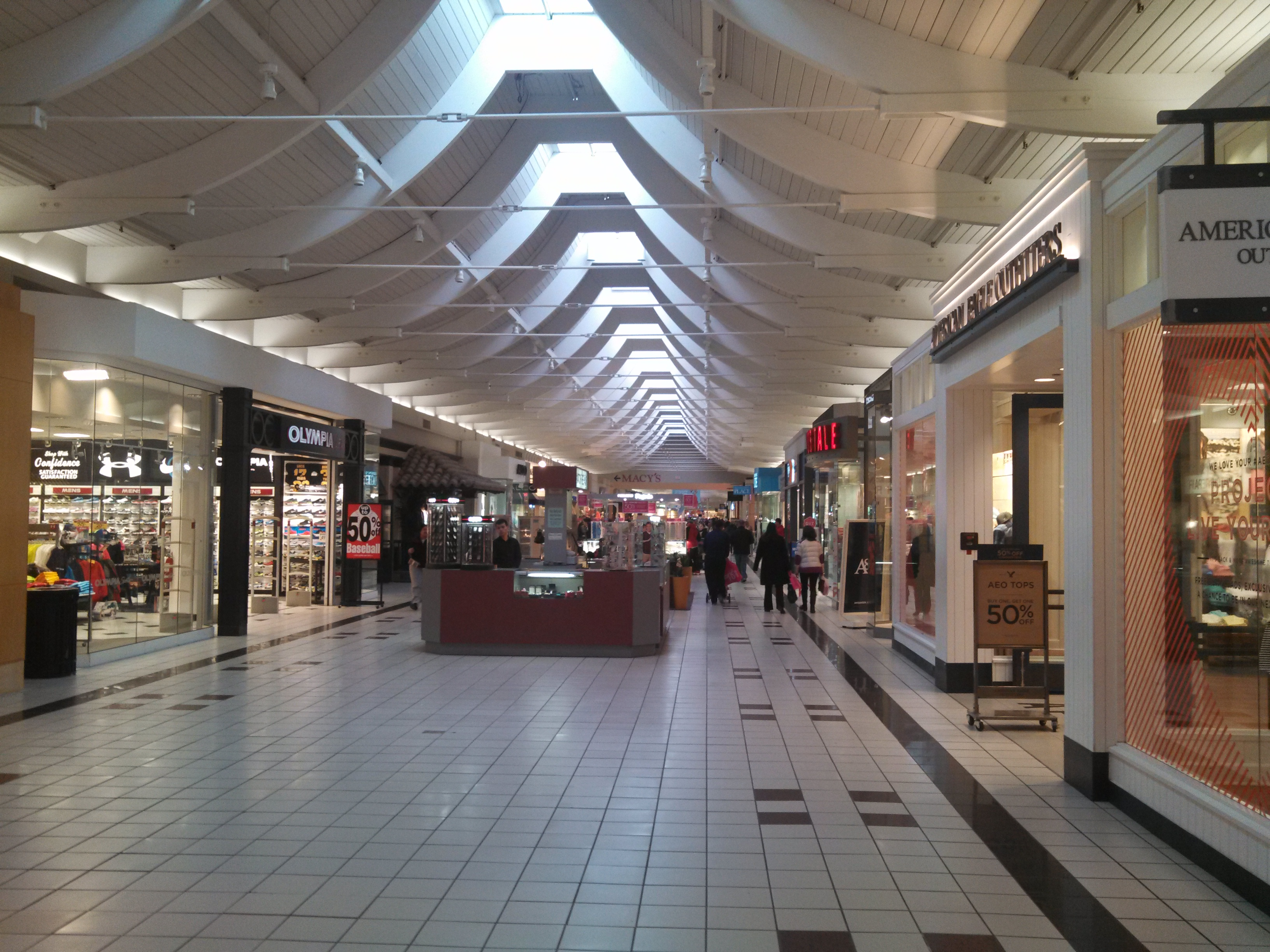
- Inside the Auburn Mall
- Location: 385 Southbridge St., Auburn, Massachusetts, United States
- Opened: 1971
- Developer: JMB Realty
- Manager: Simon Property Group
- Owner: Simon Property Group
- Num. of stores: 59
- Num. of anchor tenants: 3 (2 open, 1 vacant)
- Floor area: 583,739 square feet (54,231.1 m^{2})
- Floors: 1 (2 in anchors)
- Website: simon.com/mall/auburn-mall

The Auburn Mall, managed by Simon Property Group its an enclosed shopping mall located on Route 12 in Auburn, Massachusetts, United States, near the intersection of the Massachusetts Turnpike (Interstate 90) and I-290/I-395.

The mall is anchored by Macy's, a Reliant Medical Group center, and has a vacant anchor spot last occupied by Sears.

== History ==
The mall was originally built in 1971 but the new Denholm's store opened in March 23 1970 but it closed down for good in January 1974 when the company went bankrupt and featured Sears as anchors. in 1974 Denholm's was converted to Forbes & Wallace, and later to The Outlet, a Providence, Rhode Island–based department store chain. The Outlet opened at the mall in 1976 after Forbes and Wallace went bankrupt so the Outlet store took over the building but it closed in 1982 and was replaced with Caldor.

The mall underwent a significant renovation in 1997 which added Filene's as a third anchor. and the renovations included 2 multi level Parking Garages and interior modernization like Updated flooring lighting and ceilings and redesigned entrances for better flow and Exterior updates and Updated restrooms and seating areas and better signage and a new Food Court and Caldor closed in 1999 and was converted to a Filene's home store. In 2006, the two Filene's stores in the mall were both converted to Macy's. But the Macy's Home Store closed down in 2015.

== Decline and store closures ==
In October 2015, the mall unveiled plans to add a 10-screen cinema and restaurant in the space occupied by Macy's Home Store which closed on December 1, 2015. By April 2016, those plans were approved. However, in November 2016, the mall abandoned previous plans and proposed a new medical center for the Macy's Home Store space. On June 16, 2017, the mall announced that Reliant Medical Group signed a 20-year lease and opened in the space formerly occupied by Macy's Home Store on February 18, 2019.

On November 7, 2019, it was announced that Sears would be closing on February 16, 2020, as part of a plan to close 96 stores nationwide which left Macy's as the only anchor left. Since 2020, the mall has been declining for years.
