= Augusta, Maine =

Capital city of Maine, United States

Augusta
- State capital city
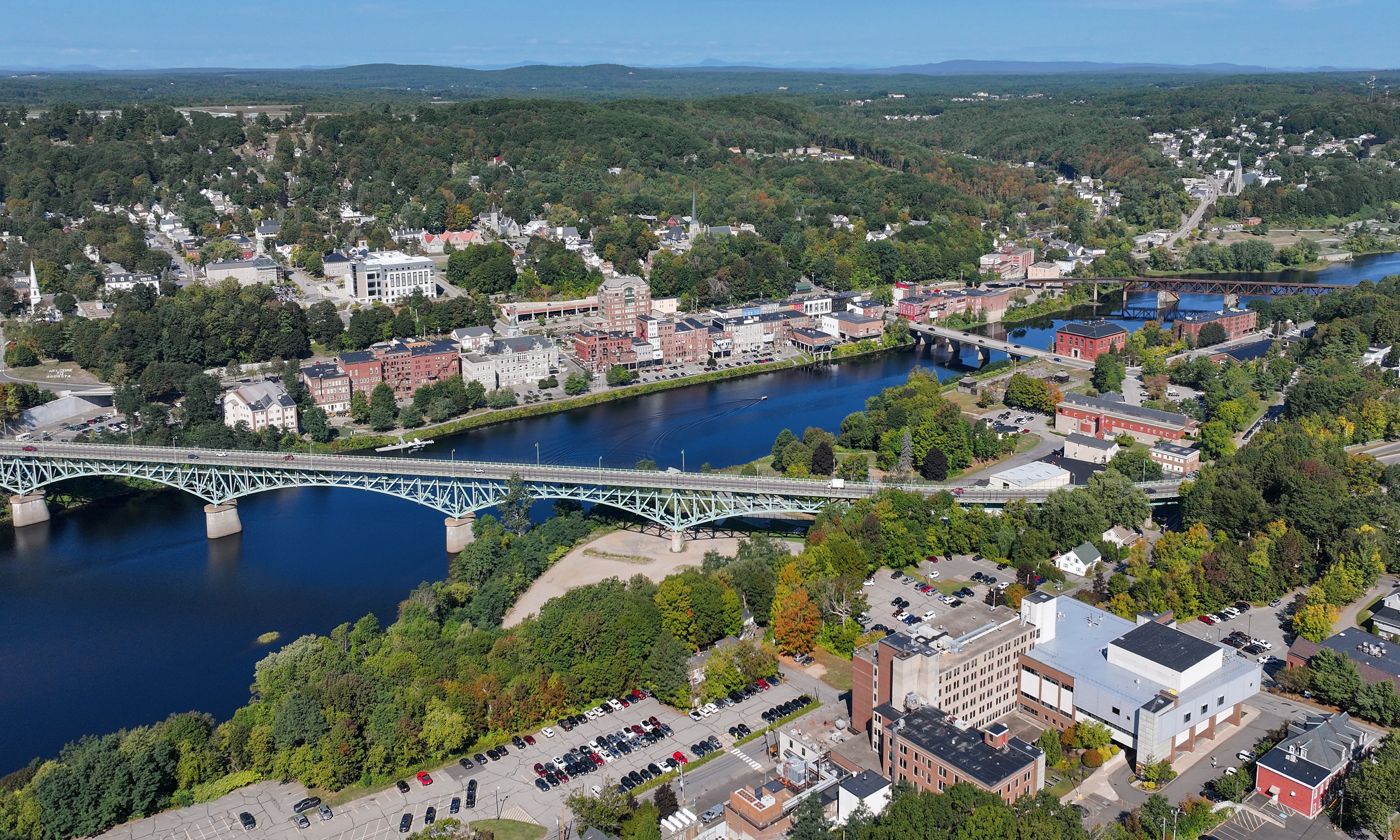
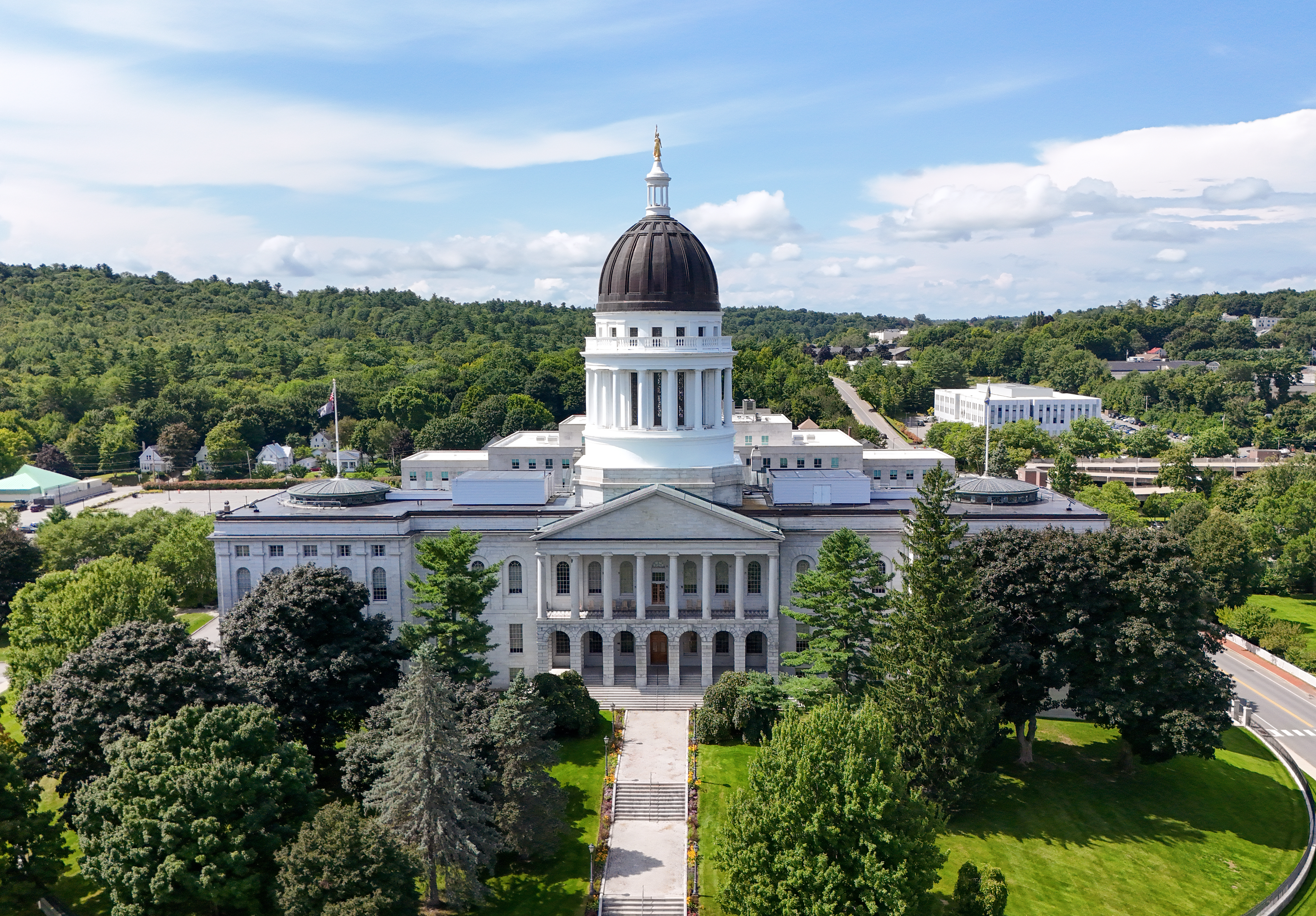
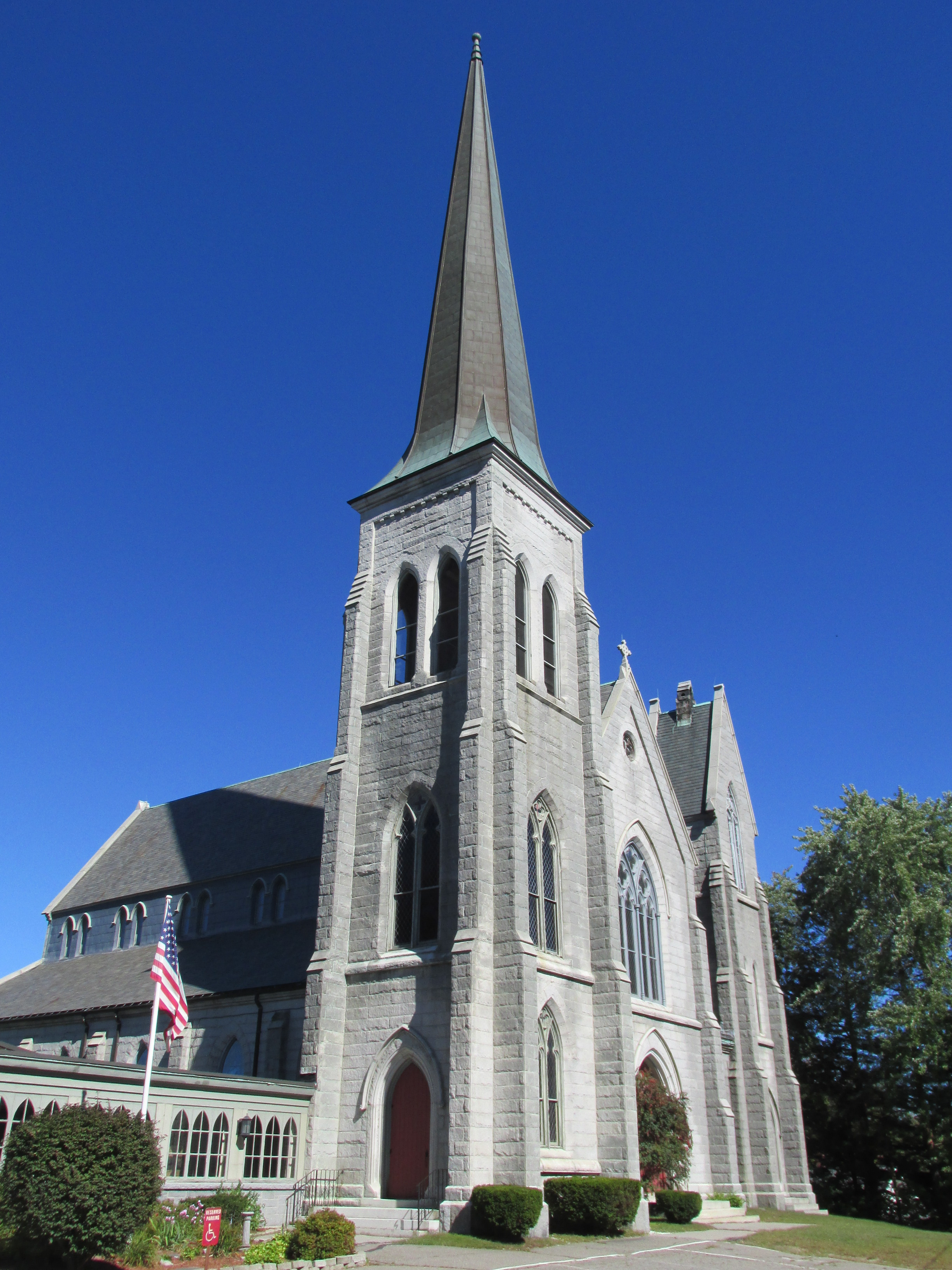
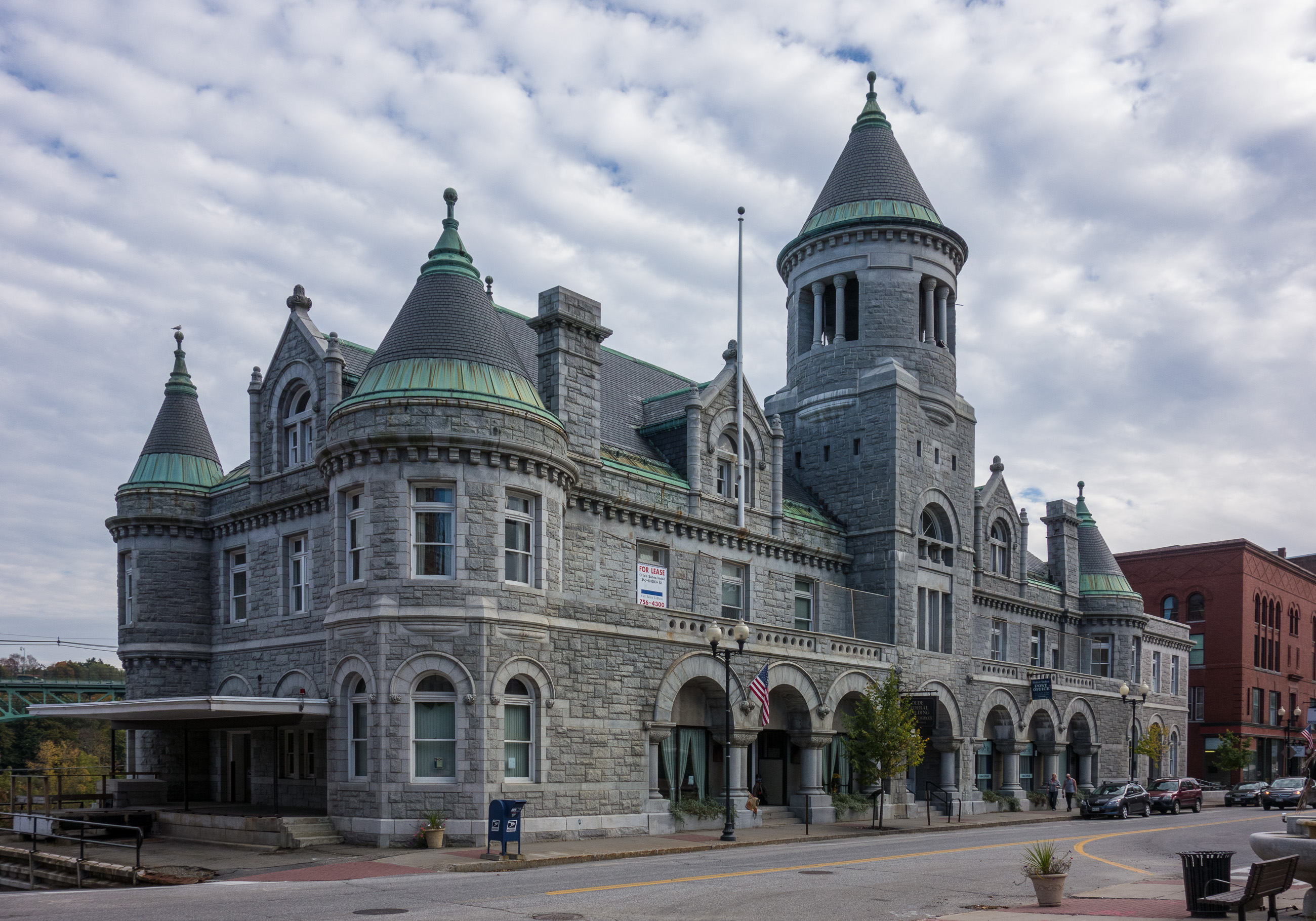
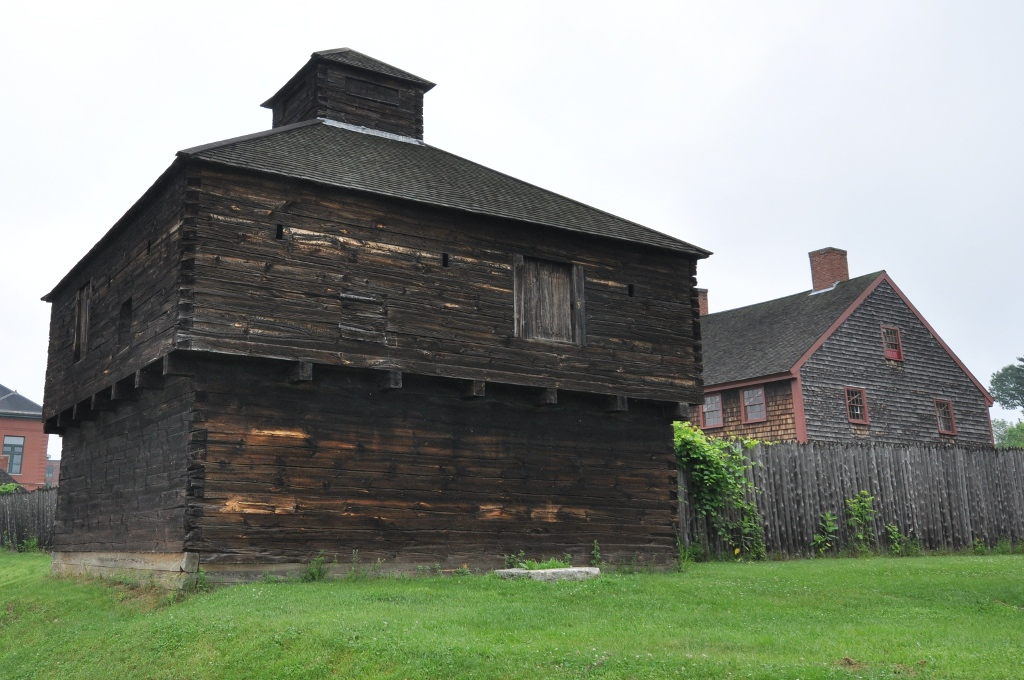
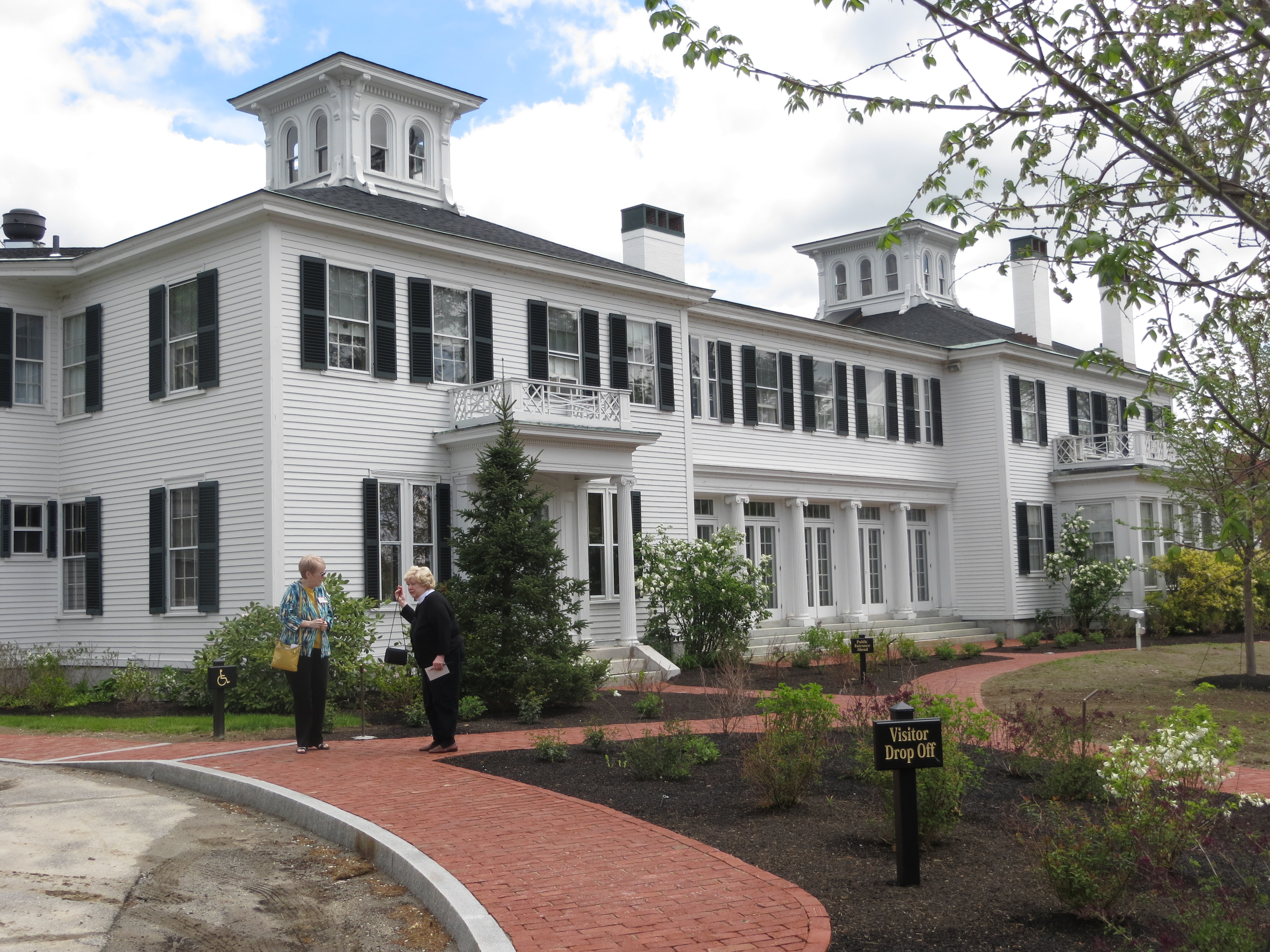
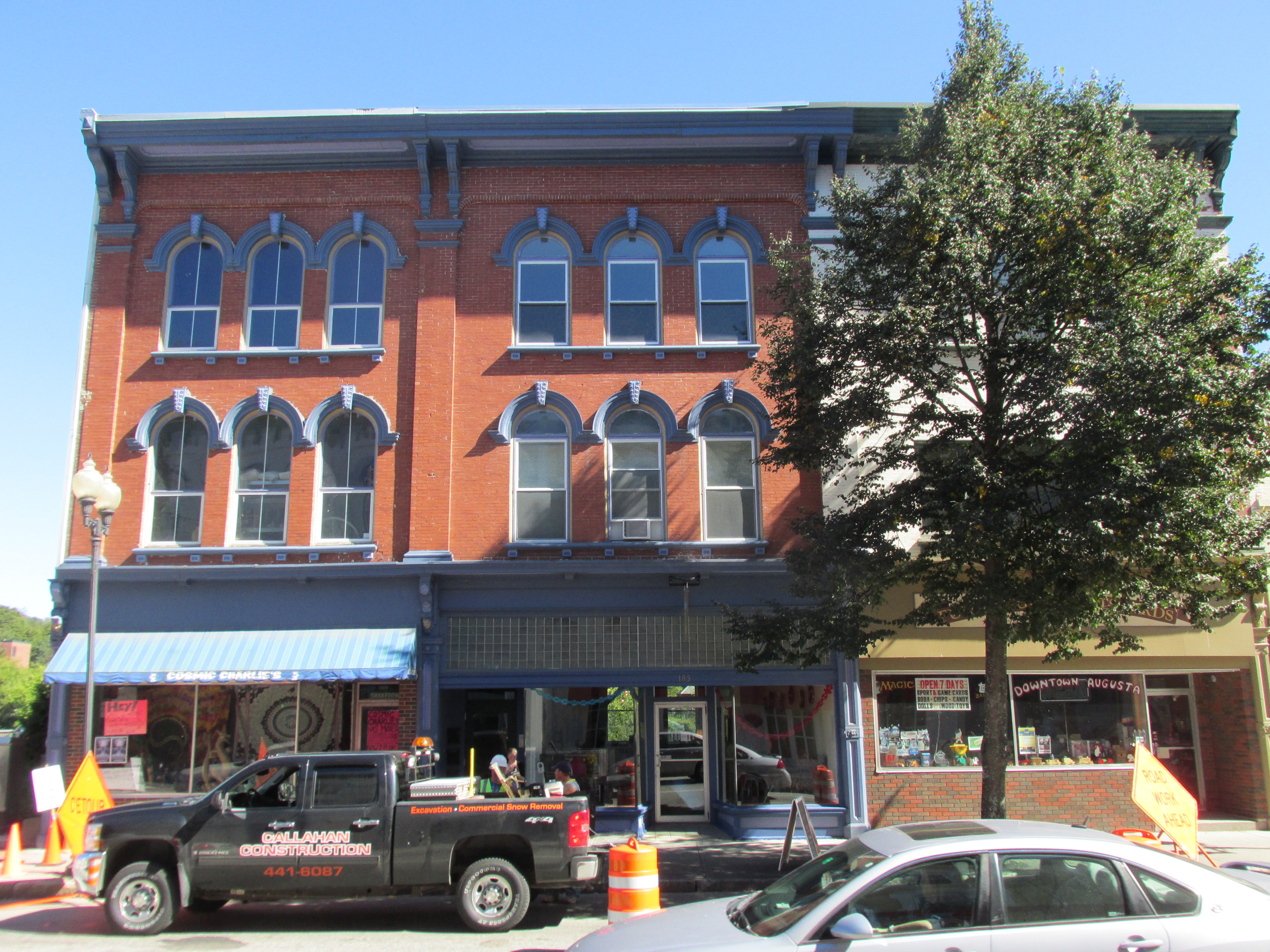
- Downtown along the Kennebec River Maine State House South Parish Church Old Post Office Fort Western Blaine House Williams Block

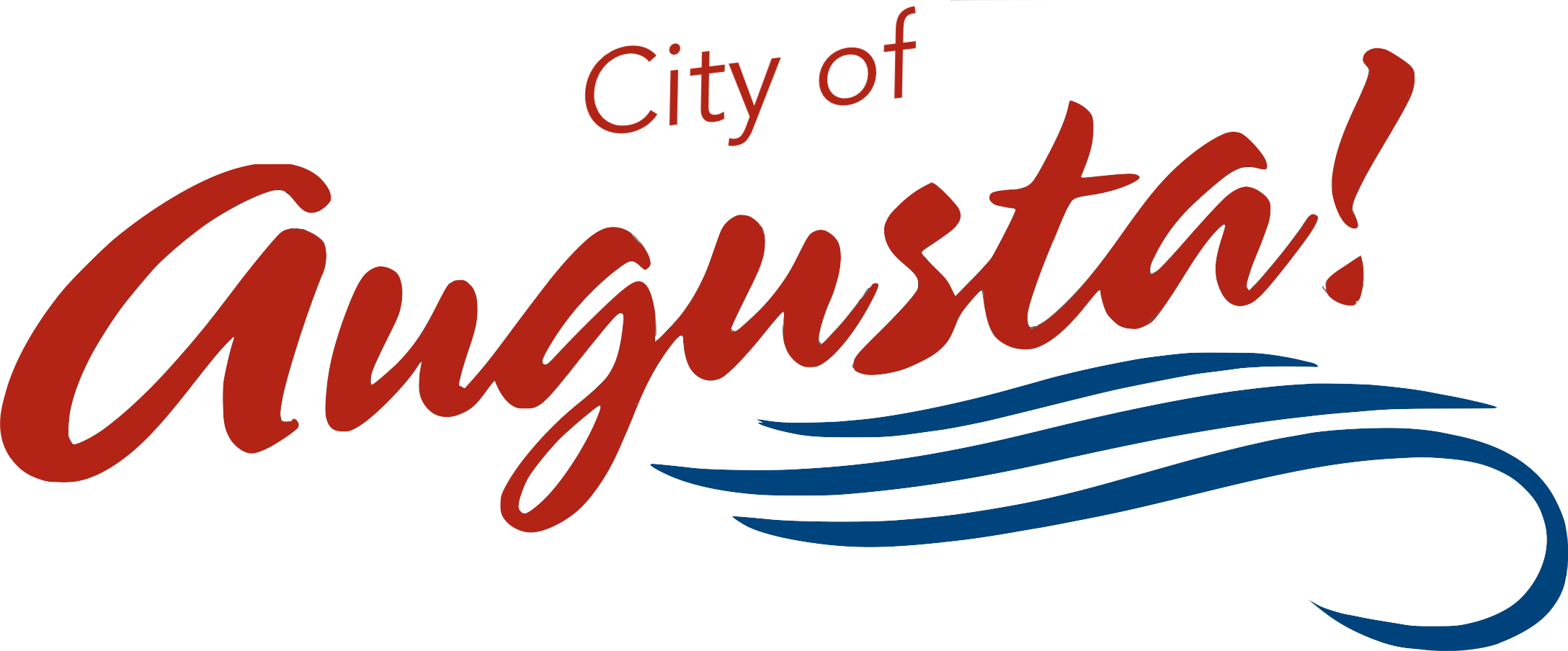
- Flag Seal Logo
- Motto: A Capital Opportunity
- Location in Kennebec County & the state of Maine

- Location within Maine Location within the United States
- Coordinates: 44°18′38″N 69°46′46″W
- Country: United States
- State: Maine
- County: Kennebec
- Settled: 1754
- Incorporated (town): February 20, 1797
- Incorporated (city): August 20, 1849
- Named for: Pamela Augusta Dearborn
- Village: North Augusta

Government
  - Mayor: Mark O'Brien

Area
  - Total: 58.04 sq mi (150.31 km^{2})
  - Land: 55.15 sq mi (142.83 km^{2})
  - Water: 2.89 sq mi (7.48 km^{2}) 5.00%
- Elevation: 174 ft (53 m)

Population (2020)
  - Total: 18,899
  - Density: 342.7/sq mi (132.32/km^{2})
- Time zone: UTC−05:00 (EST)
  - Summer (DST): UTC−04:00 (EDT)
- ZIP Codes: 04330, 04332-04333, 04336, 04338
- Area code: 207
- FIPS code: 23-02100
- GNIS feature ID: 582334
- Website: www.augustamaine.gov

Augusta (Note: /əˈɡʌstə/ ə-GUSS-tə) is the capital city of the U.S. state of Maine. The city's population was 18,899 at the 2020 United States census, making it the 12th-most populous city in Maine, and third-least populous state capital in the United States. (Note: After Montpelier, Vermont and Pierre, South Dakota) Augusta is the seat of and most populous city in Kennebec County.

English settlers from the Popham Colony at the mouth of the Kennebec River explored the area in 1607. Before European settlement, Algonquian-speaking Indians lived in the area. In 1625, representatives of Plymouth Colony chose the east shore of the Kennebec for a trading post, which was likely built in 1628 and became known as "Cushnoc". The Kennebec Proprietors, successors to the Plymouth Company, built Fort Western near the site of the abandoned trading post in 1754 and began settlement efforts. The new village was incorporated as Hallowell in 1771, and the upriver part of town separated in 1797 to form the town of Harrington. On June 9, 1797, Harrington changed its name to Augusta and, in 1827, it was designated capital of Maine.

Augusta is the easternmost state capital in the United States. Located on the Kennebec River at the head of tide, it is the principal city in the Augusta–Waterville micropolitan statistical area and home to the University of Maine at Augusta. Because of the city's position on the Kennebec, downtown Augusta is vulnerable to floods in spring. The Maine flood of 1987, known as the "Great Flood", affected the city. Bond Brook runs from northwest to southeast through the city center, and has been called the "Home of wild Atlantic Salmon".

The city has five different residential areas, including the "west side", a historic neighborhood north of the state capitol complex, and the "east side", which is situated on the opposite side of the Kennebec. The city's northwest quadrant includes both a retail center and neighborhoods. Augusta State Airport serves the city, offering both commercial service and general aviation. Although the airport is owned by the State of Maine, it is managed and operated by the city. Interstate 95 passes by the western outskirts of Augusta, and both U.S. 202 and U.S. 201 run through the city.

== History ==
The area was first explored by the English of the short-lived Popham Colony in September 1607. Twenty-one years later, English settlers from the Plymouth Colony settled in the area in 1628 as part of a trading post on the Kennebec River. The settlement was known by its Native American name Cushnoc (or Coussinoc or Koussinoc), meaning "head of the tide". Fur trading was at first profitable, but because of Native uprisings and declining revenues, Plymouth Colony sold the Kennebec Patent in 1661. Cushnoc would remain unoccupied for the next 75 years.

The area around Cushnoc was inhabited by the Kennebec, a band of the larger Abenaki nation. During the 17th century, they were on friendly terms with the English settlers in the region.

A hotbed of Abenaki hostility toward British settlements was located further up the Kennebec at Norridgewock. In 1722, the tribe and its allies attacked Fort Richmond (now Richmond) and destroyed Brunswick. In response, English forces sacked Norridgewock in 1724 during Dummer's War, when the English gained tentative control of the Kennebec.

During the height of the French and Indian War, in 1754, the English colonists built a blockhouse named Fort Western at Cushnoc on the eastern bank of the Kennebec River. It was intended as a supply depot for Fort Halifax upriver, as well as a regional defense from French attack. Later, during the American Revolutionary War, Benedict Arnold and his 1,100 troops would use Fort Western as a staging area before continuing their journey up the Kennebec to the Battle of Quebec.

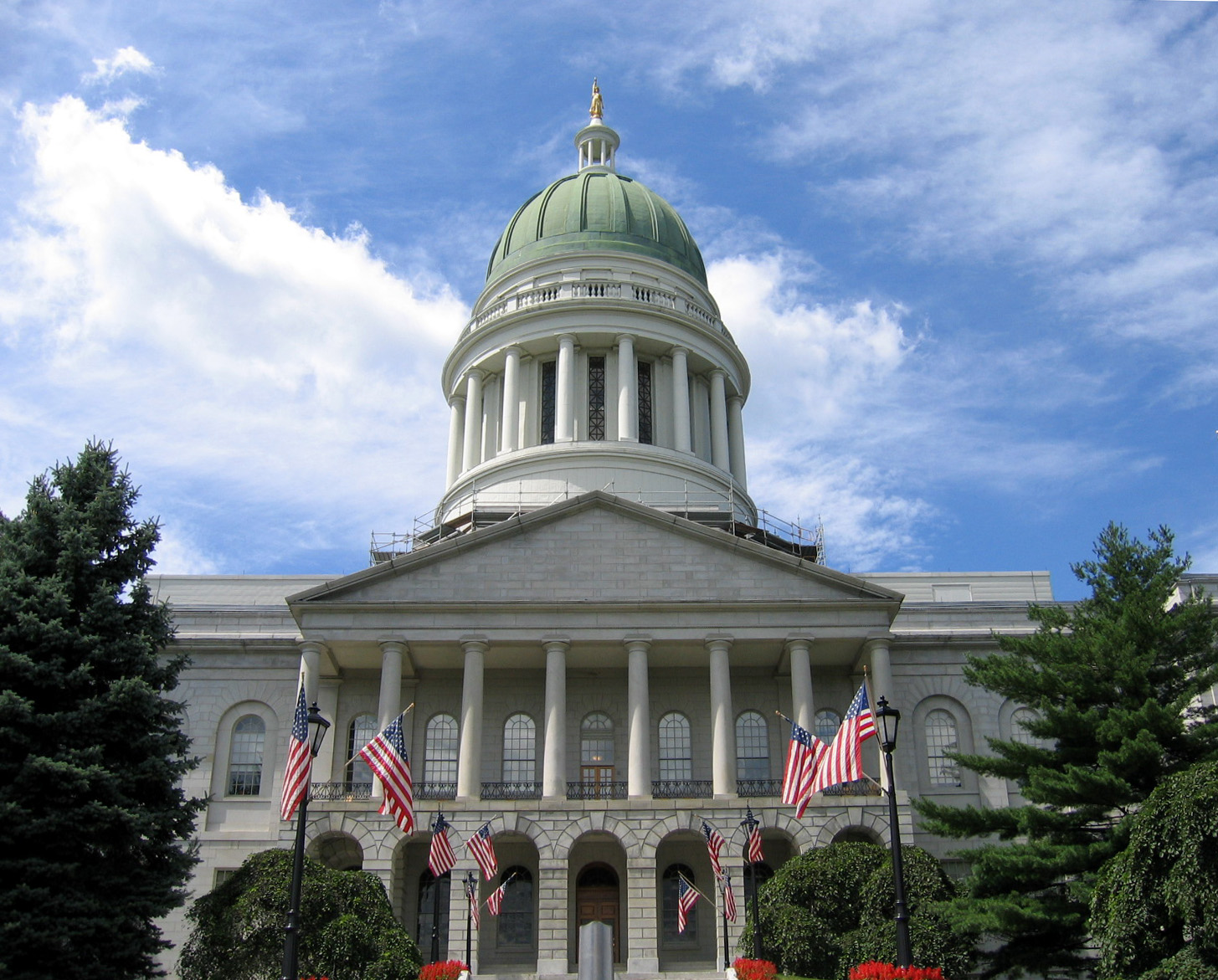
The Maine State House, built 1829–1832

Cushnoc was incorporated as part of Hallowell in 1771. Known as "the Fort", it was set off and incorporated by the Massachusetts General Court in February 1797 as Harrington. In August, however, the name was changed to Augusta after Pamela Augusta Dearborn, daughter of Henry Dearborn. In 1799, it was designated as the county seat for the newly created Kennebec County.

Maine became a state in 1820 as a result of the Missouri Compromise. Augusta was designated as its capital in 1827, over Portland, and rival communities Brunswick and Hallowell. The Maine State Legislature continued meeting in Portland, however, until the completion of the Maine State House in 1832, designed by Charles Bulfinch. Augusta was incorporated as a city in 1849. After being named the state capital and the introduction of new industry, the city flourished. In 1840 and 1850, the city ranked among the 100 largest urban populations in the country. During the next decade, however, the city was quickly bypassed by rapidly growing metropolises in the Midwest.

Excellent soil provided for agriculture, and water power from streams provided for the industry. In 1837, a dam was built across the Kennebec where the falls drop 15 feet at the head of a tide. By 1838, 10 sawmills were contracted. With the arrival of the Kennebec & Portland Railroad in 1851, Augusta became an even more productive mill town. In 1883, the property of A. & W. Sprague Company was purchased by the Edwards Manufacturing Company, which erected extensive brick mills for manufacturing cotton textiles. They imported cotton from the South for processing and export to Europe. In the late 19th century, a paper and pulp plant was constructed.

Other Augusta firms produced lumber, sash, doors, window shutters, broom handles, stone cutters' tools, shoes, headstones, ice and furniture. The city developed as a publishing and shipping center. As of 2024, health care, education, retail, and public administration contributed the majority of employment.

Since the mid-eighteenth century, there has been a military presence in Augusta. Fort Western has not had troops garrisoned there since the 1790s, but in 1828, the U.S. Government built an arsenal to protect their interests from Britain. During the Civil War, Augusta was a rendezvous point for Union soldiers traveling to the front. Many of the soldiers camped on the green in front of the capitol building. In 1862, Camp E.D. Keyes was established in the northwestern portion of the city.

During World War I, Camp Keyes was used as a mobilization and training camp for soldiers. The camp eventually became a headquarters for the Maine National Guard. In 1929, the state legislature approved the placement of the Augusta State Airport next to the camp. As the airport grew, the use of the camp as a training facility was no longer possible. Today, it is still used for administrative and logistical purposes by the National Guard.

In the 19th century, Augusta got a regular steamboat service and the railroad. The city installed gas lights in 1859. A telephone service was available in 1880 and a local hospital in 1898. In the early 20th century, Augusta built two movie houses and a film production studio.

== Downtown revitalization ==
For much of Augusta's history, the central business district was on and near Water Street on the west bank of the Kennebec River. The street, laid out in the late 1700s, was the location of the area's commercial and industrial life. Many fires damaged this concentrated area, including one in 1865 that destroyed nearly 100 buildings. In 1890, the first trolley line began operation down Water Street, connecting Augusta with Gardiner and Hallowell to the south.

In 1932, buses replaced the trolley line. With the completion of the Maine Turnpike and Interstate 95 in 1955, local commercial developments began to move away from Water Street and closer to the highway. Among the results was a storefront vacancy rate downtown of about 60 percent.

Since the late 2000s, there has been a renewed and ongoing focus by city officials, the Augusta Downtown Alliance, and private developers to revitalize the downtown area.

== Geography ==
Augusta is the easternmost state capital in the United States. According to the United States Census Bureau, the city has a total area of 58.03 sq mi (150.30 km^{2}), of which 55.13 sq mi (142.79 km^{2}) is land and 2.90 sq mi (7.51 km^{2}) is water. Augusta is drained by Bond's Brook, Woromontogus Stream and the Kennebec River.

=== Roads ===
The city is crossed by Interstate 95, U.S. Route 201, State Route 11, U.S. Route 202, State Route 9, State Route 3, State Route 100, State Route 27, State Route 8, State Route 104, and State Route 105.

=== Bordering ===
Augusta borders the towns of Manchester to its west, Sidney and Vassalboro to its north, Windsor to its east, Chelsea to its south, and the city of Hallowell to its southwest.

=== Climate ===
Augusta's climate is classified as a humid continental climate (Köppen: Dfb). Summers are typically warm, rainy, and occasionally humid. Winters are bitterly cold, windy, and snowy. The spring season is almost non-existent, while fall is usually mild and drier. Conditions can vary, depending on wind direction and jet stream positioning.

The hottest month is July, with an average high temperature of 80 °F (26.7 °C). The coldest month is January, with an average low of 10 °F (−12.2 °C). Most snowfall occurs from December through March. Snowfall is not uncommon in April and November, though snow is rare in May and October.

Climate data for Augusta, Maine (Augusta State Airport), 1991–2020 normals, extremes 1948–present
Month	Jan	Feb	Mar	Apr	May	Jun	Jul	Aug	Sep	Oct	Nov	Dec	Year
Record high °F (°C)	61 (16)	64 (18)	85 (29)	90 (32)	94 (34)	100 (38)	99 (37)	100 (38)	96 (36)	87 (31)	77 (25)	67 (19)	100 (38)
Mean maximum °F (°C)	49.7 (9.8)	48.7 (9.3)	59.4 (15.2)	74.5 (23.6)	85.5 (29.7)	89.4 (31.9)	90.7 (32.6)	89.9 (32.2)	86.0 (30.0)	74.6 (23.7)	63.7 (17.6)	53.5 (11.9)	93.1 (33.9)
Mean daily maximum °F (°C)	28.8 (−1.8)	31.9 (−0.1)	40.6 (4.8)	53.5 (11.9)	65.8 (18.8)	74.4 (23.6)	79.9 (26.6)	78.9 (26.1)	70.9 (21.6)	57.9 (14.4)	45.7 (7.6)	34.7 (1.5)	55.2 (12.9)
Daily mean °F (°C)	20.4 (−6.4)	23.2 (−4.9)	32.0 (0.0)	43.8 (6.6)	55.3 (12.9)	64.2 (17.9)	70.1 (21.2)	68.9 (20.5)	61.0 (16.1)	49.2 (9.6)	38.0 (3.3)	27.2 (−2.7)	46.1 (7.8)
Mean daily minimum °F (°C)	12.1 (−11.1)	14.4 (−9.8)	23.4 (−4.8)	34.2 (1.2)	44.7 (7.1)	54.1 (12.3)	60.3 (15.7)	58.8 (14.9)	51.0 (10.6)	40.4 (4.7)	30.3 (−0.9)	19.8 (−6.8)	37.0 (2.8)
Mean minimum °F (°C)	−7.6 (−22.0)	−4.1 (−20.1)	4.0 (−15.6)	23.8 (−4.6)	34.4 (1.3)	44.2 (6.8)	52.5 (11.4)	49.6 (9.8)	37.8 (3.2)	28.4 (−2.0)	16.2 (−8.8)	1.3 (−17.1)	−9.7 (−23.2)
Record low °F (°C)	−22 (−30)	−23 (−31)	−11 (−24)	9 (−13)	26 (−3)	36 (2)	43 (6)	39 (4)	28 (−2)	21 (−6)	4 (−16)	−15 (−26)	−23 (−31)
Average precipitation inches (mm)	2.62 (67)	2.32 (59)	3.21 (82)	3.82 (97)	3.27 (83)	4.01 (102)	3.20 (81)	3.41 (87)	3.90 (99)	4.69 (119)	3.95 (100)	3.44 (87)	41.84 (1,063)
Average snowfall inches (cm)	19.0 (48)	14.8 (38)	15.2 (39)	4.5 (11)	0.0 (0.0)	0.0 (0.0)	0.0 (0.0)	0.0 (0.0)	0.0 (0.0)	0.3 (0.76)	3.6 (9.1)	13.9 (35)	71.3 (181)
Average precipitation days (≥ 0.01 in)	10.1	9.5	11.0	11.9	13.1	12.7	12.2	10.7	10.2	12.3	11.3	12.3	137.3
Average snowy days (≥ 0.1 in)	8.7	6.9	6.1	1.9	0.0	0.0	0.0	0.0	0.0	0.3	2.8	6.9	33.6
Source: NOAA (snow 1981–2010)

See or edit raw graph data.

== Demographics ==
Historical population
Census	Pop.	Note	%±
1800	1,211		—
1810	1,805		49.1%
1820	2,457		36.1%
1830	3,980		62.0%
1840	5,314		33.5%
1850	8,225		54.8%
1860	7,609		−7.5%
1870	7,808		2.6%
1880	8,665		11.0%
1890	10,527		21.5%
1900	11,683		11.0%
1910	13,211		13.1%
1920	14,114		6.8%
1930	17,198		21.9%
1940	19,360		12.6%
1950	20,913		8.0%
1960	21,680		3.7%
1970	21,945		1.2%
1980	21,819		−0.6%
1990	21,325		−2.3%
2000	18,560		−13.0%
2010	19,136		3.1%
2020	18,899		−1.2%
U.S. Decennial Census

=== 2020 census ===
As of the 2020 census, Augusta had a population of 18,899. The median age was 44.1 years. 17.4% of residents were under the age of 18 and 22.2% were 65 years of age or older. For every 100 females there were 95.3 males, and for every 100 females age 18 and over there were 94.4 males age 18 and over.

73.7% of residents lived in urban areas, while 26.3% lived in rural areas.

There were 8,924 households in Augusta, of which 20.6% had children under the age of 18 living in them. Of all households, 33.3% were married-couple households, 23.8% were households with a male householder and no spouse or partner present, and 32.8% were households with a female householder and no spouse or partner present. About 41.6% of all households were made up of individuals and 17.2% had someone living alone who was 65 years of age or older.

There were 9,885 housing units, of which 9.7% were vacant. The homeowner vacancy rate was 1.5% and the rental vacancy rate was 7.0%.

Racial composition as of the 2020 census
Race	Number	Percent
White	16,918	89.5%
Black or African American	229	1.2%
American Indian and Alaska Native	106	0.6%
Asian	418	2.2%
Native Hawaiian and Other Pacific Islander	12	0.1%
Some other race	162	0.9%
Two or more races	1,054	5.6%
Hispanic or Latino (of any race)	510	2.7%

=== 2010 census ===
As of the census of 2010, there were 19,136 people, 8,802 households, and 4,490 families residing in the city. The population density was 347.1/sq mi (134.0/km^{2}). There were 9,756 housing units at an average density of 177.0/sq mi (68.3/km^{2}). The racial makeup of the city was 94.1% White, 1.1% African American, 0.7% Native American, 1.5% Asian, 0.1% Pacific Islander, 0.4% from other races, and 2.3% from two or more races. Hispanic or Latino of any race were 1.8% of the population.

There were 8,802 households, of which 23.0% had children under the age of 18 living with them, 35.2% were married couples living together, 11.8% had a female householder with no husband present, 4.0% had a male householder with no wife present, and 49.0% were non-families. 39.8% of all households were made up of individuals, and 13.6% had someone living alone who was 65 years of age or older. The average household size was 2.08 and the average family size was 2.76.

The median age in the city was 43.2 years. 18.3% of residents were under the age of 18; 8.1% were between the ages of 18 and 24; 26% were from 25 to 44; 29.4% were from 45 to 64; and 18% were 65 years of age or older. The gender makeup of the city was 48.6% male and 51.4% female.

=== 2000 census ===
As of the census of 2000, there were 18,560 people, 8,565 households, and 4,607 families residing in the city. The population density was 335.1 inhabitants per square mile (129.4/km^{2}). There were 9,480 housing units at an average density of 171.2 per square mile (66.1/km^{2}). The racial makeup of the city was 96.21% White, 0.50% Black or African American, 0.48% Native American, 1.35% Asian, 0.01% Pacific Islander, 0.16% from other races, and 1.3% from two or more races. 0.86% of the population were Hispanic or Latino of any race.

There were 8,565 households, out of which 24.3% had children under the age of 18 living with them, 39.1% were married couples living together, 10.9% had a female householder with no husband present, and 46.2% were non-families. 38.3% of all households were made up of individuals, and 14.2% had someone living alone who was 65 years of age or older. The average household size was 2.10 and the average family size was 2.77.

In the city, the population was spread out, with 20.5% under the age of 18, 8.7% from 18 to 24, 28.3% from 25 to 44, 24.8% from 45 to 64, and 17.7% who were 65 years of age or older. The median age was 40 years. For every 100 females, there were 89.9 males. For every 100 females age 18 and over, there were 87.5 males.

The median income for a household in the city was $29,921, and the median income for a family was $42,230. Males had a median income of $31,209 versus $22,548 for females. The per capita income for the city was $19,145. About 11.4% of families and 15.0% of the population were below the poverty line, including 19.2% of those under age 18 and 9.8% of those age 65 or over.

== Government ==
=== Local government ===
Augusta is governed by a mayor and council-manager system. The City Council oversees all City government activities and establishes the legislative policies of the city, adopts and amends ordinances and local laws, appropriates municipal resources, and sets the tax rate. The City Manager serves as the chief executive officer and purchasing agent of the city. The mayor presides at all meetings of the council, and is recognized ceremonially as the official head of the city.

The city maintains a police department; it is remarkable for not having had an officer killed in the line of duty for over a century.

=== Political makeup ===
Augusta has historically been Democratic. In the 2012 presidential election, Barack Obama received 5,192 of the votes to Mitt Romney's 3,339.

In the 2020 presidential election, Joe Biden won 5,248 votes to Donald Trump's 4,155.

The city has not voted for a Republican presidential candidate since George H. W. Bush in the Republican landslide of 1988. Democrats are the majority political affiliation in all four voting wards. There are more voters who are not enrolled than there are registered Republicans in the city.

Voter registration

Voter Registration and Party Enrollment as of November 2012
Party	Total Voters	Percentage
Democratic	4,780	34.82%
Unenrolled	4,778	34.81%
Republican	3,656	26.64%
Green Independent	512	3.73%
Total	13,726	100%

Voter Registration and Party Enrollment as of November 2025
Party	Total Voters	Percentage
Democratic	4,388	34.32%
Unenrolled	3,917	30.64%
Republican	3,851	30.12%
Green Independent	540	4.22%
Libertarian Party	89	0.7%
Total	12,785	100%

== Education ==
The Augusta School Department is the public K-12 school district. There are five public schools, one private school, and one college (the University of Maine at Augusta). There are two public libraries in Augusta, the city-operated Lithgow Public Library and the Maine State Library.

Farrington, Gilbert, Hussey, and Lincoln are the four public elementary schools that are located in the city. Cony Middle and High School serves students in grades 7–12 from Augusta and the surrounding towns.

St. Michael School (of the Diocese of Portland) is a private Catholic school; it charges tuition to its students.

The University of Maine at Augusta is third-largest university in the University of Maine System.

== Media ==
=== Printed media ===
- Kennebec Journal, daily newspaper for capital area
- Uncle Henry's, former weekly classified adverts publication

=== Radio ===
- WJZN, oldies
- WMDR, religious
- WMME-FM, top-40
- WTOS-FM, rock
- WVQM, talk
- WWTP, religious

=== Television ===
Augusta is part of the Portland, Maine television market, and receives most of that market's channels. WCBB channel 10, licensed to Augusta, is the local television outlet for the Maine Public Broadcasting Network.

== Transportation ==
Interstate 95 passes by the western outskirts of Augusta. U.S. 202 runs east–west through the city. U.S. 201 runs north–south through the city.

Intercity bus service is provided by Greyhound Lines and Concord Coach Lines.

Augusta State Airport (AUG), in the western part of the city, has commercial flights.

== Sites of interest ==
- Blaine House
- Fort Western
- Holocaust and Human Rights Center of Maine at the University of Maine at Augusta
- Lithgow Public Library
- Maine State House
- Maine State Museum
- Viles Arboretum
- Kennebec Arsenal
- Augusta Mental Health Institute

== Notable people ==
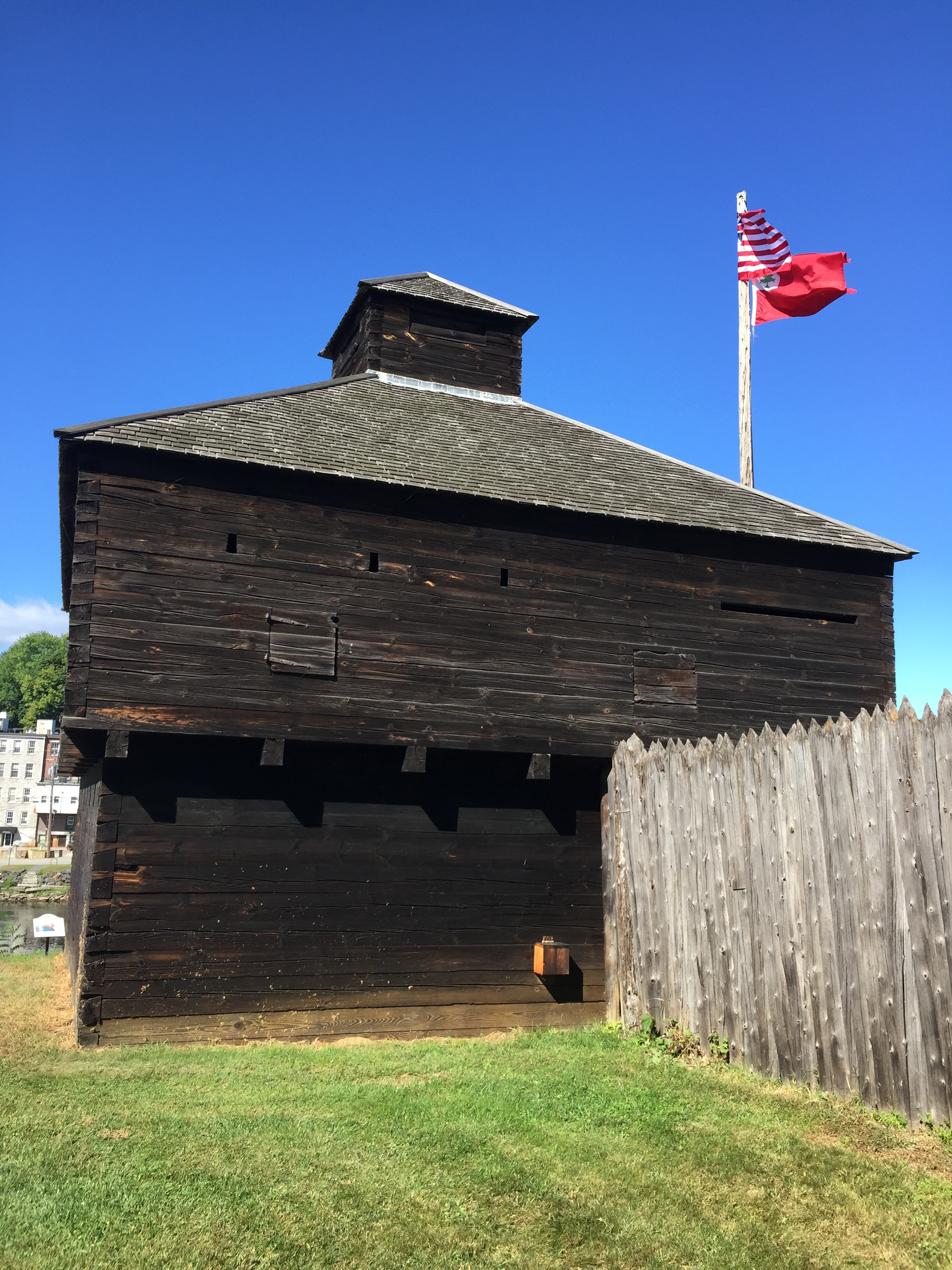
Old Fort Western

- Ambrose Abbott, former member, Maine Senate
- Martha Ballard, midwife
- James G. Blaine, former U.S. Secretary of State and 1884 Republican presidential nominee
- Horatio Bridge, U.S. Navy officer during the American Civil War
- William Bridgeo, state representative and resident of Augusta
- Julia Clukey, 2010 Olympic luger
- Beverly Daggett, President, Maine Senate
- Olive E. Dana, short-story writer, essayist, poet
- Melville Fuller, former Chief Justice, United States Supreme Court
- George Huntington Hartford, owner of Great Atlantic and Pacific Tea Company (A&P), the country's largest food retailer at the time of his death
- John F. Hill, former Maine governor
- Elizabeth Ellis Hoyt, American economist
- Robert Deniston Hume, Oregon politician and businessman
- Eastman Johnson, artist
- Roger Katz, mayor of Augusta and state legislator
- George W. Ladd, U.S. congressman
- Dorianne Laux, poet
- Sumner Lipman, state legislator and attorney
- Henry A. McMasters, recipient of the Medal of Honor
- Rachel Nichols, actress
- Frederick G. Payne, Mayor of Augusta and 60th governor of Maine
- David Peoples, athlete and golfer
- Frederick W. Plaisted, mayor of Augusta, 48th governor of Maine
- John F. Potter, U.S. congressman, judge
- Travis Roy, hockey player
- Luther Severance, publisher, U.S. congressman and senator
- Olympia Snowe, former U.S. senator
- John L. Stevens, U.S. minister to Kingdom of Hawaii, accused of attempting to overthrow Hawaiian queen, 1893
- Judith Tarr, fantasy and science fiction author
- Manch Wheeler, quarterback with the Buffalo Bills
- Gil Whitney, television news anchorman and meteorologist
- Reuel Williams, U.S. senator
- Willard G. Wyman, general

== See also ==
- USS Augusta, 2 ships
