= Mount Pleasant House =

Mount Pleasant House may refer to:

- Mount Pleasant House (California), a historic residence listed on the National Register of Historic Places
- Mount Pleasant House (New Hampshire), a grand hotel built in 1875 and demolished in 1939
