= South Parish Congregational Church and Parish House =

Historic church in Maine, United States

- U.S. National Register of Historic Places
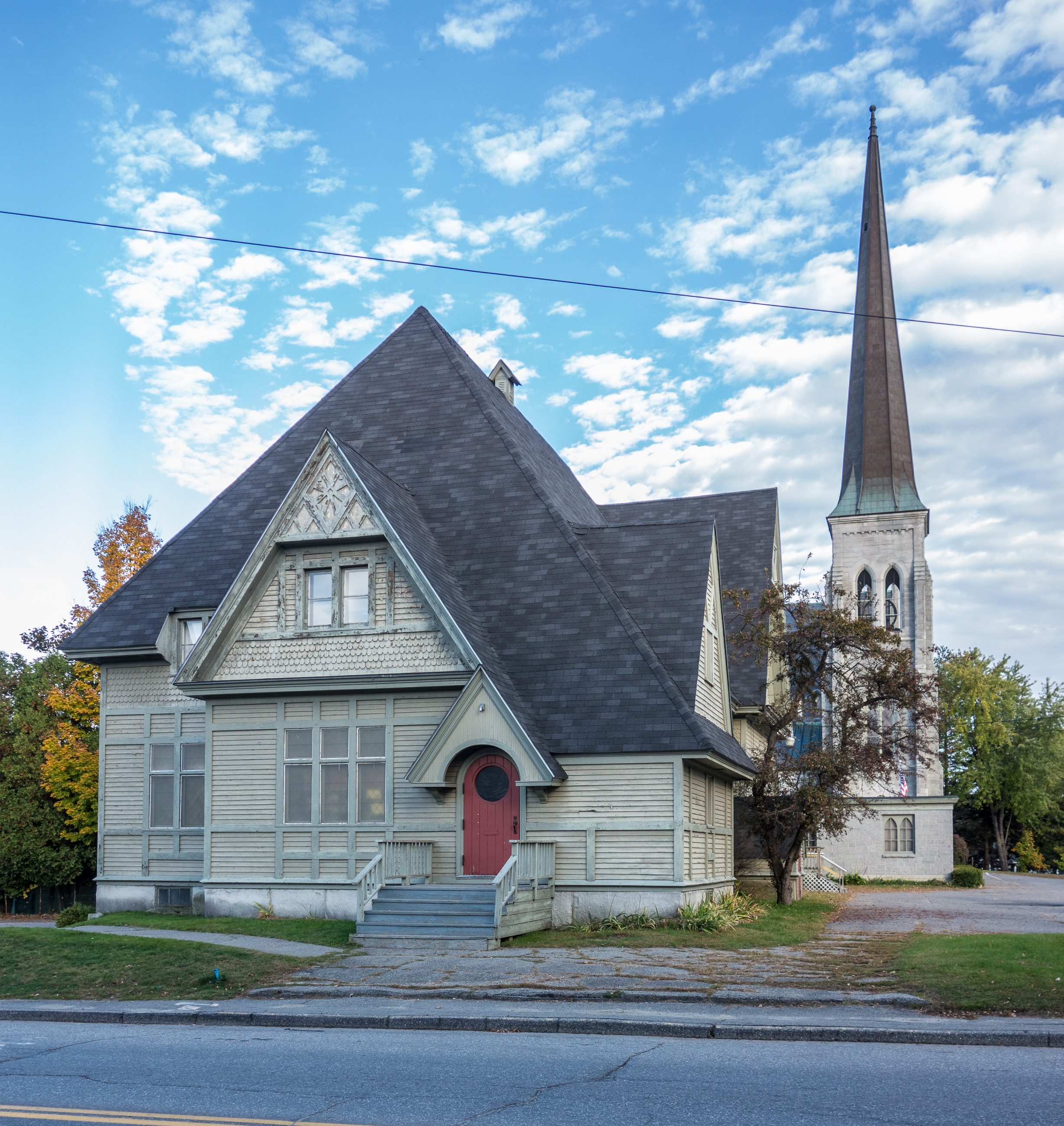
- South Parish Congregational Church (rear) and Parish House (front) in 2013

- Location within Maine Location within the United States
- Location: 9 Church St., Augusta, Maine
- Coordinates: 44°19′2″N 69°46′33″W
- Area: 1 acre (0.40 ha)
- Built: 1865
- Architect: Fassett, Francis H.; Cochrane, James H.
- Architectural style: Stick-Eastlake, Gothic Revival
- NRHP reference No.: 80000235
- Added to NRHP: June 22, 1980

The South Parish Congregational Church and Parish House is a historic church at 9 Church Street in Augusta, Maine. Built in 1865, the church is a major Gothic Revival work of Maine's leading mid-19th century architect, Francis H. Fassett, and its 1889 parish house, designed by James H. Cochrane, is a rare example in the state of Stick style architecture. The property was listed on the National Register of Historic Places in 1980. The congregation was established in 1773, when the area was part of Hallowell.

== Description and history ==
The South Parish Congregational Church is located in central Augusta, on a lot bounded by Bridge, State, and Church Streets. The parish house is located on the western part of the lot, and is joined to the south-facing church by a connector. The church is an elaborate example of the Gothic Revival in granite, with a gabled slate roof broken by a clerestory. The front facade is in three sections, with the primary tower on the left and a secondary tower on the right, with the main entrance in a Gothic-arched opening in between. A large stained glass window adorns the wall above the main entrance, and there is a small round window near the peak of the gable. Both towers have buttressed corners, the right one rising to a steeply pitched gable roof with stepped gables, while the more dominating left one rises to a third stage belfry and octagonal steeple with flared edges.

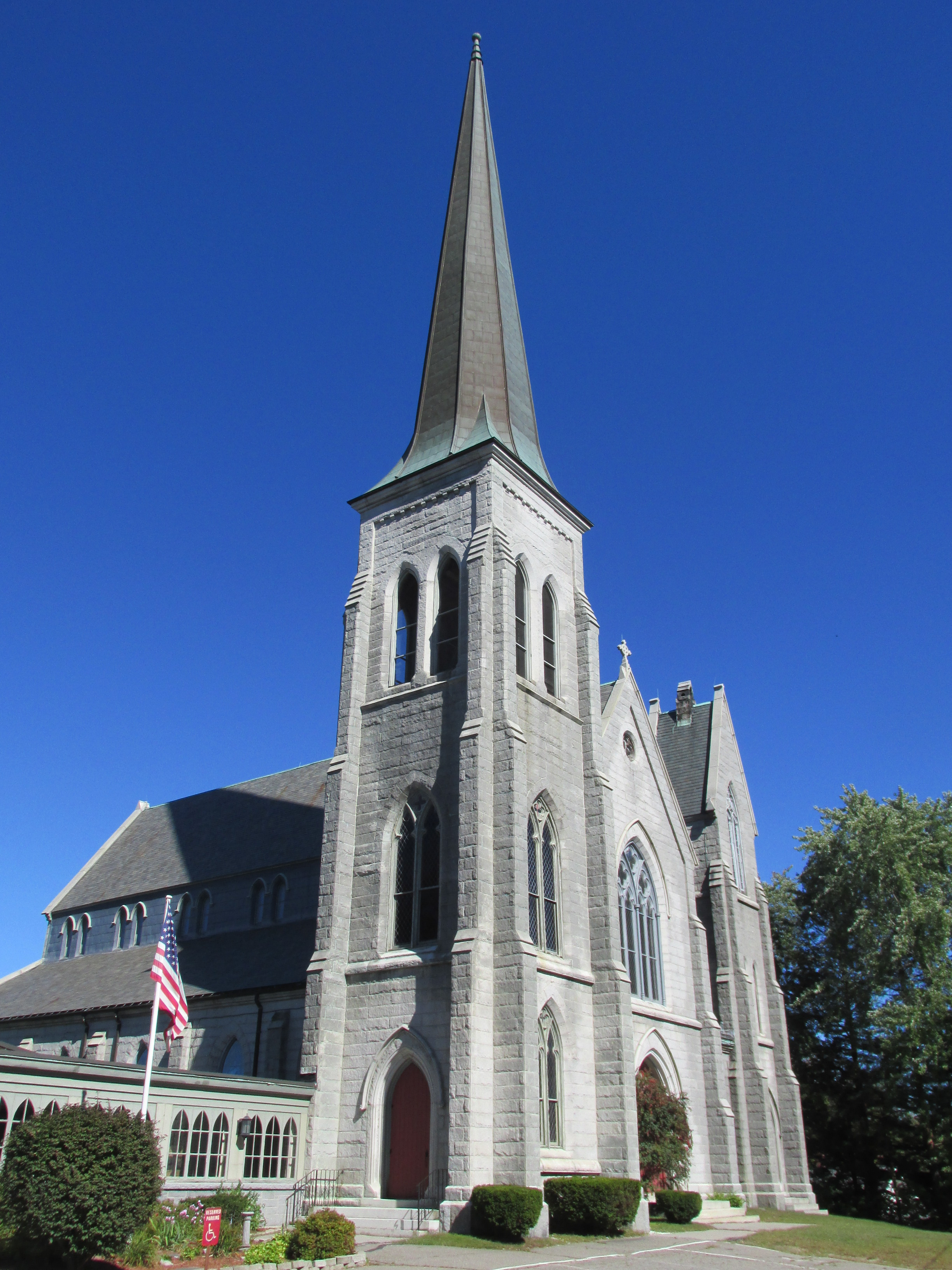
South Parish Congregational Church

In 1773, a congregational parish was organized in the town of Hallowell, which was divided into three in 1795, with this organization becoming the "middle" parish. It became Augusta's south parish when Augusta was separated from Hallowell in 1797. Its first meeting house was built in 1795, and its second in 1809. That church was struck by lightning and burned in 1864, and the present church was built in 1866 as its replacement. It is a mature work of Maine's leading mid-19th century architect, Francis H. Fassett, and is a local landmark. The parish house, added in 1889-90 to a design by Augusta architect James Cochrane, is one of Maine's few examples of high-style Stick style architecture.

== See also ==
- National Register of Historic Places listings in Kennebec County, Maine
