= Williams Block =

- U.S. National Register of Historic Places
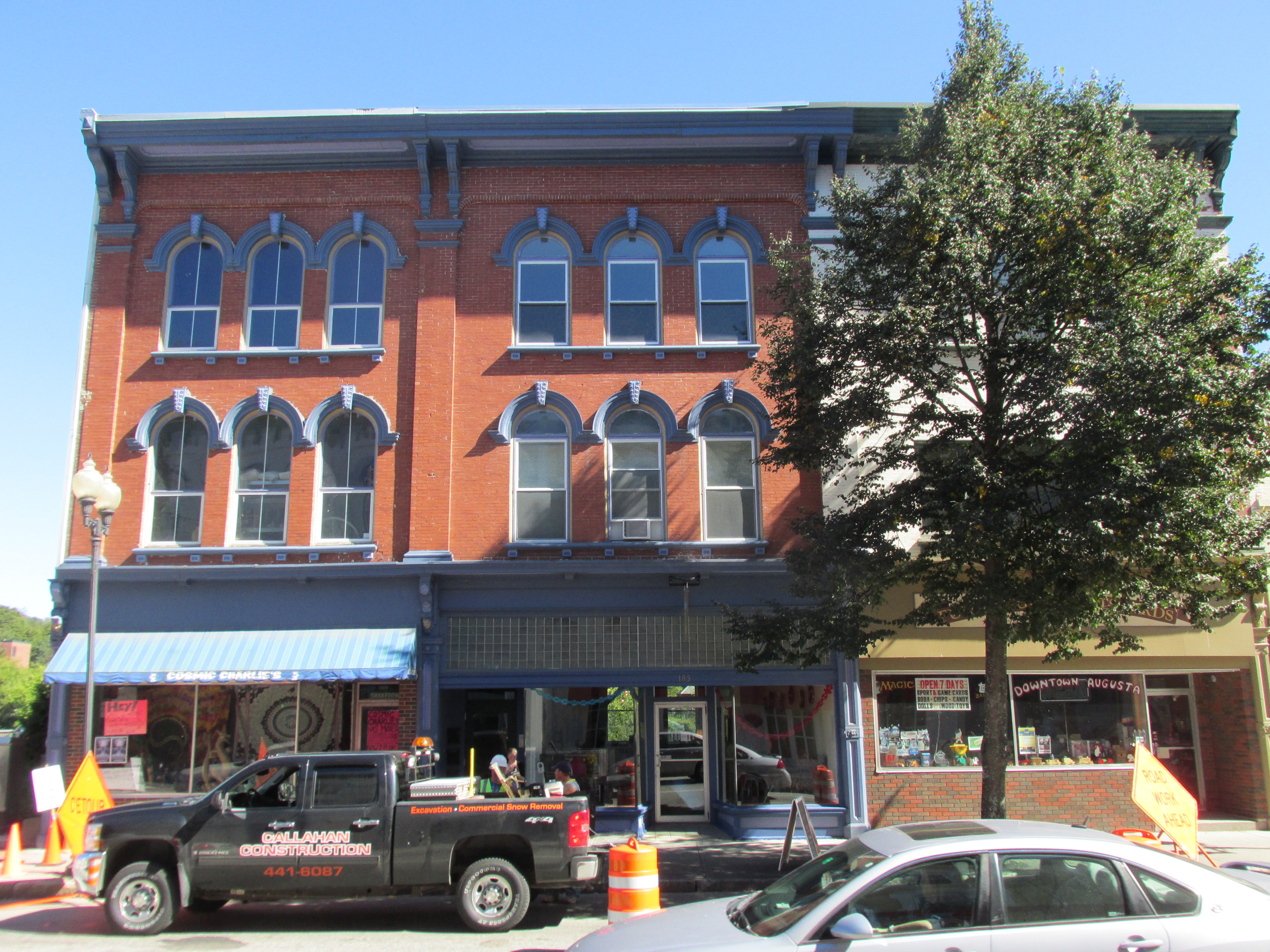

- Location within Maine
- Interactive map showing the location for Williams Block, Augusta
- Location: 183-187 Water St., Augusta, Maine
- Coordinates: 44°19′0″N 69°46′28″W
- Area: 0.3 acres (0.12 ha)
- Built: 1862
- Architect: Fassett, Francis; Williams, Ruel
- Architectural style: Italianate
- MPS: Augusta Central Business District MRA
- NRHP reference No.: 86001699
- Added to NRHP: May 2, 1986

The Williams Block is a historic commercial building at 183-187 Water Street in downtown Augusta, Maine. Built in 1862, it is the only remaining building south of Bridge Street to survive a devastating 1865 fire, and one of a small number of surviving commercial buildings (of many) designed by Francis H. Fassett. It was listed on the National Register of Historic Places in 1986.

== Description and history ==
The Williams Block stands on the east side of Water Street, Augusta's principal downtown thoroughfare, a short way south of its junction with Bridge Street. It is a three-story brick building, six bays wide, with a flat roof and projecting cornice. The ground floor is divided into two storefronts, each with a recessed entry and large display windows; one of them also has an original broad band of transom windows above. The upper floor bays are divided into groups of three, articulated by pilasters. The windows are set in rounded-arch openings, with keystoned molded hoods, and bracketed lintels that are joined together within each group.

The block was designed by Francis H. Fassett, then Maine's leading architect. It was built for Reuel Williams, then one of Augusta's leading businessmen and politicians. Although Fassett designed many buildings in Augusta, many of the commercial ones were destroyed in the 1865 fire, and this is the only one to survive. Fassett is credited with several early post-fire buildings in Water Street, some of which are located across the street from this one.

== See also ==
- National Register of Historic Places listings in Kennebec County, Maine
