= Portland Library Society =

Subscription library in Maine, US

The Portland Library Society (originally named Falmouth Library Society, also known as Portland Library) was a subscription library in Portland, Maine. The library "was originally established in 1763. It was revived in 1786, and re-established in 1806." Samuel Freeman served as librarian ca.1785-1807; followed by Oliver Bray (ca.1812–1817). New members were elected. The annual fee for each member was "two dollars per year in 1784 and fifteen dollars by 1801."

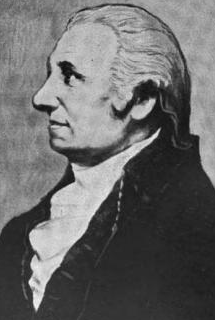
Portrait of Samuel Freeman, librarian

== History ==
=== Falmouth Library, 1763–1786 ===
The library was "originally instituted, 1763" in Falmouth, Province of Massachusetts Bay (later Portland, Maine). According to historian William Willis:

"In 1763, several gentlemen ... desirous of promoting the diffusion of useful knowledge, and extending the means of information, made some attempts to establish a library. In 1765 ... the first associates were Enoch Freeman, Benjamin Titcomb, Stephen Longfellow, Richard Codman, Edward Watts, Thomas Scales, Paul Prince, John Waite, Benjamin Waite, Enoch Ilsley, Jonathan Webb, Francis Waldo, Thomas Smith, Moses Pearson, James Gooding, Josiah Noyes, John Cox, Jeremiah Pote, Alexander Ross, Ebenezer Mayo, John Wiswall, Richard King, Jedediah Preble, Ephraim Jones, Stephen Waite, and John Waite, Jr. ... At the opening of the library in 1766, it contained but 93 volumes ... not one was printed in this country. ... We believe this to have been the first establishment of the kind in Maine. Not much addition was made to the books previous to the revolution."

Titles in the library ca.1766–1775:

- History of Peter Czar of Muscovy
- Lardner's history of the writers of the New Testament
- Leland's view of the Deistical writers
- London Magazine no.71-79
- Robert Millar's Propagation of Christianity
- Physico Theology
- Prospects of Mankind &c.
- Rapin's History of England v.85-91
- Ray's Wisdom of God
- The Reflector
- Ancient and Modern Universal History no.1-62

During the American Revolution, the British sacked the town of Falmouth, along with its "old town-house, with the publick library." By Willis' account, "in the destruction of the town, the little collection was widely dispersed and a number of the books lost: during the war its operations were entirely suspended until 1780, when an attempt was made to collect the fragments and restore them to use." The library was "revived, 1786." The local newspaper announced the Falmouth Library Society was "re-established upon such principles and rules as to render it a very useful institution. New members have lately been added."

=== Portland Library, 1787–1826 ===
After the town of Falmouth became "Portland" in 1786, the Falmouth Library Society became the "Portland Library Society." Several years later, the library was "re-established, 1806." Around 1826 the newly formed Portland Athenaeum bought the Portland Library for $1,640. By 1828, the Athenaeum reported: "We received in the Portland Social Library between 1,600 and 1,700 volumes. ... In looking over the catalogue of the Portland Library, though it contained a large number of works of standard merit, and perhaps quite as large a proportion of works of this character, as are usually found in libraries formed as this has been, by small additions made from year to year, and thus made up of the popular reading of the time."
