= Sacred Heart Church (Portland, Maine) =

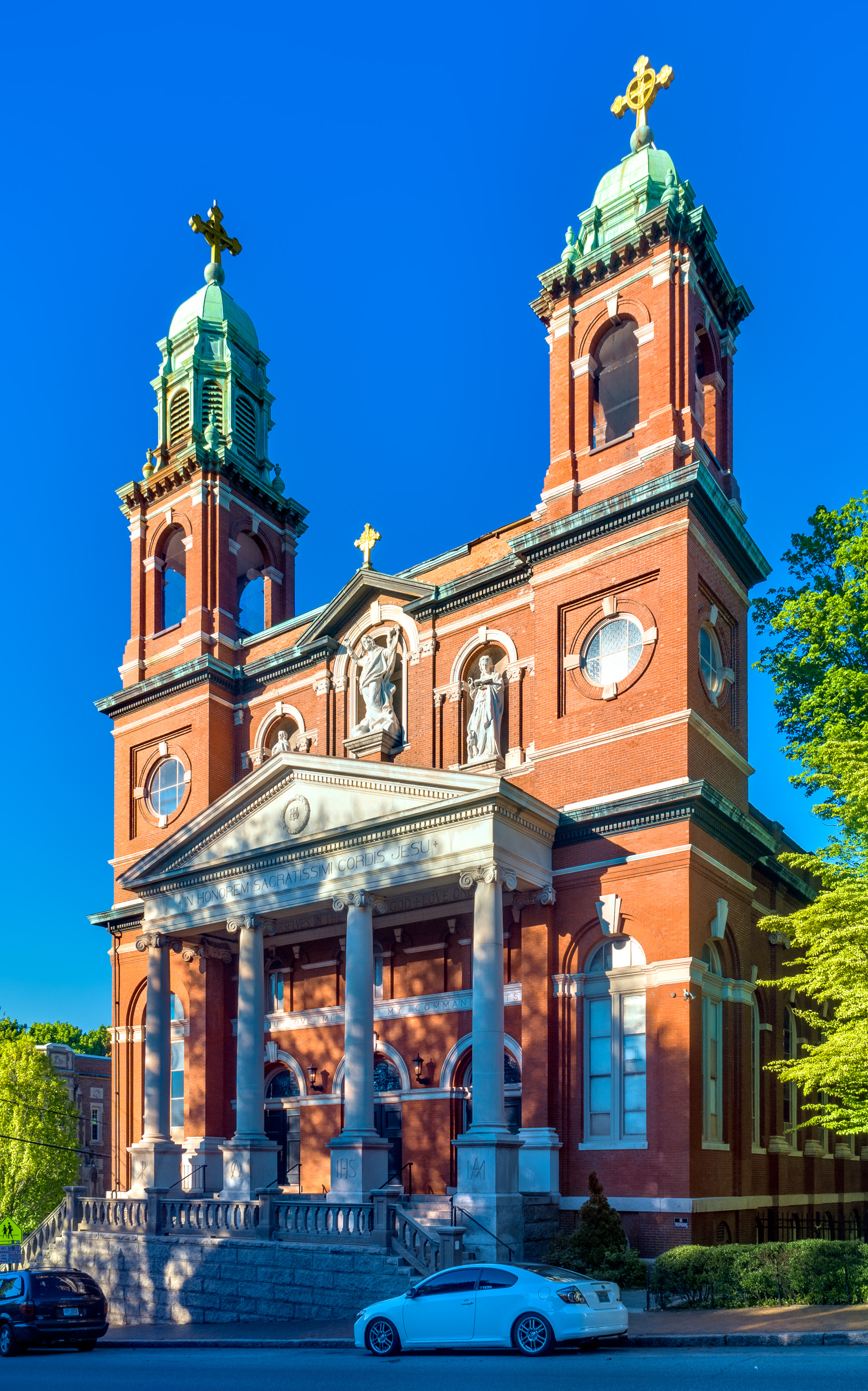

General information
- Type: Church
- Location: 65 Mellen Street, Portland, Maine
- Coordinates: 43.655337°N 70.270130°W
- Construction started: 1896
- Completed: 1915
- Owner: Roman Catholic Diocese of Portland

Design and construction
- Architects: Francis H. Fassett and Edward F. Fassett

Sacred Heart Church is an historic church building in Portland, Maine, owned by the Roman Catholic Diocese of Portland.

== History ==
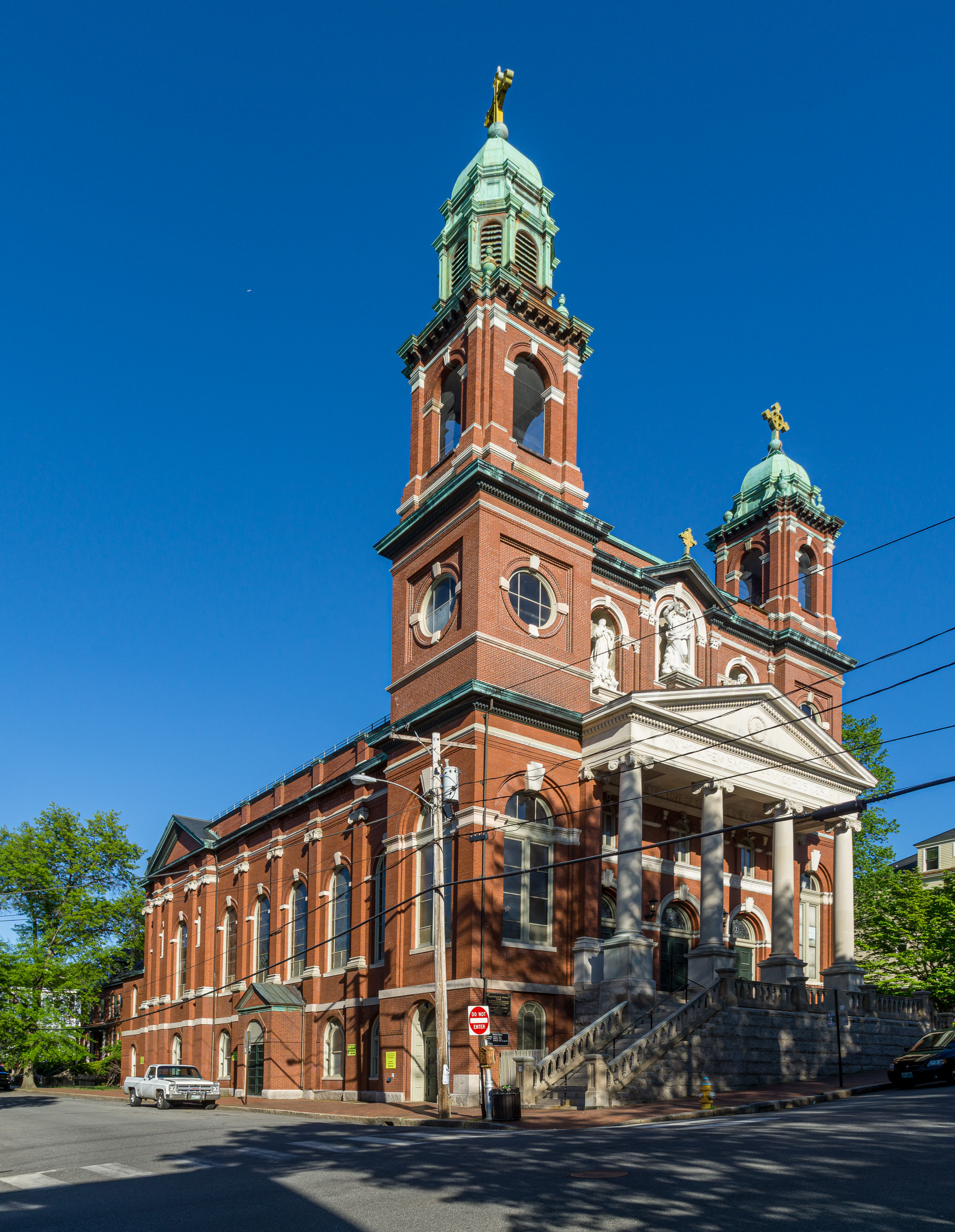
Sacred Heart/Saint Dominic Parish

Built between 1896 and 1915, it was designed in the Renaissance Revival style by architects Francis H. Fassett and Edward F. Fassett. It is modeled after the Marseille's Notre-Dame de la Garde basilica and was Francis Fassett's final commission before his 1906 death. Upon completion it became the city's third Catholic parish. Bishop James Augustine Healy appointed Irish-born Father John O'Dowd as its first pastor. The building's first mass was held on April 4, 1897.

In 1997, the Diocese closed nearby St. Dominic's Church and merged the parish into Sacred Heart to form the Sacred Heart/St. Dominic Parish.

Located in Portland's densely built and primarily working-class residential Parkside neighborhood, the church was founded to serve the city's large Irish-American population; however, by the 2000s, the parish had grown to include a significant population of immigrants, refugees, and asylum seekers from sub-Saharan Africa and Central America.

The church held its final mass October 25, 2026 after it was determined that needed repairs would cost $6M.

== Renovations ==
In 1999, $793,000 was raised to repair the roof and stone exterior; this work was completed in 2001. Further renovations were completed in early 2005.

In 2013, a $200,000 capital campaign began to raise funds to restore the church's bell tower, repair its bell, and repaint the window sashes. However, when renovations began, engineers discovered that more money was needed to repair the roof over the altar. In 2015, local historic preservation organization Greater Portland Landmarks placed Sacred Heart on its "Places in Peril" due to years of deferred maintenance and repairs and urged its supporters to help fund renovations.
