= Portland Public Library =

Public library in Portland, Maine, United States

Coordinates: 43°39′28″N 70°15′33″W

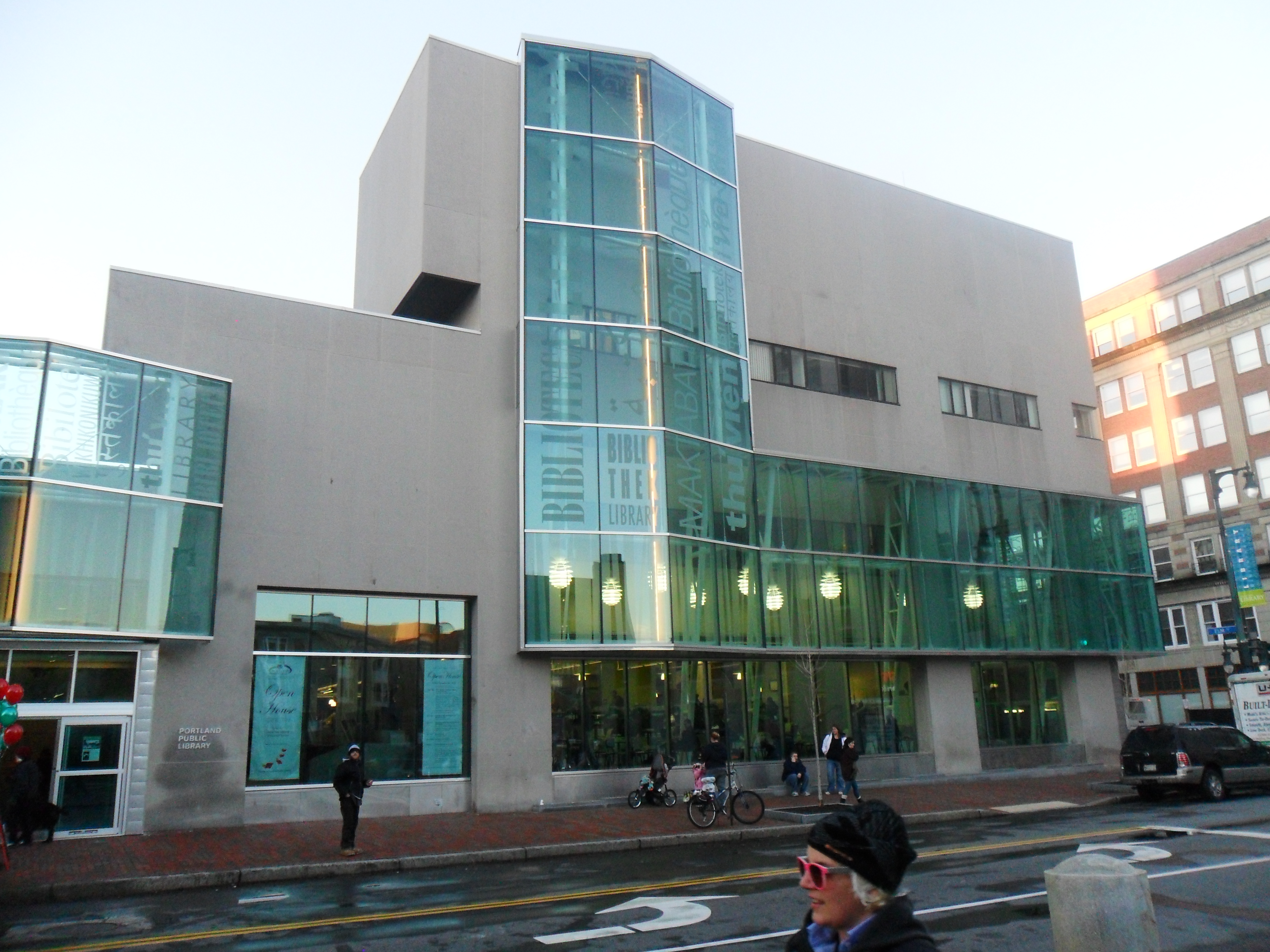
- Location: Portland, Maine, United States
- Type: Public
- Established: 1867
- Branches: 3 (Deering, Peaks Island, Riverton)

Collection
- Size: 238,815

Access and use
- Circulation: 895,000
- Population served: 66,194

Other information
- Budget: $3,861,396
- Director: Sarah Moore
- Employees: 94
- Website: www.portlandlibrary.com

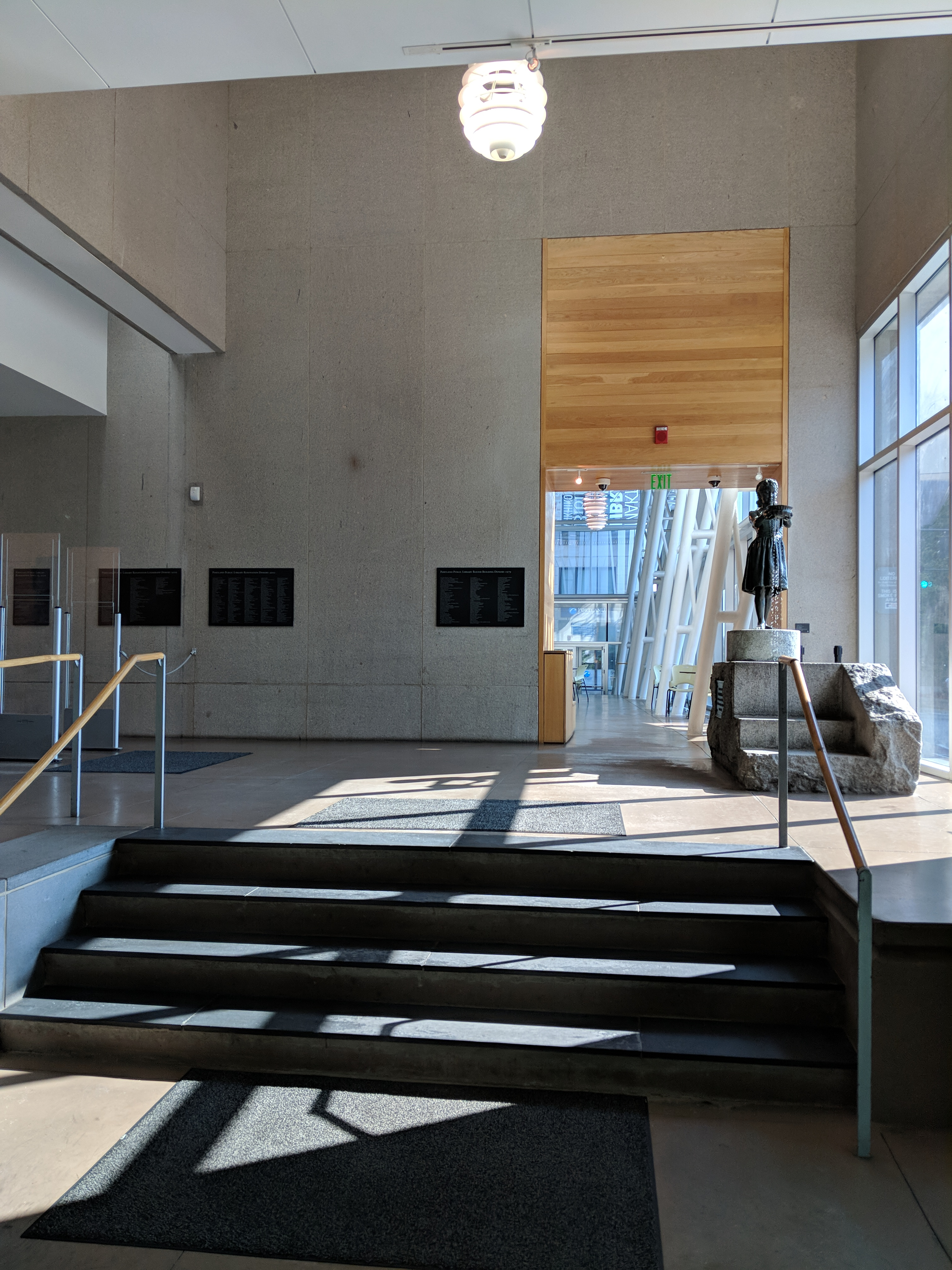
Portland Public's Entrance. Visitors are greeted by The Little Water Girl which has been at the Library since 1979.

Portland Public Library is the main library of the public library system in Portland, Maine, USA. It is located at 5 Monument Square on Congress Street in the Old Port of Portland, Maine. The library has three neighborhood branches, Burbank branch (in Deering), Peaks Island branch, and Riverton branch.

== History ==
=== Portland Athenaeum ===
The Portland Athenaeum (1826–1876) was a subscription library incorporated in Portland by a collection of local residents. As gratefully noted in a local newspaper in 1826:

Such an institution has long been a desideratum among us. Other towns inferior to this in size and wealth have gone before us in the career of literary enterprize ... and yet we are not willing to allow that there is any lack of literary elements in the town, but they lie scattered and dormant. There is no common centre of gravity to bring them into healthful action; they are like coals lying asunder which give no heat. We have scholars in town ... but their lights are hid under a bushel. ... We want an institution which shall bring them in contact, and give them the benefit of mutual light and heat, and action. ... [It] shall combine a reading-room, a library and cabinet. ... It is contemplated to unite, if practicable, the two reading-rooms now open in town, together with the Portland Library.

— Eastern Argus

Early supporters included Stephen Longfellow (father of Henry Wadsworth Longfellow), and William Willis. By 1856, the Athenaeum had "160 proprietors and ... a library, in the hall second story of the Canal Bank building [on Middle Street], of 8,500 volumes." James Merrill served as librarian, c. 1850.

In 1861, the Athenaeum erected a brick building on a lot previously purchased in Plum street. By 1864, the library contained 10,647 bound books, and additional pamphlets.

In 1866, the Great Fire swept through Portland, and the Athenaeum lost its collection in the flames.

=== Portland Institute and Public Library ===
Immediately following the fire in 1866, critic and writer John Neal proposed merging the Athenaeum with the libraries of the Mercantile Association, Maine Charitable Mechanic Association, and YMCA. The Portland Institute and Public Library formed in January 1867, with its library located in Portland City Hall. Willis served as the first president, and Neal the second. In 1876, the Athenaeum merged into the Portland Institute and Public Library; this bestowed the Atheneum's Plum Street property on the institute, although the library remained at City Hall.

In January 1889, the Portland Institute and Public Library was renamed as Portland Public Library, and became free for readers to access.

=== Portland Public Library ===
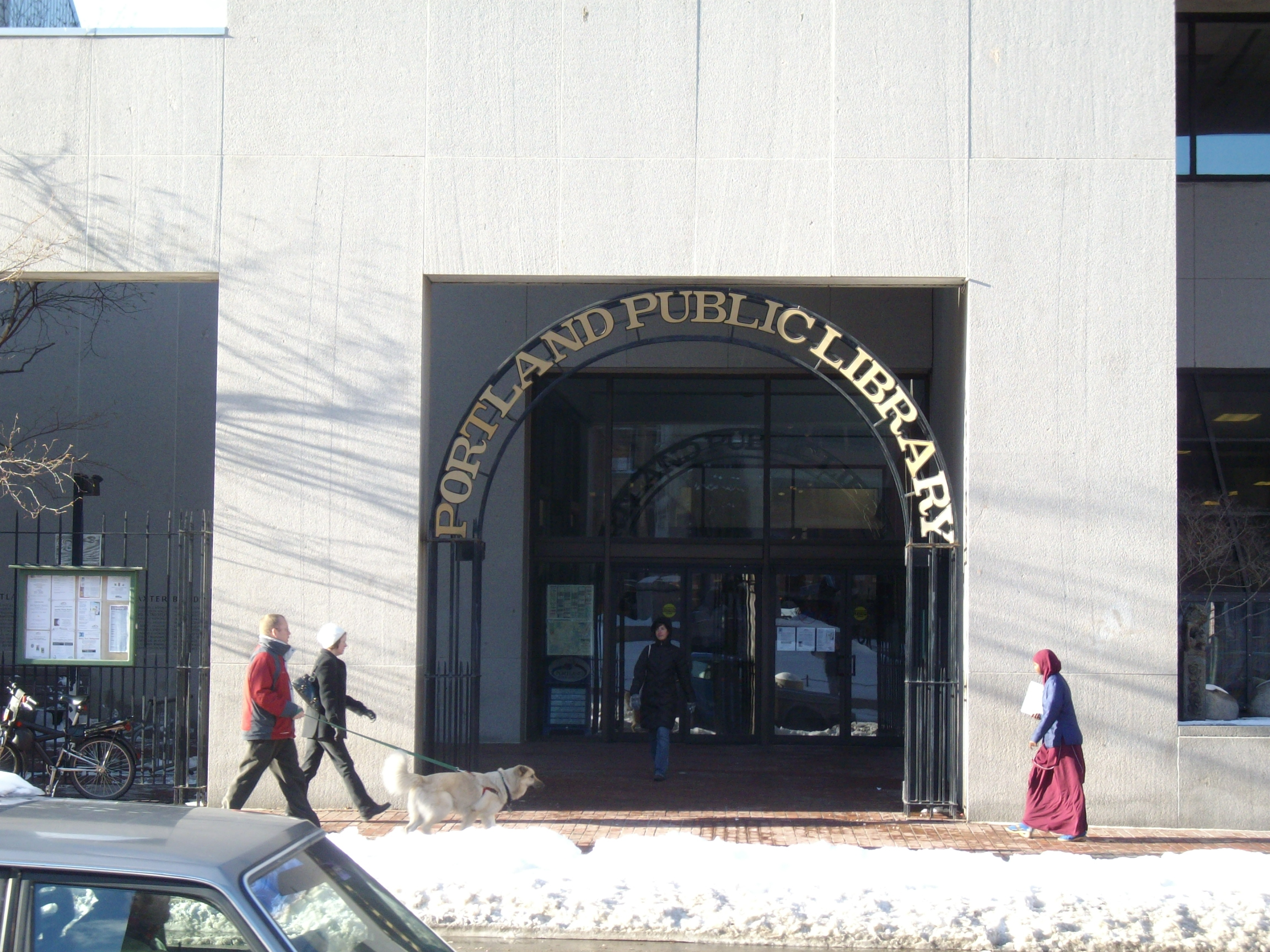
View of the Portland Public Library, 2008, from Monument Square before remodeling

In 1889, the library moved into what is now known as the Baxter Building, at 619 Congress Street.

The main library moved to Monument Square in 1979, into a new construction which replaced the three-story Clapp Block. A major renovation of the main building by Scott Simons Architects was completed in 2010.
