= Baxter Building (Portland, Maine) =

Historic building in Portland, Maine

Coordinates: 43°39′14″N 70°15′51″W

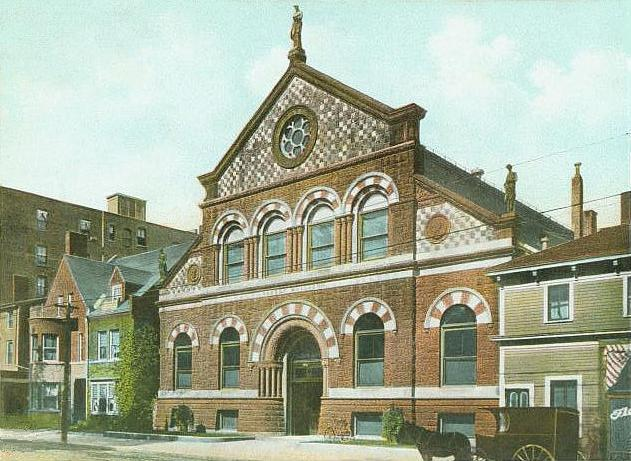
The Baxter Building circa 1905.

The Baxter Building is a historic building located at 619 Congress Street in downtown Portland, Maine. Completed in 1888, it served as the Portland Public Library from its founding until 1978, when the Library moved to another location on Congress Street. The building went unused from 1978 to 1983, when it was purchased by the Maine College of Art (MECA). MECA utilized the space for studio space, dark rooms, as a computer lab and library. In 2010, MECA sold the building to Northland Enterprises LLC, which then leased it to the VIA Group.

The building was designed by local architect Francis H. Fassett. It was built in the Romanesque Revival style which was prominent during the mid-19th century. It was updated in 1928 by Portland architect John Calvin Stevens. In February 2010, the building was renovated based on designs from local firms Scott Simons Architects and Archetype Architects, which was partially funded through a $272,000 tax break from the City Council as well as through federal historical tax credits.
