= Chase–Leavitt Building =

Commercial building in Portland, Maine

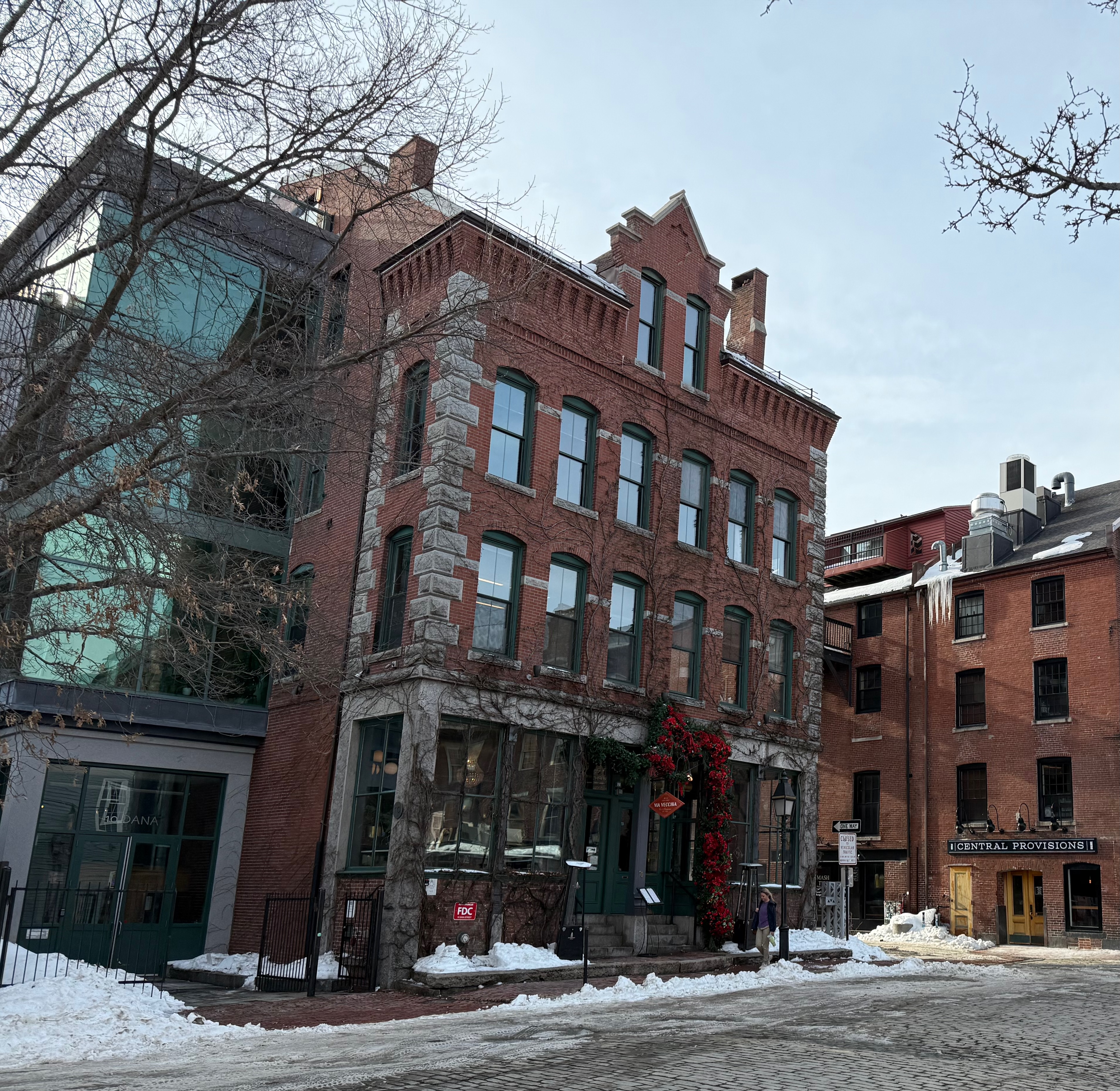
- The building in 2025
- Interactive map of the Chase–Leavitt Building area

General information
- Location: 10 Dana Street
- Coordinates: 43.655888°N 70.253708°W
- Completed: 1879 (147 years ago)

Technical details
- Floor count: 5 (including basement)
- Floor area: 12,345 square feet (1,146.9 m^{2})

Design and construction
- Architect: Francis H. Fassett

The Chase–Leavitt Building is a commercial building in the historic Old Port district of Portland, Maine, United States. It stands at 10 Dana Street at its southwestern corner with Wharf Street, a block inland from the city's working waterfront at Commercial Street.

Completed by James Phinney Baxter in 1879, to a design by noted Maine architect Francis H. Fassett, the four-storey building has been described as a "quintessential Old Port building." It is constructed of brick and granite, has a full basement and an exterior deck on the top floor.

== History ==
The building was first occupied by wholesale grocer Charles McLaughlin and Co.

Percival P. Baxter was the building's owner in 1924.

It was renovated in 2003, upgrading its electrical, plumbing and natural gas utilities. A glass-enclosed staircase, on the building's southern side, was added by Archetype Architects between 2018 and 2019, since it was deemed impossible to add an elevator to the building.

In 2021, the building was purchased by Ivy Holdings LLC for $3.6 million.

In the late 20th and early 21st century, the building was home to restaurant Vignola/Cinque Terre. As of 2025, it is another restaurant, Via Vecchia.
