= Maine flood of 1987 =

Natural disaster in the United States

The Maine flood of 1987 was a pair of spring storms in March and April 1987, which combined with snow-melt, resulted in heavy flooding in Maine, New Hampshire and Massachusetts.

== History ==
=== Preconditions ===
In the days before the first storm, weather throughout New England was mostly clear and dry. Except in higher-elevation areas, much of southern New England's snow-pack from December and January had disappeared.

However, snow-packs in Maine were just beginning to melt. A five to six-inch snow/water equivalent was not uncommon, with some measurements of ten inches recorded at the end of March.

A storm that had affected the midwest with heavy snow and winds spun off a slow moving low-pressure system that moved across New England. The southeasterly winds produced significant orographic lift in the mountains of Maine and New Hampshire, causing significant precipitation on the east side of these mountain ranges. The highest recorded rainfall accumulations were 8.30 inches at Pinkham Notch, New Hampshire and 7.3 inches at Blanchard, Maine.

=== Flood ===
The first storm mainly focused on Maine. The Kennebec River basin was most severely impacted with record flows on the mainstem and its primary tributaries—the Carrabassett River, Sandy River (Kennebec River), and Sebasticook River. The Piscataquis River experienced flows 50% greater than any measured before.

Many other rivers in Maine—Penobscot, Saco and Androscoggin—also experienced significant flooding; however, flows were generally below records. Moderate flooding occurred within the Merrimack River and Connecticut River basins.

== Results ==
Independent sources reported one and five deaths resulting from the flood.

Other damage included:

- 2,100 homes flooded; 215 destroyed, 240 with major damage
- 400 small businesses impacted
- Roads and bridges destroyed or damaged
- Fort Halifax (Maine) historic site in Winslow, Maine, washed away
- Losses estimated at over $100,000,000 (equivalent to about $277,000,000 in 2024)
