= Ambrose Abbott =

American politician

Ambrose H. Abbott

Member of the Maine Senate from the 7th district
- In office 1874–1874

Personal details
- Born: 1812/1813
- Died: 1882
- Profession: Grocer

Ambrose H. Abbott (1812/1813–1882) was an American politician from Augusta, Maine. He was a member of the Maine Legislature, serving in the Maine Senate in 1874. He represented the Seventh Senatorial District in the 1874 Senate session, which lasted from January 7 through March 4. He previously served in the Maine Governor's Council in 1870 and 1873. Besides serving in the legislature, he was a grocer.
