= Mount Pleasant House (New Hampshire) =

Coordinates: 44.2548°N 71.4516°W

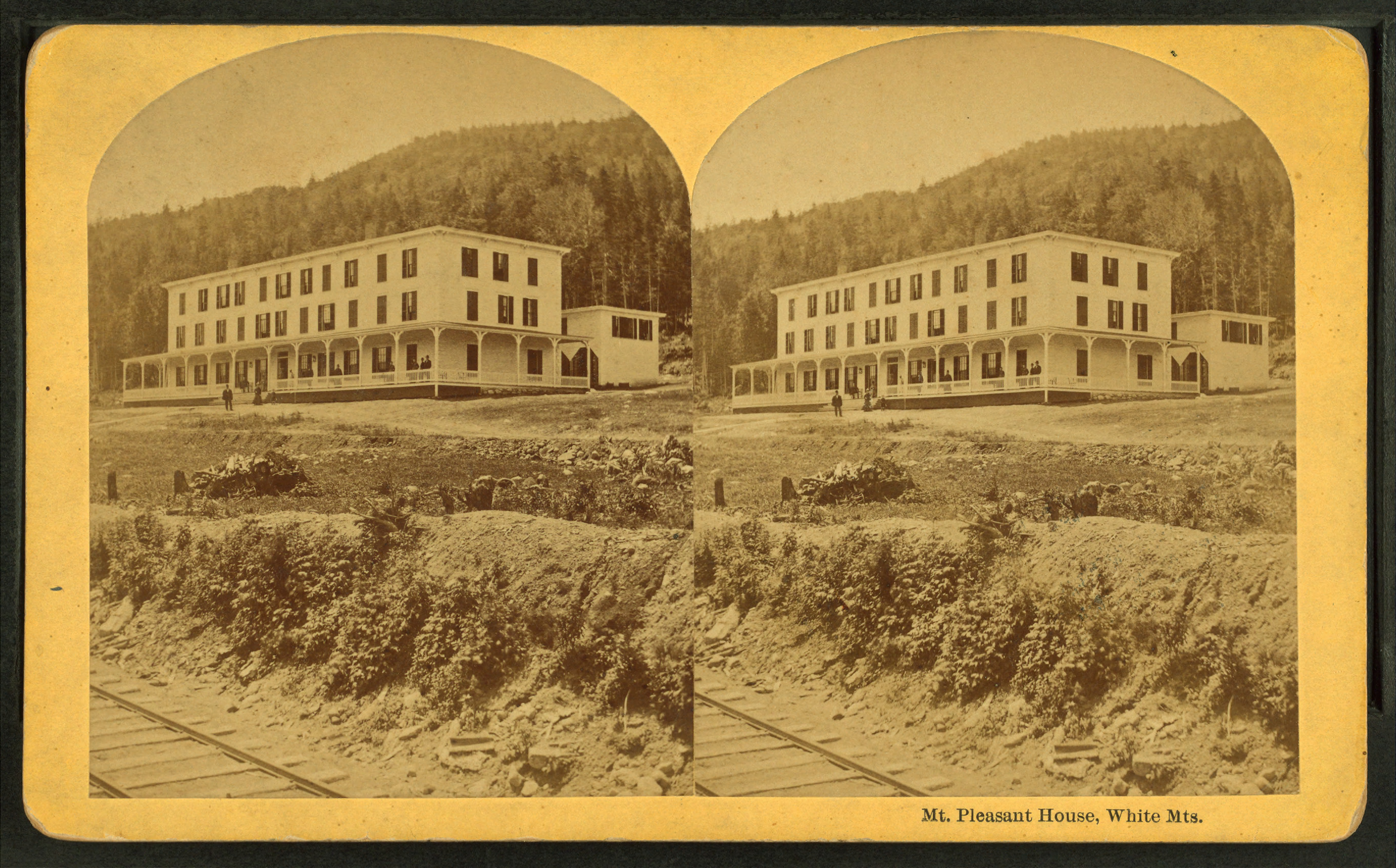
Stereoscopic image of Mount Pleasant House with railroad tracks showing in foreground

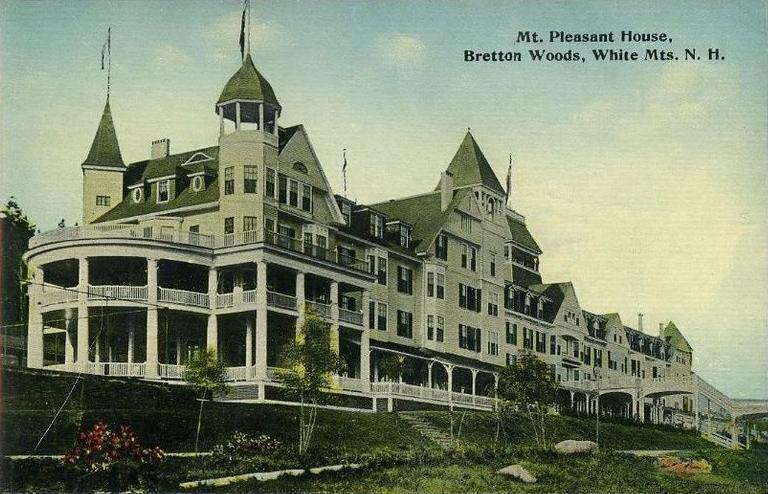
Mount Pleasant House postcard

Mount Pleasant House was a grand hotel in the White Mountains of New Hampshire, in the area of Bretton Woods. It was built in 1875 and opened in 1876. Mount Pleasant House was one of three grand hotels in the area at the time during the early stages of an era of epic hotel building and more came soon after. The other early grand hotels in Bretton Woods were White Mountain House and Fabyan House.

The original hotel was built by lumber businessman John T.G. Leavitt, and a lumber mill was located across from the hotel. The hotel and mill were served by a rail line. Portland, Maine, architect Francis H. Fassett orchestrated an expansion of the hotel in 1895. It featured Queen Anne style. The hotel was demolished in 1939.
