= Francis H. Fassett =

American architect (1823–1908)

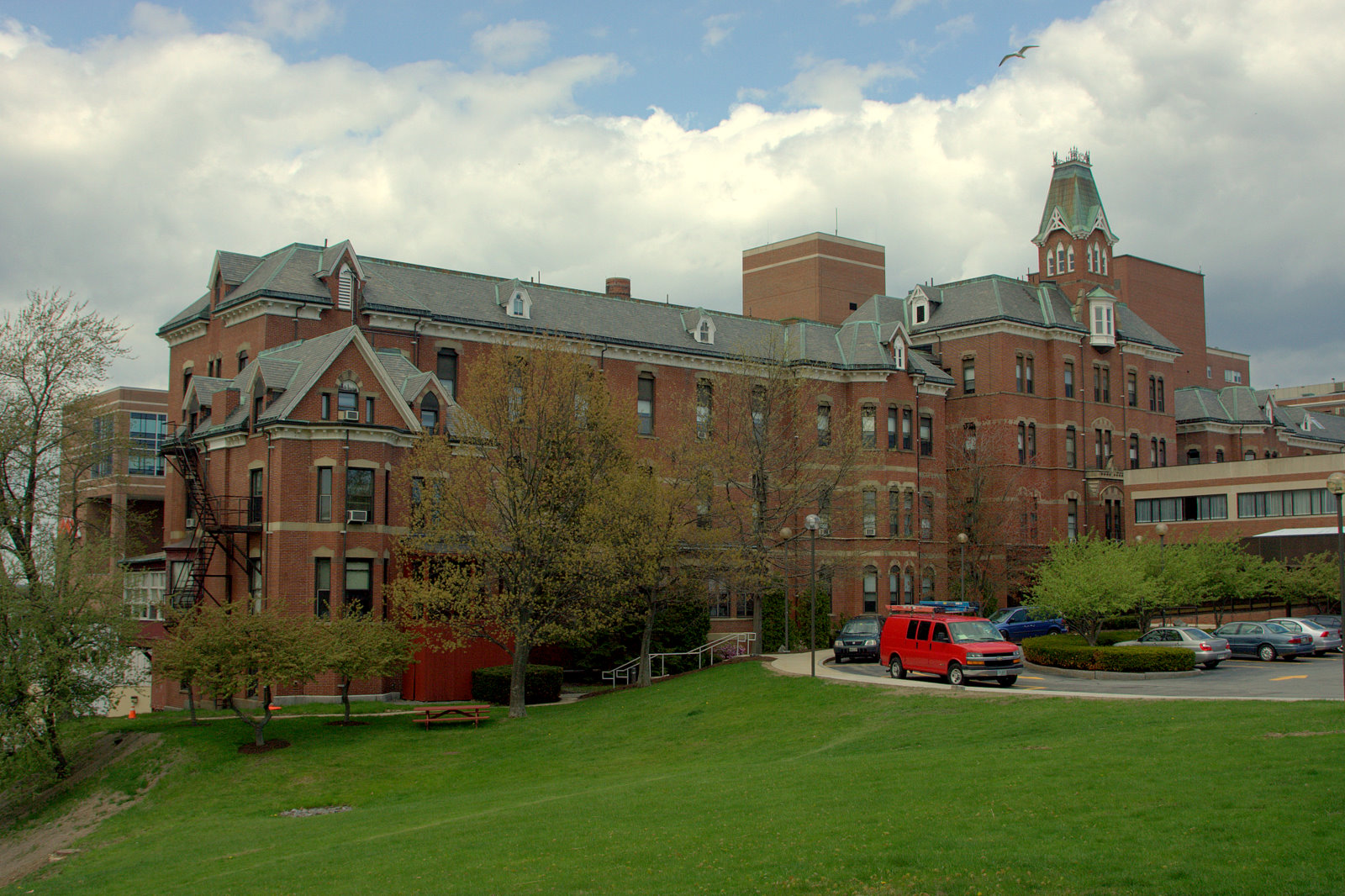
Maine General Hospital Building, built and expanded between 1871 and 1892, Portland

Francis Henry Fassett (June 25, 1823 – November 1, 1908) was an American architect in Maine who built as many as 400 homes and buildings throughout the state. Working in the Victorian High Gothic and Queen Anne styles, he especially influenced the look of Portland.

== Beginnings in Bath ==
Francis H. Fassett was born in Bath, Maine, the son of John Fassett and Betsey (Turner) Fassett. He was educated at the Old Erudition School until the age of fourteen, when he became a clerk in a general store. After four years, he was indentured to Isaac D. Cole, a leading carpenter and builder, to learn the trade. Serving his apprenticeship, Fassett then went into business for himself. He showed a natural aptitude for design, and from the beginning drew his own plans. When traveling, he learned a great deal about architecture from strolling through the cities he visited. After twenty years in Bath, he moved in 1864 to Portland, "...regarding that as presenting a wider field for his business."

== Portland ==
With a reputation for both ability and reliability, Fassett was well prepared for the rebuilding which following the Great Portland Fire of 1866. His designs for the city include the original Maine General Hospital Building, Alms House, Second Parish Church, the parish house for the Cathedral of St. Luke, and the former city hall, which burned in 1908 and was replaced by the present building. He also designed numerous residences, many in the fashionable West End. During the 1870s, Fassett was the leading architect in both the city and state.

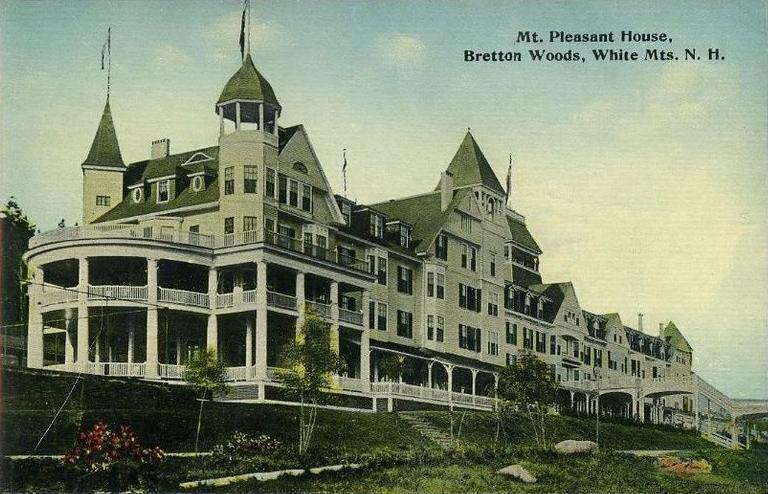
Mount Pleasant House c. 1912, Bretton Woods, New Hampshire

He married twice; first to Mima Ann Welch, who bore him four children, and then to Harriet Hudson. His son, Edward F. Fassett, became an architect and joined the firm. But his most notable apprentice was John Calvin Stevens, who was made partner and opened Fassett's Boston office in 1880, before opening his own Portland office in 1884. Fassett and his son designed the Pythian Opera House, built in 1894 at Boothbay Harbor. In 1895, Fassett redesigned the Mount Pleasant House, a hotel at Bretton Woods, New Hampshire in the White Mountains. Hired by Joseph Stickney, a coal mine and railroad stock tycoon who later built nearby Mount Washington Hotel, the architect enlarged the plain building into a Queen Anne style confection of cupolas, gables and porches. It was demolished in 1939.

== Death ==
Fassett died at the age of 85 and is buried at Evergreen Cemetery.

== Designs ==
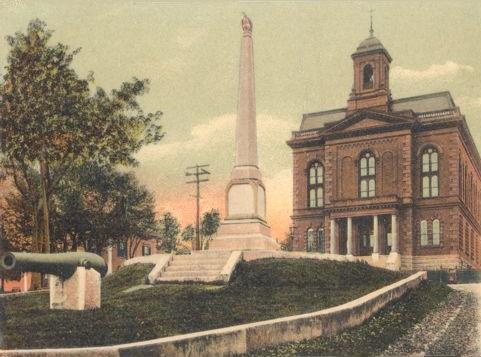
Sagadahoc County Courthouse (1869) in Bath

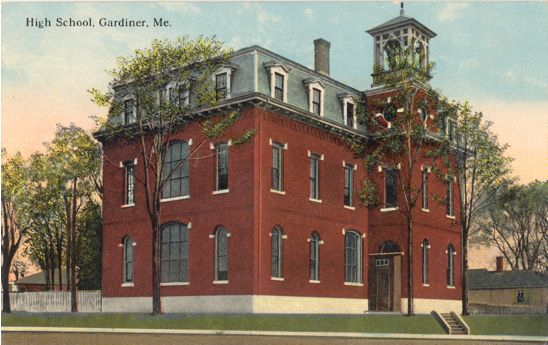
Gardiner High School (1870) in Gardiner

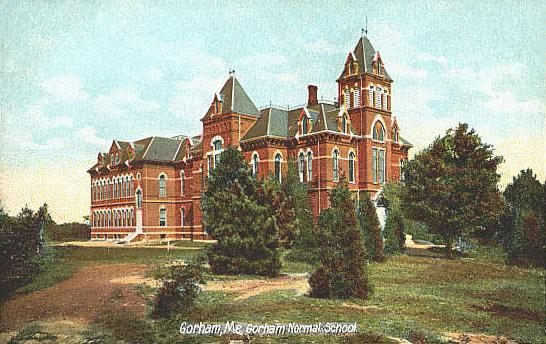
Gorham Normal School (1878), now Corthell Hall, at University of Southern Maine in Gorham

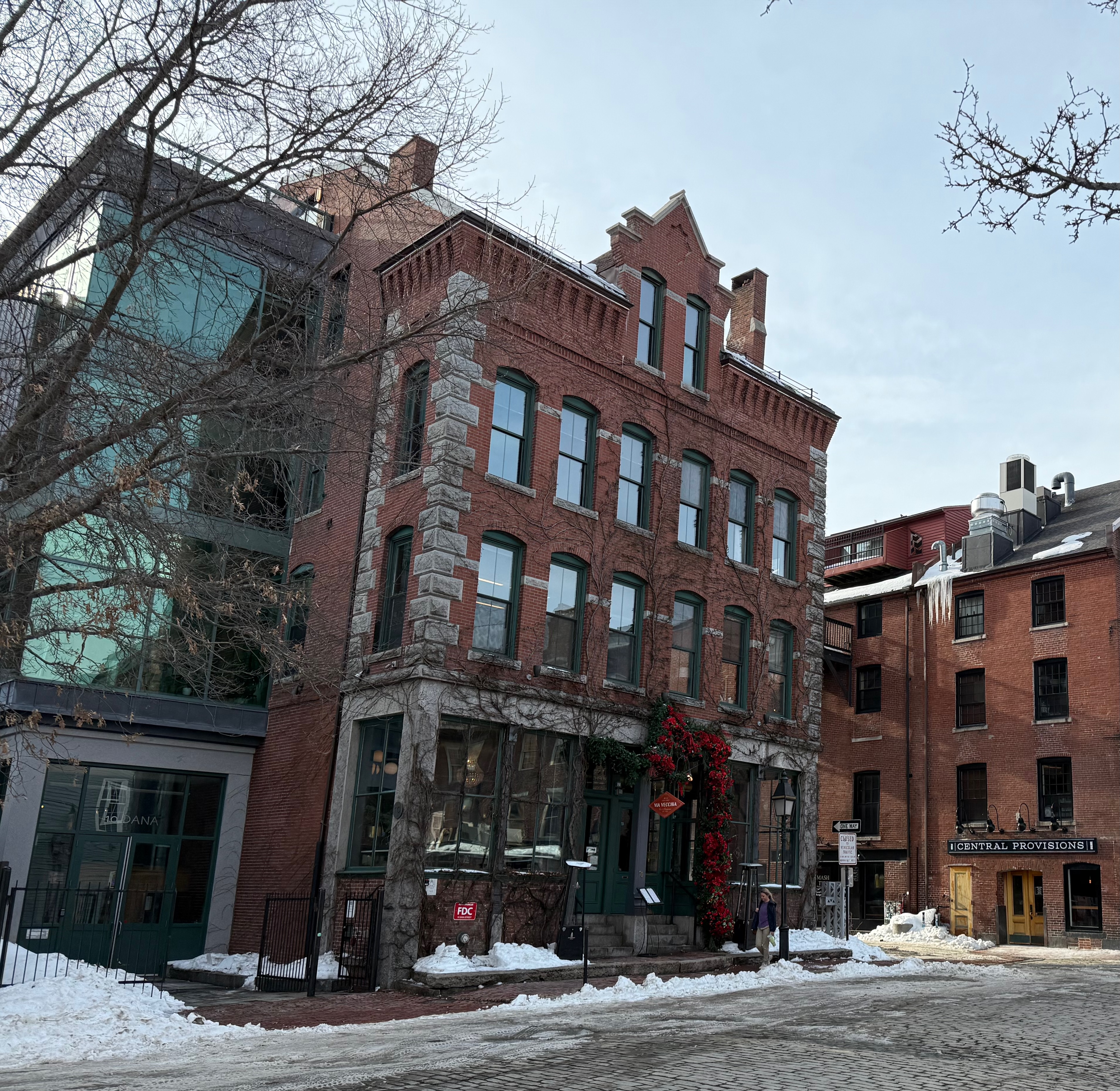
Chase–Leavitt Building (1879) in Portland

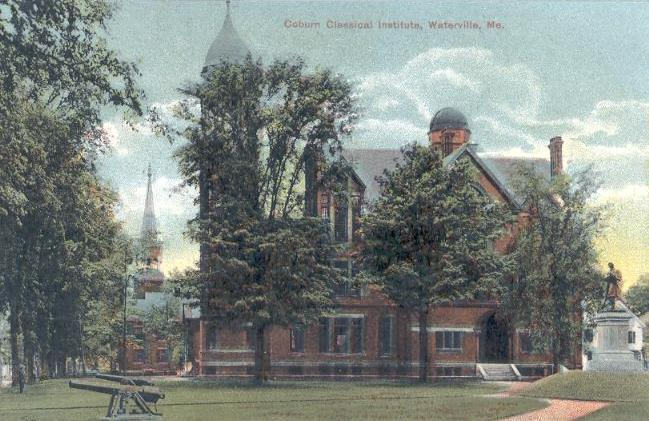
Coburn Classical Institute (1884) in Waterville, Maine

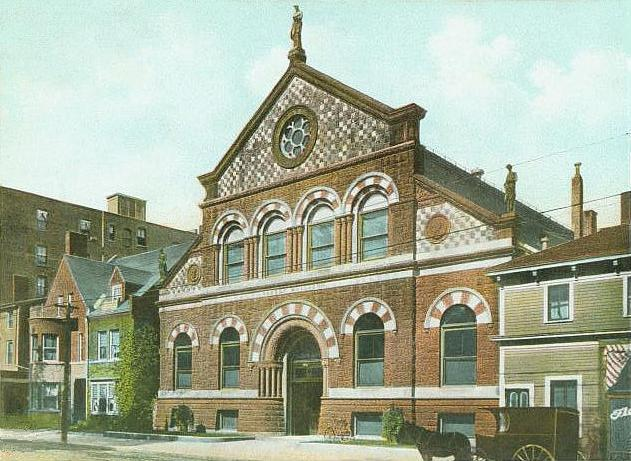
Baxter Library (1888) in Portland

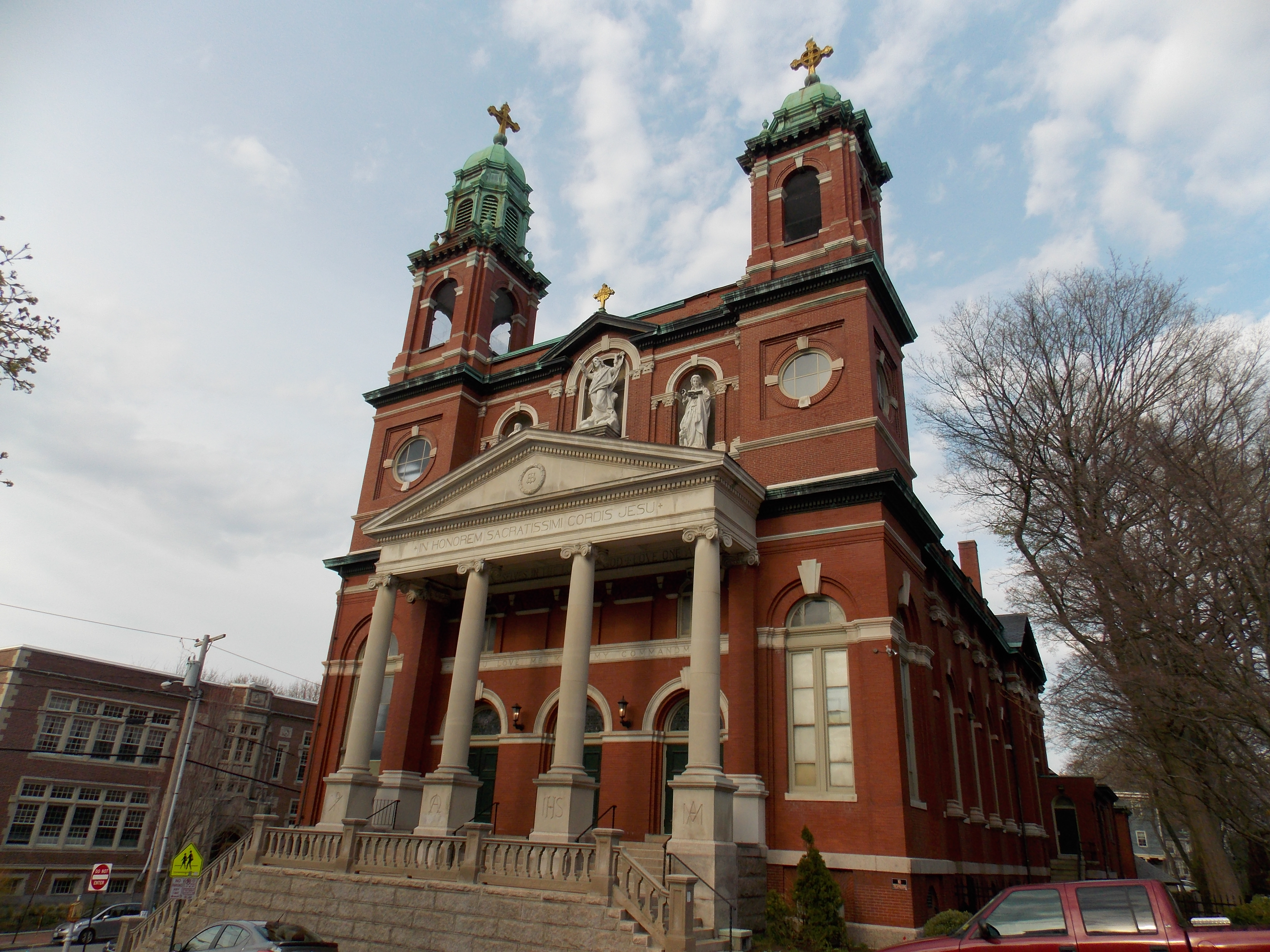
Sacred Heart Church in Portland
