= Galaxi =

Series of mass-produced roller coasters

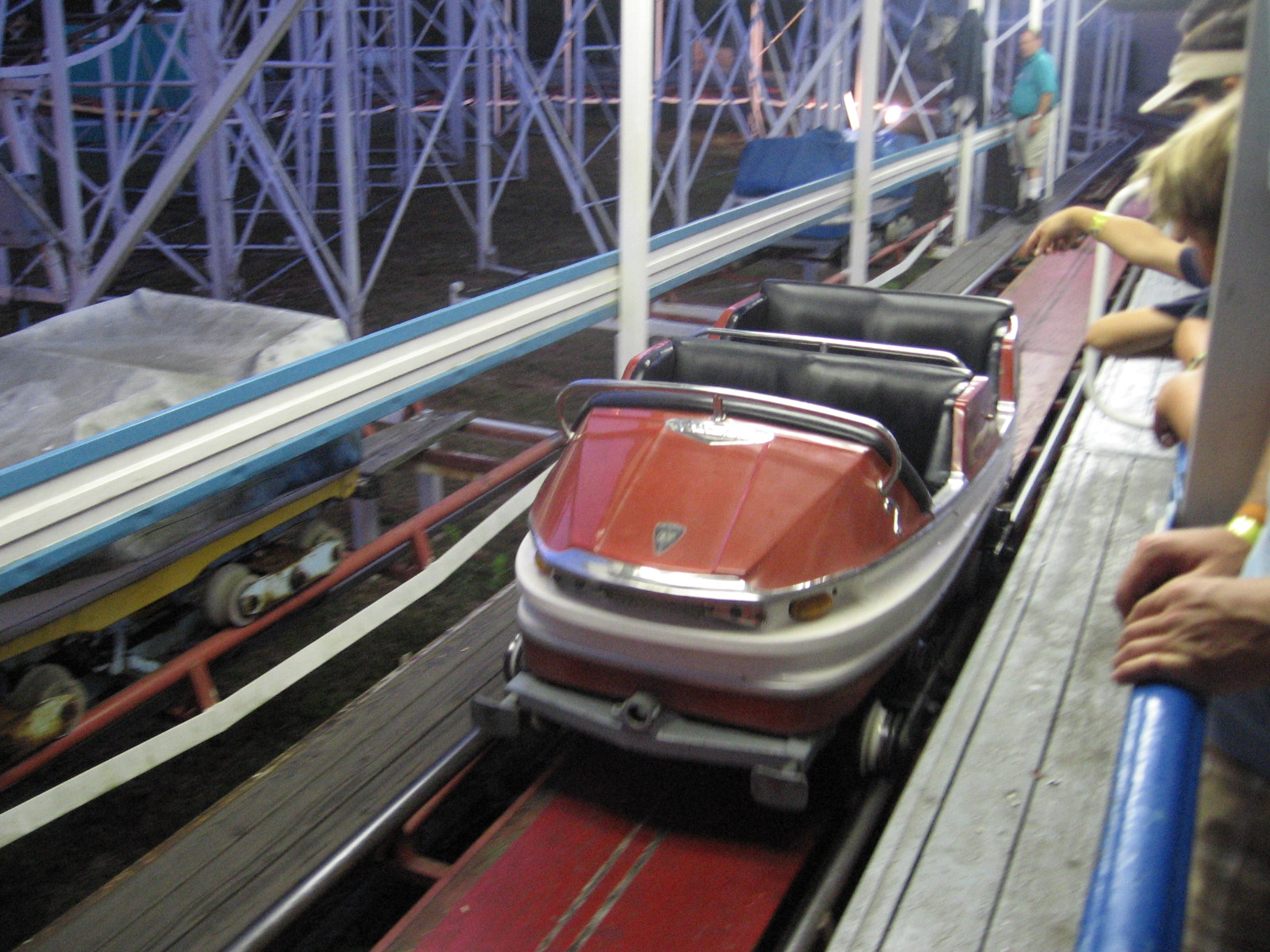
- A car from the now-defunct Galaxi at Funtown Splashtown USA
- Status: In production
- First manufactured: 1968
- No. of installations: 35
- Manufacturers: S.D.C.
- Vehicle type: train
- Vehicles: 2
- Rows: 2
- Riders per row: 2
- Restraint Style: Lap Bar
- Galaxi at RCDB

Galaxi (also Galaxy) is the common name of a series of mass-produced roller coasters manufactured primarily by Italian company S.D.C, which went bankrupt in 1993. The roller coaster design was first used in the 1970s, and as of 2009, sixteen Galaxi coasters are still in park-based operation, across the North American, European, and Australian continents, with another two "standing but not operating". At least 37 amusement parks are operating or have previously operated Galaxi coasters; this does not include those owned by funfairs and traveling ride companies.

== Layout ==
The Galaxi has a track length of 335 m (1,099 ft), with a ride time of 122 seconds and a maximum speed just over 50 km/h (31 mph). The track is steel. Trains consist of two four-seat cars, making 8 passengers per train. The ride is designed to be transportable, and disassembles onto seven trailers.

== In pop culture ==
In the season 4 CSI episode "Turn of the Screws", the subject of the main investigation is a Galaxi coaster. A sabotaged train with five passengers derailed and landed in a nearby parking lot, killing the riders and revealing the body of a park employee hidden in the trunk of a car. The Galaxi used for filming was Screaming Mummy at Pharaoh's Lost Kingdom.

== Appearances ==
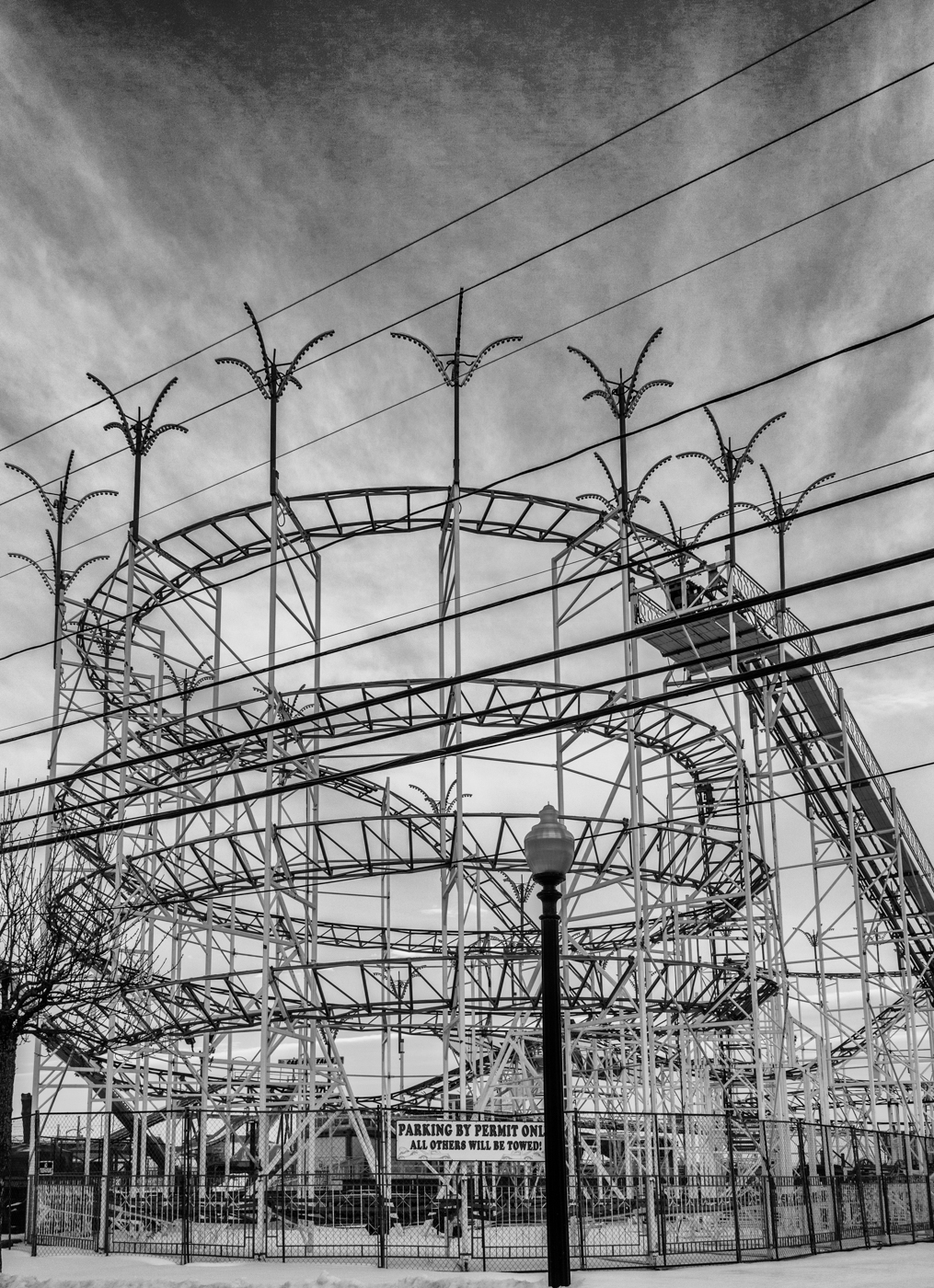
Galaxi at Palace Playland, Old Orchard Beach, Maine. (2017)

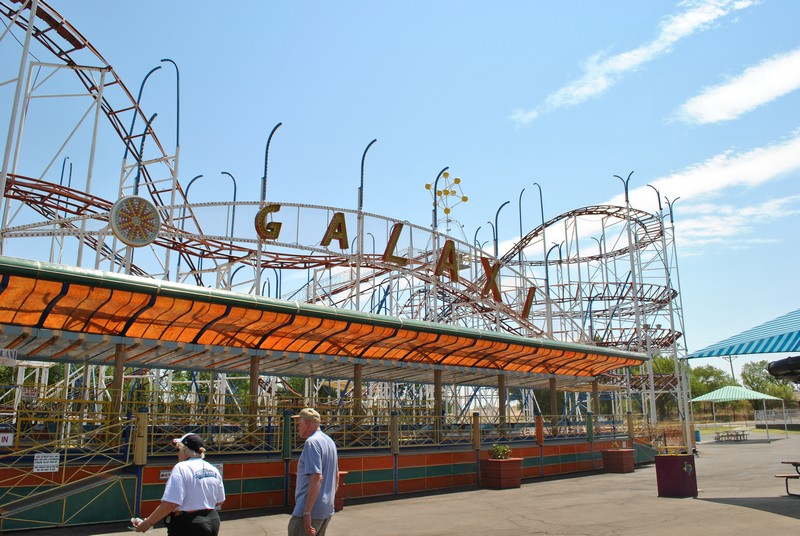
Galaxi at Joyland Amusement Park, Lubbock, Texas. (2011)

- Adventureland as "Super Screamer" in Altoona, IA (1976–1999)
- Adventureland as "Galaxy" in Farmingdale, NY (1973–1990)
- Queen's Park as "Cyclone" in Long Beach, CA (1969–1979)
- Fantasilandia as "Galaxy" in Santiago, Chile (1978–2013)
- Indiana Beach as "Galaxi" in Monticello, Indiana (1971–2013)
- Clarence Pier as "Skyways" in Portsmouth, Hampshire, UK. (1980–2018)
- Kings Island as Bavarian Beetle in Mason, OH (1972–1979)
- Sea World as Thrillseeker on the Gold Coast, Australia (1981–2002)
- Luna Park Melbourne as Metropolis (1990–2012).
- Canobie Lake Park as "Galaxi", later renamed "Rockin' Rider" in Salem, New Hampshire. (1970–2004)
- Europark as "Grand Huit" in Vias, Languedoc-Roussillon, France
- LeSourdsville Lake Amusement Park and Kokomos Family Fun Center as "The Serpent" in Middletown, Ohio (LeSourdsville) (1989–2002) and Saginaw, Michigan (Kokomos) (2009–2019). In storage Niagara Amusement Park & Splash World (2022–present)
- Palace Playland as "Galaxi" in Old Orchard Beach, Maine. (1994–2017). (Was located at Peony Park As "Galaxy Orbit" from (1972–1994)
- Miracle Strip at Pier Park as "1970 Galaxy Rip Tide Coaster" in Panama City Beach, Florida. (2014–2015)
- Blue Bayou and Dixie Landin' as Gilbeau's Galaxi in Baton Rouge, Louisiana (2001–present)
- Sylvan Beach Amusement Park as Galaxi in Sylvan Beach, New York (1994–Present)
- Joyland Amusement Park as "Galaxi" in Lubbock, Texas (1989–2022)
- Frontier City as "Nightmare Mine" in Oklahoma City, Oklahoma (1989–1999; another ride of the same name was added to the park in 1999 but closed in 2000)
- Cliff's Amusement Park as "Galaxi" in Albuquerque, New Mexico (1976–present)
- Kings Dominion as "Galaxi" in Doswell, Virginia (1975–1983)
- Hydro Adventures as "Galaxy 500" in Poplar Bluff, Missouri (2016–present)
- Daytona Beach Boardwalk as "Sandblaster" in Daytona Beach, Florida (2013–2018)
- Funtown Splashtown USA as "Galaxi" in Saco, Maine (1978–2009)
- White Swan Park as "Galaxi" in Allegheny County, Pennsylvania (unknown–1989)
- Myrtle Beach Pavilion as "Galaxi" in Myrtle Beach, South Carolina (1984–1997)
- Italo Americano Park as "Galaxy", in Caracas, Venezuela (unknown–2011)
- Footrot Flats Leisure Park as "Cannonball Run " in Auckland, New Zealand from 1985 to circa 1990. Now owned by Mahon Amusements but unsure if still operable.
- Parque de Atracciones de Zaragoza as "Moncayo" in Zaragoza, Spain (1974–present)
- Paragon Park as "Galaxi" in Hull, MA (1974–1984)
- Gençlik Parkı as "Galaxi" in Ankara, Turkey (unknown (before 1985)–present)
