= Rampage (roller coaster) =

Wooden twister ride in Bessemer, Alabama

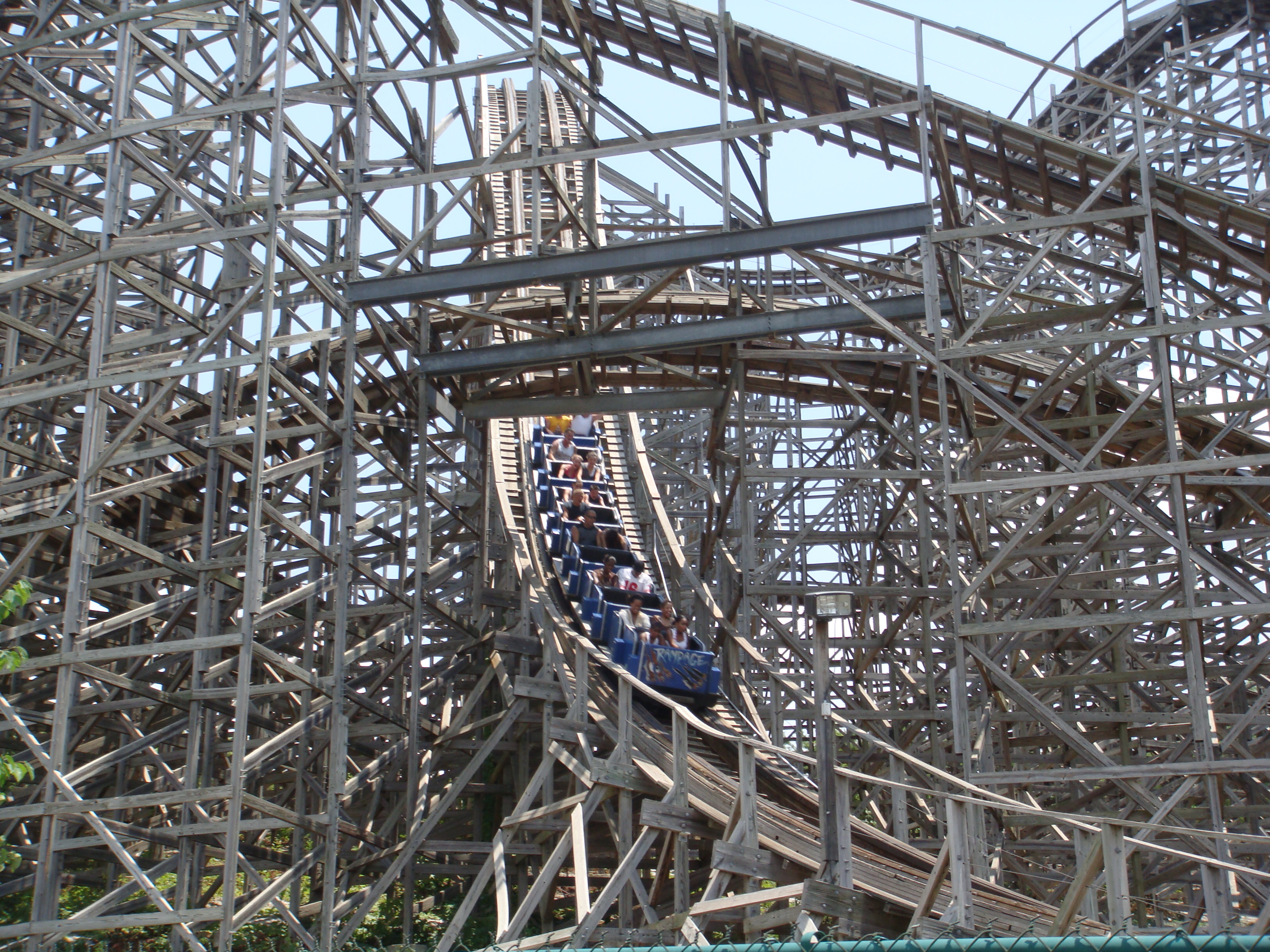
- A train descending the first drop

Alabama Splash Adventure
- Location: Alabama Splash Adventure
- Coordinates: 33.3792°N 86.9969°W
- Status: Operating
- Opening date: May 23, 1998
- Cost: $4,300,000

General statistics
- Type: Wood
- Manufacturer: Custom Coasters International
- Designer: Larry Bill
- Track layout: Twister
- Lift/launch system: Chain lift hill
- Height: 120 ft (37 m)
- Drop: 102 ft (31 m)
- Length: 3,500 ft (1,100 m)
- Speed: 56 mph (90 km/h)
- Duration: 1:30
- Restraint style: Lap bar
- Trains: 6 cars; riders arranged 2 across in 2 rows for a total of 24 riders per train
- Rampage at RCDB

Rampage is a wooden roller coaster located at Alabama Splash Adventure in Bessemer, Alabama, US. Manufactured and built by Custom Coasters International, with design from Larry Bill, the roller coaster originally opened with the Vision Land amusement park on May 23, 1998. Rampage operated until 2002, closing for the entire season due to the principal owners filing for bankruptcy. The roller coaster reopened on May 26, 2003, under the Southland Entertainment Group ownership, until its second closure in 2012 under General Attractions. Rampage sat dormant for four years, before being renovated in 2014 by owners Dan and Natalie Koch and reopening for the 2015 season.

The roller coaster reaches a maximum height of 120 feet (37 m), a maximum speed of 56 miles per hour (90 km/h), and a total track length of 3,500 feet (1,100 m). Constructed at the cost of $4.3 million, the design of Rampage was inspired by another CCI-built roller coaster, Megafobia, located at Oakwood Theme Park. Rampage features nine crossovers throughout its twister layout, with trains built by Philadelphia Toboggan Coasters. Upon its initial opening, the roller coaster received mostly positive reviews from critics and guests.

== History ==
Larry Langford, then-mayor of Fairfield, Alabama, presented the idea of building an amusement park near Birmingham, Alabama, in August 1995. During his announcement, Langford had the backing of around a dozen cities, making Vision Land the first supported project with inter-municipal cooperation. The park would incorporate several attractions within its opening year, including roller coasters. The Alabama Legislature approved of the park's construction in March 1996, with ground breaking for the park taking place in April. Plans for the roller coaster's construction were being arranged near the end of November, having an estimated cost of $5 million. The roller coaster was originally to be themed to the area's historical mining operations with the attraction based on a mine cart set loose and include a 100-foot (30-meter) drop.

A bond deal for the park's construction was finalized in March 1997. Langford revealed the roller coaster would be built from wood to capture the "'old-time clickety clack flavor of a Coney Island roller coaster'" and serve as the park's focal point attraction. Custom Coasters International (CCI) officials were present on the construction site in June to mark trees for preservation or demolition. CCI owner, Denise Larrick, disclosed the roller coaster would feature a length of 3,500 feet (1,100 meters), a maximum speed of 56 mph (90 km/h), in addition to several drops and turns. By September, concrete footings were being poured with some already in place, and the supporting structure for the station was in construction. Finalized engineering plans for the roller coaster were projected to be complete in October, in addition to vertical construction of the wooden supports to be completed during November. The roller coaster would celebrate its topping out ceremony on December 2 and construction was reported by the Birmingham Post-Herald to be "more than half done" during the first week of December.

Vision Land representatives held a "Name That Coaster contest" to choose a title for its roller coaster, the name "Rampage" selected as the winner on December 15, 1997, out of 1,400 entries. The Rampage moniker was submitted by a local Pleasant Grove High School student, with "Scorpion's Tail" and "Jaguar" coming in second and third place, respectively. Rampage's construction was completed on March 22, 1998, with initial testing rehearsals conducted on March 24, using bagged oats acting as test dummies. The last checks on the roller coaster's track were conducted in early April. A preview was held on May 16, and opened coinciding with the opening of Vision Land on May 23. Rampage was one of seven wooden roller coasters to open in the United States during the 1998 season.

=== Operation ===
After an initial successful financial year, the park observed stagnant attendance into 2000. The resulting insufficient attendance, operational decisions, and debt led the park to file for Chapter 9 bankruptcy on June 4, 2002. The filing allowed the park to open its water park attractions, but left Rampage closed among other attractions through the 2002 season. After several amusement groups looked at buying the park and participants of the inter-municipal cooperation backed out, the park was sold to Team Pro Parks, a California-based venture. The venture, operating under Southland Entertainment Group, refurbished the idle Rampage roller coaster for its reopening season. Rampage was renovated by John Hinde Enterprises and opened on May 26, 2003, in the Magic Adventure (later named as Alabama Adventure) portion of Vision Land.

Vision Land was sold to General Attractions in January 2012. The new ownership announced the park that included Rampage would close indefinitely, with the water park portion to open in the newly named "Splash Adventure" in April 2012. The roller coaster was planned to be sold to fund future water park developments. Rampage sat dormant until the park was bought by the Dan and Natalie Koch, formerly of Holiday World, on March 13, 2014. The Kochs' planned to renovate the roller coaster to open with the park in the 2015 season. Over the period of six months, the Rampage was refurbished at the cost of $1 million. The project included restoring the entire wooden track and partial sections of wooden supports, in addition to a new train set. The renovation also included a new lift chain and control system. A preview was held for an American Coaster Enthusiasts (ACE) event on October 25. The ride re-opened to the public in 2015, with the Alabama Splash Adventure park.

On February 28, 2024, Alabama Adventure announced that Rampage would not operate for the 2024 season so that the park could begin re-tracking the ride, citing annual maintenance costs that had exceeded $500,000 to keep the wooden roller coaster operational. The park initially stated that the work would convert sections of the wooden track to steel, with the ride expected to reopen in 2025. Rampage was expected to reopen in the summer of 2026 following a traditional wooden re-track, initially focusing on roughly 200 feet (61 meters) of track at the base of the first drop. Rampage officially reopened to guests on June 19, 2026, with a ribbon-cutting ceremony at the park.

== Ride experience ==
After leaving the station, the train dips to the right before ascending the 120-foot (37 m) chain lift hill. Cresting the lift hill, the train enters a left turn pre-drop before descending the 52-degree, 102-foot (31 m) drop. At the bottom of the drop, the train banks slightly left and completes a camelback hill before ascending into a left-banked hill. Continuing the turn, the train dips, before flattening into a drop where the train completes a hill, then rises to the right into a continuous right banked turn. Continuing the turn, the train dips, slightly ascends, then exits into a drop where it completes another hill. The train ascends a right-banked turn, completes a hill, then ascends into a left-banked series of dips. The train drops and banks right before going upwards into the final brake run. The train makes a slight left, before dropping to the right into one final hill before descending into the station. One cycle of the roller coaster takes about a minute and thirty seconds to complete.

== Characteristics ==
A wide view of Rampage

Rampage was manufactured and built by Custom Coasters International, the 23rd project by the company, and designed by Larry Bill. Rampage was built with around 1,200 concrete footers and 650,000 board feet (1,500 m^{3}) of lumber assembled with southern yellow pine. The roller coaster has a total track length of 3,500 feet (1,100 m). Rampage's layout is largely based on Megafobia at Oakwood Theme Park in Pembrokeshire, United Kingdom, which was also built by CCI. Park officials chose the wooden roller coaster type for Rampage because of its older-style and cost; which was built for US$4.3 million dollars.

Rampage is considered a twister roller coaster because the track's layout weaves through itself. The roller coaster features 9 crossovers and 12 curves. The roller coaster reaches a top speed of 56 miles per hour (90 km/h). When it opened, the roller coaster operated with two Philadelphia Toboggan Coasters (PTC) trains. Each train had six cars that contain two rows of two seats, allowing a maximum capacity of 24 people. Each set contains a lap bar restraint system as well as a seat belt.

== Reception ==
Upon its initial opening, Rampage received generally positive reviews from critics. Steve Joynt, writing for the Birmingham Post-Herald, commented that Rampage was "the undisputed star of the show" out of Vision Land's opening attractions, and favorably commented on the initial drop. Joynt further commented on the roller coaster's fast pacing, head chopper moments, and resonance of the overall ride experience as "the cars truly roar down the hills". Writing for The Anniston Star, Jeff Amy described Rampage as having "delivered on the promise" of enjoyment foretold by the roller coaster's operator, delivering "an adrenaline-induced tingle". Amy remarked that although Rampage was a "fine coaster", it could not compare to the roller coaster lineup at theme park chains such as Six Flags.

Rampage also received generally favorable reviews from amusement industry personnel and critics. Staff of The Birmingham News recorded an ACE member's reaction to Rampage, who stated the roller coaster had promising air time, speed, and height. Then-ACE president, Jan Kiser, was quoted by Joynt as having ascertained positive reviews about Rampage from members because of the roller coaster's defining features. Tim O'Brien of the amusement park trade magazine, Amusement Business, inducted Rampage as his 3rd best wooden coaster and the 5th best overall coaster; citing the roller coaster's hills, drops, and location as factors in his placement.

=== Awards ===
Golden Ticket Awards: Top wood Roller Coasters
Year									1998	1999
Ranking									17	3
Year	2000	2001	2002	2003	2004	2005	2006	2007	2008	2009
Ranking	4	7	10	15	13	17	15	27	20 (tie)	28
Year	2010	2011	2012	2013	2014	2015	2016	2017	2018	2019
Ranking	33	32	–	–	–	28	37	21	30 (tie)	34
Year	2020	2021	2022	2023	2024	2025	2026			
Ranking	N/A	33	36	–	–	–	49			

== See also ==
- 2011 in amusement parks
- Excalibur (Funtown Splashtown USA), another CCI-built wooden roller coaster
- Shivering Timbers, another CCI-built wooden roller coaster
