= Factory Island =

Island in Maine, United States

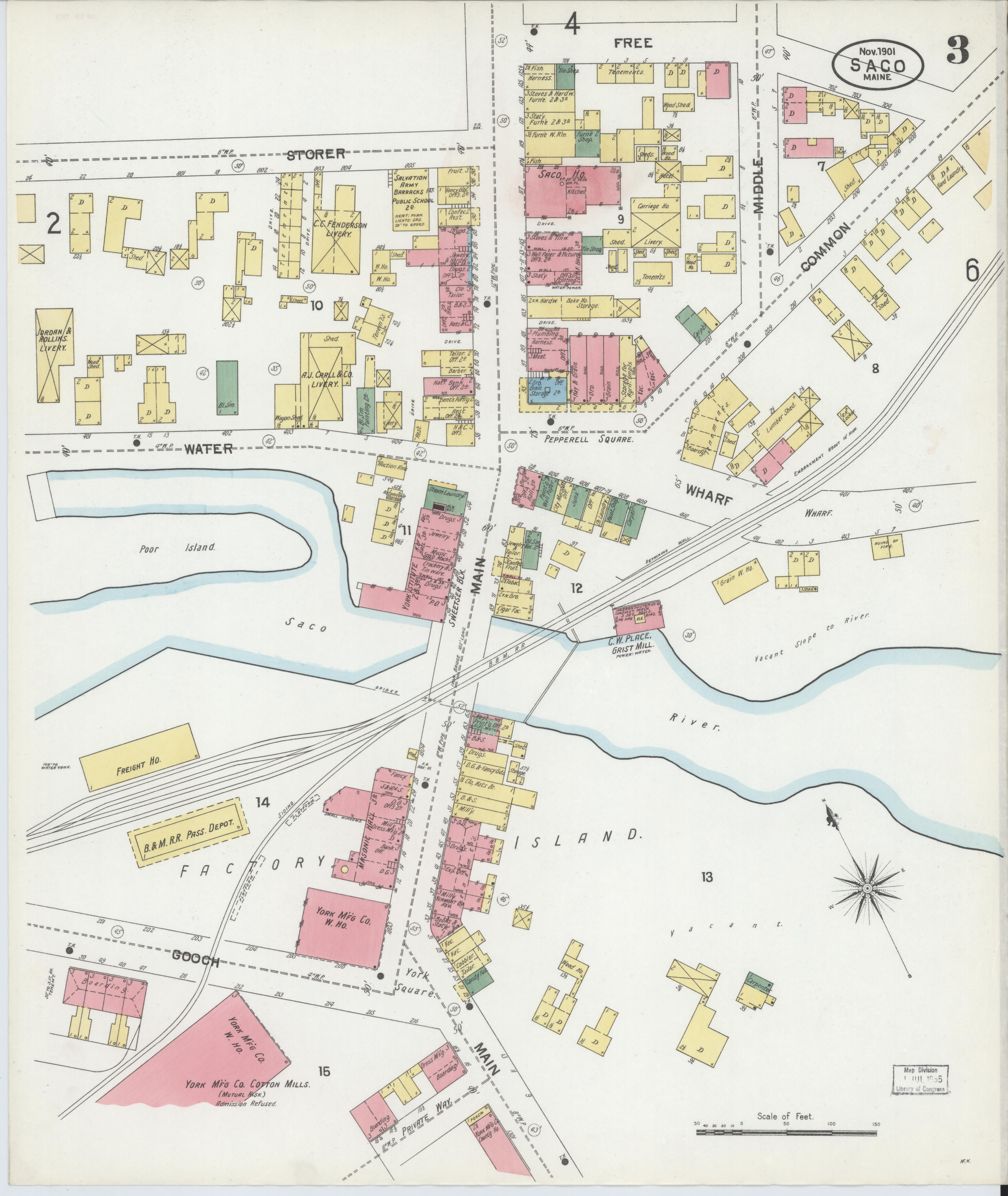
- The northern part of the island is in view on this 1901 Sanborn Fire Insurance map
- Other names: Saco Island

Geography
- Location: Saco River
- Coordinates: 43.495321°N 70.448965°W

Factory Island, also known as Saco Island, is a river island in Saco, Maine, United States. It lies in the Saco River, around 4 miles (6.4 km) northwest of its mouth at Saco Bay. The island, part of Biddeford–Saco Mills Historic District, separates downtown Saco to the north from Biddeford to the south. Main Street, which bisects the island connects the two cities.

Mill No. 3, of the former York Manufacturing Company and dating to the 1830s, is occupied by a restaurant and apartments today.

Saco Transportation Center is located in the northern part of the island. The railroad tracks, which carry Amtrak's Downeaster to and from Boston daily, cross the northern tip of the island as it crosses the Saco River on both the eastern and western sides of the island. The Transportation Center is also a hub for Biddeford Saco Old Orchard Beach Transit.
