= Palace Playland =

Amusement park in Maine

- Interactive map of Palace Playland
- Location: Old Orchard Beach, Maine, U.S.
- Coordinates: 43.5147°N 70.3747°W
- Status: Operating
- Opened: 1902
- Owner: John Golder; Paul Golder
- Slogan: New England's Only Beachfront Amusement Park

Attractions
- Total: 29
- Roller coasters: 3
- Water rides: 0
- Website: https://www.palaceplayland.com/

Palace Playland is a seasonal amusement park located in Old Orchard Beach, Maine. It has operated on the same site since 1902.

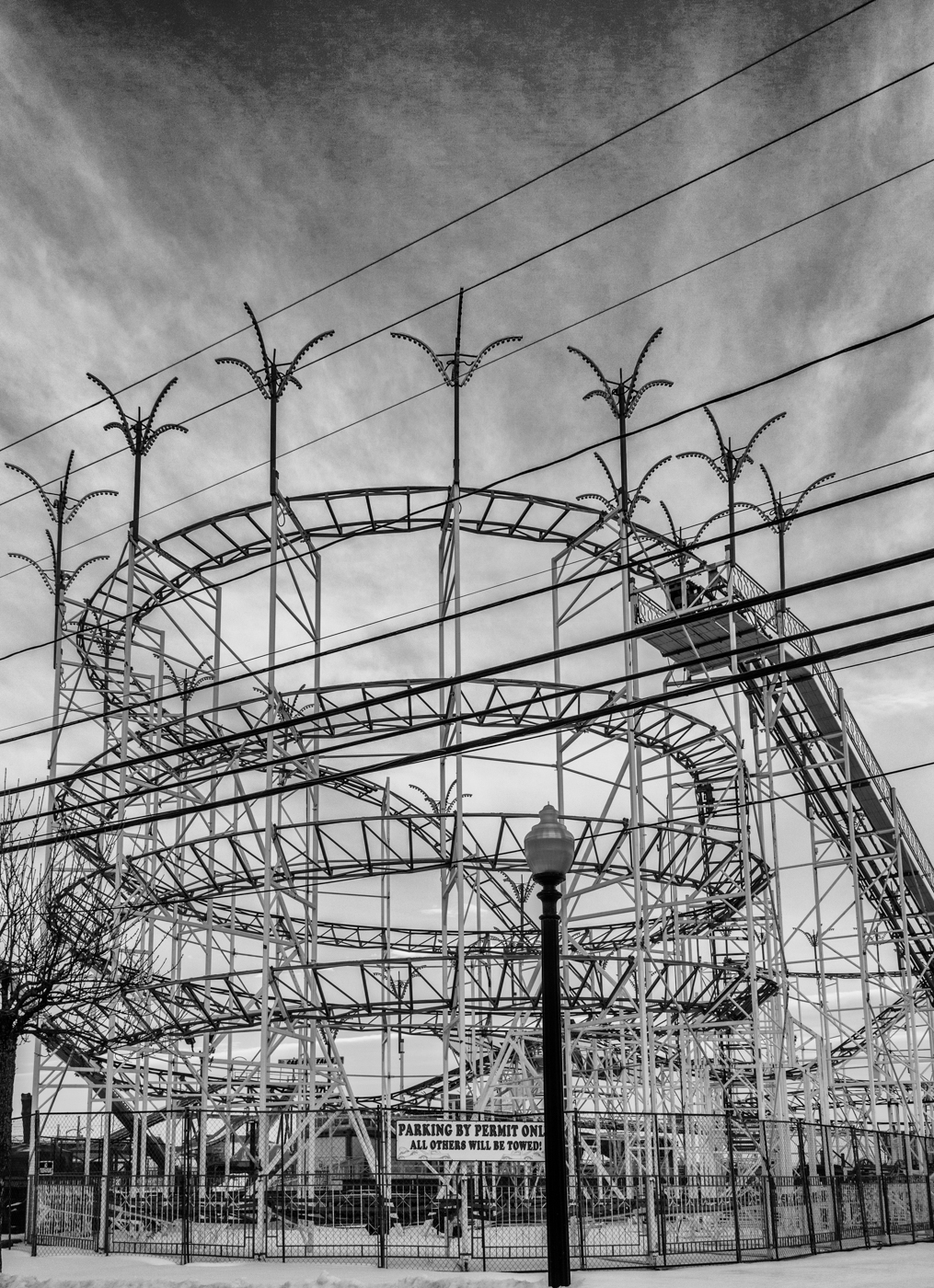
Former Galaxi roller coaster at Palace Playland (2017)

== History ==
In the 1900s, Palace Playland's startup decade, the then-small amusement park centered on a roller skating rink and adjacent merry-go-round. Simple summer refreshments were served, such as lemonade and salt water taffy.

In the 1950s, Palace Playland was operated by future banker and philanthropist Bernard Osher, a Maine native.

In the 1970s and 1980s, Palace Playland was noted for operating a 1910 Philadelphia Toboggan Company carousel, PTC #19; however, in 1996, the valuable antique was withdrawn from service and moved to Ohio.

In the 1990s, Palace Playland claimed to be "New England's largest pinball and video arcade." A guidebook writer recommended the park to "aficionados of the garish."

== Today ==
In the 2010s, Palace Playland described itself as "New England's Only Beachfront Amusement Park." In 2010–11, the park tore down and replaced its Ferris wheel. The Playland has positioned itself as a provider of amusement-park-experience services to French-speaking residents of Quebec, including offering a webpage in French. In 2018, Palace Playland opened another new roller coaster known as the "Sea Viper" replacing the "Galaxi". In April 2020, Palace Playland implemented a cashless card system for its arcade.

Palace Playland is located directly on the waterfront, across Maine State Route 9 from the Old Orchard Beach station.

== Rides ==
Roller Coasters
Name	Opened	Manufacturer	Notes
Sea Viper	2018	Preston & Babieri	Users board a cart resembling a sea snake. Then, passengers whip around sharp turns and steep gradients at high speeds. Replaced the former Galaxi coaster and partially sits on a 1-acre expansion
Wipeout	2018	SBF Visa Group	Added alongside Sea Viper part of a $4 million expansion.

Thrill Rides
Name	RideType	Notes	Year Added
HyperJump	Techno Jump	This ride was manufactured by Preston & Barbieri.	2023
Kraken	Pendulum	Technical Park Street Fighter Revolution. Replaced Adrenalin	2024
Matterhorn	Matterhorn	MACK Rides	
Nitro Speed	Spinner (Breakdance)	Manufacturer: Kolmax-plus. Replaced Orient Express	2025
Pirate	Pirate Ship	Manufacturer: HUSS. Retrofitted by: Amusement Technical	2005
Riptide		Replaced Moby Dick	2012
Wind Surfer	Cliffhanger	Replaced Cliffhanger	2025

Family Rides
Name	Ride Type	Notes	Year Added
Dodgem	Bumper Cars		
Drop Zone	Drop Tower		2007
Electra Wheel	Ferris Wheel	Replaced the parks former Sun Wheel (Ferris Wheel)	2011
Gold Rush	Roller Coaster	Manufactured by Zamperla.	2026
Super Star	Troika	Manufacturer: HUSS	1979
Tilt-A-Whirl	Tilt-A-Whirl		
Wave Swinger	Wave Swinger		2008

Kiddy Rides
Name	Ride Type	Notes	Year Added
Carousel	Carousel	Chance Rides Menagerie Carousel	
Convoy			
Crop Duster			2008
Dizzy Dragons		Similar to Tea Cups, riders enter a dragon's stomach and can spin their dragon either direction.	2012
Dumbo			
Euro Slide	Fun Slide		2005
Frog Hopper			2001
Grand Orient Fun House	Fun House	Relocated from the Galaxi side of the Park to near the Ferris Wheel in the early 2000s	
Hampton Cars			
Hampton Motorcycles			
Motorcycle Jump			2005
Samba Balloon			2025
Tea Cups	Kiddie Tea Cups		2002
Winky The Whale			

Notable Former Attractions
Name	Ride Type	Notes	Year Removed
Liquid Lightning Water Slides	Water Slides	It was originally called "Tallest Water Slides in Maine" when it first opened.	2002
Terminator	Kamikaze		2008
Galaxi	Roller Coaster	Replaced by Sea Viper	2017
Fiesta Loca	Octopus		2018
Cascade Falls	Log Flume		2021
Orient Express	Roller Coaster	Replaced by Nitro Speed	2024

== See also ==
- Euclid Beach Park - discussion of history of PTC #19
- Funtown Splashtown USA - amusement park in Saco, Maine
