= Joyland Amusement Park =

Amusement park in Lubbock, Texas, United States

- Type: Private
- Industry: Amusement Park
- Founded: 1940s (as Mackenzie Park Playground)
- Defunct: January 10, 2023
- Headquarters: 500 Canyon Lake Drive, Lubbock, Texas United States
- Key people: David Dean, CEO
- Website: joylandpark.com

Joyland Amusement Park was a small family-owned traditional amusement park, located in Lubbock, Texas, United States within Lubbock's Mackenzie Park. It typically operated from March to September of each year, opening six days a week but only during the evening on weeknights.

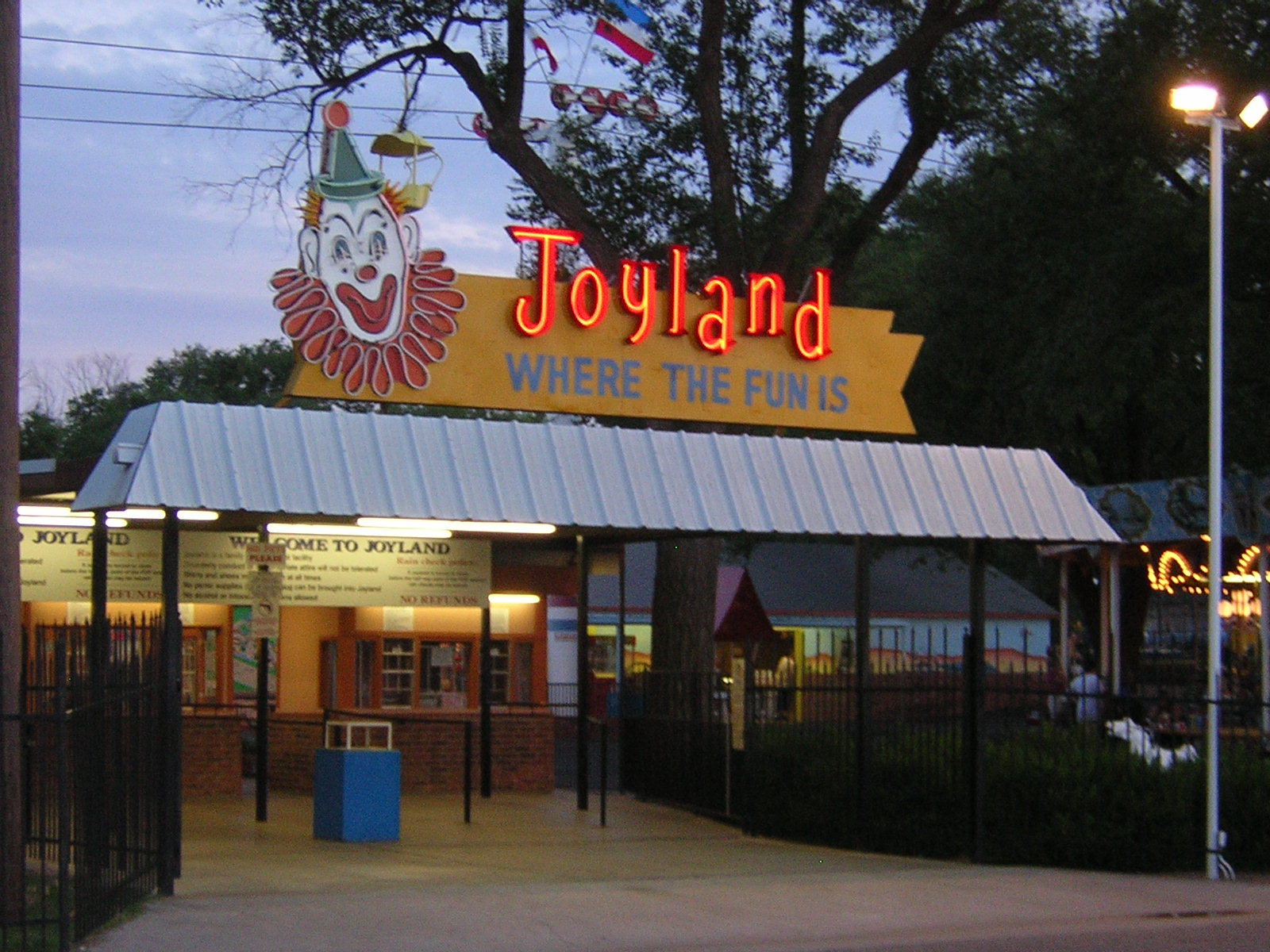
Entrance to park

== History ==
The park was founded in the 1940s with the name "Mackenzie Park Playground." In 1973, it had 13 rides and was acquired by the Dean family, who renamed the park to its current name. Like many smaller parks it used a mixture of individual ride admissions and pay one price admission, with patrons taking their choice.

On September 12, 2022, the Dean family announced that Joyland would not reopen and that the park would be auctioned on October 27, 2022, if an interested party with a viable offer was not found by October 1. On October 21, it was announced that buyers Jim and Kai Evans along with Daryl and Stephanie Holland would reopen the park for the 2023 season. The park would not reopen in 2023 following an announcement on January 10, 2023, that buyers backed out of the purchase, and liquidation of the park would begin soon.

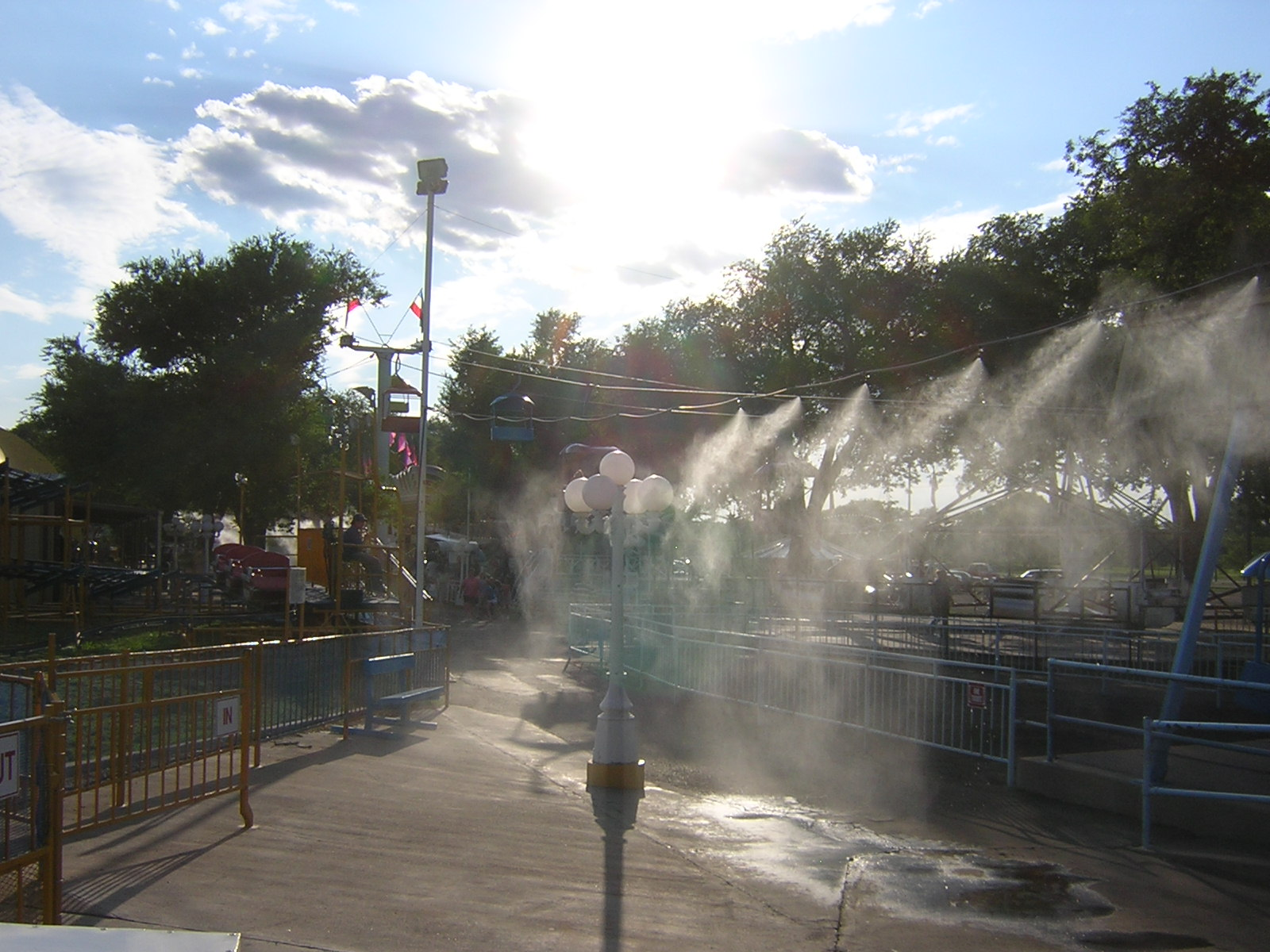
Misty Midway

== Layout and operation ==
The park was laid out linearly with a midway. Much of the midway had water sprayers overhead to mist guests, which increased guest comfort in Lubbock's hot, dry climate. There were several water rides, roller coasters and family rides.

There was a park train that runs from one end to the other, with a station near the kiddie rides as well as one at the far end of the park, done in ATSF colors, as well as a sky ride/chairlift system, with a single station, both of which allowed patrons to view the entire park.

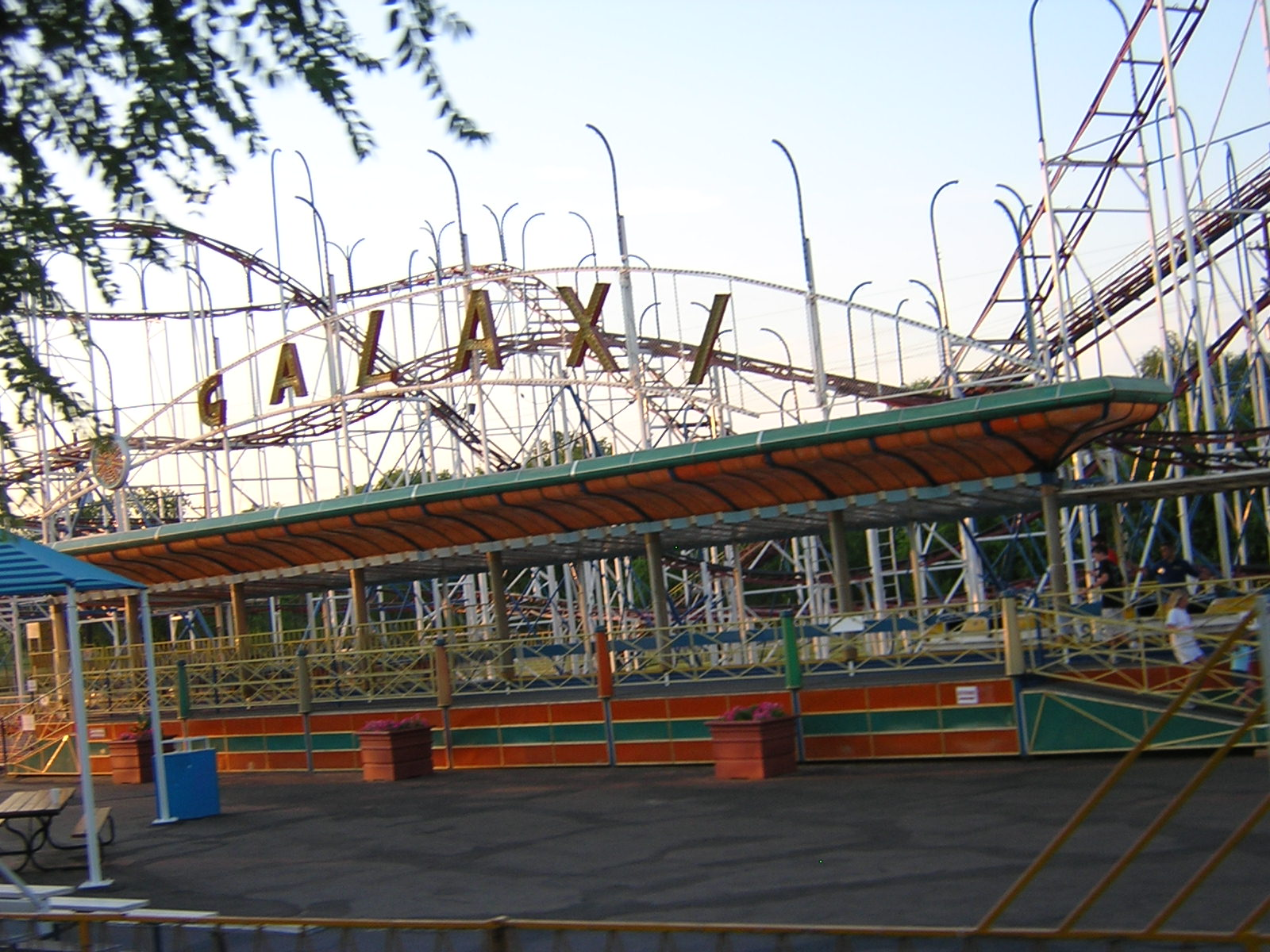
Galaxi coaster

== Rides ==
The park had about 30 rides, including 3 roller coasters. There was an old time carousel at the park entrance which featured classic advertisements on the top, as well as a selection of typical rides such as a Trabant, Scrambler, and bumper cars.

=== Roller coasters ===
Name	Opened	Manufacturer	Description
Galaxi	1990	S.D.C.	A Galaxi roller coaster model.
Dragon Wagon	2017	Wisdom	A Dragon Wagon roller coaster.
Sand Storm	2019	Cavazza Diego	A small Blizzard roller coaster.

=== Thrill rides ===
Name	Opened	Manufacturer	Description
The X-Factor Extreme	2018	KMG	A Freak Out pendulum ride.
Grizzly	2005	Wisdom	A Genesis ride.
Dare Devil Drop	2009	Larson/ARM Rides	A Drop Tower that stands 140 feet tall ride.
Musik Express	1990	Mack Rides	A Musik Express ride.
Roll-O-Plane	1983	Eyerly	A Roll-O-Plane ride.
Rock-O-Plane	1973	Eyerly	A Rock-O-Plane ride.
Scrambler	1973	Eli Bridge Co.	A classic Scrambler ride.
Space Shuttle	1988	Morgan	A Space Shuttle-themed swinging ship ride.
Spider	1980	Eyerly	A Space Shuttle-themed swinging ship ride.
Tilt-A-Whirl	1988	Sellner Manufacturing	A traditional Tilt-A-Whirl ride.
Trabant	1968	Chance Manufacturing	A Trabant ride.

=== Family rides ===
Name	Opened	Manufacturer	Description
Dizzy Dragons	2002	SBF Visa Group	A spinning dragon ride.
Carousel	1960	C.W. Parker Co	A classic Carousel ride. Originally built in 1902
Bumper Cars	1982	Pinfari	A classic Bumper Cars ride.
Skyride	1979	Hopkins Rides	A chairlift ride.
Train	1979	Crown Metal Products	A Train ride.

=== Kiddie rides ===
Name	Opened	Manufacturer	Description
Rock-It-Express	1982	Ramagosa	A spinning ride similar to the Musik Express.
Antique Cars	1982	Arrow Dynamics	A track car ride.
Big Trucks	2001	Visa International	A track car ride themed to firetrucks.
Boats	1980	Ramagosa	A boat ride.
Helicopters	1979	Molina & Son's	A Helicopter ride.
Sky Fighters	1979	Allan Herschell Company	A plane ride.
Whip	1979	Allan Herschell Company	A Whip ride.

The coasters of the park included:

- The Galaxi is a (standard model with about 36 instances extant) steel coaster manufactured by S.D.C., a defunct Italian coaster manufacturer, in 1971. It was relocated from White Swan Park (Coraopolis, Pennsylvania) in 1989. It had a single train with two cars, two rows of two across riders per car, for a total of eight riders.
- The Little Coaster manufactured by Carl Miler was replaced with a Wisdom Dragon Coaster in 2016.
- Greezed Lightnin' was planned to be installed in 2006 and given a new name. After the ground was set aside, it was found to be unstable, and installation was first delayed and later cancelled. This Schwarzkopf Shuttle Looper was purchased from Astroworld in Houston, Texas. It has a single train with seven cars, with two rows of two riders per car, for a total of twenty-eight riders. The ride was later removed and scrapped by 2019 with its train now being used on Silver Bullet at Frontier City.
- For the 2010 season, Joyland added Dare Devil Drop, a 140-foot (43 m) drop tower ride manufactured by Larson Int. The name Dare Devil Drop was entered in a "name the ride" contest by Wesley Orr, a fifteen-year-old resident of Leonard, Texas. Orr said he thought of the name while reading about the new Evel Knievel roller coaster opening at Six Flags St. Louis that same year. Dare Devil Drop opened on May 24, 2008.
- Dipsy Doodle was the junior coaster that was replaced with the Wisdom Dragon Coaster in 2016.
- In 2018, Joyland added the X-Factor Extreme. This was a pendulum-type ride and the gondolas rotate. The ride swung in a 200 degree arc giving the riders feelings of both positive and negative G-forces. With the rotation of the gondola, no two rides were alike.
- In 2019, Sand Storm, a Cavazza Diego Blizzard model, was installed.

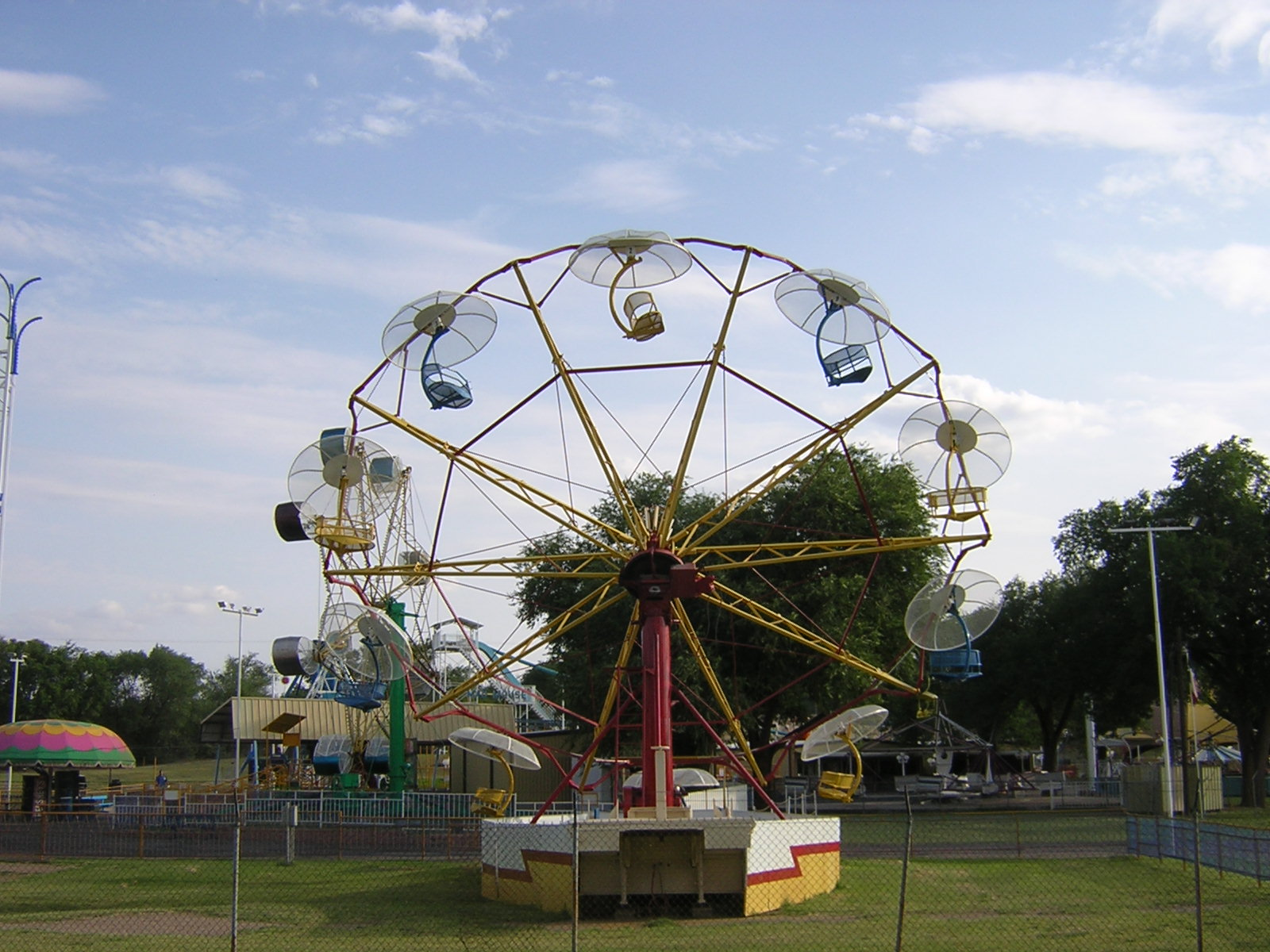
Paratrooper ride
