= Saco Transportation Center =

Train station in Saco, Maine

Saco, ME
- Station building (2026)

General information
- Location: 138 Main Street; Saco, Maine; United States
- Coordinates: 43°29′46″N 70°26′57″W
- Owner: City of Saco
- Platforms: 1 side platform
- Tracks: 1
- Connections: BSOOB Transit

Construction
- Parking: Yes
- Accessible: Yes

Other information
- Station code: Amtrak: SAO

History
- Opened: 2001 (platform), 2009 (station)

Passengers
- FY 2025: 51,816 (Amtrak)

Services
Preceding station	Amtrak	Following station
Wells toward Boston North	Downeaster	Old Orchard Beach toward Brunswick
Former services
Preceding station	Boston and Maine Railroad	Following station
Biddeford toward Boston	Western Route	Old Orchard Beach toward Portland
Location

Saco Transportation Center, also referred to as Saco or Saco–Biddeford in some timetables, is a passenger transportation station on Factory Island in Saco, Maine, served by Amtrak, the national railroad passenger system, and other transportation providers. On average, about 110 passengers daily board or alight Amtrak's Downeaster service at the station, making it the third-busiest stop in Maine. The station is located next to the Pan Am Railways mainline, formerly the Western Route mainline of the Boston & Maine Railroad.

The train platform was constructed in 2001, and the station building was constructed in 2008 and opened in 2009. The station, at 138 Main Street, is owned by the City of Saco. The station is notable for being the first green design train station in the U.S. When it was built, it featured a wind turbine for electricity, geothermal heating and cooling systems, and a roof made from recycled soda bottles; however, the wind turbine, which cost the city about $200,000, did not produce the expected amount of electricity, and was shut down in 2006 after safety concerns. It was removed in November 2018.

The station serves as the hub for Biddeford Saco Old Orchard Beach Transit.

== Gallery ==
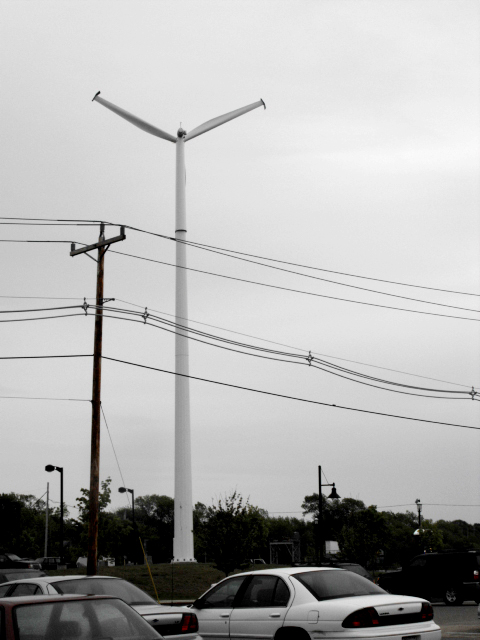
The wind turbine at the Station used to offset power use.

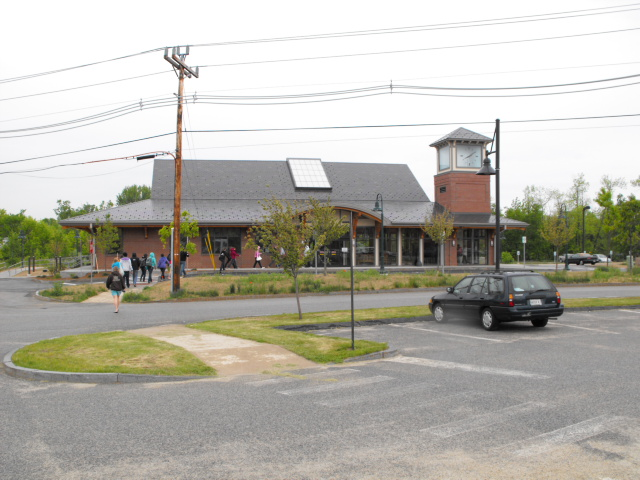
The station from the parking lots
