= Wells Regional Transportation Center =

Train station in Wells, Maine

Wells, ME
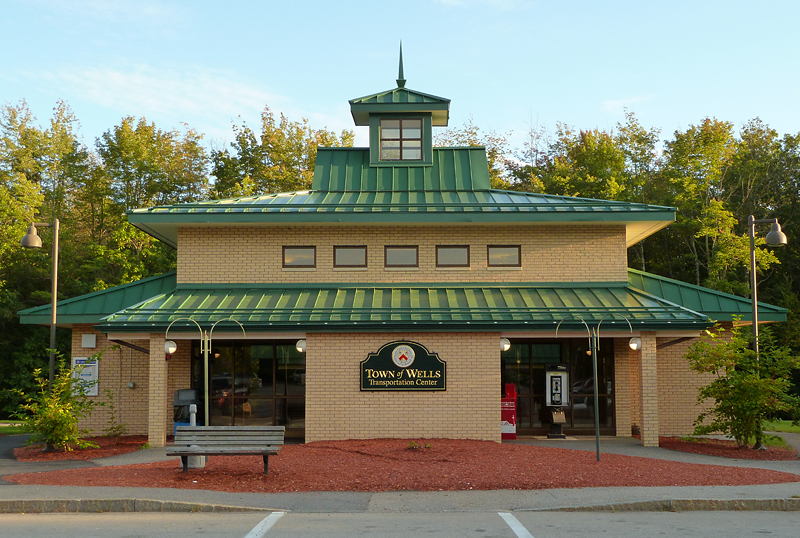
- Wells Regional Transportation Center in 2011

General information
- Other names: Wells Regional Transportation Center
- Location: 696 Sanford Road; Wells, Maine; United States
- Coordinates: 43°19′15″N 70°36′44″W
- Owner: Maine Turnpike Authority (station); CSX Transportation/Northern New England Passenger Rail Authority (platform); CSX Transportation (track)
- Platforms: 2 side platforms
- Tracks: 2

Construction
- Parking: 200 spaces
- Cycle facilities: Yes
- Accessible: Yes

Other information
- Station code: Amtrak: WEM

History
- Opened: December 15, 2001

Passengers
- FY 2025: 63,093 (Amtrak)

Services
Preceding station	Amtrak	Following station
Dover toward Boston North	Downeaster	Saco toward Brunswick
Location

Wells Regional Transportation Center is an Amtrak train station in Wells, Maine. The station sits next to the Pan Am Railways mainline, formerly the Western Route mainline of the Boston and Maine Railroad.

== History ==
In 1993, the town of Wells voted to build a transportation center for intercity buses and then-planned Amtrak service. Downeaster service began on December 15, 2001, with only a platform at Wells. The station building was constructed in 2002 and opened in 2003.

The Northern New England Passenger Rail Authority (NNEPRA) added a 6-mile (9.7 km) second track through Wells to allow an additional daily Brunswick-Wells round trip which was completed in December 2024. The project will also add a second platform and a footbridge to the Wells station, which started construction in March 2025 and is planned to be completed late in the fall of 2026. The plan was issued in 2019; In February 2020, NNEPRA was awarded a $16.9 million federal grant for the project. The new platform opened on October 26, 2026.
