= Biddeford–Saco Mills Historic District =

Historic district in Maine, United States

- U.S. National Register of Historic Places
- U.S. Historic district
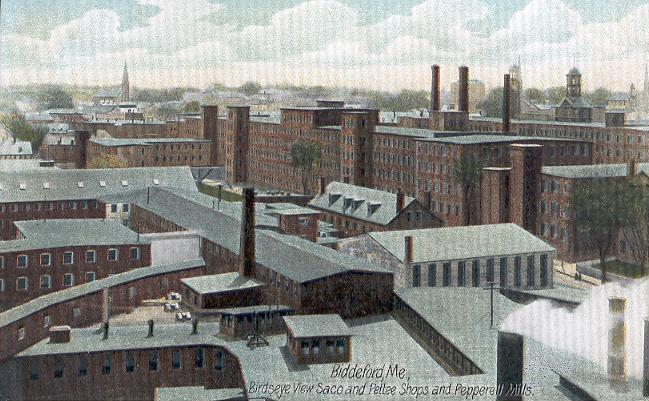
- Bird's-eye View of the Saco–Pettee Machine Shops and Pepperell Mills from a 1906 postcard.

- Location within Maine Location within the United States
- Location: Bounded by Pearl, Lincoln, York and Main Streets, Biddeford, Gooch and Saco Streets; also 1 and 30 Gooch St., Biddeford and Saco, Maine
- Coordinates: 43°29′38″N 70°27′18″W
- Area: 38 acres (15 ha)
- Architect: Amos D. Lockwood et al.
- Architectural style: Greek Revival, Italianate
- NRHP reference No.: 08001258 (original); 100008478 (increase)

Significant dates
- Added to NRHP: December 30, 2008
- Boundary increase: December 22, 2022

The Biddeford–Saco Mills Historic District encompasses the historic mill complex that flanks both sides of the Saco River in Biddeford and Saco, Maine. It covers 38 acres (15 ha) of property adjacent to both cities' downtown areas which has seen industrial uses since the 18th century, and presently contains a collection of well-preserved 19th and early-20th century industrial buildings. The district was added to the National Register of Historic Places in 2008. Many of the buildings in the district have been rehabilitated and repurposed for other uses, including residential, commercial, and industrial.

== Description ==
The district has more than forty historically significant structures spread across 38 acres (15 ha). Six buildings are located on Factory Island, south of Gooch Street and west of Main Street. In Biddeford, the district is bounded on the south by Main, York, and Lancaster Streets, on the west by Lincoln Street, and on the north by Pearl Street. Two of buildings on Saco Island are noted for their length: the York Mills #1 and #4, which are oriented roughly east–west across the center of the island parallel to each other, are more than 500 feet (150 m) long.

== History ==
The industrial history of the Saco–Biddeford area began in the 1760s, when Thomas Cutts, a merchant and ship owner purchased the island in the Saco River between the two city centers. Now within Saco city limits, it became known as Cutts Island, later called Saco Island.

Cutts established a lumber mill and in 1811 iron works founded by Cutts and Josiah Calef. In 1826 the first textile mill was built on the island. The oldest building in the mill complex was built in 1832-33 by the York Manufacturing Company. From this beginning the industrial growth of the area proceeded, occupying the entire island and a large adjacent area on the Biddeford shore. The most recent historically significant building was built about 1940.

== See also ==
- National Register of Historic Places listings in York County, Maine
