= Biddeford Saco Old Orchard Beach Transit =

Public transportation in York County

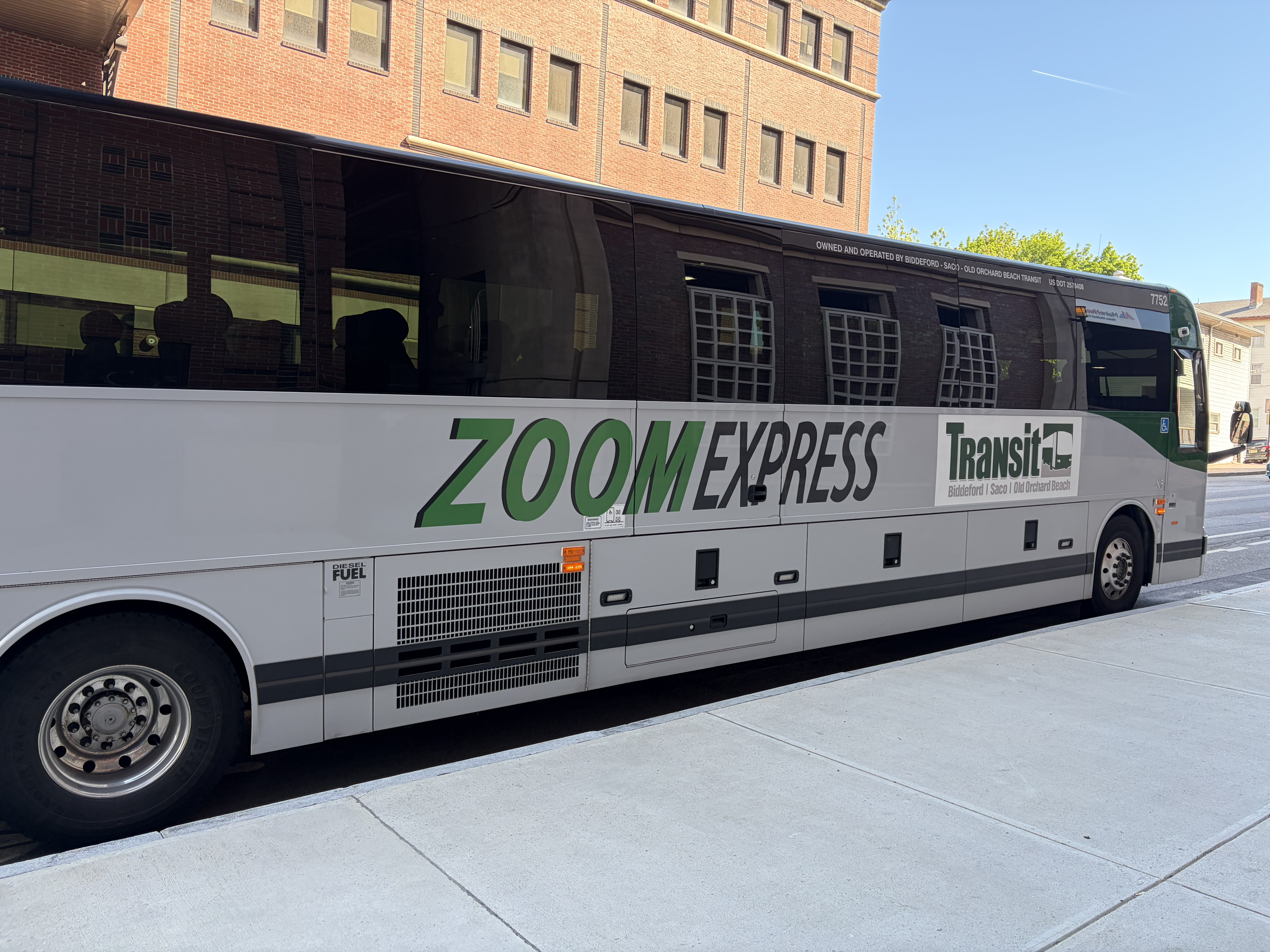
- A ZOOM Express bus in 2026
- Headquarters: 13 Pomerleau Street, Biddeford, Maine
- Service area: York County, Cumberland County, Maine
- Service type: Bus service
- Routes: 8 year-round 3 seasonal
- Hubs: Saco Transportation Center
- Annual ridership: 258,124 (fiscal year 2023)
- Website: bsoobtransit.org

Biddeford Saco Old Orchard Beach Transit (or BSOOB) is the primary public transportation provider in the communities of Southern Maine in York County. The services encompass fixed bus routes in Biddeford, Saco, Scarborough and Old Orchard Beach, as well as an express commuter bus service operating between Biddeford-Saco and Portland. BSOOB Transit also operates a seasonal trolley to meet the demand of tourists. The central transportation hub, the Saco Transportation Center, inaugurated in 2019, serves as a pivotal point where the year-round services connect for customer transfers. At the Saco Transportation Center, the public can also access Amtrak's Downeaster service, York County Community Action Corporation (YCCAC) connections, and other private taxi services.

== Routes ==
Route	Terminal	Major streets/routing	Major stops
50 Orange / Biddeford Crossing	Saco Transportation Center	Main St to Alfred St to Biddeford Spur to Elm St	Biddeford Hannaford, Biddeford YMCA, Barra Rd medical offices, Southern Maine Health Center, Biddeford Crossing, Biddeford Walmart
51 Black / Biddeford Crossing	Saco Transportation Center	Main St to Elm St to Alfred St to Biddeford Spur to Alfred St	Biddeford Hannaford, YMCA, Barra Rd medical offices, Southern Maine Health Center, Biddeford Crossing, Walmart
52 White / Saco Industrial Park - OOB	Saco Transportation Center	Main St to North St to Industrial Park Rd to Spring Hill Rd to Rte. 1 to Ocean Park Rd to Saco Ave	Shaw's, Funtown Splashtown USA, Jimmy the Greeks, Saco Ave Walgreens, Cascade Plaza
53 Blue / OOB – Saco Industrial Park	Saco Transportation Center	Main St to Scamman St to Ocean Park Rd to Temple Ave to West Grand Ave to Cascade Rd to Saco Ave to Rte. 1 to Spring Hill Rd to Industrial Park Rd to Spring St	Shaw's, The Pines, OOB Chamber, Cascade Plaza, Jimmy the Greeks, Funtown Splashtown,
54 Silver Line - Downtown Circulator	Saco Transportation Center	Main St, Pool St, Cutts Ave, University of New England	North Dam Mill, UNE Alfond Forum, UNE Campus Center, Main & Lincoln, Lincoln & Pearl, Cutts Ave, Saco Main St
60 Green / Saco-Old Orchard-Scarborough-Portland	Saco Transportation Center	Main St, Ocean Park Rd, Saco Ave, Cascade Rd, Blue Star Memorial Hwy, Campus Dr, Maine Turnpike, Philbrooke Ave, Western Ave, I-295, Congress St, Franklin St	Saco Ave Walgreens, Ready Seafood, Enterprise Dr, 200 Route 1 Cheese Iron, 100 Campus Dr, Maine Mall, Portland City Hall, St John St, St John St, Maine Mall, 100 Campus Dr, 213 Route 1 Pat's Pizza, Enterprise Dr, Ready Seafood, School St & Saco Ave
70 Zoom Express	Exit 32 Park & Ride/Saco Transportation Center	Gold Star Memorial Hwy, I-295, Congress St, Elm St, Preble St Ext	Exit 36 Park & Ride, Mercy at The Fore, MMC Garage, Bramhall & Congress, High & Congress, Monument Square, Bedford & Forest

== Governance ==
BSOOB Transit is a Transit Committee formed in 1972 between the communities of Biddeford, Saco, and Old Orchard Beach. The Committee consists of three representatives from each of the owner communities. The Committee meets on a regular schedule to provide guidance and direction to Transit Staff.

== Fares and DiriGo System ==
BSOOB Transit, along with Greater Portland Metro and the South Portland Bus Service, participates in a regional fare collection system known as DiriGo Pass. This system uses the UMO Pass platform developed by Cubic. Passengers are able to load funds onto their account and pay fares using a smartcard or the UMO mobile app. Standard fares are $2 for all local services, and $5 for the #70 Zoom Express service. Passengers may transfer for free within 90 minutes if using the mobile app or smartcard. If transferring to the #70 Zoom Express, passengers pay the difference in fare. This program also allows for customers to take advantage of a fare capping system. The daily fare is capped at $6 for local fares or $15 for the #70 Zoom Express, after reaching that amount in a calendar day, no more fares will be charged to the account. Fares are also capped at $60 in a calendar month for local fares, and $150 for #70 Zoom Express fares. Reduced fare is half of the normal fare, and the monthly and daily caps are half of the standard caps. Reduced fares are applicable for persons with disabilities, anyone over 65, veterans, youth ages 6–18, and Medicare card holders. Cash continues to be accepted; however, no free transfers are available.

== Fleet ==
Biddeford Saco Old Orchard Beach Transit owns a fleet of 21 revenue vehicles, including 8 Hometown trolley buses that operate seasonally in and around Old Orchard Beach.

Biddeford Saco Old Orchard Beach Transit vehicles
Year	Manufacturer	Model	Agency ID	Type
2008	Gillig	BRT	861	Standard Low Floor Transit
2009	Gillig	Low Floor (Hybrid)	6623 (Hybrid)	Standard Transit Low Floor
2010	ElDorado	TK	29	Standard Transit
2010	Gillig	Low Floor Hybrid	2091, 8409	Standard Transit Low Floor
2012	Gillig	Low Floor Hybrid	1294	Standard Transit Low Floor
2015	MCI	D4500	3659	Commuter Coach
2021	Hometown	Mainstreet	2159, 2161, 2162, 2163, 2164, 2165, 2166, 2671	Trolley Replica
2021	Prevost	X3-45	7752, 7753	Commuter Coach
2022	Proterra	ZX5	0554, 0555	Battery Electric Low Floor

== See also ==
- Public transportation in Maine
