= Alabama Adventure & Splash Adventure =

Water and amusement park in Alabama

Alabama Adventure Amusement Park & Splash Adventure Water Park
- Previously known as List: VisionLand (1998–2005); Alabama Adventure (2006–2011); Splash Adventure (2012–2013); Alabama Splash Adventure (2014–2018)
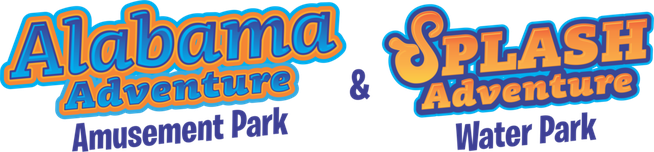
- Interactive map of Alabama Adventure Amusement Park & Splash Adventure Water Park
- Location: Bessemer, Alabama, U.S.
- Coordinates: 33.3800°N 86.9987°W
- Status: Operating
- Opened: May 23, 1998; 28 years ago
- Owner: Koch Family Parks
- Operating season: May through September
- Area: 89 acres (0.36 km^{2}) (formerly 200 acres (0.81 km^{2}))

Attractions
- Total: 28
- Roller coasters: 2
- Water rides: 9
- Website: https://alabamaadventure.com/

Alabama Adventure & Splash Adventure (previously known as VisionLand, Alabama Adventure, Splash Adventure and Alabama Splash Adventure) is a water park and amusement park in Bessemer, Alabama. It is owned by Koch Family Parks, which consists of members of the family who formerly had minority ownership in Holiday World & Splashin' Safari.

== History ==
Wordmark Alabama Adventure logo used from 2006 to 2011

Alabama Splash Adventure logo from 2014 until 2018

Originally known as VisionLand, the park was built largely as a result of efforts by Fairfield mayor Larry Langford. Eleven cities came together to form the West Jefferson Amusement and Public Park Authority and with help from the Alabama Legislature, the group borrowed $60 million to build the park. Construction began in March 1997, and the park opened for business on May 23, 1998. The park opened with four major areas, including Celebration City Theme Park, Steel Waters Water Park, a children's area called Marvel City, and a shopping/dining area known as Main Street.

In 1999, the park expanded, adding Wilde River Gorge, a river rapids attraction. Dino Domain, a dinosaur-themed walk through exhibit featuring animatronic dinosaurs, was built in the woods behind Main Street but closed after the season.

In 2001, Wild River Gorge reopened with minor adjustments along with Stratosfear Screamer, an S&S Power twin tower attraction.

The park filed Chapter 9 bankruptcy in 2002, and only operated Steel Waters. Themeparks LLC, an amusement park operator known for their success with Kentucky Kingdom in Louisville, Kentucky, made a bid to buy VisionLand, but withdrew it when the price for the park became too high. The park was then purchased by Southland Entertainment Group for $5.25 million, a loss of approximately $26 million in public funds.

In 2003, Visionland (uncapitalizing the "L") reopened with Magic Adventure Theme Park, Splash Beach Water Park, Marvel City, and Celebration Street. Magic Adventure received a scrambler attraction called Wild Scrambler and Splash Beach received a wave pool named Kahuna Waves and a nine-story-tall free fall slide called Acapulco Drop. Starting that season park guests had the option to buy tickets to either the amusement park or the water park or a combo ticket to both parks.

Splash Beach received a new water attraction called Splashdown!, a toilet bowl-style ride in 2004.

In 2005, Magic Adventure opened the first new roller coaster since the park's opening named Zoomerang, a Vekoma Boomerang roller coaster relocated from Sydney, Australia. The park also re-opened one of the former attractions named Cahaba Falls, a log flume attraction. It was later known as Woodchuck Run. The park held naming contests for both attractions on its website. The theme park was visited by approximately 345,000 people, making the park Alabama's second-most popular tourist destination according to the Bureau of Tourism and Travel and trailing only the Birmingham Zoo.

Southland announced in 2006, the rebranding of the park under the Alabama Adventure name, along with major expansion plans, including a hotel with an indoor water park, an RV park, and other amenities. Magic Adventure was renamed Magic City USA to reflect the new theming strategy. The park also announced plans for a summer concert series, featuring popular musical acts and artists. The number of visitors to Alabama Adventure rose to more than 388,000. It was the winner of Alabama's "2007 Attraction of the Year".

In 2007, the park added two new attractions, including Vertigo, one of the original attractions of VisionLand, which had been removed in 2003, and Salamander Bay, a re-themed children's play area at Splash Beach formerly known as Quarry Bay. The summer concert series returned to the park and became an annual event.

Southland Entertainment sold the park to Adrenaline Family Entertainment, a group of former executives of Six Flags in 2008. Southland concentrated on developing the remaining acreage that it owns adjacent to the park, with plans for hotels, an RV park, and other amenities.

In 2009, the park announced the first major expansion since 2005, and the first to Splash Beach since 2004. The expansion included a new attraction from WhiteWater West called "UpSurge!", a 216-foot flume slide with a vertical half pipe ending in a 25,000-gallon splash pool. The park also combined both parks into one ticket price.

The park began promoting a casting call for new "indoor theatrical entertainment" called "Beat Street" that premiered in the brand new Star Theater in 2010. The park also relaunched its website, branding the park as Alabama Adventure Water and Theme Park.

Buzzsaw Falls, a SkyTrans Manufacturing Shoot the Chutes ride was added in 2011, but only lasted for one summer. It was located between the parks Celebration Street and Stratos Fear Screamer tower ride. This ride was purchased by Schlitterbahn in Corpus Christi, Texas where it was renamed "Padre Plunge".

Adrenaline Family Entertainment sold the park on January 5, 2012, to General Attractions LLC, a company created by the former owners of the park who previously sold the park in 2008. It was announced on April 5, 2012 that the amusement park section would be closed, leaving only water rides. The park was renamed Splash Adventure for its 2012 opening season. Also for 2012, three new attractions were added to the water park. One of their new attractions was called the "Mist-ical Maze" where in this attraction you go through a maze that has trigger water chutes and many other surprises. The second new attraction was a wipeout designed ride from WhiteWater West called "Wipeout Adventure Course" and the third new attraction was a zip-line that goes around the waterpark. There was a "Dive-In Movie" at Kahuna Waves every Friday night from Memorial Day weekend to the end of July.

In March 2014, Koch Family Parks, founded by former Holiday World & Splashin' Safari CEO Dan Koch and his sister Natalie, purchased the park. New additions to the park included five new kids rides consisting of a new kids roller coaster, a train, two boat rides, mini helicopters and a laser maze.

In 2015 Rampage, the park's signature wooden roller coaster, reopened after a complete restoration.

In 2018, the park added new attractions including a rocking tugboat, scrambler, a fast-spinning ride, a yo-yo swing ride, a miniature children's train ride, and a children's water slide complex. They also introduced a weekend autumn festival in October of that same year. A year later, for the 2019 season, the park introduced three new attractions; Freefall, a 75 foot tall water slide; Galleon, a pirate ship ride; and Twister, a body slide located by Freefall.

On Christmas Day (December 25, 2020), following a month-long teaser campaign, Alabama Adventure announced a new addition for the 2021 season; Rocket Racer, a new six-lane mat racer water slide, which would stand more than 50 feet (15 m) tall and represent their largest waterpark expansion to date.

For 2022, this amusement park introduced "Cheddar Chase", a wild mouse roller coaster ride previously from Lake Winnepesaukah in Georgia and Self Powered Bikes for kids to replace "Crank and Roll". In addition, its water park attraction "Castaway Island" was renamed "Cocoa Island".

== Incidents and accidents ==
- In 1999, when the park was called Visionland, five people were injured when a raft on the Wild River Gorge rapids ride overturned.
- In 2001, a raft on the Wild River Gorge filled with park employees overturned when the employees rocked the boat. No one was injured.
- In August 2009, a family of three and one other park visitor were injured when the Wild River Gorge's boat capsized. Witnesses said that the family's boat hit an empty boat and was overturned. The family was underwater for approximately 20 seconds.
- In June 2011, a fight broke out between several youths and spread throughout the park. One guest described it as a "borderline riot". The Bessemer Police were called to the park and no more guests were allowed into the park. It was blamed on a "$10 before 10AM" promotion the park ran.
- In June 2018, a ten-year-old boy hit his head while floating along the Warrior River. Lifeguards came to his aid and the boy was subsequently sent to Children's Hospital.

== Current attractions ==
=== Water attractions/rides ===
Name	Opened	Manufacturer	Description
Cocoa Island	2022		A multi-level colorful water play area for children with slides, geysers, and other water features. It was previously Castaway Island.
Splash Kahuna Waves	2003		An 800,000 gallon wave pool with 4 ft (1.2 m) waves. Formerly had a real sand beach but now is concrete.
Mist-ical Maze	2012		A booby-trapped labyrinth with trigger water chutes.
Neptune's Plunge (formerly Mineshaft)	1998	WhiteWater West	Four enclosed tube slides.
Salamander Bay (formerly Quarry Bay)	1998	WhiteWater West	A water play area for smaller children. Re-themed, including new slides and other features, in 2007.
Splash Island	2018	Proslide Technology	Kids area with five mini water slides.
UpSurge!	2009		A 216-foot flume that takes riders up and down a vertical half pipe and end in a 25,000-gallon pool of water.
Warrior River	1998		A relaxing "lazy river" style ride.
Wipeout Adventure Course	2012		A water-filled obstacle course.
Free-Fall	2019		An aquatic speeding drop slide.
Twister	2019	WhiteWater West	A rotating aquatic drop slide.
Rocket Racer	2021	WhiteWater West	A gigantic matt racer slide. It is next to the Rampage roller coaster. This water slide was previously known as "Twisted Six" at Hydro Adventures in Poplar Bluff, Missouri.
Slidewinder	2024	Proslide Technology	A four-person raft slide that measures nearly 500 feet in length and stands close to 50 feet tall.

=== Dry rides ===
Name	Opened	Manufacturer	Description
Scrambler	2018	Eli Bridge	A traditional Eli Bridge scrambler. This spinning ride is across from Rockin' Tug.
Yo-Yo	2018	Chance Rides	A Yo-yo swing ride. Its location is next to Rockin' Tug near the Rampage roller coaster.
Drop Zone	2016	Zamperla	A Thirty-foot tall drop tower ride.
Teacups	2016	Zamperla	A super-sized ride with six rotating teacups.
Tilt-A-Whirl	2018	Larson	A fast-spinning ride. It is across from Yo-Yo.
Centi-Speed	2014	Fajume	Wacky Worm style roller coaster. Its previous location was at Gillians Wonderland Pier.
Little Bumpers	2014		Electric Kiddie Bumper Boats.
Rockin' Tug	2018	Zamperla	A whimsical tug boat ride that features rocking and spinning motions. Its location is next to Yo-Yo near the Rampage roller coaster.
Little Harbor	2014	Allen Herschell	Classic boat ride dating to 1949.
Splash Express	2014	Zamperla	A Rio Grande Train Ride.
Jump Around	2014	Zamperla	A Jump Around with frog themed cars.
Royal Express	2018		A gentle train ride that goes off the rails.
Crank and Roll	2014	Alter Enterprises	Individual hand crank cars reintroduced in their original location of this park.
"The Vault" laser maze challenge	2014		Music, sound and lighting effects come to life, immersing you in the adrenaline-packed experience.
Rampage	1998/2015	Custom Coasters International	A wooden out-and-back roller coaster. Re-opened in 2015 after a 3-year absence.
Galleon	2019	Zamperla	A swinging pirate ship purchased from Bowcraft Amusement Park.
Cheddar Chase	2022	L&T Systems	Single car trains. Riders are arranged 2 across in 2 rows for a total of 4 riders per car.

== Former attractions ==
Name	Year opened	Year closed	Type	Description
Typhoon	1998	1999	A polyp style ride.	Replaced by two upcharge attractions in 1999. The Scrambler opened in this location in 2003.
Loc-O-Motion	1998	2003	A children's hand truck style ride.	The Convoy was relocated to this spot in 2005, however in 2014, Loc-O-Motion was introduced in this location as Crank and Roll.
Patriot	2003	2006	A Round Up ride.	Replaced the Voyager. For the 2007 season Patriot was removed and the Voyager was re-installed and renamed the Vertigo.
Rockwall/Venturer	1999	2000	Two up-charge attractions.	Rockwall was a portable rockwall guests could climb and Venturer was a small motion simulator. Replaced Typhoon. The Scrambler opened in this location in 2003.
StratosFear Screamer	2001	2011	S&S Power FreeFall	It featured Launch (A Space Shot) and Re-Entry (A Turbo Drop). When the owners filed bankruptcy, Southland had then bought the park in 2002 and removed the Turbo Drop half because they couldn't afford to keep it running, and they kept the Space Shot side (thus renaming it to Space Shot, then reverted to StratosFear Screamer in 2009), which was removed after the 2011 season and relocated to Six Flags Darien Lake in 2013 as Blast Off. S&S regained ownership of the Turbo Drop and sold it to Lake Compounce, where it then reopened in 2004 as Down Time.
Barnstormer	1998	2011	Zamperla Mini Jet	
Marvel City Speedway	1998	2011	Zamperla Speedway	
Adventure Express	1998	2011	Zamperla Rio Grande Train	
Ballon Wheel	1998	2011	Zamperla Midi Wheel	
Motorcross	1998	2011	Hampton Motorcycle Jump	
Convoy	1998	2011	Sartori Convoy Trucks	Moved to former Loc-O-Motion location in 2005
Bump-A-Round	1998	2011	Bertazzon Kiddie Bumper cars	
Buzzsaw Falls	2011	2011	SkyTrans Manufacturing Shoot the Chute	Sold to Schlitterbahn. Opened in May 2017 as "Padre Plunge" at Schlitterbahn Corpus Christi. This ride was heavily damaged by Hurricane Harvey three months later. It was demolished in March 2020.
Woodchuck Run (formerly Cahaba Falls)	1998	2011	Arrow Dynamics log flume	The log boats from this ride were sold to various Six Flags Theme Parks as extra log boats for other passengers of particular log flume rides. Operated from 1998 to 2011;In storage 2003–2004
Wild River Gorge	1999	2011	FAB river rapids ride	Operated briefly in 1999; Reopened in 2001
Giant Wheel	1998	2011	Mondial Ferris wheel	
Hurricane	1998	2011	Bertazzon Musik Express	Moved to Sylvan Beach Amusement Park in Sylvan Beach, New York where it operates as Himalaya.
Scrambler	2003	2011	Eli Bridge Scrambler	Reopened in 2018.
Vertigo	1998	2011	Huss Enterprise	Operated from 1998 to 2011; In storage 2003–2006
Mind Spinner	1998	2011	Fabbri Crazy Dance	
Fender Bender	1998	2011	Bertazzon Bumper cars	
Tidal Wave	1998	2011	Zierer Wave Swinger	
Pirate Ship	1998	2011	Huss Pirate Ship	
Midway Carousel	1998	2011	Chance Rides Carousel	
Helicopter Heroes	2014	2015	Zamperla Mini Enterprise	Originally operated at Waldameer & Water World as Mini Enterprise.
Acapulco Drop	2003	2015	Speed slide	The slide was retired after the 2015 season due to its poor condition and rough ride experience, and replaced by the more modern Freefall in 2019.
Splashdown	2004	2018	Body bowl slide	Splashdown was removed after the 2018 season due to concerns over many guests being unable to swim in the dropout pool and thus increasing pressure on staff. The attraction was immediately replaced by the Twister body slide.
Marvel Mania	1998	2011	An E&F Miler Industries steel family roller coaster	Relocated to Elitch Gardens in 2013 and currently operates as Blazin' Buckaroo.
Zoomerang	2005	2011	A Vekoma Boomerang roller coaster	Relocated from the defunct Wonderland in Sydney, Australia. Removed in 2013 and sold to Wonderla in India where it currently operates as Recoil.
Zipline	2012	2013	Zipline	Portable zip line. Removed and sold prior to the 2014 season.

== See also ==
- 2012 in amusement parks
