= Old Orchard Beach station =

Train station in Old Orchard Beach, Maine, United States

Old Orchard Beach, ME
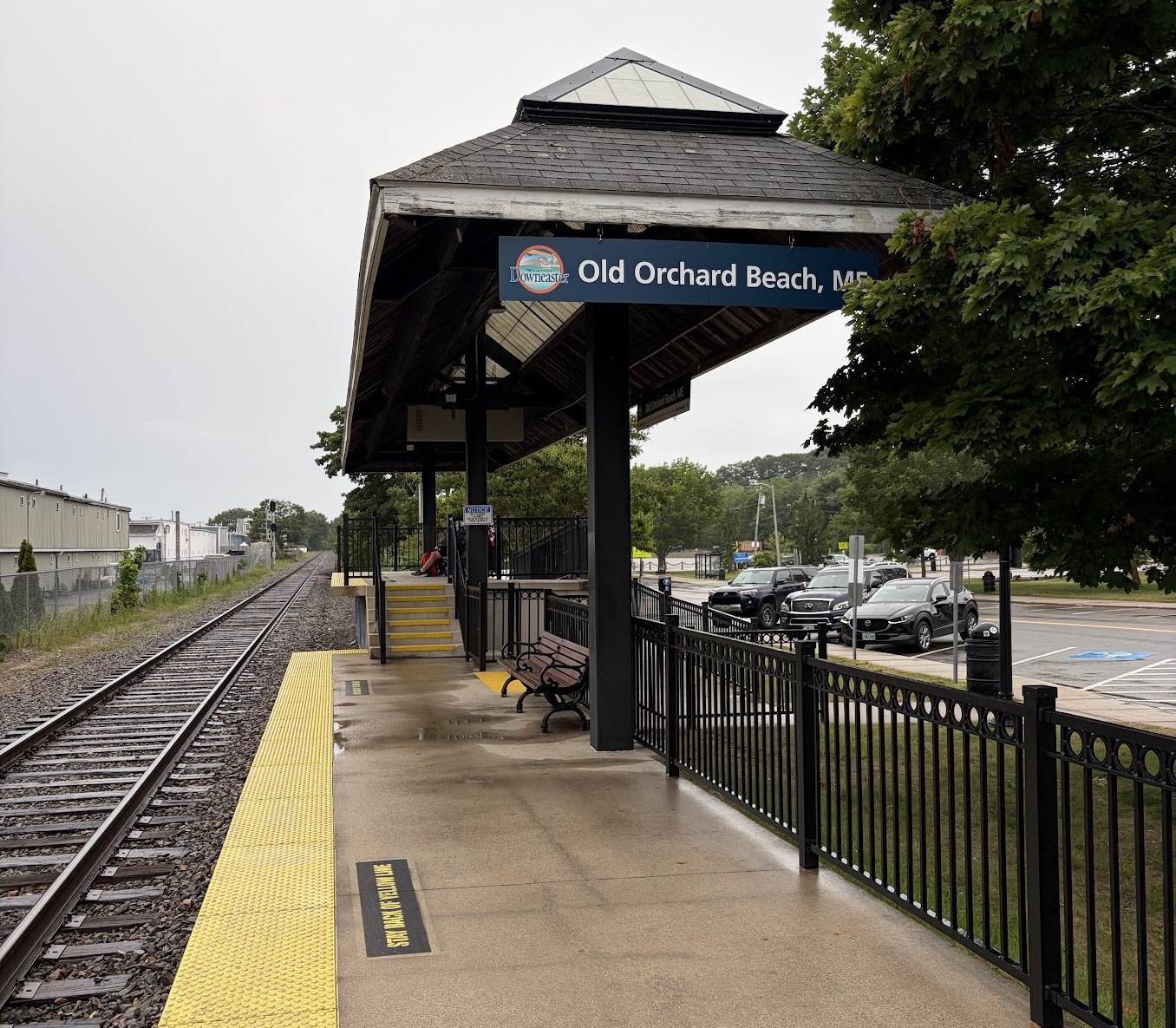
- Looking south (2026)

General information
- Location: 11 First Street; Old Orchard Beach, Maine; United States
- Coordinates: 43°30′52″N 70°22′34″W
- Owner: Town of Old Orchard Beach/CSX Transportation
- Platforms: 1 side platform
- Tracks: 1

Construction
- Parking: Yes; metered
- Accessible: Yes

Other information
- Status: Open seasonally (May–October)
- Station code: Amtrak: ORB

History
- Opened: 2003

Passengers
- FY 2025: 17,494 (Amtrak)

Services
Preceding station	Amtrak	Following station
Saco toward Boston North	Downeaster	Portland toward Brunswick
Former services
Preceding station	Boston and Maine Railroad	Following station
Saco toward Boston	Western Route	Scarboro Beach toward Portland
Location

Old Orchard Beach station is an Amtrak intercity train station in Old Orchard Beach, Maine. It features a covered platform, and is served by Amtrak's Downeaster service seasonally between May and October.

The station is located next to the Pan Am Railways mainline, formerly the Western Route mainline of the Boston & Maine Railroad.

== Notable places nearby ==
The station is within walking distance of the following notable places:

- Old Orchard Beach
- Ocean Park Historic Buildings
- Palace Playland amusement park
- Numerous hotels, motels, shops, and restaurants
