= White Swan Park =

Former amusement park near Pittsburgh, Pennsylvania, United States

- Interactive map of White Swan Park
- Location: Allegheny County, Pennsylvania, USA
- Coordinates: 40.468°N 80.200°W
- Status: Defunct
- Opened: 1955
- Closed: 1989

White Swan Park was a small amusement park on the border of Moon and Findlay townships in Allegheny County, Pennsylvania that operated from 1955 to 1989.

== History ==
The park opened in 1955 with seven rides. It was operated by brother and sister Roy Todd and Margaret Kleeman, who built it along with Kleeman's husband Edward. As the park expanded, it came to occupy about 40 acres (160,000 m^{2}) of land, featuring a children's section and 15 rides, including the Galaxi roller coaster and a train billed as "the longest train ride in the Tri-State". White Swan Park also had a pavilion of midway games, miniature golf, six picnic shelters, a Skee-Ball building, and a refreshment stand. On July 12, 1963, a new miniature golf course opened at the east end of the park.

With construction of the new Pittsburgh International Airport underway in the late 1980s, a reroute of PA 60 (renumbered I-376 in 2009) was needed for access. After the park's 1989 season, Pennsylvania Department of Transportation bought the park with the intention of demolishing it. Dismantling of the park began the following year. The amusements and other artifacts were sold at auction. The Mad Mouse roller coaster was moved to Lakemont Park in Altoona, Pennsylvania, but was later sold and removed in 2003. The Galaxi coaster was moved to Joyland Amusement Park in Lubbock, Texas, where it operated until the park's closing after the 2022 season. The last item from the park to be removed was the Giant Slide. The park's Tilt-A-Whirl is still in operation at Knoebels Amusement Resort in Elysburg, Pennsylvania.

== List of former attractions ==
=== Rides ===
- Ferris wheel
- Galaxi (steel roller coaster) (operated at Joyland Amusement Park in Lubbock, Texas from 1990 to 2022)
- Giant Slide
- Mad Mouse (Wild Mouse roller coaster) (operated at Lakemont Park in Altoona, Pennsylvania from 1991 to 2003)
- Scrambler
- Sports Skooter
- Tilt-A-Whirl (now operates at Knoebels Amusement Resort in Elysburg, Pennsylvania)

=== Kiddieland rides ===
- Airplanes
- Carousel
- Handcars
- Helicopters
- Train
- Locomotive
