= Hydro Adventures =

Amusement park in Missouri, United States

- Previously known as Bluff Falls Water Park
- Location within Missouri
- Location: Poplar Bluff, Missouri, U.S.
- Coordinates: 36°43′57.186″N 90°24′8.776″W
- Status: Defunct
- Opened: May 22, 2003
- Closed: 2020
- Owner: United Parks, LLC
- General manager: Edgar Novoa
- Operating season: Water Park: May-September; Dry Park: Year-Round

Attractions
- Water rides: 7
- Website: hydroadventures.com

Hydro Adventures was an amusement park, waterpark and family entertainment center located in Poplar Bluff, Missouri, and owned by national amusement park operator, United Parks. Hydro Adventures' Water Park operated from May through September, and the Dry Park was open year-round. According to the website, the park consisted of 7 water attractions and 8 dry attractions of varying “thrill levels.” Hydro Adventures was unable to open for the 2020 season due to the COVID-19 pandemic, and was soon put up for sale.

== History ==
Hydro Adventures opened in 2003 as Bluff Falls Water Park. It was purchased in 2014 by United Parks and re-opened under the new name, Hydro Adventures. In addition to the new name, United Parks made improvements to the facility that included the addition of a major new water slide named Twisted Six and a Triple Threat Basketball attraction. The park added five new rides in 2015: the Tiger Coaster, Tilt A Whirl, Truck Stop, Tea Cup, and Spring Ride. They added two new rides in 2016: the Scrambler and Galaxy Coaster. And in 2017 they added a Laser Tag Arena and a 4,300 square foot arcade. Other updates have included new go-carts with a state-of-the-art control system, and renovations to the mini-golf course and batting cages.

Following the park's 2018 season, all dry rides and midway attractions were closed and sold off. For the 2020 season, the park was unable to open as the direct result of the COVID-19 pandemic, with refunds being provided to all season pass holders and pre-purchased tickets. The park began to evaluate its future, with all options under consideration on how to move forwards, including a sale/redevelopment of the park. In early August 2020, park officials announced on social media that they had opted to sell the park to any new buyer, citing the impact of COVID-19 as well as the operator's decline in interest to run the park. After failing to immediately attract a new buyer, the entire contents of Hydro Adventures were actioned off online, with the auction lasting from October 29, 2020, to November 18, 2020. Contents of the catalogue included the park's waterslides, arcade games, tables, chairs, maintenance equipment, kitchen utilities, and more.

== Rides/Attractions ==
=== Water Rides ===
==== Twisted Six ====
A WhiteWater West matt racing water slide with six lanes. Sold to Alabama Splash Adventure in the park auction of November 2020. It was renamed "Rocket Racer".

==== Poseidon’s Pipeline ====
An aggressive water slide on which riders use a tube to slide down the pipeline.

==== Crashing Waves Bay ====
A wave pool with separate sections for calm floating and wave riding.

Accident on Jun 2, 2019: Some kid fell off, causing him to sink.

==== Easy River ====
A lazy river-style water attraction.

Accident #1 on May 30, 2018: an 11 year old boy twisted his ankle while entering.

Accident #2 on June 2, 2019: a tween boy fell off his raft and sank into the water.

==== Splish Splash Bay ====
A shallow water attraction for young children, featuring various age-appropriate slides, spouts and other water features.

=== Dry Attractions ===
==== Ground Rides ====
The following amusement park rides were installed along with a new midway in 2015:

- Tiger Coaster
- Truck Stop
- Hydro Maiden
- Caravan
- Tip & Twirl
- Poplar Hopper

==== Poplar Putters ====
An 18-hole miniature golf course.

==== Tailpipe Alley ====
A challenging go-kart attraction for riders of appropriate age and height.

==== Missouri Bombers ====
Park visitors can test their baseball skill in the park’s batting cages.

==== Triple Threat ====
Hydro Adventures’ basketball attraction.

==== Midway Games ====
- Flying Frogs
- Roller Baller
- Pepsi Toss
