= Excalibur (Funtown Splashtown USA) =

Wooden roller coaster at Funtown Splashtown USA

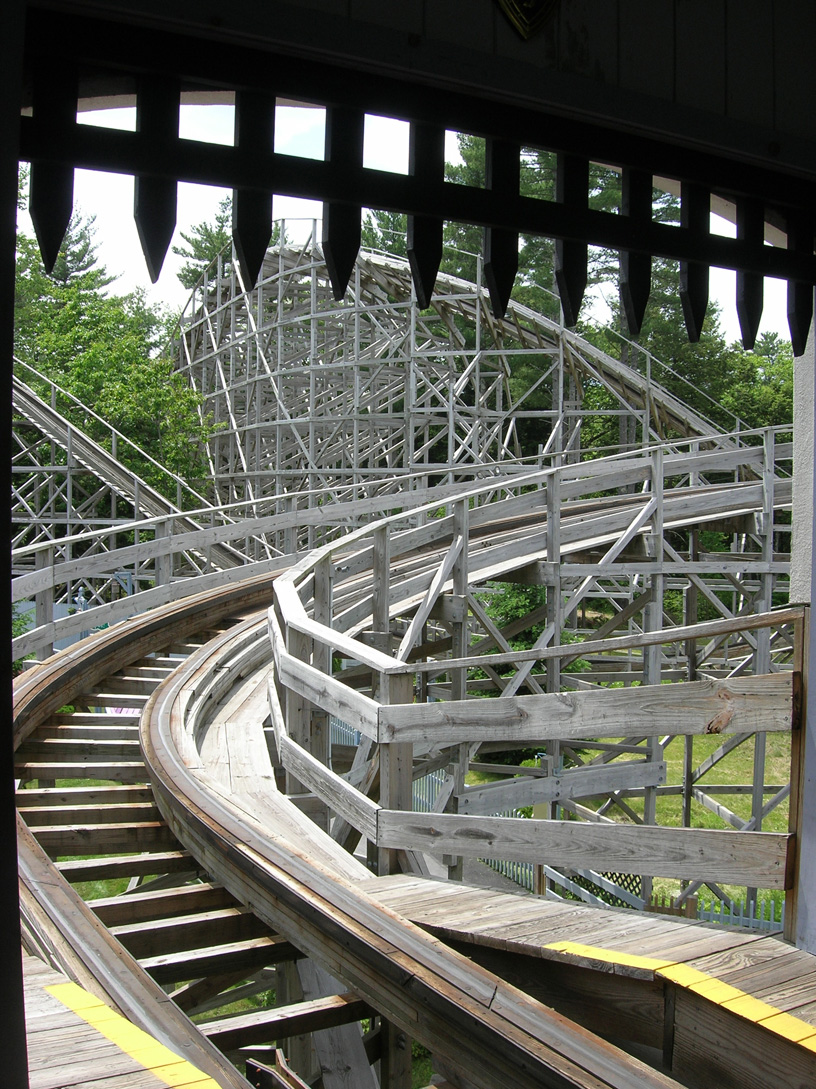

Funtown Splashtown USA
- Location: Funtown Splashtown USA
- Coordinates: 43°31′42″N 70°25′52″W
- Status: Operating
- Opening date: June 5, 1998

General statistics
- Type: Wood
- Manufacturer: Custom Coasters International
- Designer: Dennis McNulty, Larry Bill
- Lift/launch system: Chain lift hill
- Height: 100 ft (30 m)
- Drop: 82 ft (25 m)
- Length: 2,700 ft (820 m)
- Speed: 55 mph (89 km/h)
- Inversions: 0
- Duration: 1:58
- Height restriction: 48 in (122 cm)
- Excalibur at RCDB

Excalibur is a wooden roller coaster at Funtown Splashtown USA in Saco, Maine, United States. It was built by Custom Coasters International, and has since seen retracking by Martin & Vleminckx. It opened on May 22 of 1998. It is 2,700 feet (820 m) long, 100 feet (30 m) tall, features an 82-foot-tall (25 m) drop, and reaches a top speed of 55 miles per hour (89 km/h).

It is the only wooden roller coaster in the state of Maine, and was the first wooden coaster in Maine since 1948 when it opened in 1998.

The ride runs with a single Philadelphia Toboggan Coasters train. The ride's name is taken from King Arthur's sword, Excalibur.

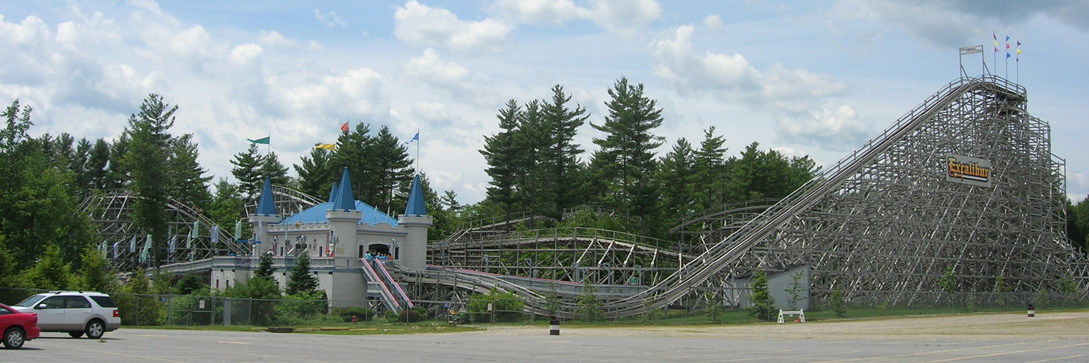
Excalibur as seen from the parking lot

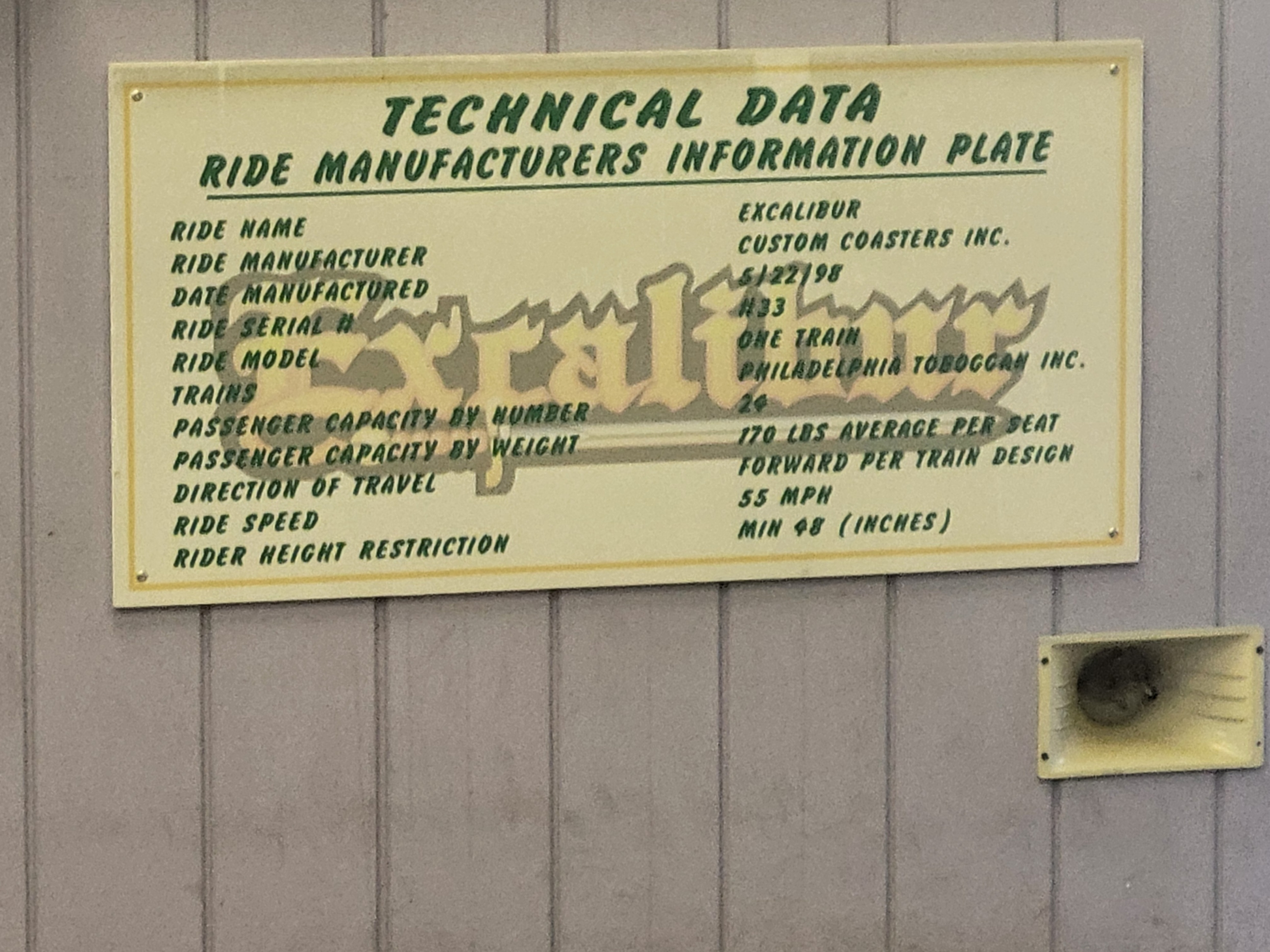
An informational poster displayed in the ride's station
