= Southland Entertainment Group =

American theme park operator

- Industry: Theme parks
- Headquarters: Alabama, United States
- Owners: Team Pro Parks; South Brook Entertainment

Southland Entertainment Group is an Alabama based company that owned Alabama Splash Adventure (formerly known as VisionLand) in Bessemer, Alabama under the name Alabama Adventure Theme Park from January 2, 2003, until May 15, 2008. The company purchased the park for a bid of $5.25 million, which was below the asking price of $25 million. In 2008, Southland Entertainment sold Alabama Adventure Theme Park to Adrenaline Family Entertainment. Southland Entertainment Group is owned by Team Pro Parks and South Brook Entertainment.
