= Funtown Splashtown USA =

Amusement and water park in Saco, Maine

- Previously known as: Marvel Drive-In; (1960‑67); Funtown USA; (1967‑82); Cascade Water and Amusement Park; (1982‑96)

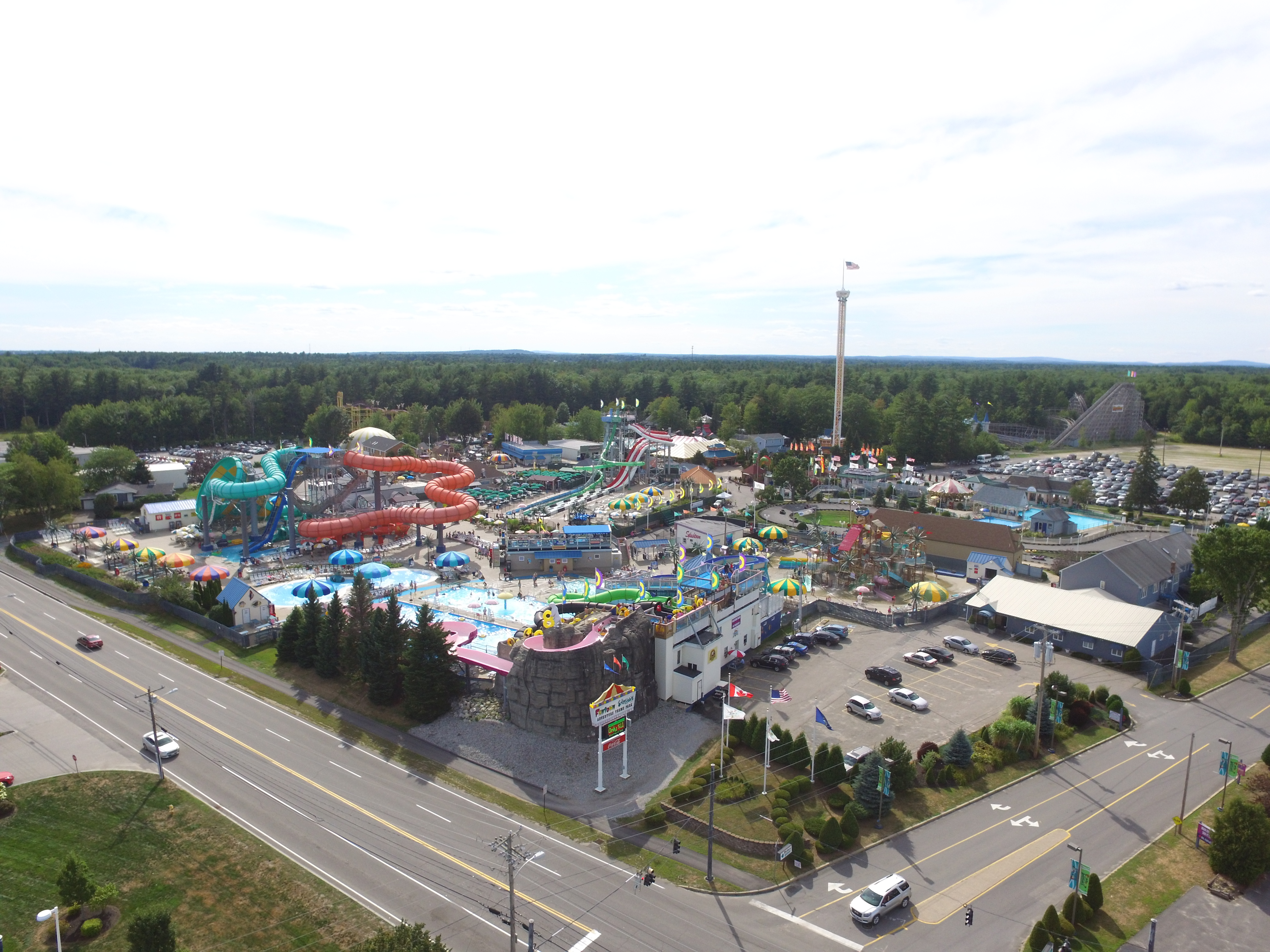
- Funtown as viewed from above US Route 1
- Interactive map of Funtown Splashtown USA
- Location: Saco, Maine, United States
- Coordinates: 43.52725°N 70.42764°W
- Status: Operating
- Opened: 1960
- Owner: Violet Cormier
- Slogan: "Create memories that will last a lifetime!"
- Operating season: May to September
- Area: 25 acres (10 ha)

Attractions
- Total: 27
- Roller coasters: 2
- Water rides: 12
- Website: funtownsplashtownusa.com

Funtown Splashtown USA, often referred to as simply Funtown, is a family-owned amusement park and water park located in Saco, Maine.

== History ==
In 1960, Ken Cormier and his wife Violet opened Marvel Drive-In, a drive-in restaurant, next door to a miniature golf course owned by Ken’s brother-in-law, Andre Dallaire. The golf course had been installed the previous year. In 1963, Andre opened a go-kart track behind the golf course, and in 1964 and 1967, Ken added batting cages and an archery range, respectively, behind Marvel Drive-In. Over the next few years, Cormier and Dallaire added several kiddie and carnival-style rides including SkySlides and Swinging Gyms.

In 1967, Cormier and Dallaire formed a partnership and established Funtown USA. Over the next few years, Funtown added a Zipper, bumper cars, and a Bayern Kurve named “Luv Machine”.

In 1996, Cormier bought out the remaining Dallaire interest at the park, and renamed it to Funtown Splashtown USA with the addition of a water park to the property.

The park features a wooden roller coaster called Excalibur, as well as New England's longest and tallest log flume, Thunder Falls. It also has a 220-foot-tall (67 m) drop tower called Dragon's Descent. One of the park's most popular rides is the Astrosphere, an indoor Scrambler which features a laser light show while playing Electric Light Orchestra's "Fire on High".

The Splashtown water park features Pirate's Paradise, a large interactive water playground. For the 2007 season, the water park's size was doubled in an expansion that added two new water slides, Tornado and Mammoth. An additional expansion in 2012 added another six water slides to Splashtown.

== Current attractions ==
=== Funtown ===
Name	Type	Manufacturer	Year opened
Adult Bumper Boats	Bumper boats	Unknown	1993
Antique Cars	Antique Taxi Cars	Arrow Dynamics	1982
Astrosphere	Scrambler	Eli Bridge Company	1976
Balloon Race	Ferris Wheel	Zamperla	1994
Barney Oldfield Roadsters	Rail-tracked vintage sports cars	Unknown	1993
Cactus Canyon Canoes	Kiddie water ride	Unknown	1982
Casino	Trabant	Chance Morgan	1987
Classic Carousel	Carousel	Chance Rides	1982
Dragon's Descent	Turbo Drop drop tower	S&S – Sansei Technologies	2001
Excalibur	Wooden roller coaster	Custom Coasters International	1998
Flying Trapeze	Swing ride	Chance Rides	1988
Frog Hopper	Frog Hopper junior drop tower ride	S&S Worldwide	2001
Grand Prix Racers	Go-karts	Johnson	1993
Helicopters	Spinning helicopter kiddie ride	Unknown	1972
Kiddie Boats	Spinning boat kiddie ride	Unknown	1976
Kiddie Bumper Boats	Kiddie bumper boats	Unknown	1993
Kiddie Cars	Spinning vehicle ride	Hampton Amusement Company	1972
Kiddie Swings	Kiddie swing ride	Unknown	1972
Kiddie Train	Miniature railway	Unknown	1987
Merry-Go-Round	Carousel	Unknown	1967
Red Baron Planes	Spinning plane kiddie ride	Unknown	1976
Sea Dragon	Swinging ship	Chance Morgan	1987
Sock It To 'Em Bumper Cars	Bumper cars	Soli	1975
Tempest in the Tea Cup	Teacups	Zamperla	1987
Thunderbolt	Flying Bobs	Chance Morgan	1988
Thunder Falls	Log flume	Hopkins	1984
Tilt-A-Whirl	Tilt-A-Whirl	Sellner Manufacturing	1976
Whispering Pines Haunted Hotel	Dark ride	Sally Corporation	2023
Wild Mouse	Steel wild mouse roller coaster	Maurer AG	2009

=== Splashtown ===
Name	Type	Manufacturer	Year opened
Amphitrite's Challenge	Whizzard	WhiteWater West	2012
Corkscrew	Mat slide	Unknown	1982
Fun Lagoon	Lagoon-style pool	Unknown	1999
Liquid Lightning	Inner tube slide	WhiteWater West	1999
Mammoth	Dark Mammoth	ProSlide Technology	2007
Pirate's Paradise	Water playground	Unknown	2003
Poseidon's Plunge	AquaDrop	WhiteWater West	2012
Splash	Inner tube slide	WhiteWater West	1999
Splish	Inner tube slide	WhiteWater West	1999
Swimming Pool	Wading pool	Unknown	1982
Tornado	Tornado 45	ProSlide Technology	2007
Triton's Twist	FlatLine Loop	WhiteWater West	2012

== Former attractions ==
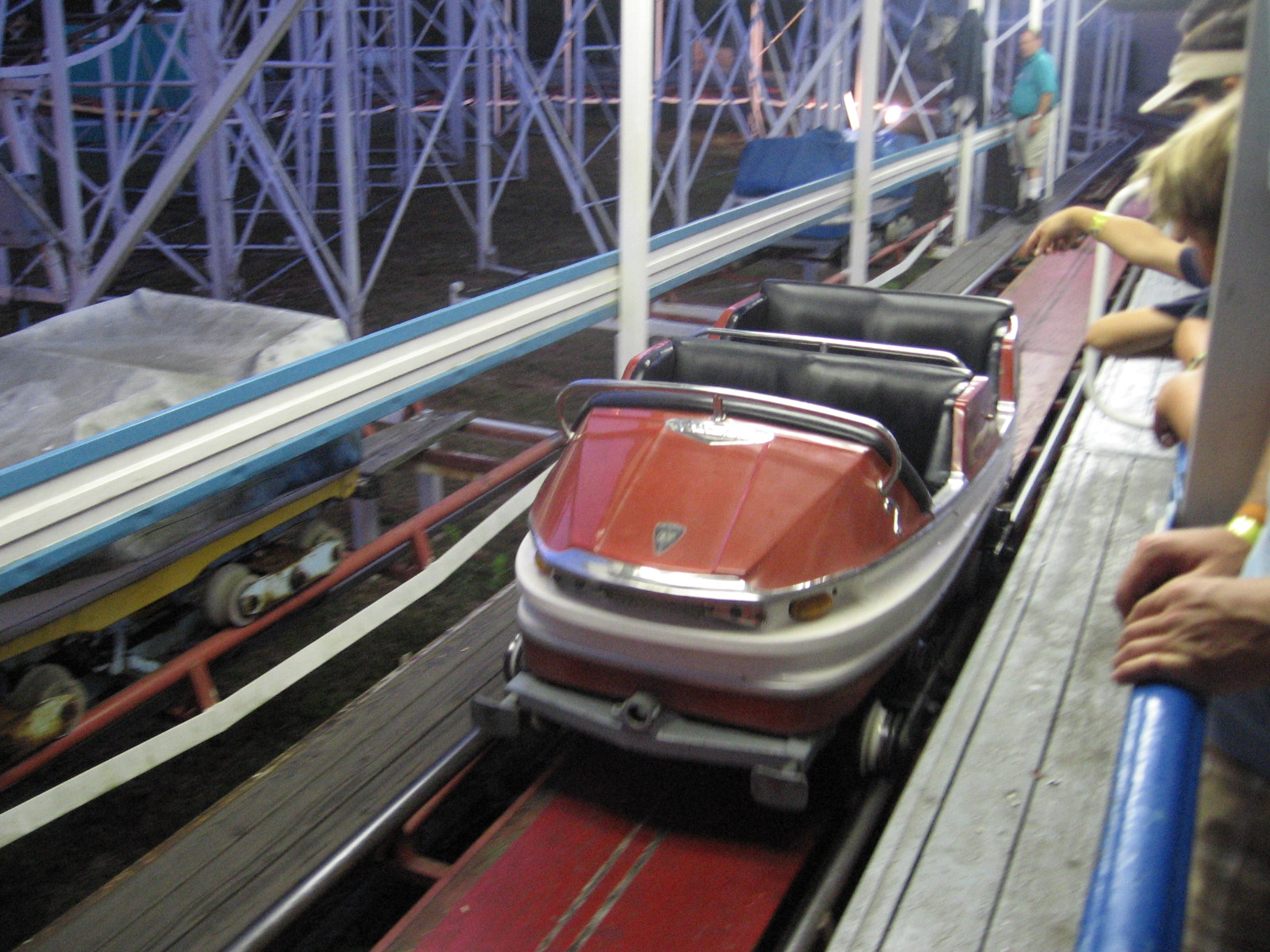
A car from Galaxi returning from the unload platform to be reloaded

Ride name	Ride Type	Year opened	Year closed	Notes
Balloon Flight	Spinning balloon ride	1984	1986	Removed to make way for Casino
Captain Isaiah Cutler's Haunted House	Funhouse	1967	1995	Closed due to high operational costs
Ferris Wheel	Ferris wheel	1975	2000	Replaced by Frog Hopper
Galaxi	Steel roller coaster (Galaxi)	1978	2008	Removed to make way for Wild Mouse
Giant Slide	Fun slide	1972	1986	
Hydrobumpers	Bumper cars	1967	1974	Replaced by Sock It To 'Em Bumper Cars
Hydrofighter	Water gun fight tower ride	1988	2000	Removed to make way for Dragon's Descent
Kartland Go-Karts	Go-karts	1967	2000 or 2002	
Luv Machine	Bayern Kurve	1975	1981	Removed to make way for Antique Cars
Noah Zark	Play area	1982	2000	
Paratrooper	Paratrooper	1982	1987	
UFO	Spinning ride	1972	1981	
Water Bugs Bumper Boats	Bumper boats	1984	1992	
Zipper	Zipper	1967	1974	

== See also ==
- List of amusement parks in the Americas
- List of amusement rides
- Palace Playland
