= Central Massachusetts =

Region of Massachusetts, US

- Region of Massachusetts
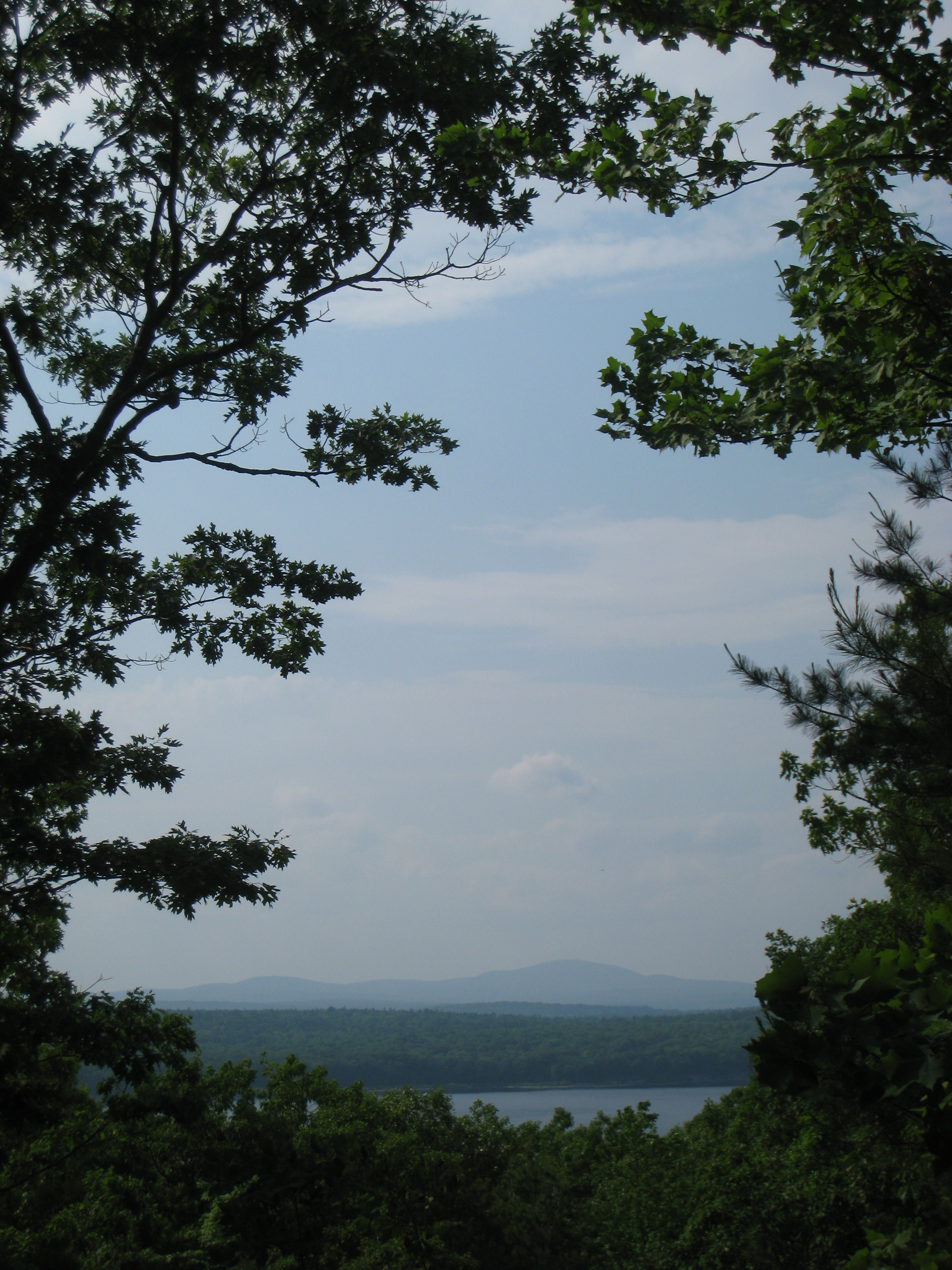
- View of Mount Wachusett from Tower Hill, Boylston

- Location in the United States
- Coordinates: 42°22′N 71°55′W
- Country: United States
- State: Massachusetts
- Counties: Worcester, Middlesex, Hampden, Hampshire, Norfolk, Franklin

Population
  - Estimate: 888,500−1,080,000
- Time zone: UTC−05:00 (EST)
  - Summer (DST): UTC−04:00 (EDT)
- Area codes: 508, 774, 413, 978, 351

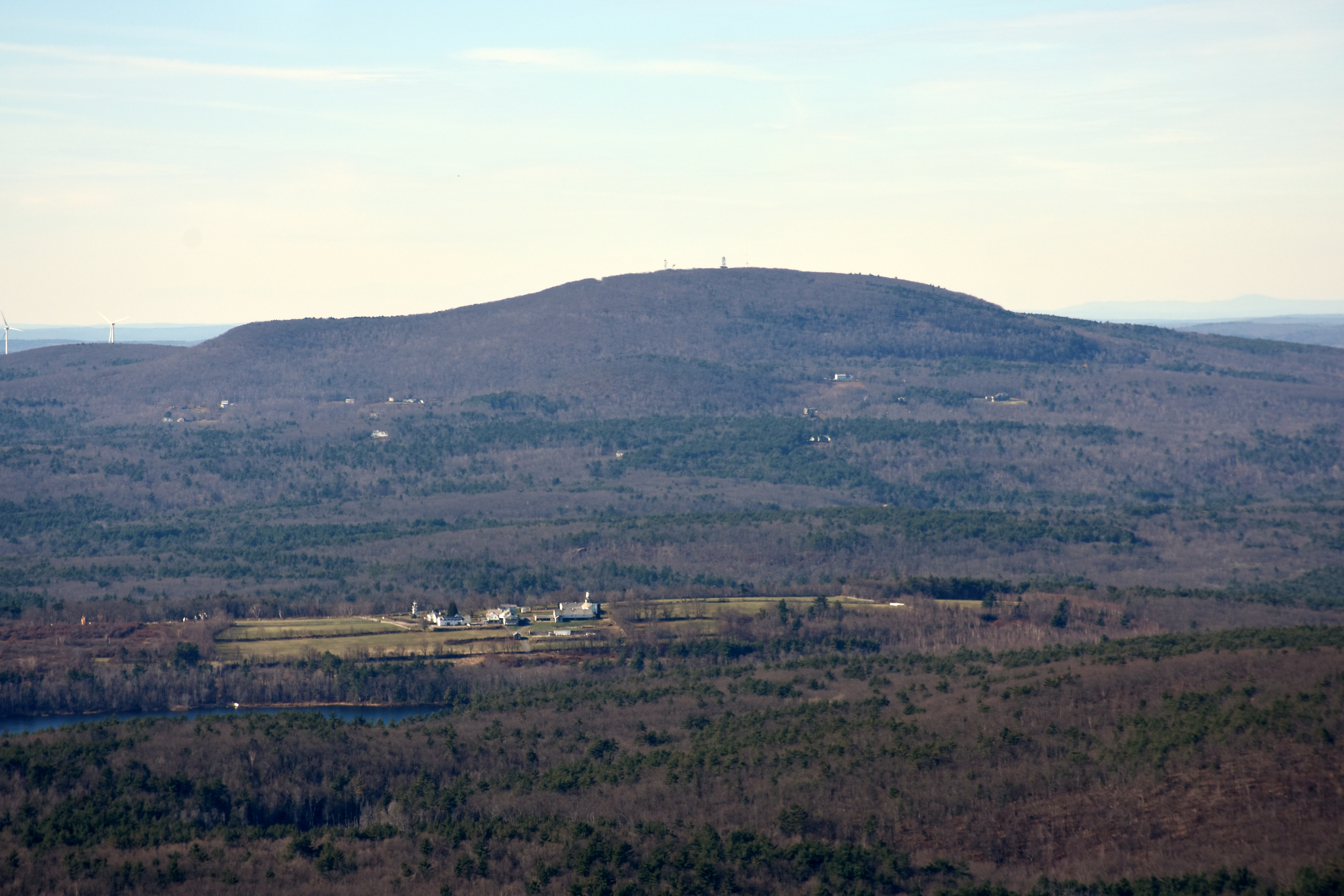
Aerial View of Mount Wachusett

Central Massachusetts is the geographically central region of Massachusetts. Though definitions vary, most include all of Worcester County and the northwest corner of Middlesex County.

Worcester, the largest city in the area, and the seat of Worcester County, is often considered the cultural capital of the region. Other populous cities include Fitchburg, Gardner, Leominster, and Marlborough.

== Geography ==
Central Massachusetts is bordered by New Hampshire to the north, Connecticut and Rhode Island to the south, the Pioneer Valley to the west, the Merrimack Valley to the northeast, and MetroWest to the east.

Much of Central Massachusetts is dominated by the Worcester-Mondanock Plateau; an upland plateau rising above the Connecticut River Valley to the west and coastal plains to the east. Due to its elevation, Central Massachusetts experiences colder winters than the areas to its east and west. The northeast and southeast corners of the region are not part of the Worcester-Monadnock Plateau; they lie within the Northeast Coastal Plain and Blackstone Complex ecoregions respectively.

The geography of Central Massachusetts has been shaped significantly by glacial activity during the Pleistocene epoch. The modern landscape is dominated by rolling hills and valleys, dotted with lakes and streams. Two notable monadnocks are present in North-Central Massachusetts– Mount Wachusett and Mount Watatic.

=== Human Impact ===
Prior to the arrival of European colonists, most of Central Massachusetts was covered by old growth forest. However, as European colonists overtook the land, much of it was deforested and used for agriculture. This trend continued through the mid 1800’s, when between 60% and 80% of New England’s land was used for agriculture. The mid-1800’s saw shifts in agriculture and settlement patterns in the United States; this led to the abandonment of many farms in the region. This led to increased forestation in the area– today the majority of land in Central Massachusetts is covered by forest.

Central Massachusetts contains man made bodies of water, such as mill ponds and reservoirs. Notable man made bodies of water include the Blackstone Canal, Wachusett Reservoir, Tully Lake, and Buffumville Lake.

== Communities ==
The following is a list of Central Massachusetts communities, though there is some debate regarding whether communities outside of Worcester County are considered part of Central Massachusetts.

Communities in Central Massachusetts
Name	Type	County	Population (2026)
Ashburnham	Town	Worcester	6574
Ashby	Town	Middlesex	3270
Athol	Town	Worcester	12151
Auburn	Town	Worcester	17572
Ayer	Town	Middlesex	9443
Barre	Town	Worcester	5652
Bellingham	Town	Norfolk	18201
Berlin	Town	Worcester	3489
Blackstone	Town	Worcester	9450
Bolton	Town	Worcester	7150
Boylston	Town	Worcester	5140
Brimfield	Town	Hampden	3750
Brookfield	Town	Worcester	3529
Charlton	Town	Worcester	13737
Clinton	Town	Worcester	15691
Douglas	Town	Worcester	9631
Dudley	Town	Worcester	11951
East Brookfield	Town	Worcester	2239
Fitchburg	City	Worcester	42121
Gardner	City	Worcester	21451
Grafton	Town	Worcester	21709
Groton	Town	Middlesex	11586
Hardwick	Town	Worcester	2752
Harvard	Town	Worcester	7010
Holden	Town	Worcester	20655
Holland	Town	Hampden	2576
Hopedale	Town	Worcester	6061
Hubbardston	Town	Worcester	4486
Hudson	Town	Middlesex	20323
Lancaster	Town	Worcester	9296
Leicester	Town	Worcester	11434
Leominster	City	Worcester	44134
Lunenburg	Town	Worcester	12058
Marlborough	City	Middlesex	43391
Mendon	Town	Worcester	6510
Milford	Town	Worcester	30810
Millbury	Town	Worcester	14363
Millville	Town	Worcester	3182
New Braintree	Town	Worcester	1017
North Brookfield	Town	Worcester	4787
Northborough	Town	Worcester	16072
Northbridge	Town	Worcester	16871
Oakham	Town	Worcester	1915
Orange	Town	Franklin	7560
Oxford	Town	Worcester	13514
Palmer	Town	Hampden	12373
Paxton	Town	Worcester	5041
Pepperell	Town	Middlesex	11745
Petersham	Town	Worcester	1240
Phillipston	Town	Worcester	1818
Princeton	Town	Worcester	3636
Royalston	Town	Worcester	1299
Rutland	Town	Worcester	9902
Shirley	Town	Middlesex	7363
Shrewsbury	Town	Worcester	39568
Southborough	Town	Worcester	10541
Southbridge	City	Worcester	18078
Spencer	Town	Worcester	12204
Sterling	Town	Worcester	8362
Stow	Town	Middlesex	7225
Sturbridge	Town	Worcester	10131
Sutton	Town	Worcester	9698
Templeton	Town	Worcester	8696
Townsend	Town	Middlesex	9124
Upton	Town	Worcester	8641
Uxbridge	Town	Worcester	14846
Wales	Town	Hampden	1838
Ware	Town	Hampshire	10187
Warren	Town	Worcester	5148
Webster	Town	Worcester	17833
West Boylston	Town	Worcester	7909
West Brookfield	Town	Worcester	3974
Westborough	Town	Worcester	23134
Westminster	Town	Worcester	8998
Winchendon	Town	Worcester	10635
Worcester	City	Worcester	215778

== Transportation ==
=== Highways and Major Roadways ===
The Massachusetts Turnpike (Interstate 90) runs through the southern part of Worcester County. Other interstate highways in the area are I-190, I-290, I-395, and I-495 on the eastern edge. Route 2 is another major east–west highway that spans the northern part of Worcester County. Other significant thoroughfares include Route 9, Route 146, and U.S. Route 20.

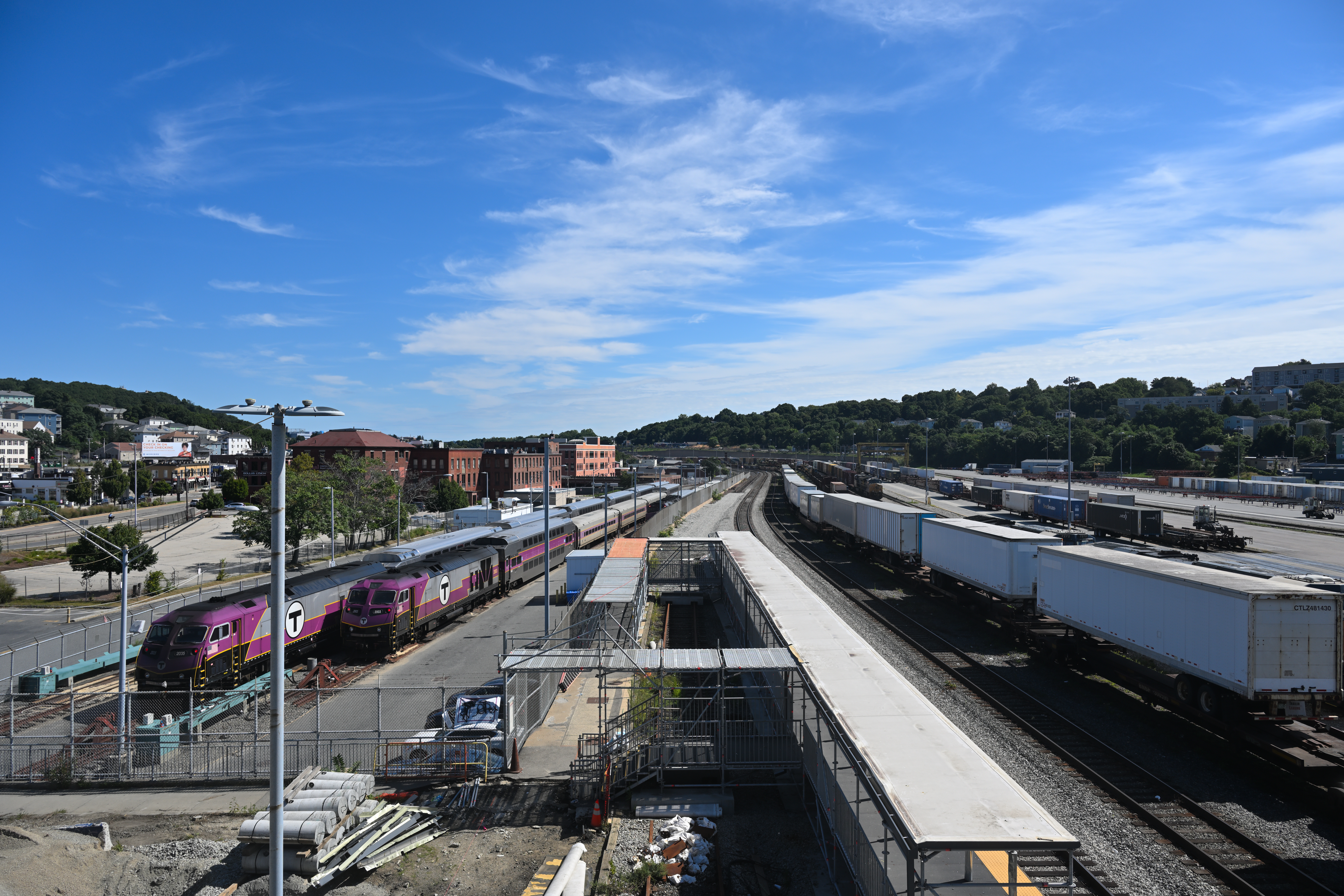
MBTA Layover and CSX Intermodal Terminal, Worcester

=== Rail ===
Central Massachusetts is served by two MBTA Commuter Rail lines providing service to Boston. The Fitchburg Line provides service to Boston’s North Station; its route runs roughly parallel to Massachusetts Route 2. The Worcester Line provides service to South Station; its route runs roughly parallel to Massachusetts Route 9.

Central Massachusetts is also served by Amtrak; the Lake Shore Limited line stops at Worcester’s Union Station.

Several freight rail lines run through Central Massachusetts. Primary carriers along these routes are CSX, Providence and Worcester Railroad, East Brookfield and Spencer Railroad, and the Grafton and Upton Railroad. Historically, passenger service was also available along some of these lines. The Grafton and Upton Railroad ran passenger service along its rails from 1889 to 1928.

=== Bus ===
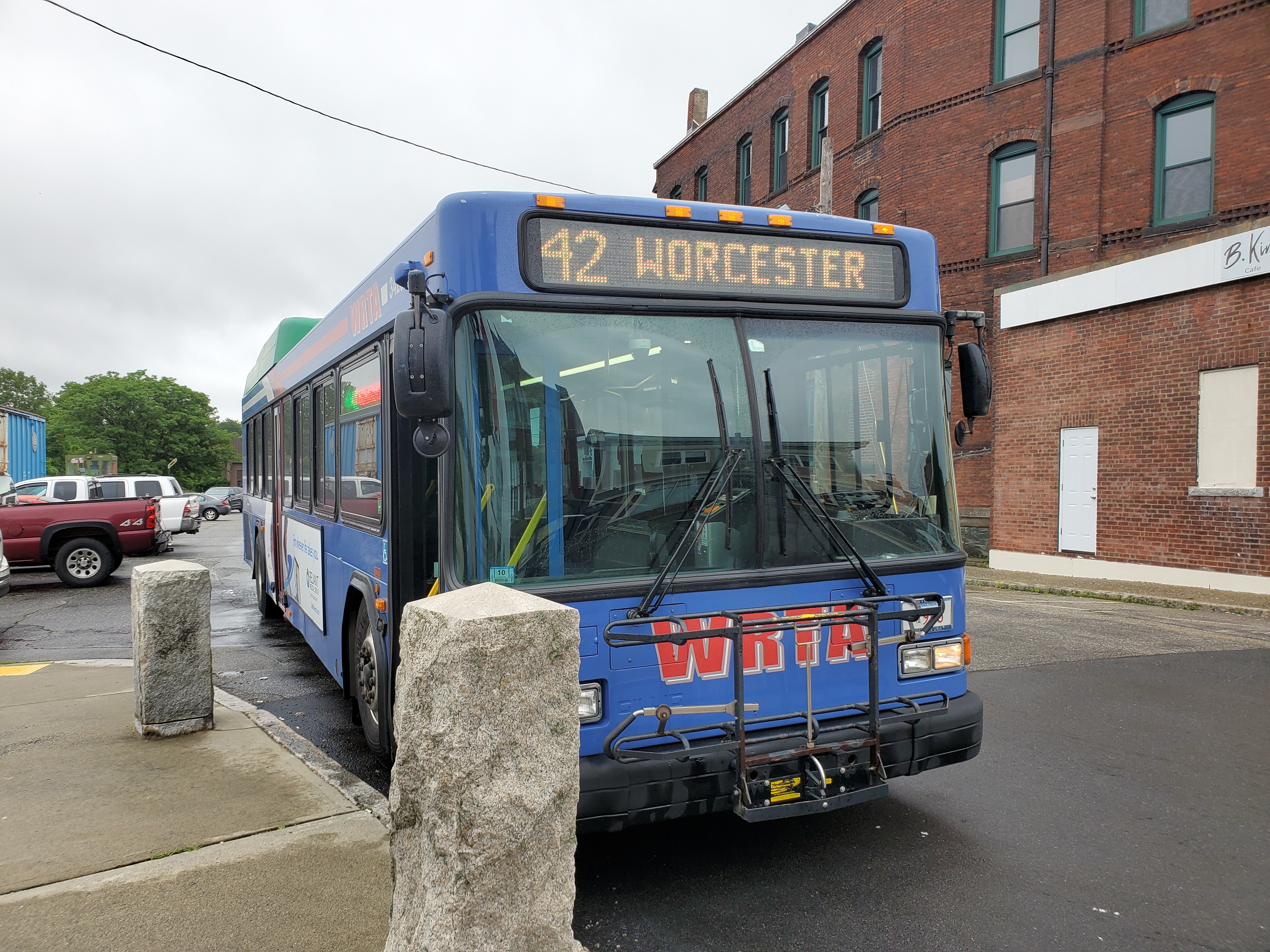
WRTA Bus

Local bus service is provided by several local transportation authorities.

The Worcester Regional Transit Authority (WRTA) serves the communities of Auburn, Berlin, Boylston, Brimfield, Brookfield, Charlton, Clinton, Douglas, Dudley, East Brookfield, Grafton, Holden, Holland, Leicester, Millbury, New Braintree, North Brookfield, Northborough, Northbridge, Oakham, Oxford, Paxton, Princeton, Rutland, Shrewsbury, Southbridge, Spencer, Sturbridge, Sutton, Wales, Warren, Webster, West Boylston, West Brookfield, Westborough, and Worcester.

The Montachusett Regional Transit Authority serves the communities of Ashburnham, Ashby, Athol, Ayer, Bolton, Boxborough, Fitchburg, Gardner, Hardwick, Harvard, Hubbardston, Lancaster, Leominster, Littleton, Lunenburg, Royalston, Shirley, Sterling, Stow, Templeton, Townsend, Westminster, and Winchendon.

Barre is served by both WRTA and MART. Phillipston is served by both MART and the Franklin Regional Transit Authority.

Despite these communities being served by local transportation authorities, many communities lack fixed bus routes and are largely inaccessible by public transportation. Fixed bus routes serve the communities of Athol, Auburn, Charlton, Dudley, East Brookfield, Fitchburg, Gardner, Grafton, Leicester, Leominster, Lunenburg, Millbury, Northbridge, Oxford, Phillipston, Shrewsbury, Spencer, Southbridge,Templeton, Webster, West Boylston, Westminster, Winchendon, and Worcester.

Intercity bus service in the region is provided by several carriers; Peter Pan, Flixbus, and Greyhound being the primary carriers. Intercity bus lines serve Athol, Ayer, Fitchburg, Sturbridge, and Worcester.

=== Air ===
Worcester Regional Airport offers regular flights to New York City, Fort Lauderdale, Orlando, and Philadelphia.

The region is served by several smaller airfields; however, these do not offer regular commercial flights.

Airports in Central Massachusetts
Name	Location	Airport Type	ICAO	IATA	FAA LID
Fitchburg Municipal Airport	Fitchburg	Public	KFIT	none	FIT
Gardner Municipal Airport	Gardner	Public	KGDM	GDM	GDM
Hopedale Industrial Park Airport	Hopedale	Private	K1B6	none	1B6
Minute Man Air Field	Stow	Private	MMN	none	6B6
Orange Municipal Airport	Orange	Public	KORE	none	ORE
Southbridge Municipal Airport	Southbridge	Public	none	none	3B0
Spencer Airport	Spencer	Public	K60M	none	60M
Sterling Airport	Sterling	Public	none	none	3B3
Ware Airport	Ware	Private	none	none	MA53
Worcester Regional Airport	Worcester	Public	KORH	ORH	ORH

=== Water ===
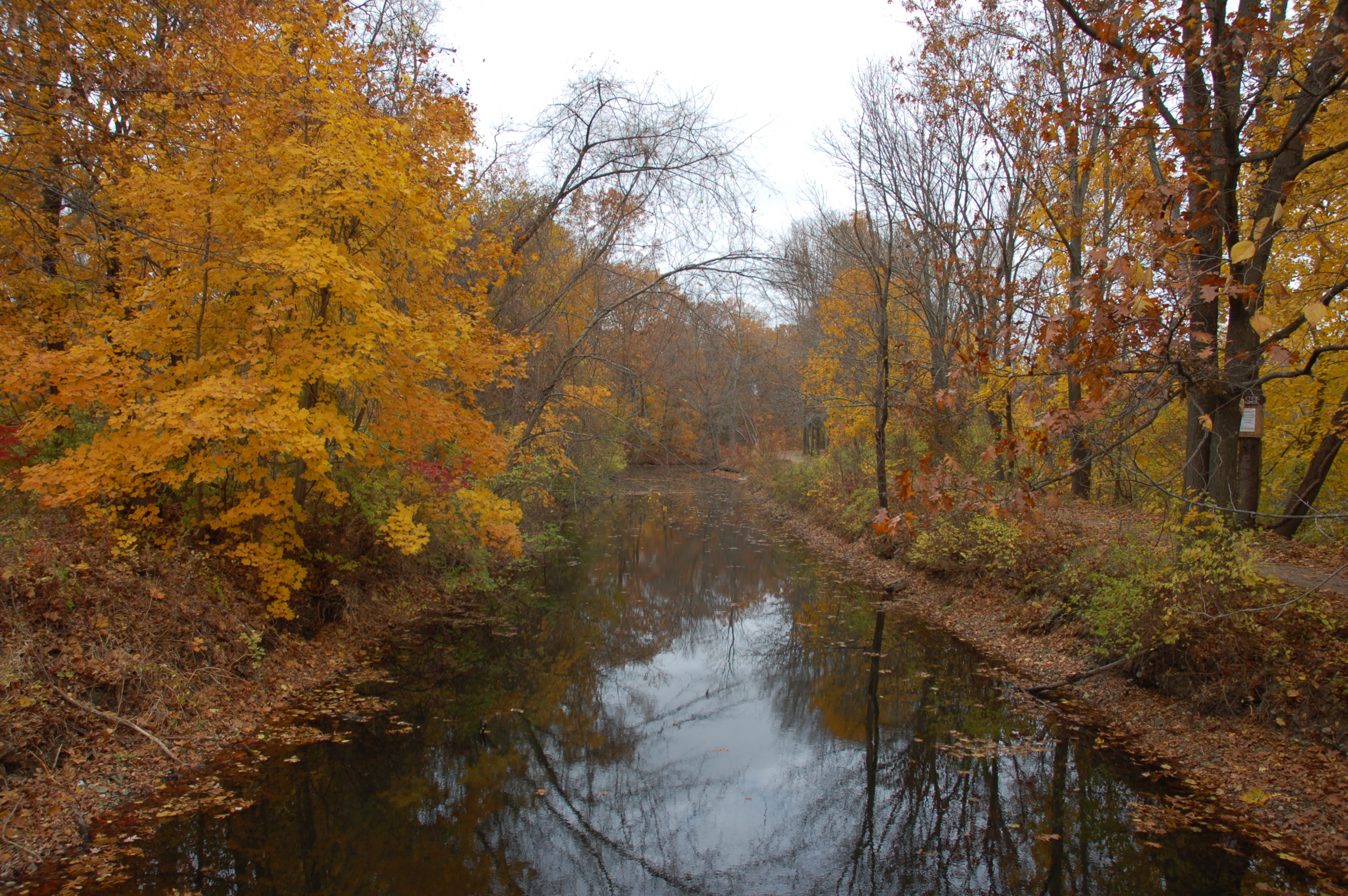
Blackstone Canal, Uxbridge

The Blackstone Canal was a historic canal running between Worcester and Providence, Rhode Island. It served as an important transportation route between communities of the Blackstone Valley. When the canal opened in 1828, it offered a faster, easier, and less expensive option to transport goods than previous land routes. This helped spur trade and industrialization in canal communities. Faced with fierce competition from railroads, the canal ceased operations in 1848.

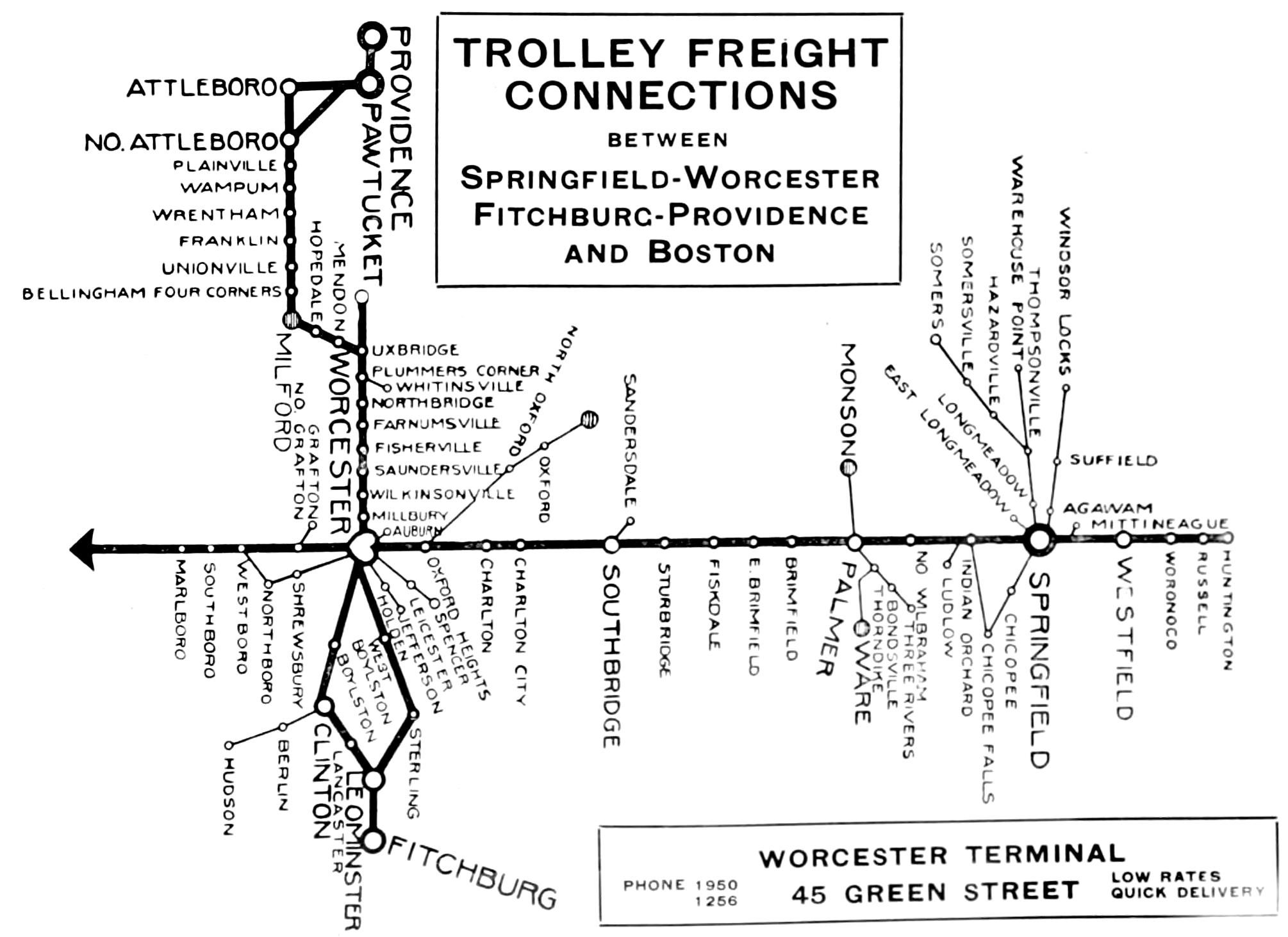
1915 Advertisement by the Boston and Worcester Street Railway

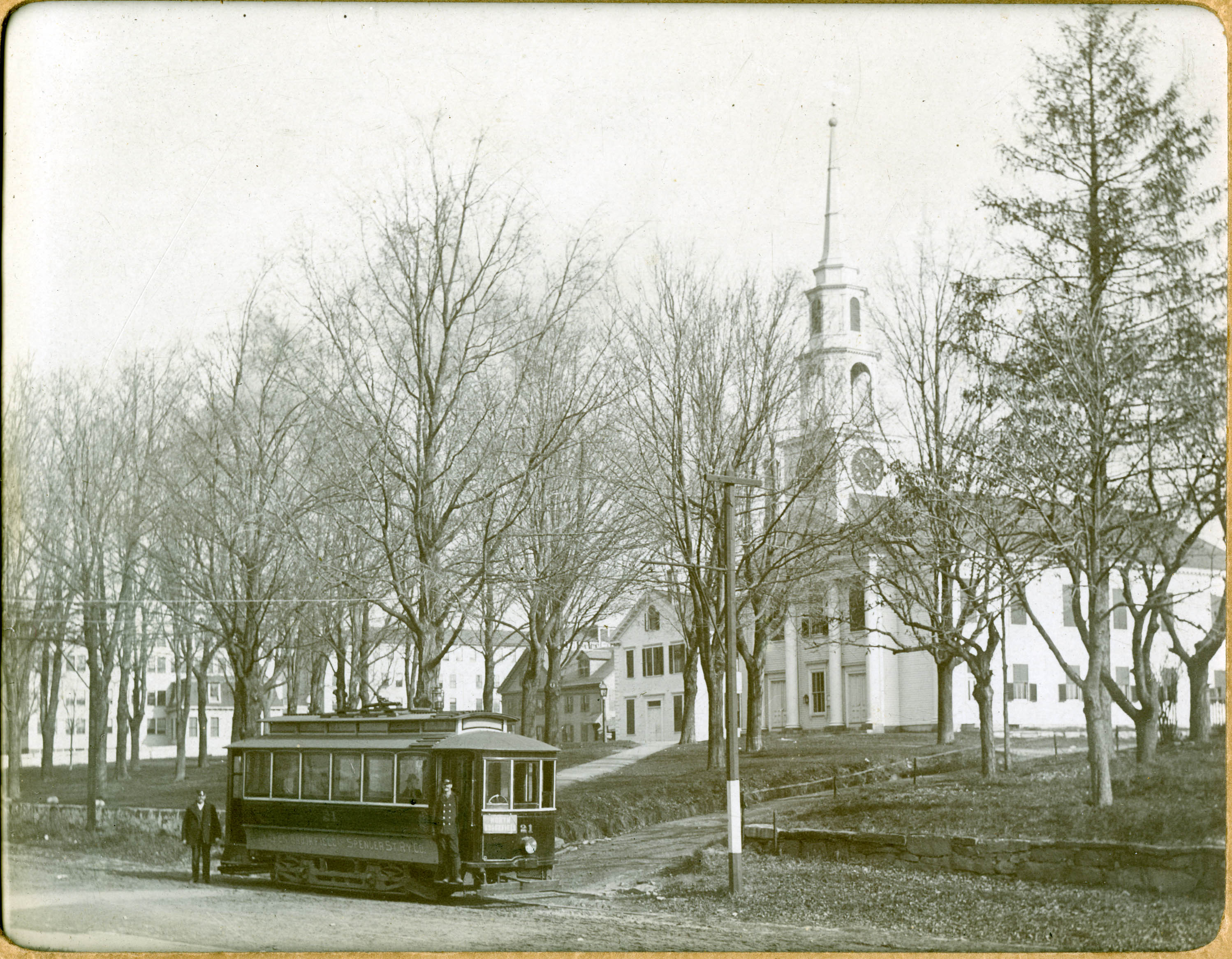
Ware, Brookfield & Spencer Street Railway Co. Trolley, North Brookfield MA,1899.

=== Streetcars and Trolleys ===
Central Massachusetts was once home to an extensive streetcar network, carrying passengers and freight between Central Massachusetts communities and neighboring areas, including Connecticut, Rhode Island, Southern Vermont, New Hampshire, Western Massachusetts, and Boston. Service was initially provided by horse drawn streetcars, but was replaced by electrified streetcars beginning in the late 1800's.

Streetcar use peaked during the first quarter of the 20th century, but rapidly declined as automobiles became more common, leading to the demise of the region's streetcar service. Some streetcar lines were replaced by bus service, others were simply abandoned.

Several carriers operated streetcars in the region, including the Milford and Uxbridge Street Railway, Worcester Consolidated Street Railway, Warren, Brookfield and Spencer Street Railway, and Springfield Street Railway.

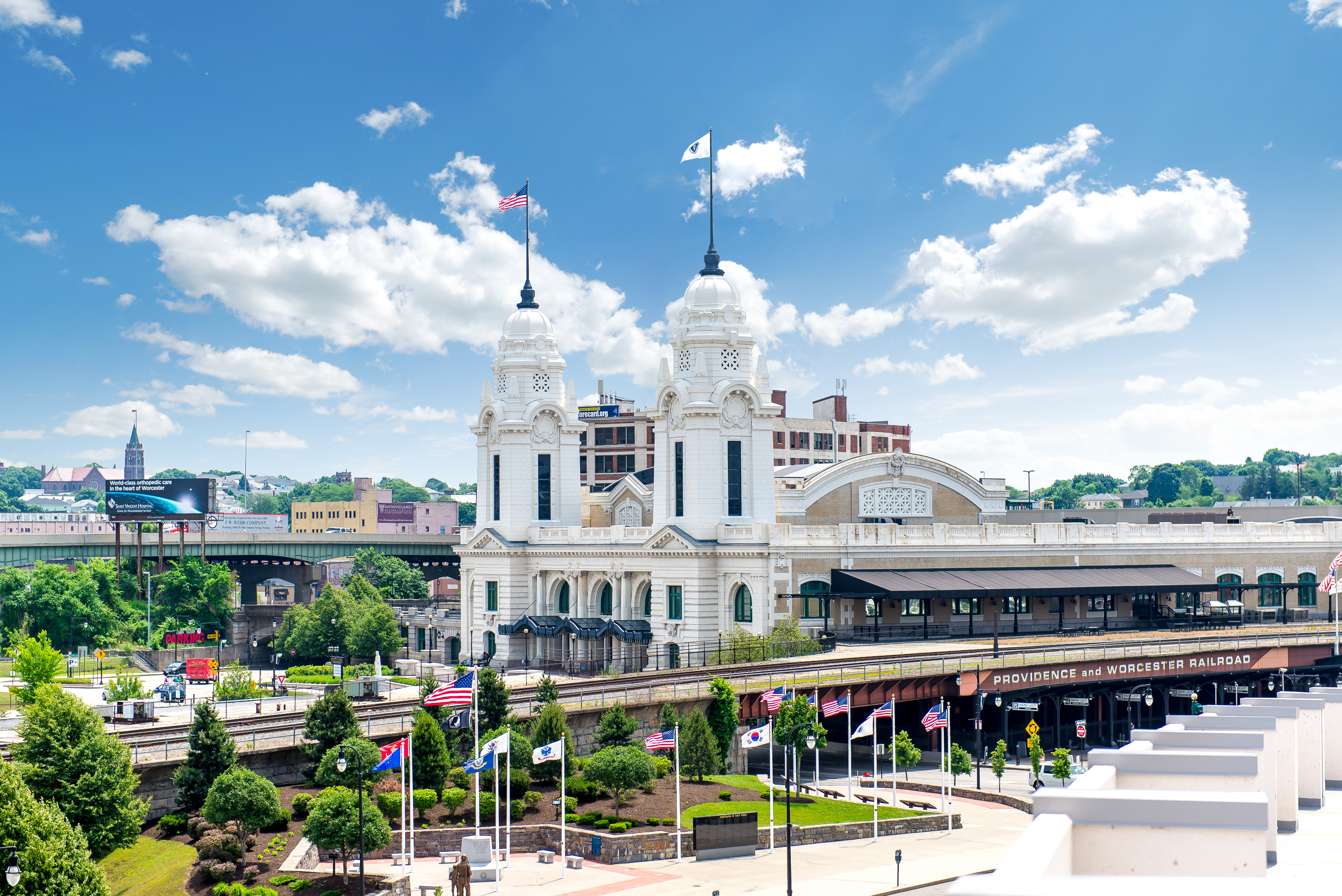
Worcester Union Station

=== Transportation Hubs ===
Worcester’s Union Station serves as a major transit hub in the region. Union Station offers rail service through MBTA and Amtrak; serves as the main bus hub for the WRTA system; and is a stop along several intercity bus routes.

== Education ==
Central Massachusetts is home to eleven colleges and universities.

Colleges and Universities in Central Massachusetts
Name	Location	Type	Enrollment (2025-2026)
Assumption University	Worcester	Private not-for-profit	2037
Clark University	Worcester	Private not-for-profit	3925
College of the Holy Cross	Worcester	Private not-for-profit	3126
Fitchburg State University	Fitchburg	Public	5892
Massachusetts College of Pharmacy and Health Sciences	Worcester	Private not-for-profit	2000 (approx.)
Mount Wachusett Community College	Gardner	Public	3694
Nichols College	Dudley	Private not-for-profit	1392
Quinsigamond Community College	Worcester	Public	7811
University of Massachusetts Chan Medical School	Worcester	Public	1489
Worcester Polytechnic Institute	Worcester	Private not-for-profit	7584
Worcester State University	Worcester	Public	5745

== Economy ==
Central Massachusetts features a diversified economy, with industries including pharmaceutical research and production, finance, education, manufacturing, medical, agriculture, and hospitality helping to form the region's modern economy. The rate of college educated adults is above the national average, leading to a sizeable skilled workforce. The cost of living in Central Massachusetts is above the US national average, but lower than the neighboring Boston/MetroWest region.

== Recreation ==
=== Outdoor Recreation ===
Central Massachusetts offers various outdoor recreation opportunities. The region contains many public trail systems, freshwater swimming areas, public parks, sports fields, camping areas, and bodies of water suitable for fishing and boating.

==== State Parks, Forests, and Recreation Areas ====
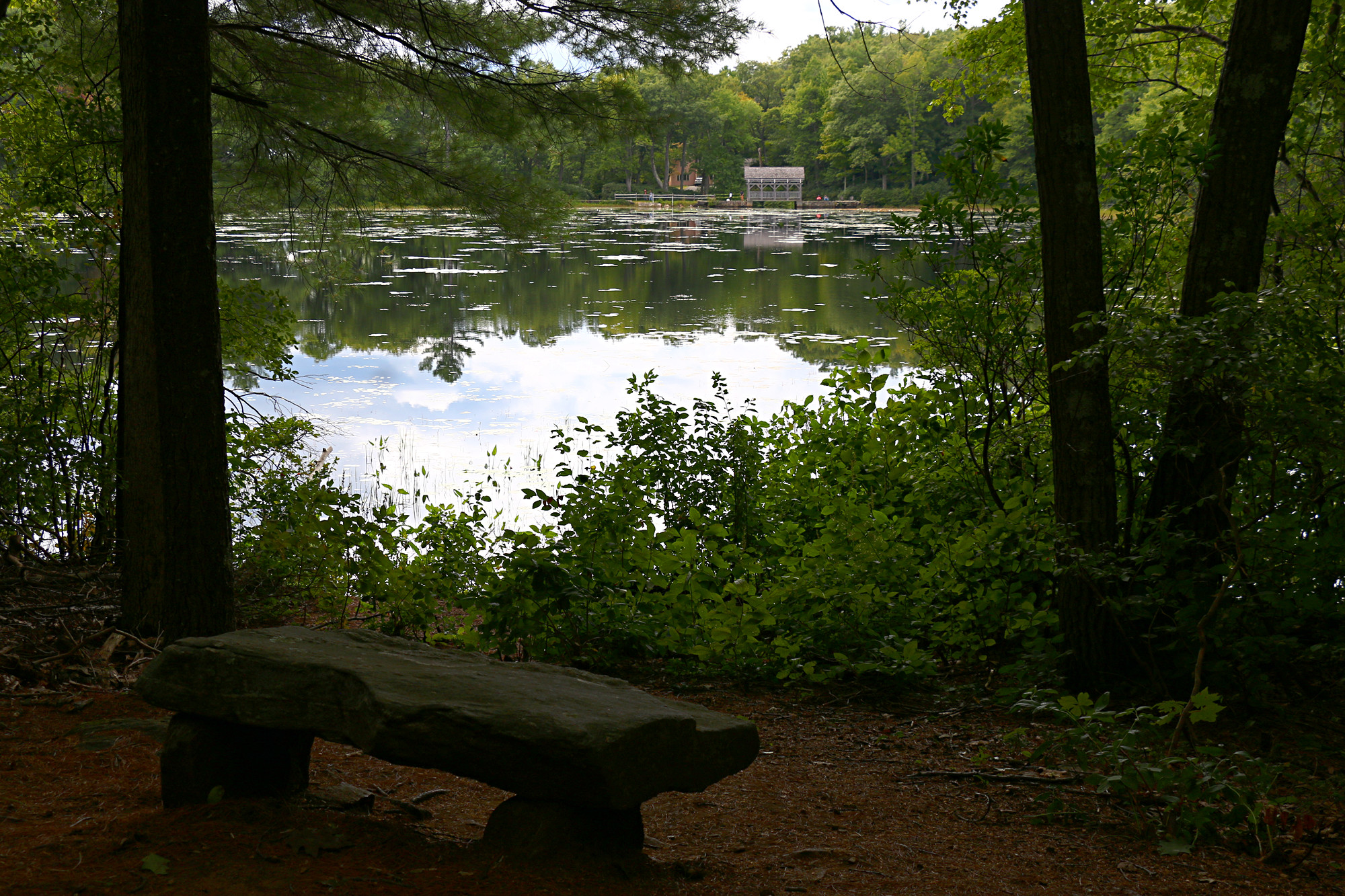
Moore State Park, Paxton

Central Massachusetts is home to several state parks, state forests, and recreation areas.

State Parks, Forests, and Recreation Areas in Central Massachusetts
Name	Type	Location
Blackstone River and Canal State Heritage Park	State Park	Uxbridge
Brimfield State Forest	State Forest	Brimfield, Monson, Wales
Douglas State Forest	State Forest	Douglas
Dunn State Park	State Park	Gardner
Lake Dennison Recreation Area	State Recreation Area	Templeton
Leominster State Forest	State Forest	Fitchburg, Leominster, Princeton, Sterling, Westminster
Moore State Park	State Park	Paxton
Otter River State Forest	State Forest	Royalston, Templeton, Winchendon
Purgatory Chasm State Reservation	State Reservation	Sutton
Rutland State Park	State Park	Barre, Rutland, Oakham
Quinsigamond State Park	State Park	Worcester
Spencer State Forest	State Forest	Spencer
Wachusett Mountain State Reservation	State Reservation	Princeton, Westminster
Upton State Forest	State Forest	Upton, Westborough
Willard Brook State Forest	State Forest	Ashby, Fitchburg,Lunenberg,Townsend
Wells State Park	State Park	Sturbridge

===== Notable Trail Systems =====
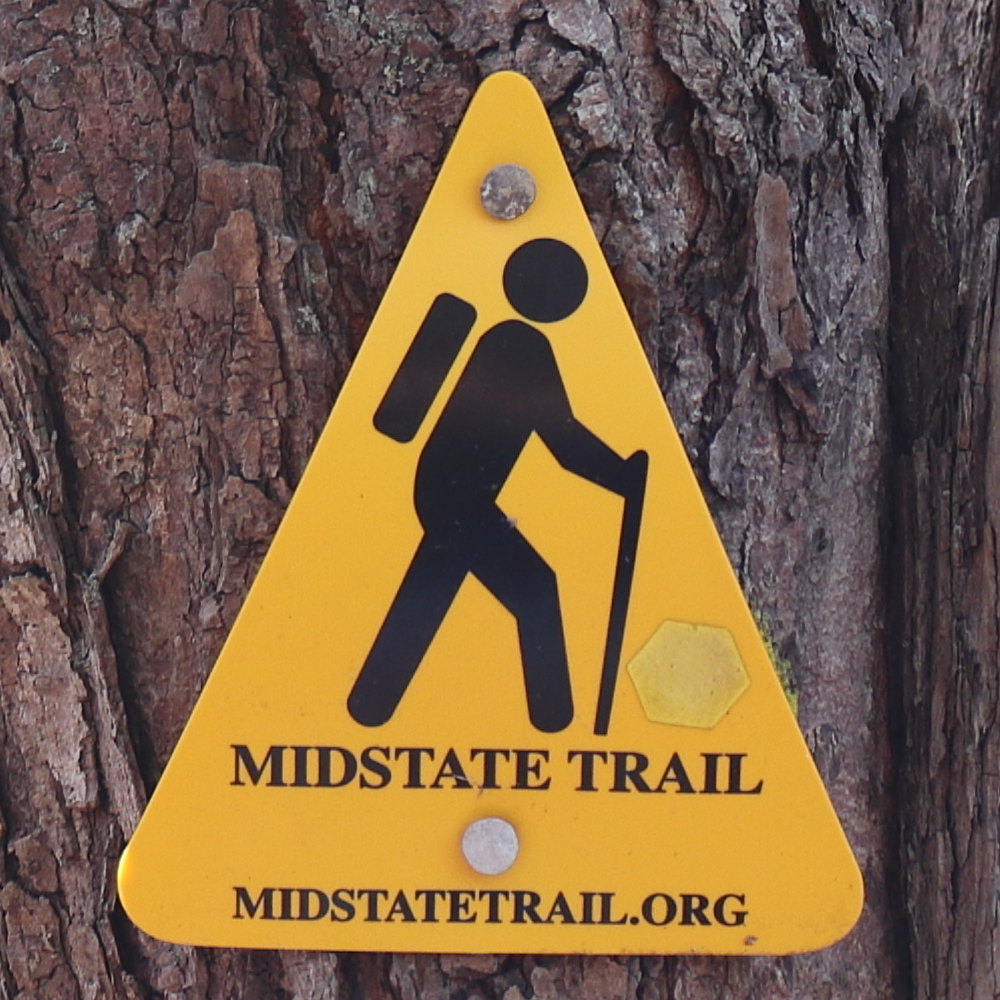
Midstate Trail Blaze

Central Massachusetts features several long distance recreation trails.

The Midstate Trail is a 92 mile (148km) hiking trail, running north-south through the region. It passes through the communities of Ashby, Ashburnham, Westminster, Princeton, Hubbardston, Barre, Rutland, Oakham,Lecister, Spencer, Charlton, Oxford, Sutton, and Douglas. Its northern terminus is on the Massachusetts-New Hampshire border, where it connects to the Wapack Trail. Its southern terminus is on the Massachusetts-Rhode Island border where it connects to the North-South Trail. Notable sights along the Midstate Trail include Mount Watatic, Mount Wachusett, Crow Hill, Wachusett Meadows, Redemption Rock, Sampson's Pebble, and Barre Falls Dam. The Midstate Trail connects with the Southern New England Trunkline Trail in Douglas.

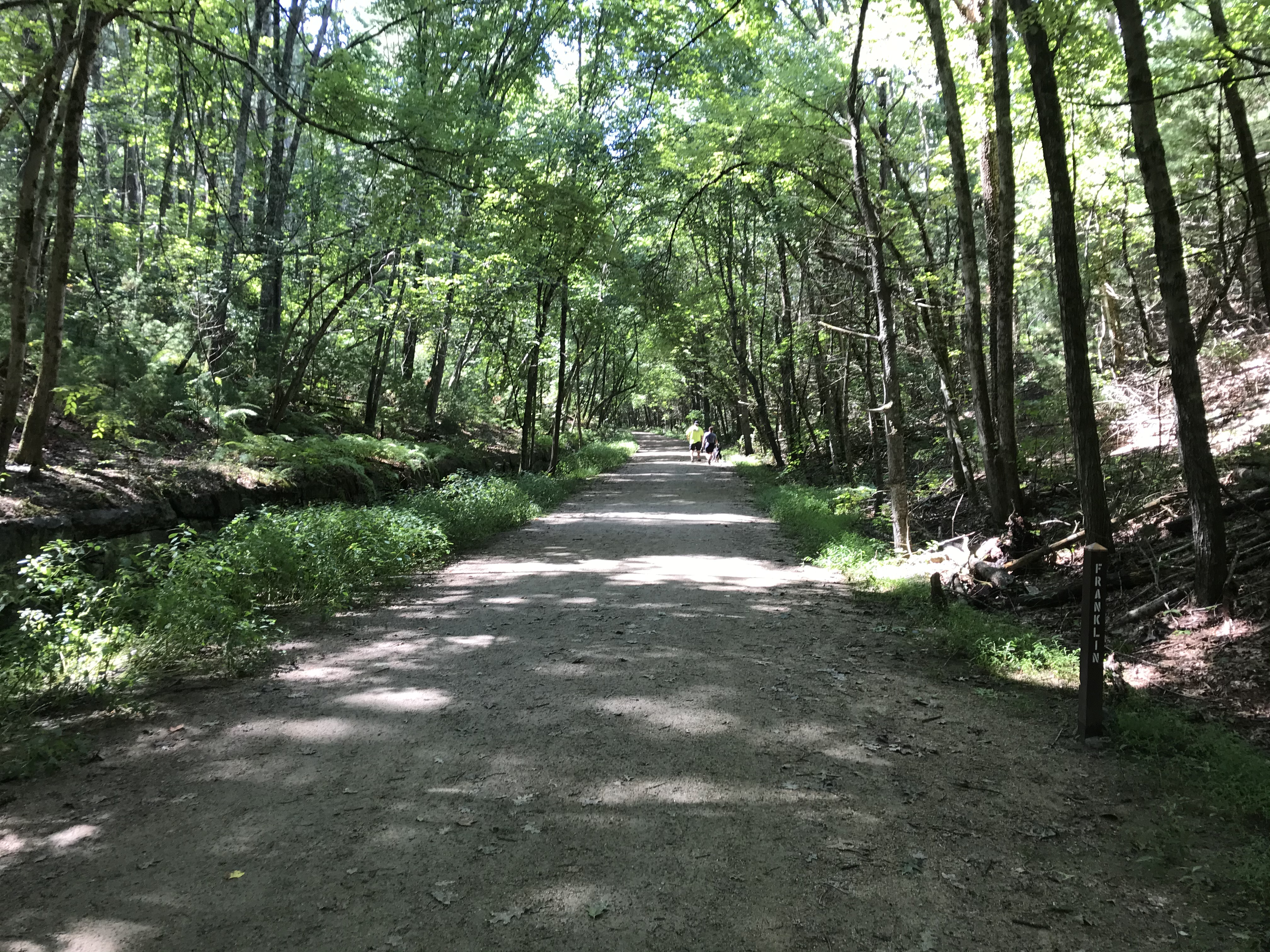
Southern New England Trunkline Trail, Bellingham Massachusetts

The Southern New England Trunkline Trail s a 22 mile (35km) east-west rail trail in the southern part of the region. The trail is used for hiking, cycling and mountain biking, snowshoeing, cross-country skiing, and horseback riding. The trail passes through the communities of Franklin, Bellingham, Blackstone, Millville, Uxbridge, and Douglas. The trail is mostly a gravel surface, though a 3.7 mile (6km) portion in Blackstone, Millville, and Uxbridge is paved. The paved section is part of both the Southern New England Trunkline Trail and the Blackstone River Greenway. The Southern New England Trunkline Trail's western terminus connects to the Air Line State Park Trail at the Massachusetts-Connecticut border.

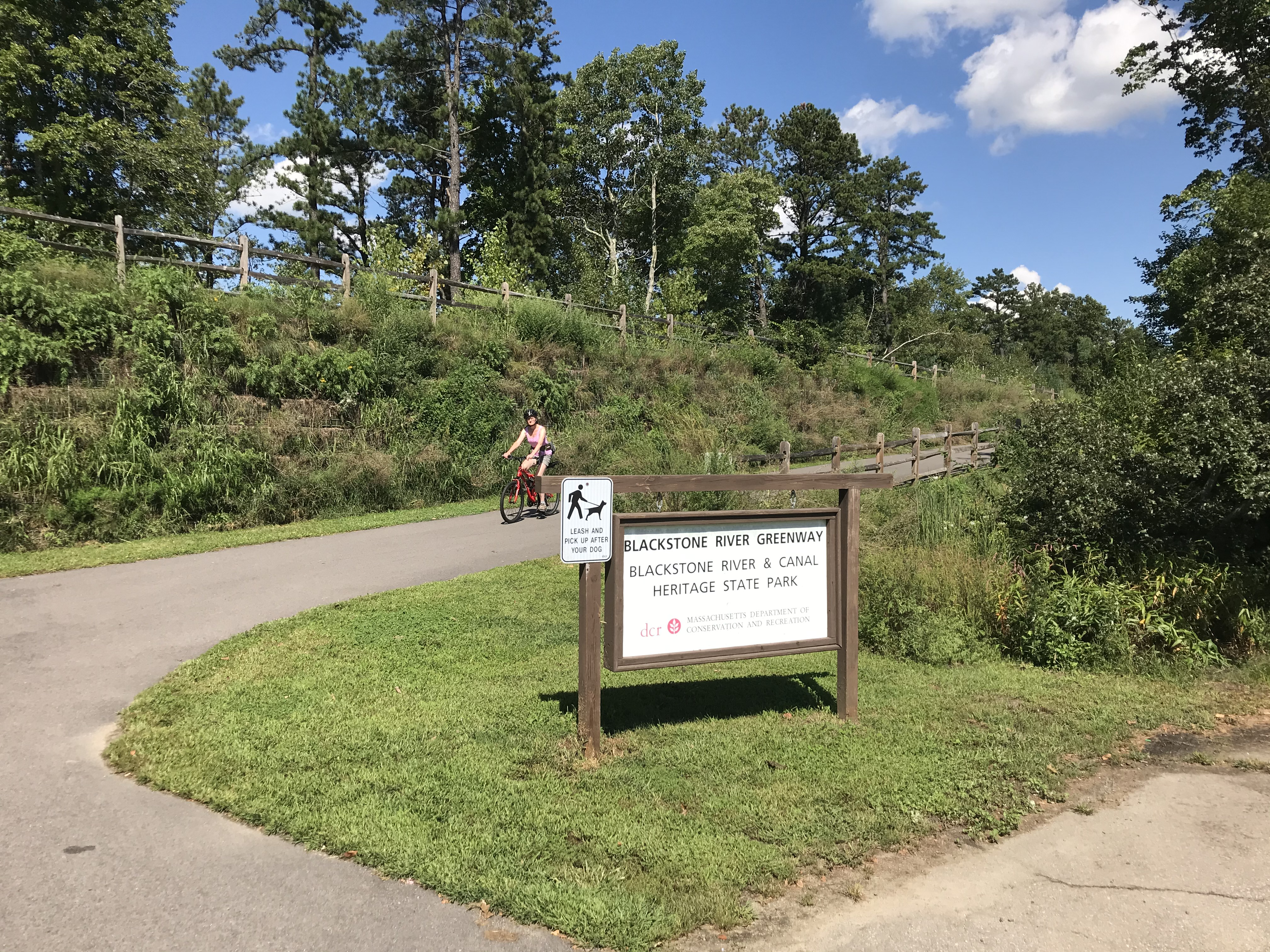
Blackstone River Greenway, Uxbridge, Massachusetts

The Blackstone River Greenway is a multi-use path currently under development. The completed path will be fully paved. Its route will parallel the Blackstone River for 48 miles (77km), connecting Worcester to Providence, Rhode Island. The greenway is part of the larger East Coast Greenway-- a national recreation trail under development; once completed, the trail will span approximately 3000 miles (4828km), connecting Maine to Florida.

The Massachusetts Central Rail Trail is a rail trail that is currently under development. The completed trail will run 104 miles (167km) east-west through Massachusetts, connecting Amherst to Boston. As of June 2026, over 60 miles of the trail are completed.

The Grand Trunk Trail is another rail trail currently under development, with three sections completed as of July 2026. The final trail will connect the communities of Brimfield, Sturbridge, and Southbridge.

Mount Wachusett and Mount Watatic are popular hiking spots. Both offer expansive views from their bald summits; on clear days, the view from these summits includes the Boston skyline, Mount Greylock, Mount Monadnock, the Wapack Range, the Belknap Range, and Vermont.

==== Water Recreation ====
Freshwater swimming is available in many ponds and lakes throughout the region. Public beaches, generally managed by either the Massachusetts Department of Conservation and Recreation or by individual municipalities, exist throughout the region. Additionally, there are some private freshwater beaches that may be accessed for a fee.

Recreational boating, including motorized boats, paddling, and sailing, is a popular summertime activity in many of the regions waterways. Popular boating spots include Lake Quinsigamond and Webster Lake.

The region boasts many fishing spots, including Wachusett Reservoir and the Squannacook River.

==== Winter Recreation ====
Central Massachusetts is home to two skiing areas-- Ski Ward in Shrewsbury and Wachusett Mountain Ski Area in Princeton. Both offer groomed downhill slopes for skiing and snowboarding, as well as snowtubing. Historically, additional ski areas existed in the region, but are now derfunct-- Ski Watatic in Ashby; Benjamin Hill in Shirley; Jericho Ski Area in Marlborough; and Pine Ridge Snow Park in Barre.

Outdoor ice skating is offered seasonally at the Worcester Common Oval, a 12000 square foot (1115 square meter) ice rink behind Worcester City Hall.

Sledding remains a popular winter activity in the area; most sledding occurs in public parks, fields, golf courses, and university campuses.

== Arts and Culture ==
=== Cultural Institutions ===
Central Massachusetts is home to a variety of cultural institutions, including museums, galleries, and theaters.

==== Museums ====
Museums in Central Massachusetts
Name	Location	Museum Type
American Heritage Museum	Hudson	History Museum
Artemas Ward Museum	Shrewsbury	Historic House Museum
Blackstone Historical Museum	Blackstone	History Museum
Bullard House	Berlin	History Museum
Clara Barton Homestead	Oxford	Historic House Museum
District Five Schoolhouse	Webster	History Museum
District No. 5 School	Shrewsbury	History Museum
EcoTarium	Worcester	Science Museum
Fisher Museum	Petersham	Natural History Museum
Fitchburg Art Museum	Fitchburg	Art Museum
Fruitlands Museum	Harvard	History Museum
The Icon Museum and Study Center	Clinton	Art Museum
Major Taylor Museum	Worcester	History Museum
Massachusetts State Police Museum and Learning Center	Northbridge	History Museum
Memorial Hall	Milford	History Museum
Museum of Worcester	Worcester	History Museum
Old Sturbridge Village	Sturbridge	Living History Museum
Reed Homestead	Townsend	Historic House Museum
Salisbury Mansion	Worcester	Historic House Museum
Samuel Slater Experience	Webster	History Museum
Still River Meetinghouse	Harvard	History Museum
Waters Farm	Sutton	Historic House Museum
Willard House and Clock Museum	Grafton	Historic House Museum
Worcester Art Museum	Worcester	Art Museum

==== Performing Arts ====
Central Massachusetts features many performing arts venues, including the Hanover Theater, DCU Center, Mechanics Hall, The Palladium, Ralph's Diner, Indian Ranch, Calliope Theater, The Center at Eagle Hill, Grandview Playhouse, and the New Player's Theater Guild Center for the Performing Arts.

==== Other Cultural Institutions ====
Below is a list of other notable cultural institutions in the region.

- Worcester Center for Crafts
- American Antiquarian Society
- Tower Hill Botanic Garden
- Southwick's Zoo

== See also ==
- Western Massachusetts
- Montachusett-North County
- South County
- Worcester County
- Worcester-Mondanock Plateau
- Lake Chargoggagoggmanchauggagoggchaubunagungamaugg, the longest geographical name in the United States.
