= Mid State Trail =

Mid State Trail may refer to the following trails in the US:

- Midstate Trail (Massachusetts)
- Mid State Trail (Pennsylvania)
