= Rutland State Park =

State park in Rutland, Massachusetts, USA

- Location within Massachusetts Location within the United States
- Location: Rutland, Massachusetts, United States
- Coordinates: 42°22′14″N 71°59′07″W
- Area: 300 acres (120 ha)
- Elevation: 833 ft (254 m)
- Administrator: Massachusetts Department of Conservation and Recreation
- Website: Official website

Rutland State Park is a 300-acre (121ha) recreation area located in the town of Rutland, Massachusetts, United States. The park is managed by the Massachusetts Department of Conservation and Recreation (DCR). Much of the conservation land abutting the park is colloquially referred to as Rutland State Park, including Barre Falls and parts of Oakham and Hubbardston.

== Activities and Amenities ==
Amenities include picnic areas and a picnic pavilion, restrooms, grills, a freshwater beach, and a boat ramp at Whitehall Pond. The park is designated for day use, camping is prohibited.

The park has trails suitable for hiking, cycling, horseback riding, cross country skiing, and mountain biking. The park's trail system incorporates dirt roads predating the area's use as a park; these roads are often in poor condition for vehicular traffic, but offer wide, clear, relatively flat pathways for walking, horseback riding, and cycling.

Rutland State Park is directly connected to two long-distance trails — the Massachusetts Central Rail Trail and the Midstate Trail. The Massachusetts Central Rail Trail passes through the park's southern end, and the Midstate Trail passes through its western edge.

The park is suitable for birding. It is home to a variety of bird species, including great horned owl, barred owl, northern saw-whet owl, American woodcock, red tailed hawk, ruffled grouse, American kestrel, scarlet tanager, indigo bunting, and goldfinch.

Swimming, boating, and fishing are permitted at Whitehall Pond; motorized boats are prohibited. The pond is stocked with trout in April and May. Bass, pickerel, yellow perch, and bluegills are among the fish species present in Whitehall Pond. Aquatic invasive species are present in Whitehall Pond; efforts to remove invasive aquatic species are being managed by DCR. Whitehall Pond features shallow waters, with a maximum depth of approximately 5 feet (1.5m).

Hunting is permitted seasonally within the park.
