= Quinsigamond River =

River in Massachusetts, United States

Coordinates: 42.182°N 71.690°W

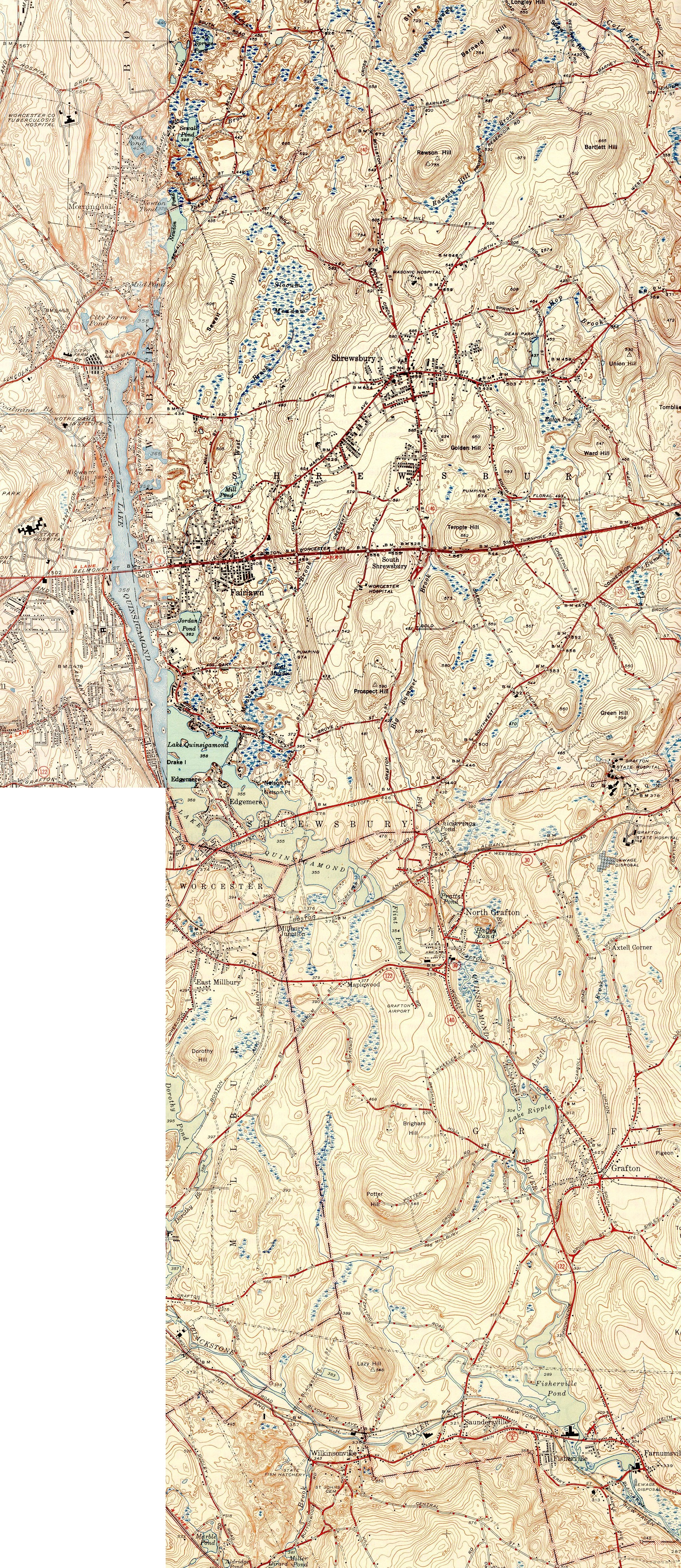
Quinsigamond River and environs

The Quinsigamond River is a river in central Massachusetts. It is a tributary of the Blackstone River and ultimately drains into Narragansett Bay.

Although the Quinsigamond has many small tributaries and drains a sizable area, the river proper is only 5.6 miles (9.0 km) long. It flows roughly southwards from its origin at Lake Quinsigamond at Worcester's eastern edge, past North Grafton where Bummet Brook enters, through Lake Ripple northwest of Grafton, and into Fisherville Pond at Fisherville, where it merges into the Blackstone River.

== Mandaean ritual use ==
The Mandaean-American community of Worcester regularly performs masbuta (baptism) rituals in Lake Quinsigamond, which is the source of the Quinsigamond River.

== See also ==
- List of rivers of Massachusetts
