= Hodges Village Dam =

Dam in Worcester County, Massachusetts, United States

Coordinates: 42°07′12″N 71°52′46″W

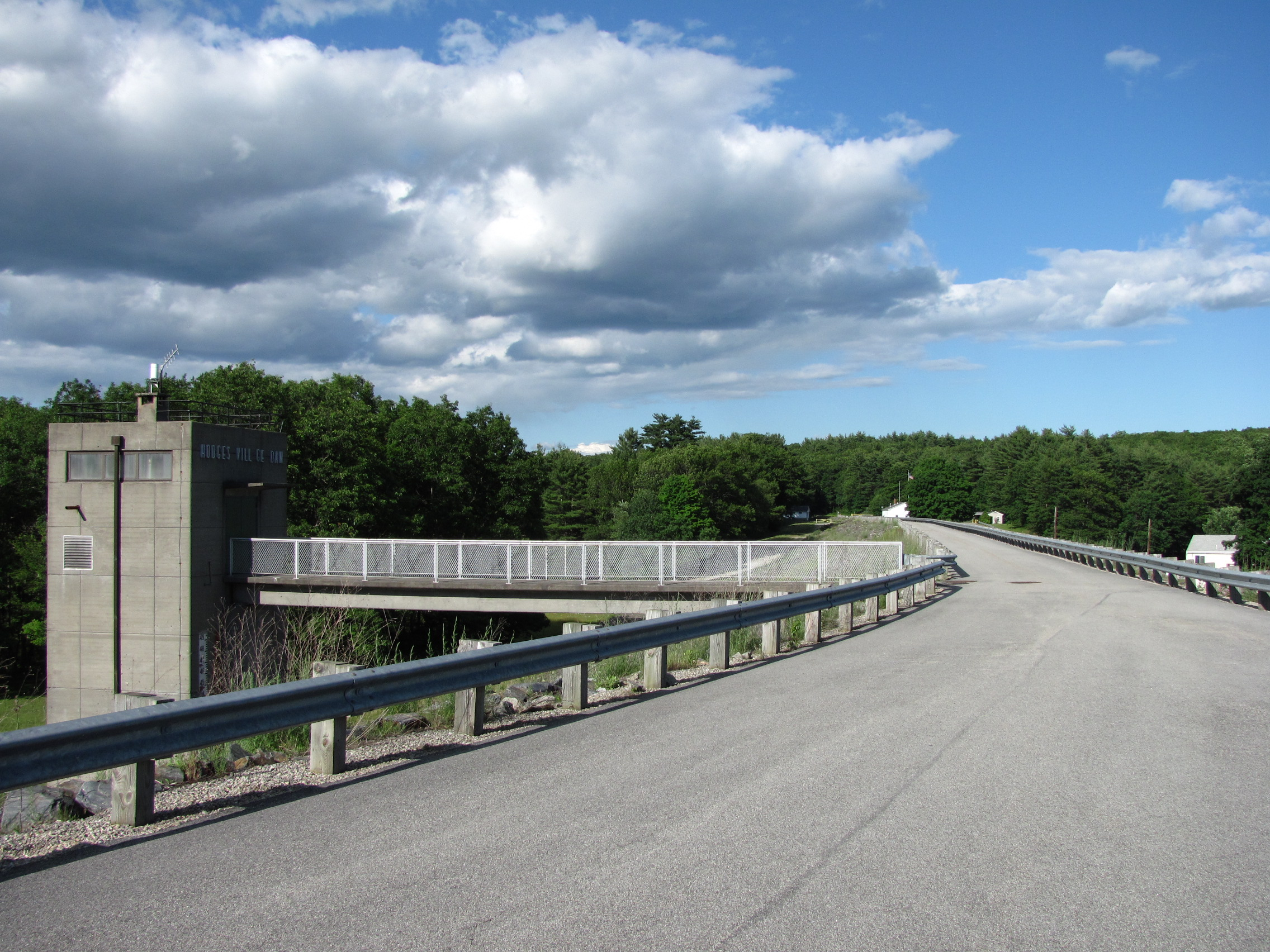
Hodges Village Dam

Hodges Village Dam, a United States Army Corps of Engineers flood control project on the French River (Massachusetts) in Oxford, Massachusetts was built in 1959 as a response to the 1936 floods which took lives and caused tremendous property damage in the Thames River basin of Connecticut. The western side of the French River is open to hunting, fishing, hiking, and boating. There are more than 18.2 miles of hiking trails on the property, as well as motorized bike trails on the west side of the river. ATV's and quads are restricted from the area. However, motorized bikes are allowed only on the west side of the river. There is a frisbee golf course that runs alongside the dam.

The 90 mile Midstate Trail passes through the project. Hodges Village Dam is managed as a unit with the nearby Buffumville Lake.
