= Crow Hills =

Highest point
- Elevation: 1,234 ft (376 m)and 1,220 feet (370 m)
- Coordinates: 42°31′24″N 71°51′44″W

Geography
- Location: Westminster, Massachusetts

Geology
- Mountain type(s): Metamorphic rock; monadnock

Climbing
- Easiest route: Midstate Trail

The Crow Hills, located in Massachusetts' Leominster State Forest 2.5 miles northeast of Mount Wachusett, are a single monadnock with a twin summit, 1,234 feet (376 m) and 1,220 feet (370 m), and a high eastern cliff. The hills are a popular rock climbing, bouldering, and hiking destination. The 92 miles (148 km) Midstate Trail traverses the hills.
