= Leominster State Forest =

Protected area in Massachusetts, United States

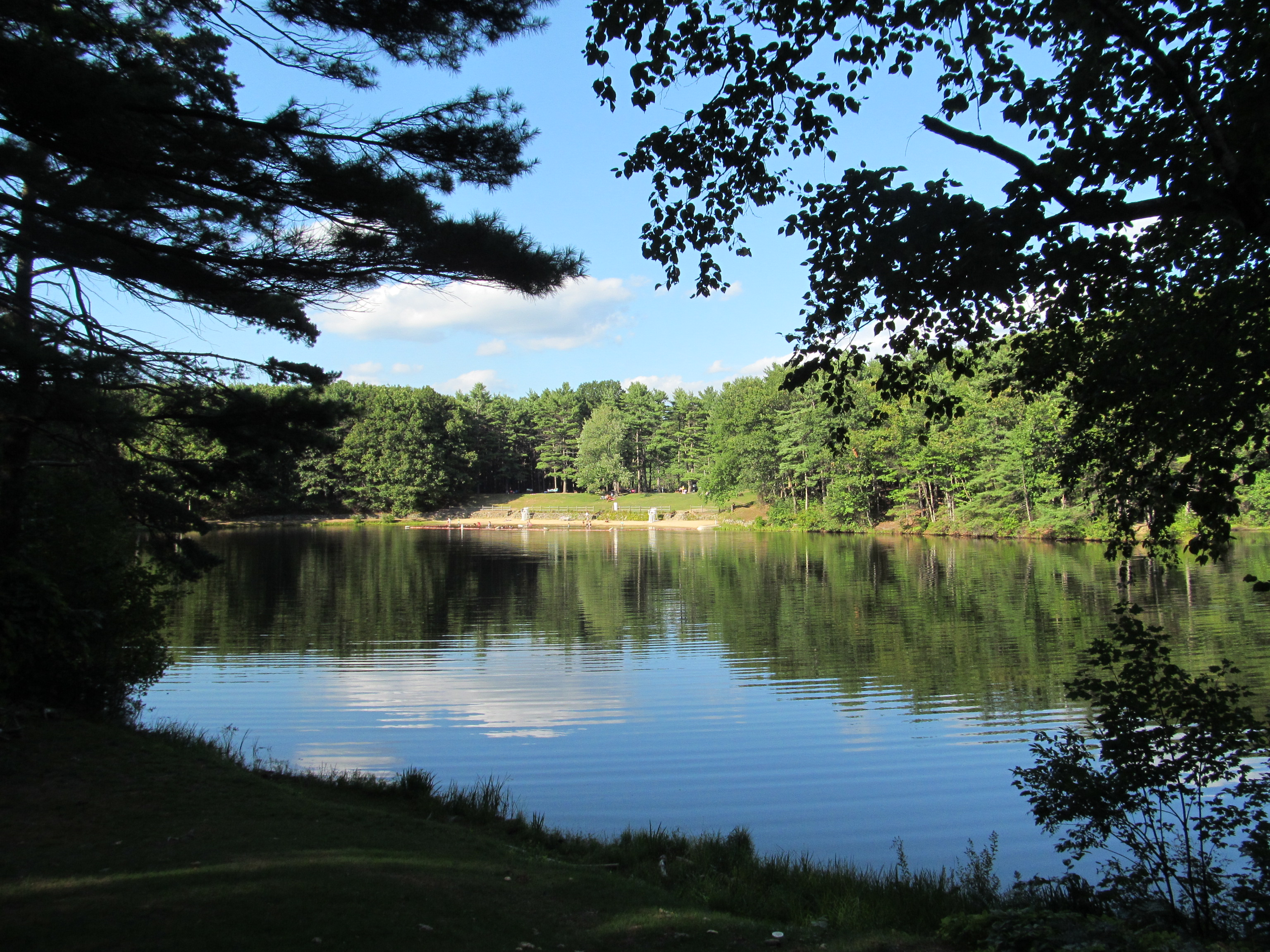
- Crow Hill Pond

- Location within Massachusetts Location within the United States
- Location: Leominster, Fitchburg, Princeton, Sterling and Westminster, Massachusetts, United States
- Coordinates: 42°31′35″N 71°51′39″W
- Area: 4,246 acres (1,718 ha)
- Elevation: 1,234 ft (376 m)
- Established: 1922
- Administrator: Massachusetts Department of Conservation and Recreation
- Website: Official website

Leominster State Forest is a publicly owned forest with recreational features covering 4,246 acres (1,718 ha) in the Massachusetts towns of Leominster, Fitchburg, Princeton, Sterling, and Westminster. The state forest encompasses an extensive trail system, numerous small ponds, and the Crow Hills. Plants such as mountain laurel are common as is an abundance of wildlife. The forest is headquarters for Massachusetts Bureau of Forest Fire Control District 8 and is managed by the Department of Conservation and Recreation.

== History ==
The Crow Hill ledges were used by Native Americans for shelter and signaling. Artifacts in the forest include cellar holes, stonewalls, fruit trees and other remnants of Notown, an unincorporated 18th-century settlement that was annexed into adjoining municipalities in 1838. The state's first purchase at the site took place in 1922, with expansions seen in many following years including 2002. The Civilian Conservation Corps was active in the forest from 1932 to 1938, constructing a network of roads, working on the park headquarters, and developing the area at Crow Hill Pond.

== Activities and amenities ==
Forest trails for hiking, mountain biking, cross-country skiing, and snowmobiling include a section of the Massachusetts Midstate Trail. Swimming is permitted at the beach on Crow Hill Pond, which has a bathhouse and picnicking area, and rock climbing takes place on the Crow Hills cliffs. Non-motorized boating is offered at Paradise Pond. Barrett's Pond and Crow Hill Pond are stocked with trout by the Division of Fisheries and Wildlife. The forest also offers restricted hunting.
