= Bullard House =

Historic house in Massachusetts, United States

- U.S. National Register of Historic Places
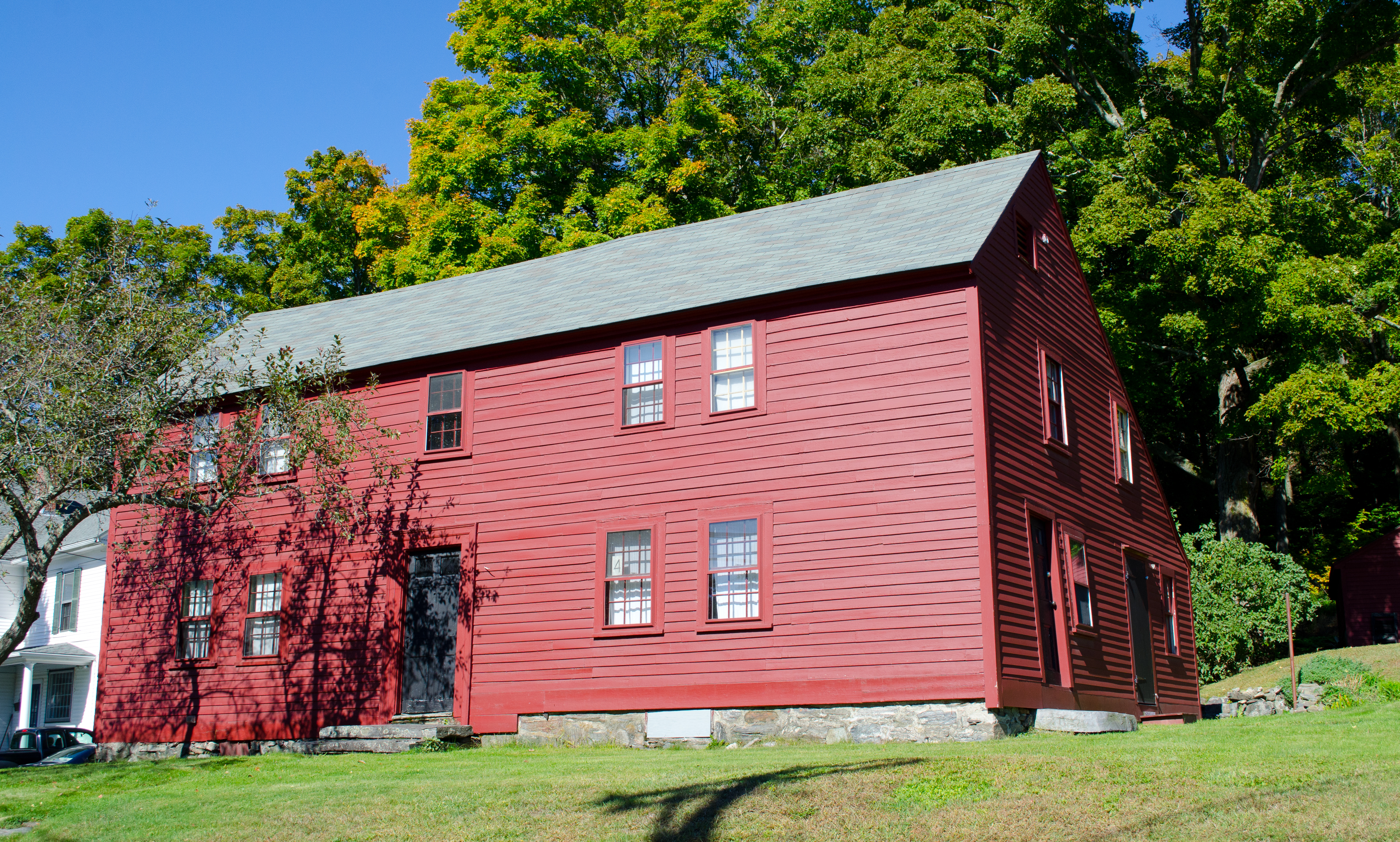

- Location within Massachusetts Location within the United States
- Location: Berlin, Massachusetts, United States
- Coordinates: 42°22′54″N 71°38′14″W
- Built: 1780
- NRHP reference No.: 11000664
- Added to NRHP: September 15, 2011

The Bullard House is an historic house at 4 Woodward Avenue in the center of Berlin, Massachusetts, United States.

== History ==
The 2 1/2-story wood-frame house has a complex construction history, having been modified or extended numerous times since its oldest portion was built c. 1780. This old portion was probably three bays wide and two stories high, with an entrance near the east present facade corner. In the early 1790s the building's size was greatly expanded, with additions to the west and rear, giving it a saltbox appearance. In the 1850s the west side of the rear leanto was further extended to add a new kitchen space. A shed was added to this kitchen space in the 1920s and enlarged in 1956, and a shed dormer was added to the east rear of the building.

The house has seen a variety of uses. When first built, it was used as a shop by John Pollard, Jr. At some point in the 1790s a tavern business was added, either by Pollard or one of the subsequent owners. It continued in use as a tavern until 1813, when Solomon Howe moved that business to a new building across the street. This house was then divided into two housing units, which were sold separately. The east side was mostly occupied by tenants for the next 150 years. The west side would be principally occupied by members of the Bullard family, who operated a smithy on the site for about 120 years. The two sides came under a single owner in 1941, but the units remained separate. The property was sold to the town in 1996, and now serves as a local history museum.

The house was listed on the National Register of Historic Places in 2011.

== In popular culture ==
The house featured as a location in the 1979 film The Europeans, a Merchant Ivory adaptation of the Henry James novel of the same name.

== See also ==
- National Register of Historic Places listings in Worcester County, Massachusetts
