= Quinsigamond State Park =

State park in Worcester, Massachusetts

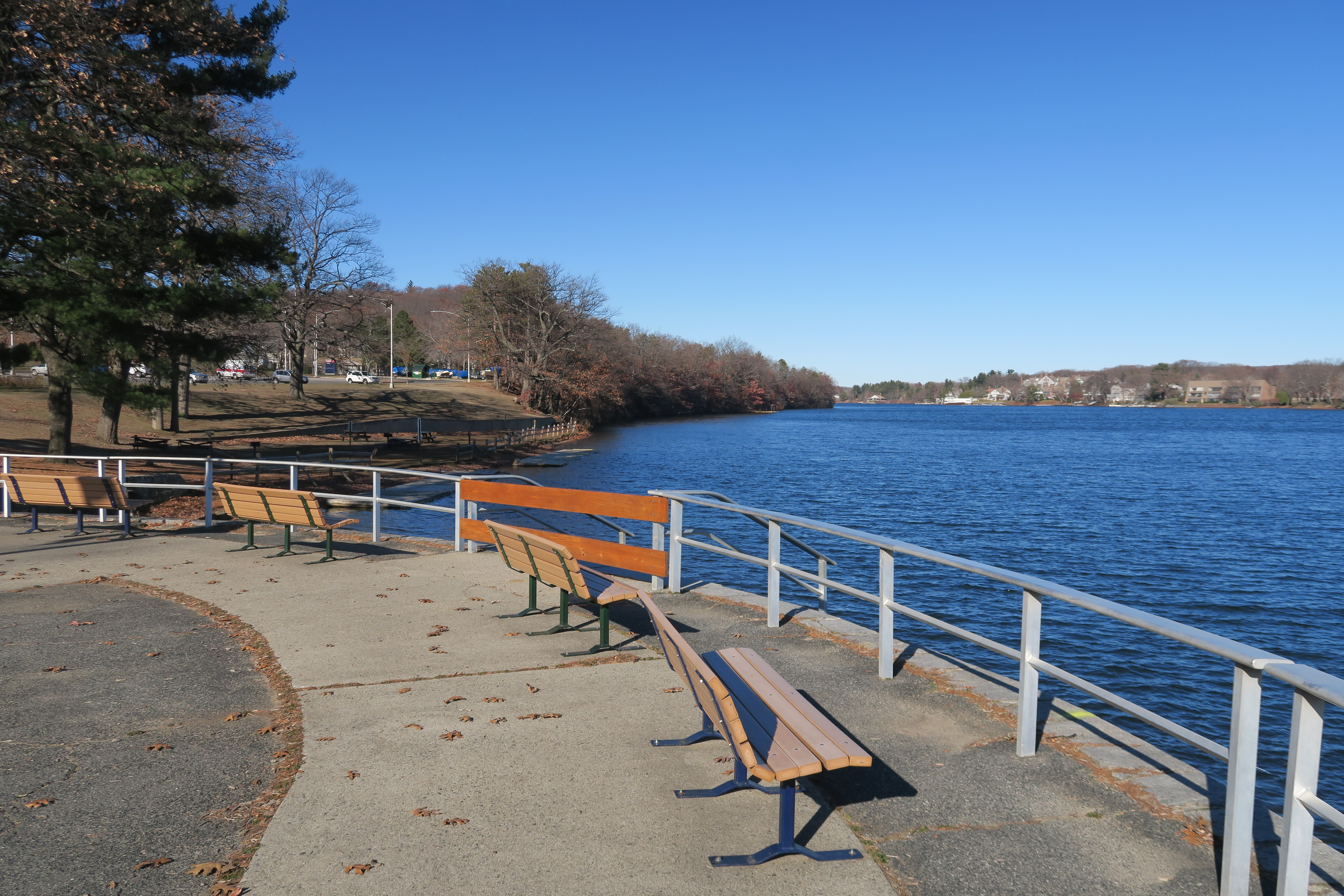
- Lake Quinsigamond from Regatta Point

- Location within Massachusetts Location within the United States
- Location: Worcester, Massachusetts, United States
- Coordinates: 42°15′37″N 71°45′10″W
- Area: 38 acres (15 ha)
- Elevation: 365 ft (111 m)
- Administrator: Massachusetts Department of Conservation and Recreation
- Website: Official website

Quinsigamond State Park is a public recreation area comprising two day-use areas along the western shore of Lake Quinsigamond in the city of Worcester, Massachusetts. The Regatta Point area is across North Lake Avenue from the University of Massachusetts Medical School, north of Route 9. The Lake Park area is south of Route 9. The park is managed by the Department of Conservation and Recreation.

== Activities and amenities ==
The park provides a place to view regattas on Lake Quinsigamond, an internationally known 2,000 meter rowing course and one of the oldest competition rowing sites in the country. The 25 acres (10 ha) at Regatta Point offers swimming, sailing, picnicking, and fishing facilities. The Lake Park area includes a picnic area, swimming beach, and tennis courts.
