= Worcester-Monadnock Plateau =

Ecoregion in north-eastern United States

The Worcester-Monadnock Plateau is an ecoregion in southern New England. It is an upland extending across southern New Hampshire and north-central Massachusetts. The landscape of the plateau reflects historic periods of glaciation; features such as glacial erratics, small moraines, drumlins, eskers, glacial till, and glaciated erosion are common. The bedrock of the region is largely metamorphic rock, though some igneous rock is present. Erosion, largely caused by glacial activity during the Pleistocene Epoch, has led to exposed bedrock at higher elevations. The landscape features monadnocks and low hills. Notable monadnocks on the region include Mount Wachusett, Mount Watatic, and Mount Monadnock.

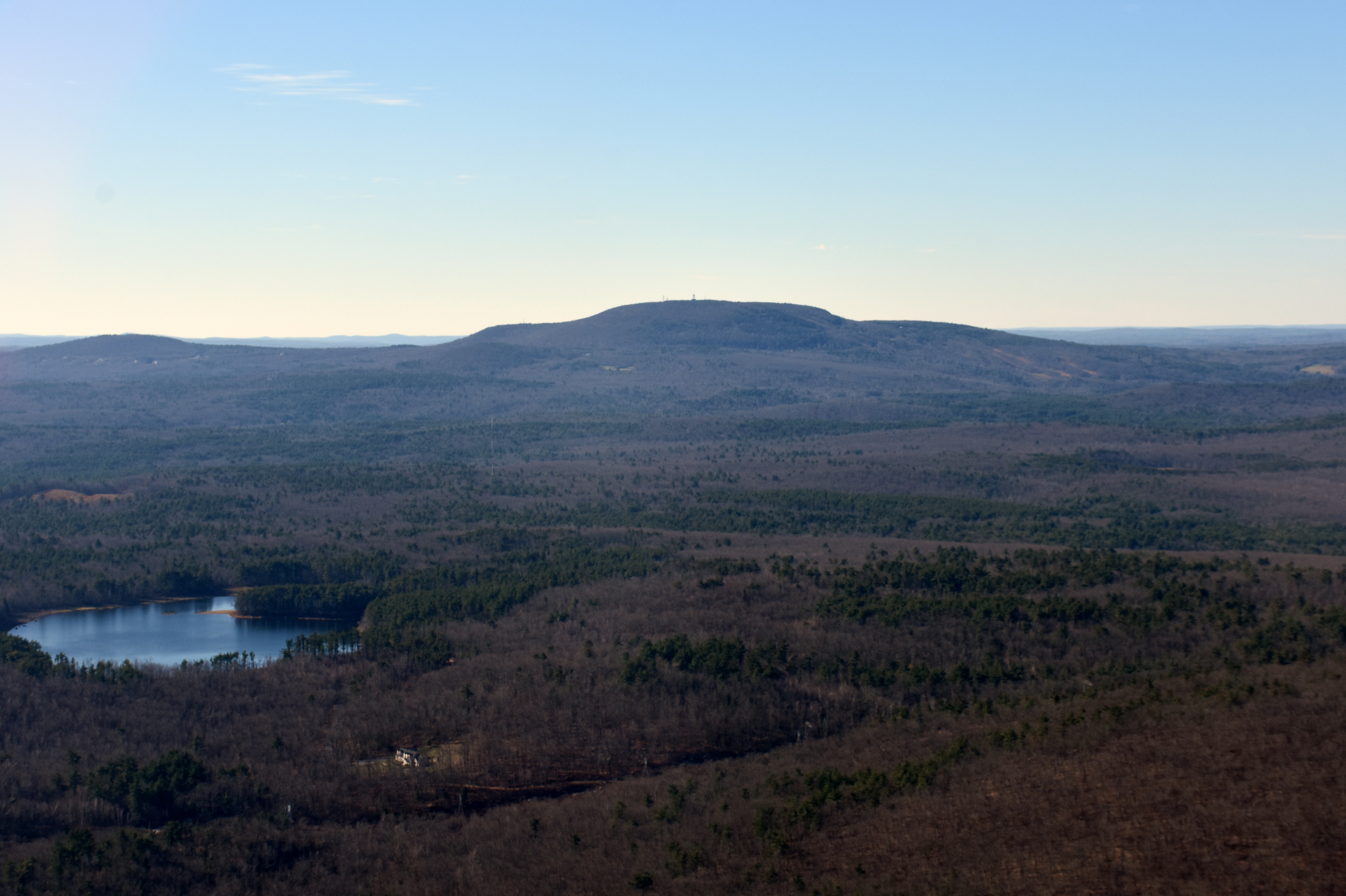
Aerial view of Mount Wachusett and surrounding area.

This region is largely forested, with several forest types present. The elevation variations caused by the monadnocks create subtle climate differences within the region, allowing for a diversity of forest types. It remains dominated by northern hardwood forests, though Appalachian oak forests are present in warmer locations in the region. Common trees include white oak, eastern white pine, red maple, American elm, and American beech.

The region features a humid continental climate, and is somewhat cooler than the coastal regions to the east and Connecticut River valley to the west.

The region is more sparsely populated than the surrounding areas. It is largely rural, containing mainly small towns. There are two small cities in the region: Keene, New Hampshire and Gardner, Massachusetts.
