= Lake Quinsigamond =

Lake in Central Massachusetts

- Location within Massachusetts Location within the United States
- Location: Shrewsbury / Worcester, Worcester County, Massachusetts
- Coordinates: 42°16′15″N 71°45′18″W
- Primary outflows: Quinsigamond River
- Basin countries: United States
- Max. length: 4 mi (6.4 km)
- Surface area: 772 acres (312 ha)
- Max. depth: 90 ft (27 m)
- Surface elevation: 358 ft (109 m)
- Islands: 8 (Drake Island)

Lake Quinsigamond (also Long Pond) is a body of water situated between the city of Worcester and the town of Shrewsbury in Worcester County, Massachusetts, United States. It is 4 miles (6.4 km) long, between 50 and 85 feet (15 and 26 m) deep, and has a surface area of approximately 772 acres (3.12 km^{2}). Lake Quinsigamond hosts eight islands, most of which are privately owned. Two islands are connected to land via bridge. The largest island, Drake Island, is state-owned. Water from the lake empties into the Quinsigamond River in the Blackstone Valley.

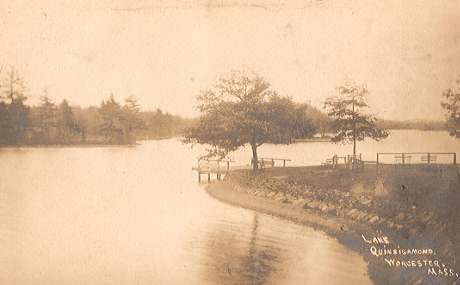
View of Lake Quinsigamond shoreline in 1910

== Bridging the lake ==
The lake's long and narrow shape posed a challenge to settlers of the Worcester area in the 17th century since it was deeded by Peter Jethro and other Native Americans in 1665. Lacking modern bridging techniques, westward travelers had to ride around the lake's northern and southern tips. At the turn of the 19th century, Isaiah Thomas, a Worcester resident, developed plans for a direct link between Worcester and Boston (plans that eventually became Route 9). Construction of this road was under the authority of the Worcester Turnpike Corporation (until 1841; thereafter, the city of Worcester). Like the settlers 150 years earlier, Thomas and company faced the problem of Lake Quinsigamond. The first span across the lake was a floating log bridge, built in 1806. This first attempt was unstable, often swaying under the weight of horse-drawn wagons. The floating bridge was broken apart by waves in 1806, and was rebuilt in the year 1807 as an interim solution.

The second bridge was an early suspension bridge, and was completed in early 1817. Nine wooden piers, built into the lakebed at regular intervals, held aloft a gravel-covered plank bridge. Due to the unstable nature of the lakebed, the nine piers settled at different levels, causing gaps to appear in the road surface. The piers and the bridge split apart and fell into the water on September 19, 1817. The collapse of the suspension bridge was quickly followed with a second floating bridge, this one lasting until 1861.

The first stable bridge over Lake Quinsigamond (the fourth such attempt overall) was an earthen causeway, finished in 1863. Formed from a mixture of rock, gravel and dirt, the causeway was the first span to not sway under heavy loads. The causeway effectively split the lake in half, stifling the nascent lakeside steamboat industry. Contemporary public opinion likened the causeway to an 'eyesore' and an 'abomination'. Despite these problems, the span survived into the early 20th century, when it was replaced by the current bridge. In ca. 1900, the causeway was expanded to include trolley tracks, linking downtown Worcester to the lakeside attractions.

A modern, two-lane bridge made of stone, cement and steel replaced the old causeway on July 31, 1919. Renovations completed in 1973 expanded the bridge to a four-lane roadway. At the north end of the lake, a second bridge was built to support Interstate 290.

The new Kenneth F. Burns Memorial Bridge opened November 1, 2015 and carries Route 9 over Lake Quinsigamond. The crossing is a two barrel steel arch bridge that consists of two separate structures supporting eastbound and westbound traffic. Each structure is an 870-foot-long, five-span, open spandrel steel-tied deck arch, supported on two concrete abutments and four perched pile caps. The two structures both carry three traffic lanes, a bike lane, and a pedestrian walkway, with overlooks provided for scenic views of the lake.

== Attractions on the lake ==
=== Historical ===
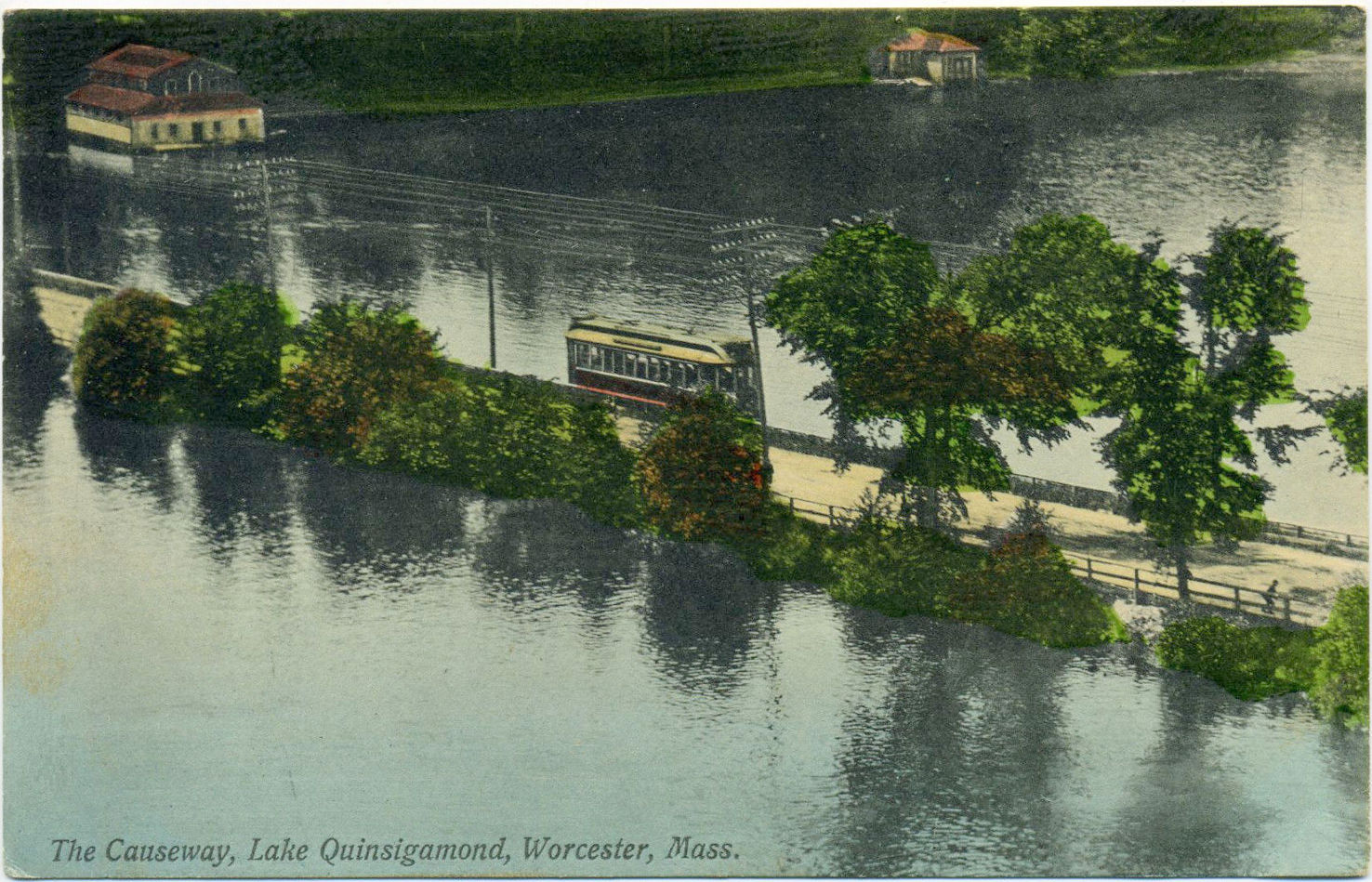
Lake Quinsigamond causeway in 1908

Most of the lakeside development occurred around the southern shores, due to the construction of the causeway in 1863. The causeway split the lake in half for those traveling by water, namely, steamboat cruises and competitive rowers. Lincoln Park, a family amusement park, opened on the Worcester (western) side of the lake in 1867; steamboat cruises began twenty years earlier, launched from the site of the Park. Horace H. Bigelow, a local businessman, opened a competing amusement park called White City on the Shrewsbury side in 1905. Both parks became famous for unique rides: Lincoln for the 'Dummy Railroad,' a passenger train running between Union Station in Worcester and the Park; White City, for its artificial lake, Shoot-the-Chutes ride, and other water attractions.

By the 1940s, both parks began to suffer declines in attendance due to development elsewhere along the lake's shores. White City, once a park that featured '50,000 Electric Lights,' shut down on Labor Day, 1960. Lincoln Park closed in 1961, and the White City property was sold in November of that same year. Both parks lost buildings due to suspicious fires during their final years.

=== Current ===
The buyer of the White City property, Albert Shore, developed the land into a shopping center and movie theater complex shortly after the amusement park's closure. The retail complex still bears the White City name, though the movie theater, White City Cinemas, was shut down in recent years. An elder apartment complex now stands on the former site of Lincoln Park.

=== Quinsigamond State Park ===
Quinsigamond State Park is located on the Worcester side, to the north and south of Route 9.

=== Ramshorn Island ===
Ramshorn Island is owned by the city of Worcester, and is open to the public. Its walking paths cover the circumference of the 1.5 acre island, which is located toward the western bank of the lake just south of the renovated Kenneth F. Burns Memorial Bridge. The island is only accessible by boat.

== Regattas on the lake ==
Competitive rowing teams first came to Lake Quinsigamond in 1857. Finding the lake ideal for such crew regattas, avid rowers established boating clubs on the lake's shores, the first being the Quinsigamond Boating Club. More boating clubs and races followed, and soon many colleges (both local and abroad) held regattas on the lake, such as the New England Rowing Championships, the ECAC National Invitational Championship, the Eastern Sprints, the Big East Championship and the Patriot League Championship. The NEIRA championship regatta has been held on the lake since the 1950s and now features over 40 schools in 8+, 4+ and 1X divisions. Beginning in 1895, local high schools held crew races on the lake. In 1952, the lake played host to the National Olympic rowing trials. The Quinsigamond Rowing Association hosted the US Rowing Masters National Championship in 2005, 2012 and 2016.

== Mandaean ritual use ==
The Mandaean-American community of Worcester regularly performs masbuta (baptism) rituals in Lake Quinsigamond.
