= Buffumville Lake =

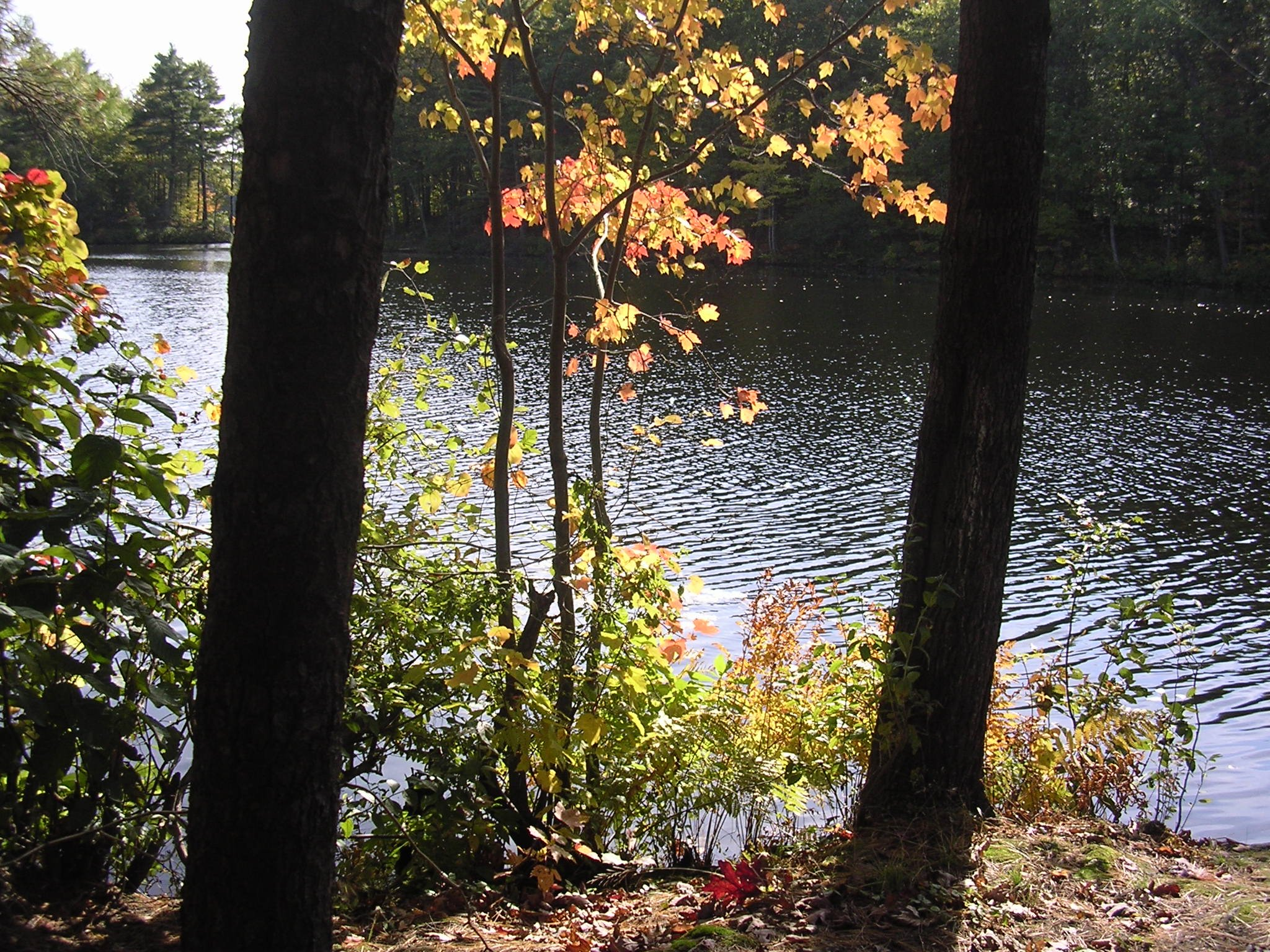
- Buffumville Lake shore

- Location within Massachusetts Location within the United States
- Location: Charlton, Massachusetts
- Coordinates: 42°07′06″N 71°54′38″W
- Type: reservoir
- Basin countries: United States
- Surface area: 200 acres (81 ha)
- Water volume: 5.2×10^{9} US gal (20×10^{6} m^{3})
- Surface elevation: 490 ft (150 m)

Buffumville Lake is a 200-acre (0.81 km^{2}), 5.2-billion-US-gallon (20,000,000 m^{3}) capacity United States Army Corps of Engineers flood control lake project located in Charlton, Massachusetts. The lake and surrounding grounds are open to the public for hiking, boating, fishing, and hunting. A 27-hole frisbee golf course is located next to the lake. Buffumville Lake is managed as a unit with the nearby Hodges Village Dam flood control project.

The 92-mile (148 km) Midstate Trail is accessible from the north end of the lake.
