= District Five Schoolhouse =

- U.S. National Register of Historic Places
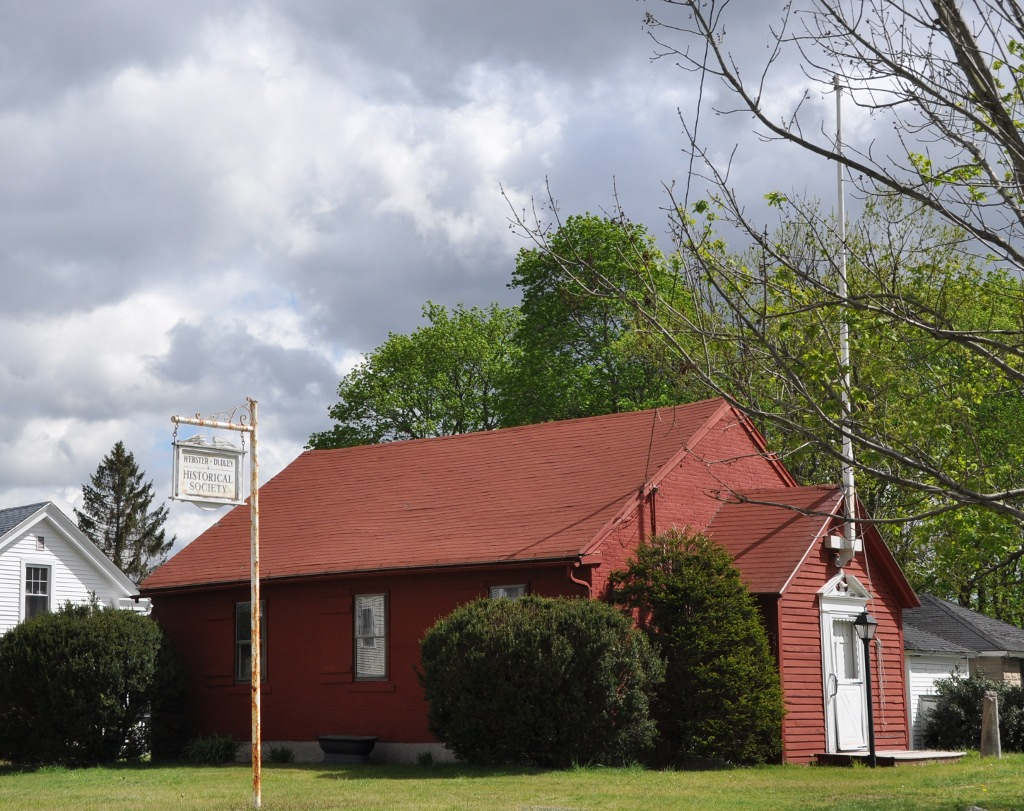

- Location within Massachusetts Location within the United States
- Location: 449 School Street, Webster, Massachusetts
- Coordinates: 42°2′34″N 71°52′58″W
- Built: 1835
- Architect: Wood, Harvey
- Architectural style: Greek Revival
- NRHP reference No.: 91000697
- Added to NRHP: June 5, 1991

The District Five Schoolhouse, also known as the Fenner Hill School, is a historic former school building at 449 School Street in Webster, Massachusetts. Built in 1835, the one-room schoolhouse was the first school building built by the recently incorporated town of Webster. It served the town as a school for 100 years, after which it was used by the school system for storage. In 1966 it became the museum and headquarters of the Webster-Dudley Historical Society. The building was listed on the National Register of Historic Places in 1991.

== Description and history ==
The District Five Schoolhouse is located south of Webster's central business district, on the east side of School Street, historically the major route leading south toward Thompson, Connecticut. It is a single-story brick building, rectangular in shape, with a gable roof oriented parallel to the street. A gable-roofed wood frame vestibule on the south side houses the main entrance, and a shed-roof ell extends to the north. The east and west sides each have three sash windows. The interior houses a single classroom, with the northern ell originally housing wood storage and a bathroom, now altered to house a kitchen and bath.

The town of Webster was incorporated in 1832, principally by the efforts of early industrialist Samuel Slater, out of neighboring towns. This school was built soon afterward, and was the first school to be built in the new town, at a cost of $447.50. Although the town abolished its district school system in 1867, this school remained open, serving the nearby neighborhood. In 1883 the school designated one of the town's primary schools. The school was briefly closed during the Great Depression, and was permanently closed in 1939. After being used by the town for storage for many years, it was leased in 1962 to the local historical society for $1, on the condition it be used as a museum.

== See also ==
- National Register of Historic Places listings in Worcester County, Massachusetts
