= North South Trail (Rhode Island) =

Hiking trail that runs the length of Rhode Island

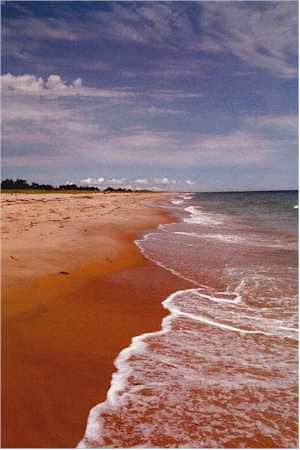
Ninigret Beach at southern end of the North South Trail

The North South Trail is a 77-mile (124 km) hiking trail that runs the length of Rhode Island from the Atlantic Ocean in Charlestown to the Massachusetts border in Burrillville, Rhode Island. The trail is remarkably rural and scenic. Features include attractive lakeshores, bogs, beaches, hills, rock outcrops, farmland, and dense woodland.

The North South Trail is the logical extension of the Midstate Trail in Massachusetts and the Wapack Trail in New Hampshire; these three trails together make up a 191-mile (307 km) greenway footpath.
