= Barre Falls Dam =

Dam in Massachusetts, United States

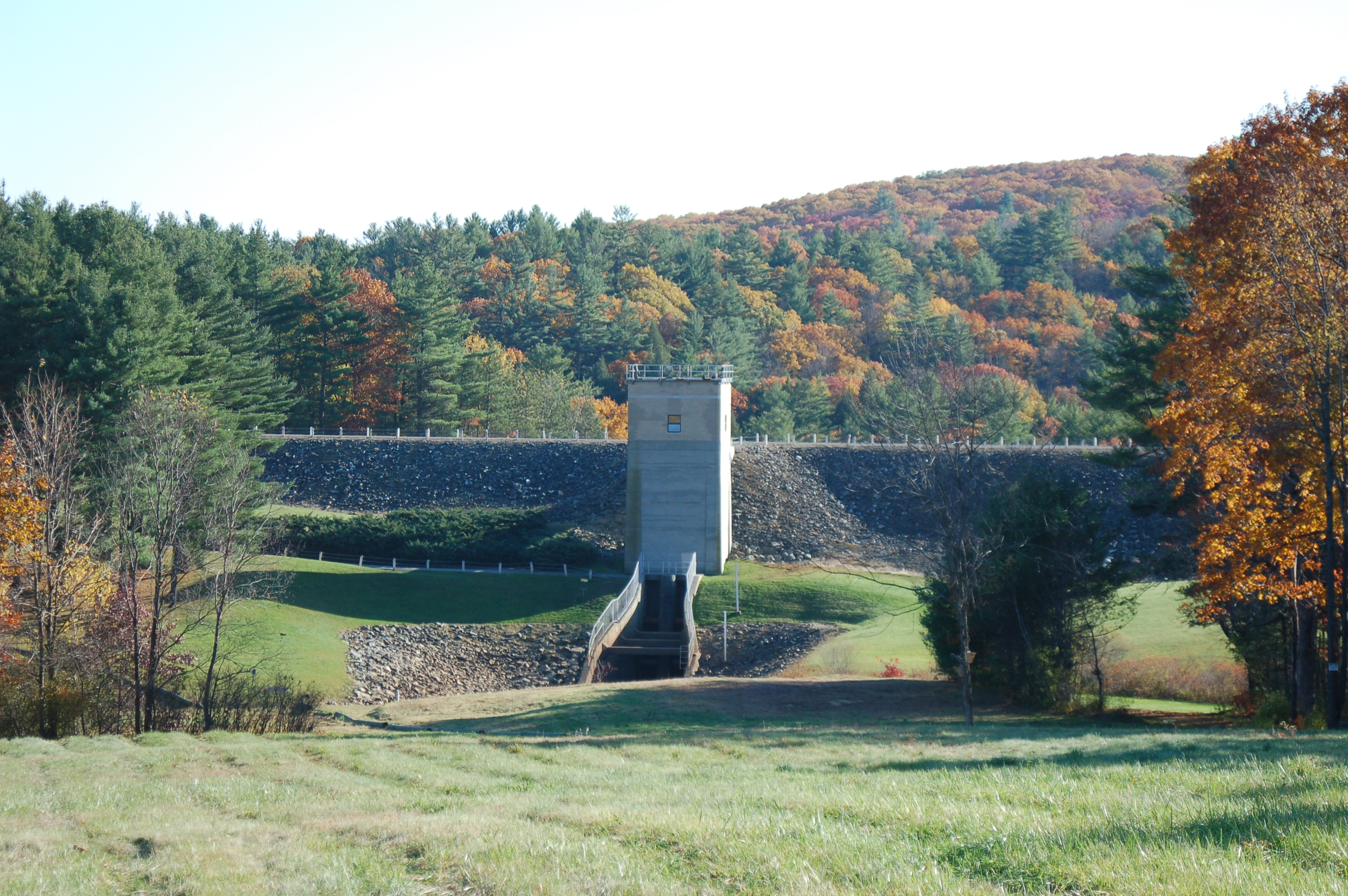
- Barre Falls Dam
- Interactive map of Barre Falls Dam
- Official name: Barre Falls Dam
- Location: Barre, Massachusetts
- Coordinates: 42°25′40″N 72°01′31″W
- Construction began: 1956
- Opening date: 1959
- Operator: Army Corps of Engineers

Dam and spillways
- Impounds: Ware River
- Height: 69 ft (21 m)
- Length: 3,215 ft (980 m)

Reservoir
- Creates: Barre Falls temporary impoundment area

The Barre Falls Dam is located on the Ware River in Barre, Massachusetts, United States, about 0.3 miles (0.48 km) below the junction of the river's east and west branches and 13 miles (21 km) northwest of Worcester, Massachusetts.

Designed and constructed by the United States Army Corps of Engineers, this dam substantially reduces flooding along the Ware, Chicopee, and Connecticut rivers. Construction of the project began in May 1956 with completion in July 1958 at a cost of US$2 million.

The Barre Falls reservoir is within the Upper Ware River Watershed and is part of the Chicopee River Watershed. Access to the site is available from Route 62.

== Description ==
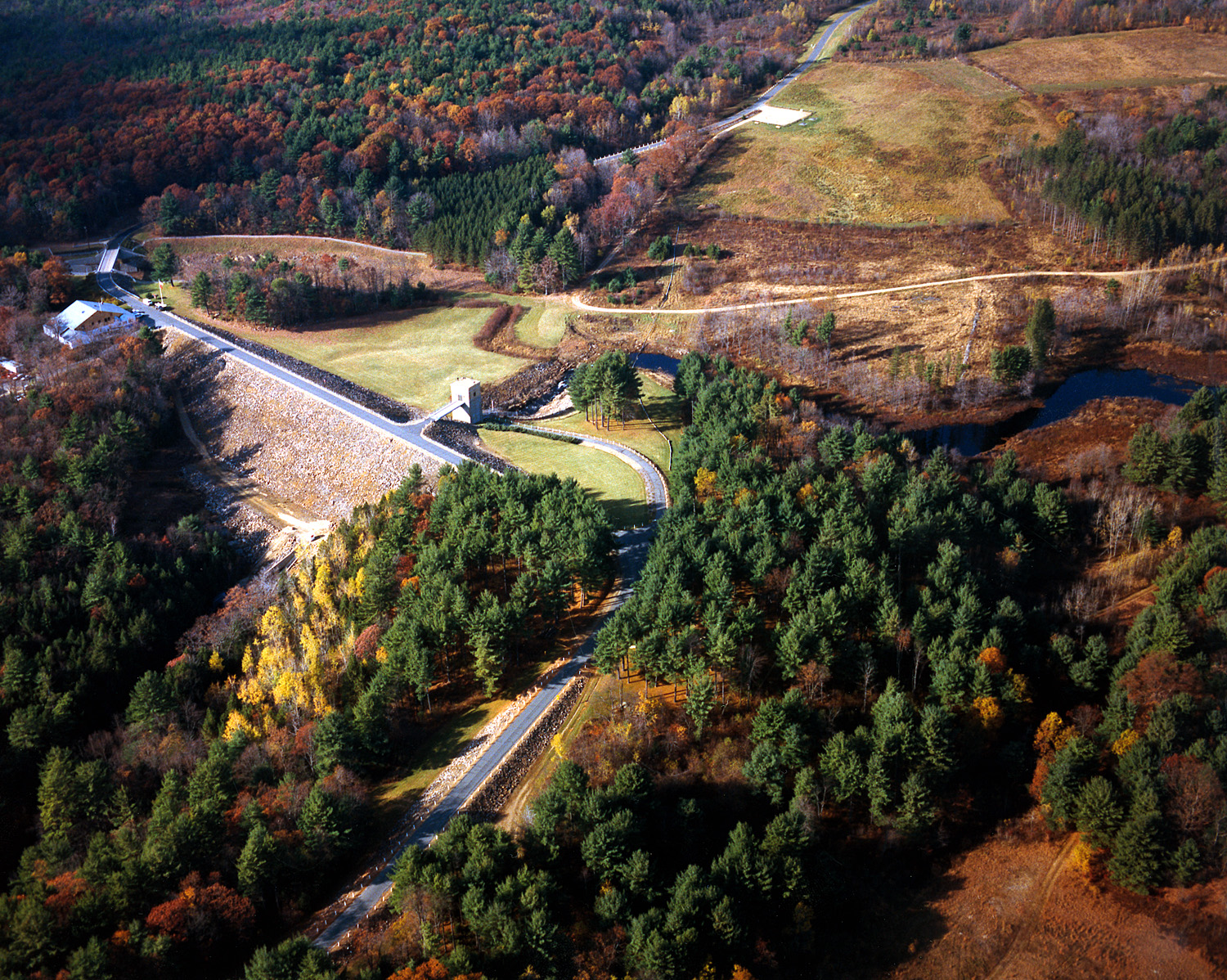
Barre Falls Dam

Barre Falls Dam bridge
- Coordinates: 42°25′40″N 72°01′31″W
- Carries: Rueben Walker Road

Characteristics
- Width: Two lanes
- Clearance above: Unrestricted

Statistics
- Daily traffic: < 100 vehicles

Location
- Interactive map of Barre Falls Dam bridge

The project consists of an earth fill dam with stone slope protection 885 feet (270 m) long and 69 feet (21 m) high. There are three dikes totaling 3,215 feet (980 m) in length with a maximum elevation of 48 feet (15 m). Cut in rock, the spillway comprises a concrete weir 60 ft (18 m). in length. The weir's crest elevation is 23 feet (7.0 m) lower than the top of the dam. There is no lake at the Barre Falls Dam. The flood storage area for the project, which is normally empty, stores floodwaters and covers about 1,500 acres (6.1 km^{2}) in the towns of Barre, Hubbardston, Rutland, and Oakham, Massachusetts. The entire project, including all associated lands, covers 2,407 acres (9.74 km^{2}). The Barre Falls Dam can store up to 7.82 billion US gallons (29,600,000 m^{3}) of water for flood control purposes. This is equivalent to 8.2 inches (21 cm) of water covering its drainage area of 55 square miles (140 square kilometers).

== Management ==
The Massachusetts Department of Conservation and Recreation manage and preserve the land for water quality protection. The Massachusetts Water Resources Authority manages these water resources, which are part of the public water supply for the Greater Boston area. The Corps assists the MWRA by coordinating flows to maximize diversion rates, and the MWRA assists the Corps when requested to divert excess flows to help with flood control. Camping, swimming and wading are not permitted. However, there is an 18-hole disc golf course which spans much of the premises.
