= List of airports in Massachusetts =

This is a list of airports in Massachusetts (a U.S. state), grouped by type and sorted by location. It contains all public use and military airports in the state. Some private-use and former airports may be included where notable, such as airports that were previously public-use, those with commercial enplanements recorded by the FAA or airports assigned an IATA airport code.

As of 2009, there were 37 public-use airports, 184 private landing areas, and 2 seaplane bases in Massachusetts. 24 of the public-use airports are government owned, either by municipalities or the Massachusetts Port Authority.

== Airports ==
This list contains the following information:

- **City served** – The city generally associated with the airport, as per the airport's master record with the Federal Aviation Administration. This is not always the actual location since some airports are located in smaller towns outside of the city they serve. It is not meant to be a complete list of cities served, which can be found in or added to each airport's Wikipedia article.
- **FAA** – The location identifier assigned by the Federal Aviation Administration (FAA).
- **IATA** – The airport code assigned by the International Air Transport Association (IATA). Those that do not match the FAA code are shown in bold.
- **ICAO** – The location indicator assigned by the International Civil Aviation Organization (ICAO).
- **Airport name** – The official airport name. Those shown in **bold** indicate the airport has scheduled passenger service on commercial airlines.
- **Role** – One of four FAA airport categories, as per the 2021–2025 National Plan of Integrated Airport Systems (NPIAS) report released September 2020:
  - P-s: Commercial service – primary are publicly owned airports that receive scheduled passenger service and have more than 10,000 passenger boardings (enplanements) each year. Each primary airport is sub-classified by the FAA as one of the following four "hub" types (s):
    - L: Large hub that accounts for at least 1% of total U.S. passenger enplanements.
    - M: Medium hub that accounts for between 0.25% and 1% of total U.S. passenger enplanements.
    - S: Small hub that accounts for between 0.05% and 0.25% of total U.S. passenger enplanements.
    - N: Nonhub that accounts for less than 0.05% of total U.S. passenger enplanements, but more than 10,000 annual enplanements.
  - CS: Commercial service – nonprimary are publicly owned airports that receive scheduled passenger service and have at least 2,500 passenger boardings each year.
  - R: Reliever airports are designated by the FAA to relieve congestion at a large commercial service airport and to provide more general aviation access to the overall community.
  - GA: General aviation airports are the largest single group of airports in the U.S. airport system. They are public-use airports that do not have scheduled service or have scheduled service with less than 2,500 passenger boardings each year.
- **Enplanements** – The number of enplanements (commercial passenger boardings) that occurred at the airport in calendar year 2024, as per FAA records released October 2025.

City served	FAA	IATA	ICAO	Airport name	Role	Enplanements (2024)
				**Commercial service – primary airports**		
Boston	BOS	BOS	KBOS	**Gen. Edward Lawrence Logan International Airport**	P-L	21,090,721
Hyannis	HYA	HYA	KHYA	**Cape Cod Gateway Airport** (Boardman/Polando Field)	P-N	25,626
Nantucket	ACK	ACK	KACK	**Nantucket Memorial Airport**	P-N	154,173
Vineyard Haven	MVY	MVY	KMVY	**Martha's Vineyard Airport**	P-N	83,419
Worcester	ORH	ORH	KORH	**Worcester Regional Airport**	P-N	112,872
				**Commercial service – nonprimary airports**		
Bedford	BED	BED	KBED	Hanscom Field / Hanscom Air Force Base	CS	22,049
New Bedford	EWB	EWB	KEWB	**New Bedford Regional Airport**	CS	2,060
Provincetown	PVC	PVC	KPVC	**Provincetown Municipal Airport**	CS	7,033
				**Reliever airports**		
Beverly	BVY	BVY	KBVY	Beverly Regional Airport	R	192
Lawrence	LWM	LWM	KLWM	Lawrence Municipal Airport	R	71
Norwood	OWD	OWD	KOWD	**Norwood Memorial Airport**	R	743
				**General aviation airports**		
Chatham	CQX		KCQX	Chatham Municipal Airport	GA	313
Fitchburg	FIT		KFIT	Fitchburg Municipal Airport	GA	7
Gardner	GDM	GDM	KGDM	Gardner Municipal Airport	GA	0
Great Barrington	GBR	GBR	KGBR	Walter J. Koladza Airport (Great Barrington Airport)	GA	45
Mansfield	1B9			Mansfield Municipal Airport	GA	9
Marshfield	GHG		KGHG	Marshfield Municipal Airport (George Harlow Field)	GA	122
Montague	0B5			Turners Falls Airport	GA	33
North Adams	AQW		KAQW	Harriman-and-West Airport	GA	21
Northampton	7B2			Northampton Airport	GA	13
Orange	ORE		KORE	Orange Municipal Airport	GA	0
Pittsfield	PSF	PSF	KPSF	Pittsfield Municipal Airport	GA	70
Plymouth	PYM	PYM	KPYM	Plymouth Municipal Airport	GA	74
Southbridge	3B0			Southbridge Municipal Airport	GA	0
Springfield / Chicopee	CEF	CEF	KCEF	Westover Metropolitan Airport / Westover Air Reserve Base	GA	674
Stow	6B6			Minute Man Air Field	GA	6
Taunton	TAN		KTAN	Taunton Municipal Airport (King Field)	GA	3
Westfield / Springfield	BAF	BAF	KBAF	Westfield-Barnes Regional Airport	GA	1,225
				**Other public-use airports** (not listed in NPIAS)		
Berkley	1M8			Myricks Airport		
Edgartown	1B2			Katama Airpark		21
Falmouth	5B6			Falmouth Airpark		
Halifax	MA6			Monponsett Pond Seaplane Base		
Hanson	28M			Cranland Airport		
Hopedale	1B6			Hopedale Industrial Park Airport		
Marstons Mills	2B1			Cape Cod Airfield		
Newburyport	2B2			Plum Island Airport		
Spencer	60M			Spencer Airport		
Sterling	3B3			Sterling Airport		
				**Military airports**		
Falmouth	FMH	FMH	KFMH	Otis Air National Guard Base		
Springfield	CEF	CEF	KCEF	Westover Metropolitan Airport		
				**Notable private-use airports**		
Amesbury	6MA0			Lake Gardner Seaplane Base		
Ipswich	MA36			Snow Airport (former public use, FAA: PHQ)		
Oak Bluffs	MA44			Trade Wind Airport		
Southwick	28MA			Cannizzaro Field		
Ware	MA53	UWA		Ware Airport (former public use, FAA: UWA)		
				**Notable former airports**		
Acushnet				Acushnet Airport (1952–1959)		
Agawam	~~7B0~~			Bowles Agawam Airport (1930–1985)		
Ayer	~~AYE~~			Moore Army Airfield (1929–1995)		
Barre	~~8B5~~			Tanner-Hiller Airport (1946–2024)		
Bolton				Bolton Airport (1931–1951)		
Braintree				Braintree Airport (1948–1968)		
Brockton				Brockton Airport (1920s–1950s)		
Canton				Boston Metropolitan Airport (1931–1950s)		
Chatham				Chatham Naval Air Station		
Chilmark				No Man's Land Navy Airfield		
Fall River	~~FLR~~		~~KFLR~~	Fall River Municipal Airport (closed 1996–1998)		
Hanover				Clark Airport		
Danvers				Robbins Airport		
Gloucester				Coast Guard Aviation Station Ten Pound Island		
Grafton				Grafton Airport		
Hatfield	~~MA03~~			Hatfield-Pilgrim Airport		
Haverhill	~~8B6~~			Haverhill Dutton Airport		
Haverhill	~~MA04~~			Haverhill Riverside Airport & Seaplane Base		
Lancaster				Pine Hill Airport		
Leicester	~~MA04~~			Leicester Airport		
Lowell				Lowell Airport		
Marlborough	~~9B1~~			Marlboro Airport		
Methuen	~~MA2~~			Merrimack Valley Seaplane Base		
Nomans Land				No Man's Land Navy Airfield		
Norfolk				Henan-Menon Memorial Airport		
North Middleboro				North Middleboro Airpark		
Quincy				NAS Squantum		
Palmer	13MA	PMX		Metropolitan Airport (former public use, FAA: PMX)		
Revere				Revere Airport (1927–1962)		
Salem				CGAS Salem		
Saugus				Saugus Field		
Seekonk, MA				Providence Airport (1928–1950s)		
South Weymouth	~~NZY~~			Naval Air Station South Weymouth (Shea Field)		
Springfield				Springfield Airport		
Tewksbury	~~B09~~			Tew-Mac Airport (closed 1997)		
Westboro	~~3B6~~			Westboro Airport (1934–1980)		

== See also ==
- Massachusetts World War II Army Airfields
- Essential Air Service
- Wikipedia:WikiProject Aviation/Airline destination lists: North America#Massachusetts

== Sources ==
Federal Aviation Administration (FAA):

- FAA Airport Data (Form 5010) from National Flight Data Center (NFDC), also available from AirportIQ 5010
- National Plan of Integrated Airport Systems (2011–2015), released September 2016
- Passenger Boarding (Enplanement) Data for CY 2024, released September 2025
- Passenger Boarding (Enplanement) Data for CY 2016 (final), released October 2017

Massachusetts Department of Transportation (MassDOT):

- MassDOT Aeronautics Division (formerly Massachusetts Aeronautics Commission)
  - Airport Data

Other sites used as a reference when compiling and updating this list:

- Aviation Safety Network – used to check IATA airport codes
- Great Circle Mapper: Airports in Massachusetts – used to check IATA and ICAO airport codes
- Abandoned & Little-Known Airfields: Massachusetts – used for information on former airports
