= Fitchburg Municipal Airport =

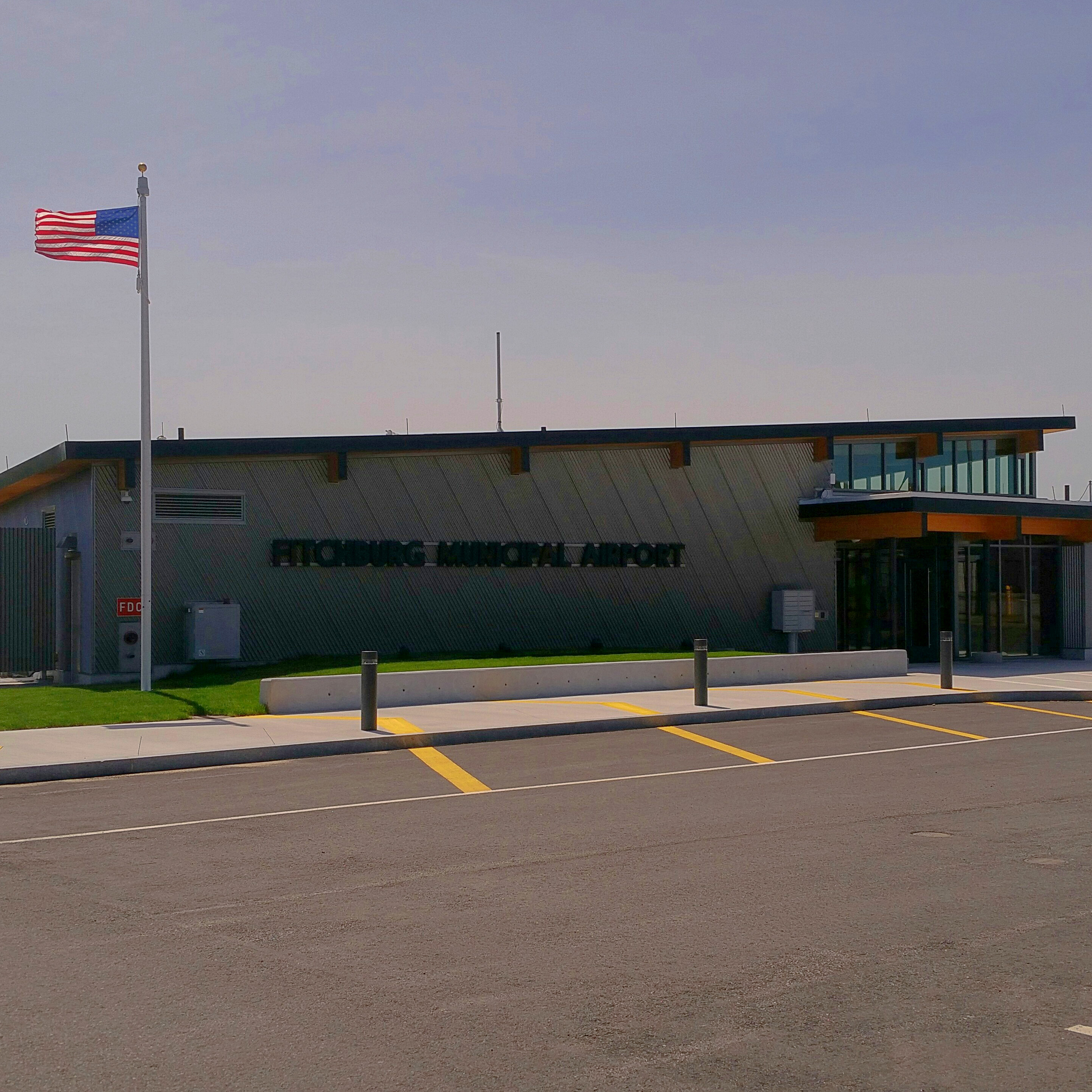
- IATA: none; ICAO: KFIT; FAA LID: FIT

Summary
- Airport type: Public
- Owner: City of Fitchburg
- Location: Fitchburg, Massachusetts
- Elevation AMSL: 345 ft (105 m)
- Coordinates: 42°33′15″N 071°45′32″W
- Website: www.fitchburgma.gov

Map
- Interactive map of Fitchburg Municipal Airport

Runways
Direction	Length		Surface
Direction	ft	m	Surface
14/32	5,001	1,524	Asphalt

Statistics (2020)
- Aircraft operations (year ending 5/14/2020): 13,200
- Based aircraft: 100
- Source: Federal Aviation Administration

Fitchburg Municipal Airport (ICAO: KFIT, FAA LID: FIT) is a public airport located 3 miles (5 km) southeast of the central business district of Fitchburg, a city in Worcester County, Massachusetts, United States. This airport is owned by the City of Fitchburg. The airport also serves as a base for the Fitchburg Pilots Association/EAA chapter 1454. This group uses the airport to host events such as Young Eagles and flights in EAA's Ford Trimotor. The airport underwent a renovation in 2020 that extended runway 14/32 by 500 feet to its current length of 5001 feet. The runway extension was to meet requirements for insurance companies to permit certain small jets to land and take off from the airport. The renovation removed runway 2/20. Occasionally the airport serves as a home for rock festivals such as The Warped Tour and Locobazooka.

== Facilities and aircraft ==
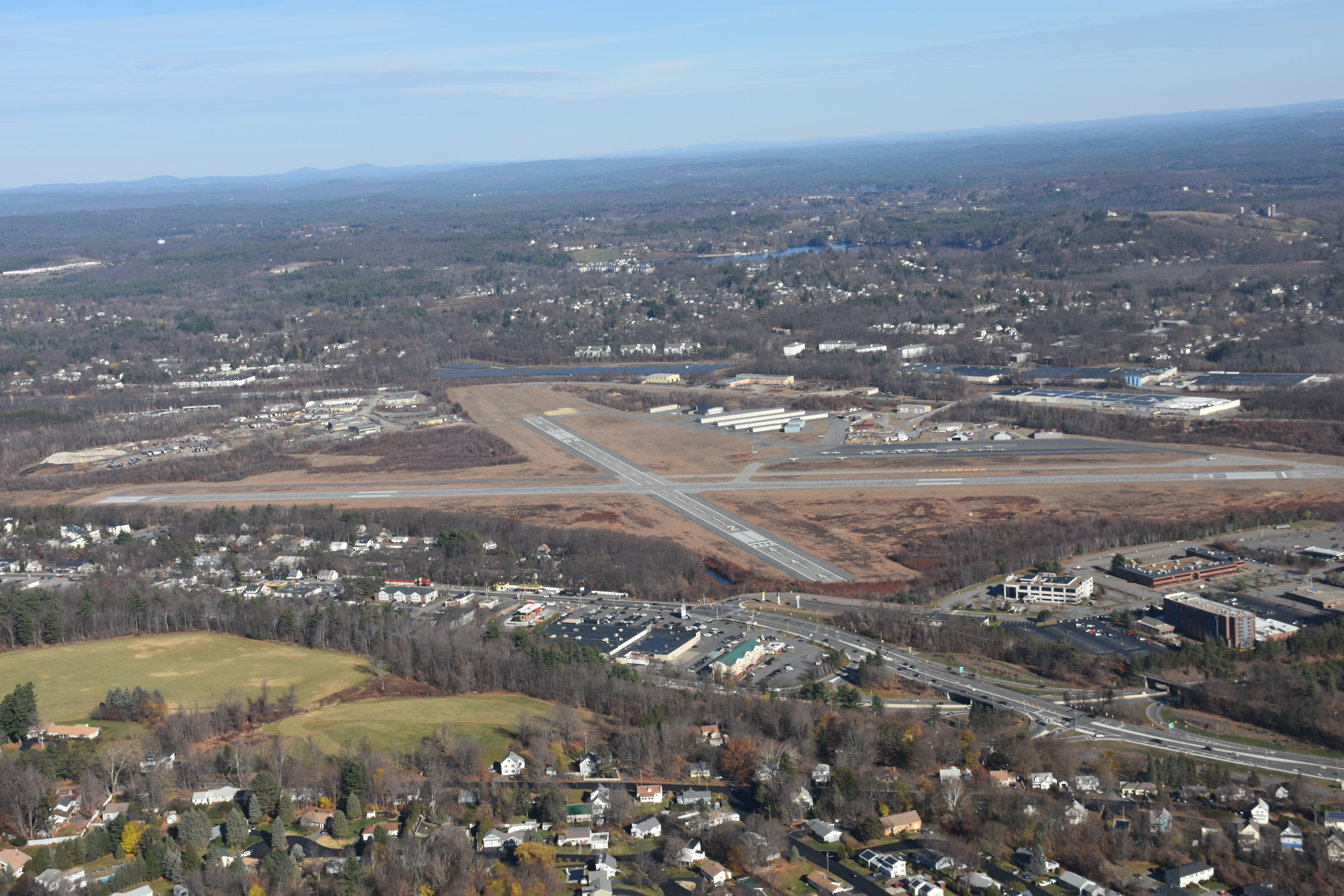
Aerial view of Fitchburg Airport prior to the removal of runway 2/20

Fitchburg Municipal Airport covers an area of 376 acres (152 ha) which contains one paved runway: 14/32 measuring 5,001 x 100 ft (1,524 x 30 m). The airport is also served by two FBOs Autumn Air services and Twin City Airmotive. The airport is home to FCA flight center which operates a fleet of various Cessna aircraft for flight training and Cirrus aircraft for rentals.

For the 12-month period ending May 14, 2020, the airport had 13,200 aircraft operations, an average of 36 per day: 99% general aviation, 1% air taxi and <1% military. There was at the time 100 aircraft based at this airport: 90 single engine, 6 multi-engine, 1 jet aircraft, 1 gliders and 2 ultralight.

== Fitchburg Pilots Association ==
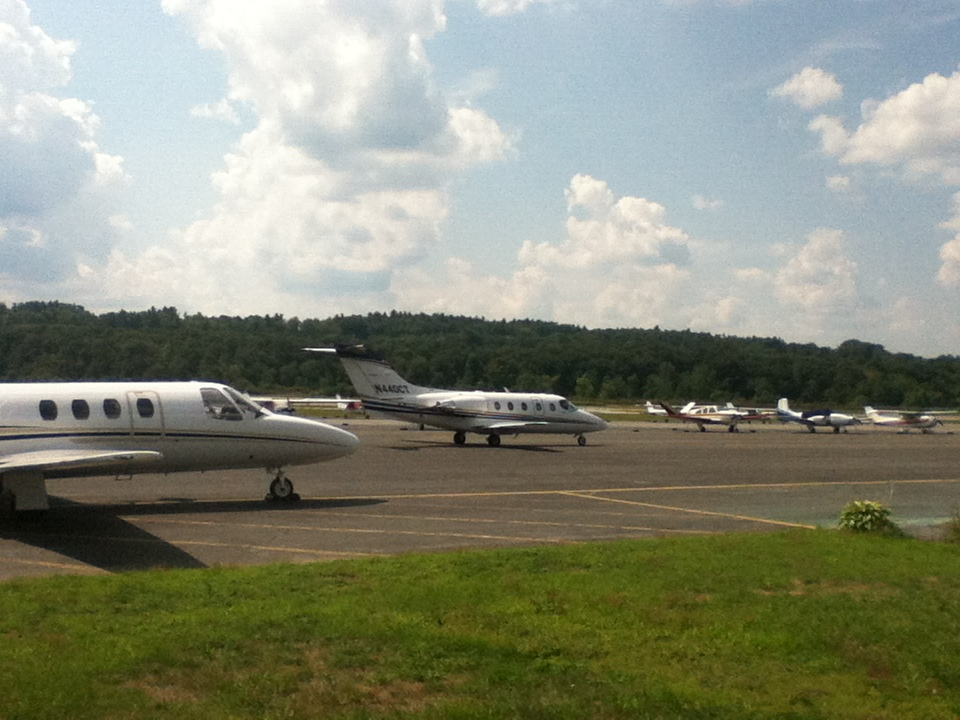
A Beechjet 400 passing a Cessna Citation I on the ramp

Fitchburg Pilots Association/EAA 1454 is an EAA chapter located at the airport. This group host many events a year such as Young Eagles events where local pilots give out free flights for children ages 8–17. During these events as many as 125 children have been given flights per event. The group has also hosted a tour stop for EAA's Ford Trimotor as a tour stop where people could walk through the aircraft, take pictures, and go for flights. During the aftermath of Hurricane Sandy the group flew supplies to New York and New Jersey to help the victims who were displaced by the storm. The group is planning on constructing a new hangar to host their monthly meetings and other events. They plan to build their hangar next to the parking lot to allow access to the public.

== Airlines and destinations ==
Fitchburg Airport is currently not served by any scheduled airlines nor has it had any for more than 40 years since Northeast Airlines was bought by Delta Air Lines. However, many charter airlines, such as Netjets, frequently use this airport for operations. The airport is also the base for Bullock Charter which operates a fleet of two Learjets for charter operations and Skyline Flight which operates a fleet of Cirrus for local Air Taxi.

In the past these airlines served Fitchburg Airport:

- Northeast Airlines
- Wachusett Airways
- Fitchburg-Leominster Airways
- Wiggins Airways

== Ground transport ==
=== MBTA commuter and Pan Am Railways freight rail ===
The airport's main terminal is relatively close to two stations along the MBTA's Fitchburg Line. The airport is roughly 1.6 miles from the North Leominster station, or 3.5 miles from the larger Fitchburg Commuter Rail station (and its associated Fitchburg Intermodal Transportation Center). Just to north of the airport is a rail yard owned by regional railroad company Pan Am Railways.

== Accidents at or near FIT ==
- On April 4, 2003, a Beechcraft King Air operated by FS Corsair Inc. crashed into a building on approach 1 mile SE of Fitchburg Airport because of a low altitude maneuver using an excessive bank angle causing a stall and the pilot being impaired by prescription medications. Six out of the seven occupants on board were killed.

== See also ==
- List of airports in Massachusetts
- Gardner Municipal Airport
- Hanscom Field
- Sterling Airport
- Worcester Regional Airport
