= Boston Airport =

Boston Airport may refer to:

== Serving Boston, Massachusetts (Greater Boston), United States ==
- Boston Logan International Airport
- Rhode Island T. F. Green International Airport
- Manchester–Boston Regional Airport
- Worcester Regional Airport

=== Private and military air traffic ===
- Hanscom Air Force Base
- Hanscom Field

=== Defunct airports ===
- Boston Metropolitan Airport
- Revere Airport

== Serving New Brunswick, Canada ==
- Boston Brook Airport

== See also ==
- List of airports in Massachusetts
- List of cities with more than one commercial airport
