= List of Fliers' & Explorers' Globe Signers =

This is a list of individuals who signed the American Geographical Society Fliers' & Explorers' Globe and date of signing:

2026 Fliers and Explorers Globe Signing Ceremony, 15 September 2026, New York City:

- Kathryn D. Sullivan

2012 Fliers and Explorers Globe Signing Ceremony, 10 April 2012, St. Petersburg, Russian Federation:

- Alexei Leonov
- Valentina Tereshkova

2008 Fliers and Explorers Globe Signing Ceremony, 12 February 2008, Newark, Delaware:

- Lawson Brigham

2006 Fliers and Explorers Globe Signing Ceremony, 21 November 2006, Kalamazoo, Michigan:

- Mary Meader

2005 Fliers and Explorers Globe Signing Ceremony, 14 December 2005, New York City:

- Jennie Darlington

2004 Fliers and Explorers Globe Signing Ceremony, March 31, 2004, New York City:

- Bryan Allen
- William R. Anderson
- Liv Arnesen
- Ann Bancroft
- Sylvia Earle
- Edith Ronne
- Junko Tabei

2000 Fliers and Explorers Globe Signing Ceremony, 11 December 2000, New York City:

- Walter Pitman
- William Ryan
- Brian Jones (aeronaut)
- Bertrand Piccard
- Don Walsh
- Neil Armstrong

1937 Fliers and Explorers Globe Signing Ceremony:

- Roald Amundsen
- William Anders
- Fred Austin
- Bernt Balchen
- Robert Bartlett
- William Beebe
- Alexander Belyakov
- Maurice Bellonte
- Russell Boardman
- Frank Borman
- Louise Arner Boyd
- William S. Brock
- Richard Byrd
- Clarence Chamberlin
- Valeri Chkalov
- Dieudonné Costes
- Jacques De Sibour
- Violette De Sibour
- Amelia Earhart
- Hugo Eckener
- Lincoln Ellsworth
- Charles Evans
- Harrison Finch
- James Fitzmaurcie
- P Gaffney
- Harold Gatty
- John Glenn
- Lawrence Gould
- Keith Greenaway
- Albert A. Hegenberger
- Matthew Henson
- Edmund Hillary
- Herbert Hollick-Kenyon
- Gunther von Huenefeld
- Charles Kingsford Smith
- Herman Koehl
- Joseph Le Brix
- Richard Light
- Charles Lindbergh
- Jim Lovell
- George Lowe
- Harry Lynch
- Harry Lyon
- Lester Maitland
- Jack L. Martin
- James Mollison
- Robert Cushman Murphy
- Fridtjof Nansen
- Erik Nelson
- Raymond Orteig
- Russell Owen
- Robert Peary
- Carl O. Petersen
- John Polando
- Wiley Post
- Finn Ronne
- Fred Roots
- Vilhjalmur Stefansson
- Paul-Émile Victor
- Wolfgang von Gronau
- Leigh Wade
- 1928 - Hubert Wilkins
- J. Tuzo Wilson
- Walter Wood
- James Wordie
