= Grafton Airport =

Grafton Airport could refer to:

- Clarence Valley Regional Airport, formerly named Grafton Airport
- Grafton Airport (Massachusetts), a closed airport in Massachusetts
