= Colgan Air Flight 9446 =

2003 aviation accident in Massachusetts

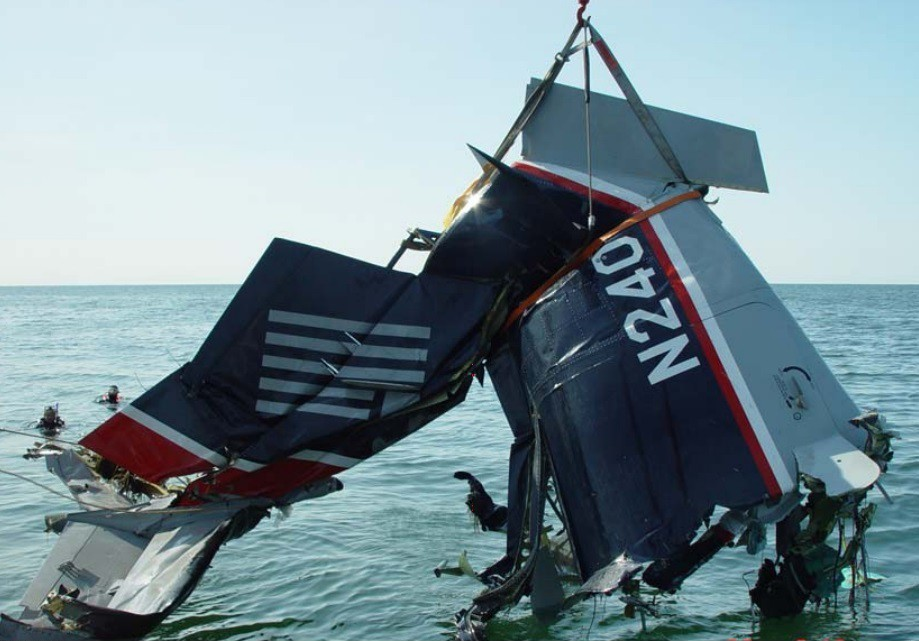
- Wreckage of the tail section being recovered

Accident
- Date: August 26, 2003
- Summary: Crashed shortly after takeoff due to maintenance error and pilot error
- Site: Yarmouth, Massachusetts, United States; 41°37′N 70°15′W

Aircraft
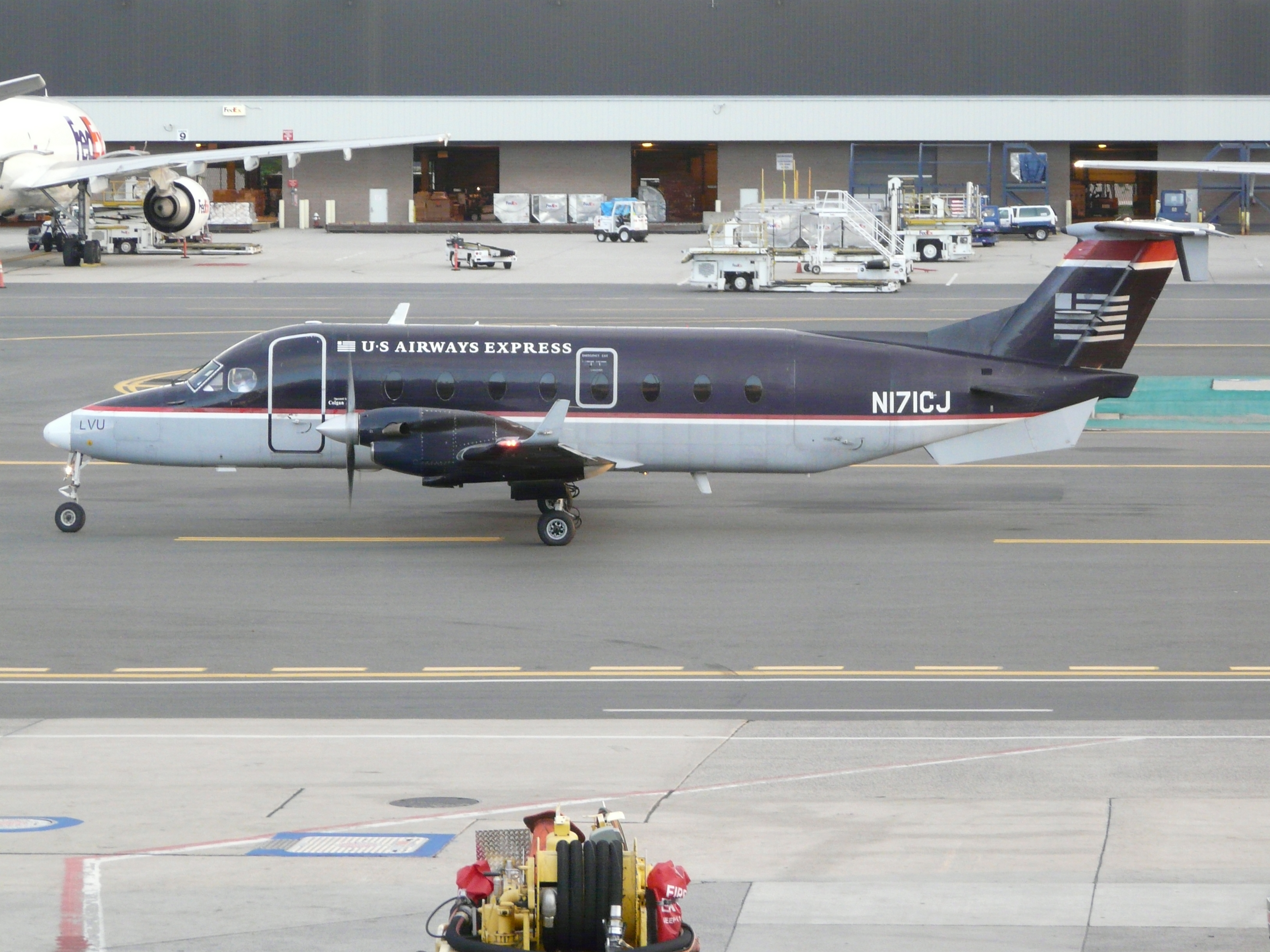
- A Colgan Air Beechcraft 1900D similar to the aircraft involved
- Aircraft type: Beechcraft 1900D
- Operator: Colgan Air on behalf of US Airways Express
- IATA flight No.: 9L9446
- ICAO flight No.: CJC9446
- Call sign: COLGAN 9446
- Registration: N240CJ
- Flight origin: Barnstable Municipal Airport, Hyannis, Massachusetts
- Destination: Albany International Airport, Albany, New York
- Occupants: 2
- Passengers: 0
- Crew: 2
- Fatalities: 2
- Survivors: 0

Colgan Air Flight 9446 was a repositioning flight operated by Colgan Air for US Airways Express. On August 26, 2003, the Beechcraft 1900 crashed into water 300 feet (91 m) offshore from Yarmouth, Massachusetts, shortly after taking off from Barnstable Municipal Airport in Hyannis. Both pilots were killed.

== Aircraft and crew ==
Flight 9446 was an unscheduled deadhead flight of a Beechcraft 1900D (registration N240CJ). Built in 1993, the aircraft had just finished receiving maintenance and was being repositioned to Albany, New York to return to revenue service. The two occupants of the plane were its pilots, Captain Scott Knabe (39) and First Officer Steven Dean (38). Captain Knabe had been with Colgan Air for two years and had 2,891 flight hours, including 1,364 hours on the Beechcraft 1900. Dean had been with the airline for less than a year and had 2,489 flight hours, 689 of which were on the Beechcraft 1900. He had notified the airline one week prior to the accident that he planned to leave the company, citing that he was unable to support his family with the pay he received.

== Accident ==
Flight 9446 departed Barnstable Municipal Airport on August 26, 2003, at 15:40 EDT. Shortly after takeoff, the crew declared an emergency and reported a trim problem. The aircraft entered into a left turn and reached an altitude of 1,100 feet (340 m). The pilots requested a return to Barnstable, and air traffic control cleared the flight to land on any runway. The airplane continued its left turn in a nose-up attitude, and then pitched down and crashed into water near the airport.

== Investigation and aftermath ==
The National Transportation Safety Board (NTSB) investigated the accident.

The NTSB determined that Flight 9446 was the first flight after maintenance personnel had replaced the forward elevator trim cable. The maintenance personnel had skipped a step in the maintenance process. In addition, the aircraft maintenance manual depicted the elevator trim drum backwards. As a result, the trim system was configured in a manner that caused the trim wheels in the cockpit to move in the correct direction, but the actual trim tab (which controlled the flight control surfaces) moved in the opposite direction.

The NTSB also determined that the pilots did not notice the maintenance error because the captain failed to perform a preflight checklist, which included an elevator trim check. The pilots manually set nose-up trim prior to departure. However, because of the improper maintenance, this set the elevator trim to the full nose-down position.

The NTSB determined that it would have taken 250 pounds of force on the control yoke for the pilots to keep the plane airborne, making a safe landing nearly impossible. Investigators programmed a flight simulator with the improper trim settings and made six simulated flights. Five attempts resulted in crashes shortly after takeoff; in one attempt, the simulator pilot could circle for a landing but impacted terrain while attempting to land.

The NTSB published its findings and determination of probable cause on August 31, 2004. The NTSB determined that the probable causes of the accident were the maintenance crew's improper replacement of the forward elevator trim cable and the subsequent inadequate functional check of the maintenance performed. The NTSB also identified the flight crew's failure to follow the checklist procedures and the aircraft manufacturer's erroneous depiction of the elevator trim drum in the maintenance manual as contributing to the accident.

After the NTSB's final report was published, Aero News Network observed that Beechcraft 1900D maintenance manuals were considered accident factors in two previous fatal accidents. However, Raytheon, the owner of Beechcraft, denied blame for the crash of Flight 9446, and a company spokesman said that the accident would not have happened without the Colgan Air maintenance crew's mistakes.

== In popular culture ==
The crash of Colgan Air Flight 9446 was featured in the 2024 episode "Pitch Battle", of the Canadian-made, internationally distributed documentary series Mayday, also known as Air Disasters.
