= Minute Man Air Field =

Public airport in Stow, Massachusetts, United States

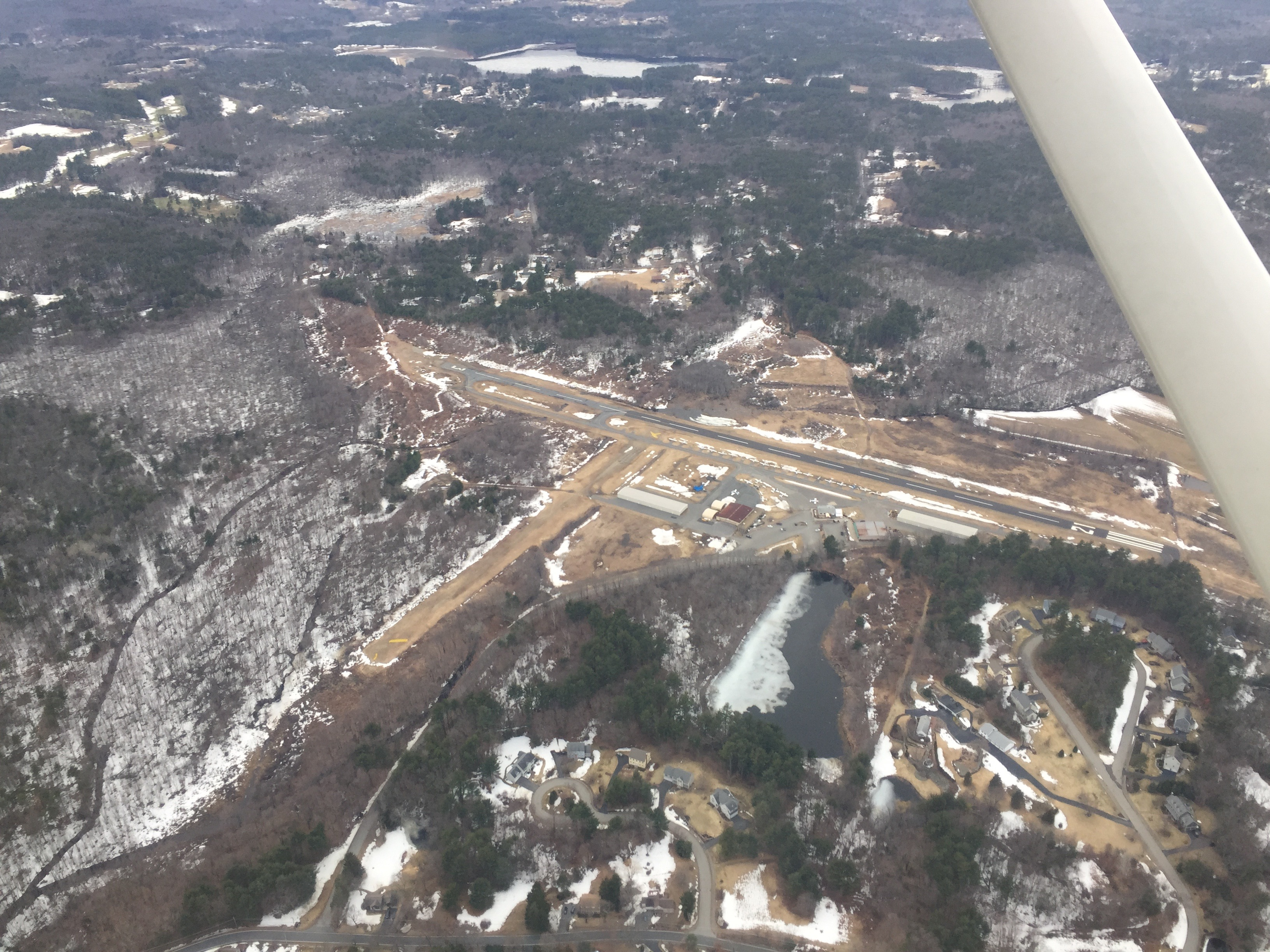
- Aerial photo of Minute Man Air Field
- IATA: MMN; ICAO: none; FAA LID: 6B6

Summary
- Airport type: Public
- Owner: Minute Man Airfield, Inc.
- Operator: Don McPherson
- Serves: Stow
- Location: 302 Boxboro Road; Stow, Massachusetts; U.S.
- Opened: 1963 (63 years ago) as Erikson Field; July 1, 1969 (57 years ago) as Minute Man Air Field
- Elevation AMSL: 268 ft / 82 m
- Coordinates: 42°27′38″N 071°31′04″W
- Website: Official website

Map
- Interactive map of Minute Man Air Field

Runways
Direction	Length		Surface
Direction	ft	m	Surface
3/21	3,110	948	Asphalt
12/30	1,600	488	Turf/gravel

Statistics (2009)
- Aircraft operations: 48,095
- Based aircraft: 67
- Source: Federal Aviation Administration

Minute Man Air Field (IATA: MMN, FAA LID: 6B6) is a public-use airport in Stow, Massachusetts, United States. The airport is privately owned by Minute Man Airfield, Inc.

== History ==
Started as a 1,700 ft (520 m) grass landing strip known as Erikson Field in 1963 by local pilots, the airport was purchased by Paul McPherson in 1966. McPherson and his son, Don, paved and extended the 2,000 ft (610 m) runway, added a parallel taxiway and tie-downs for 50 planes, installed AVGAS pumps, and constructed the Operations Building. The former grass strip was re-opened as Minute Man Air Field on July 1, 1969. McPherson's wife and daughter later opened a small coffee shop on the field called "Peg's Place".

Over the decades, the airport has added aircraft maintenance and storage hangars, a runway extension, a second cross-wind runway, and aircraft parking aprons. In the early 1990s, 100 acres (0.40 km^{2}) of land was added to the field's land holdings, instead of becoming a housing development. The open space is being farmed and serves as home to many species of wildlife. This acreage was sold and is the site of a proposed 55+ active adult neighborhood consisting of 60+ housing units.

Minute Man now has a 3,110 ft (950 m) paved, lighted and instrumented runway and a 1,600 ft (490 m) gravel-visual runway.

The airfield is home to more than 70 aircraft stored in three hangars and on tie-downs along the taxi-ways and aprons. In addition to Fourth and Field, the airfield restaurant, the airport is home to numerous other businesses.

The airport is still owned and operated by Don McPherson.

== Facilities and aircraft ==
Minute Man Air Field covers an area of 225 acres (91 ha) which contains two runways:

- Runway 3/21: 3,110 ft × 48 ft (948 m × 15 m), asphalt
- Runway 12/30: 1,600 ft × 70 ft (488 m × 21 m), turf/gravel

For the 12-month period ending 1 August 2009 the airport had 48,095 aircraft operations, an average of 132 per day: 99% general aviation, <1% air taxi and <1% military. There are 67 aircraft based at this airport: 60 single engine, one multi engine, three helicopters and three ultralights.

The runway was repaved (to meet FAA required standards for safety) in the summer of 2015. The work also included removing a small hill which was a danger to people in airplanes landing from the south.

== Gallery ==
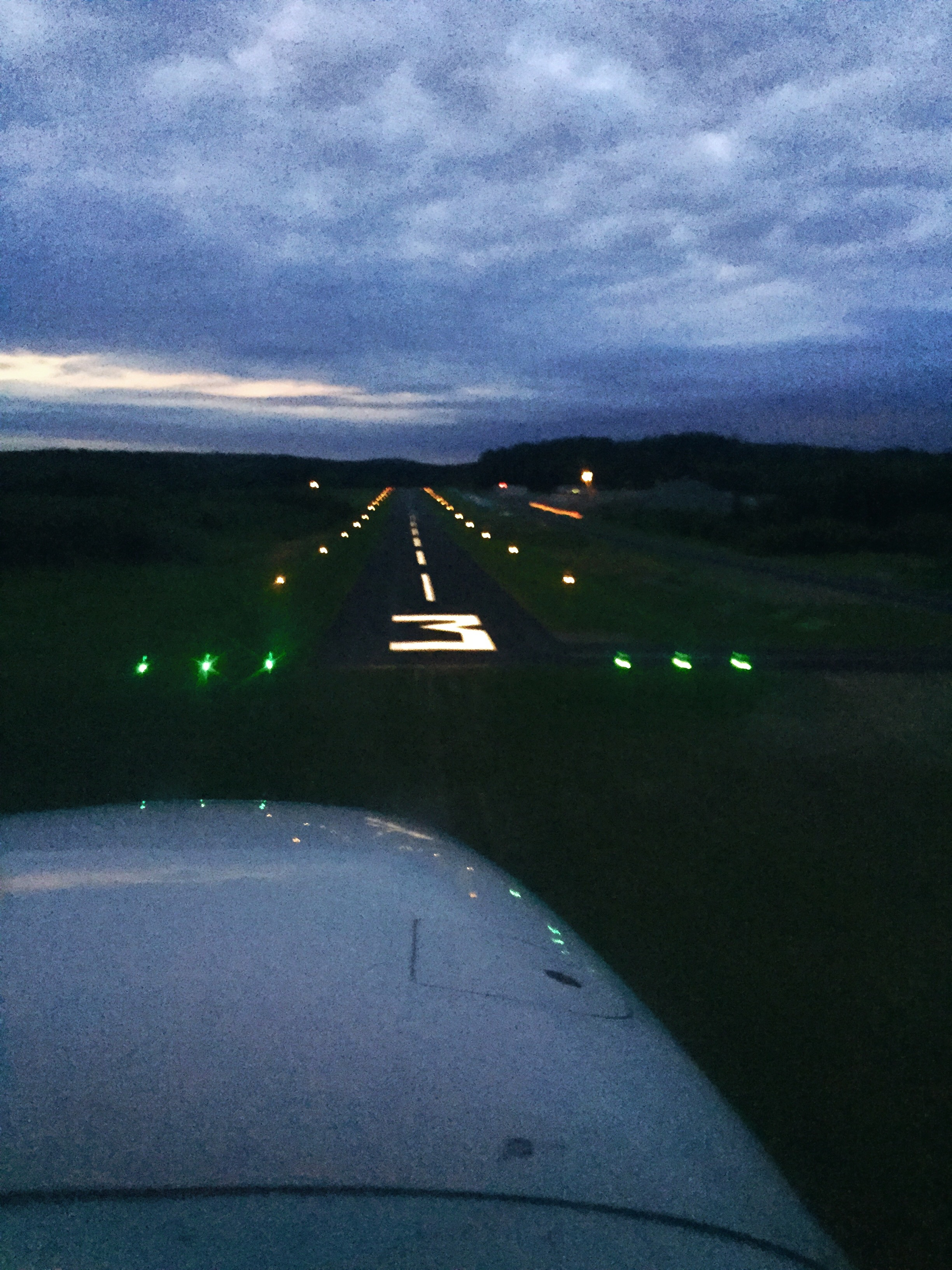
Dusk approach into runway 3 at Minute Man Airfield in a Cessna 172 with the runway lights visible

== See also ==
- List of airports in Massachusetts
