= Hopedale Industrial Park Airport =

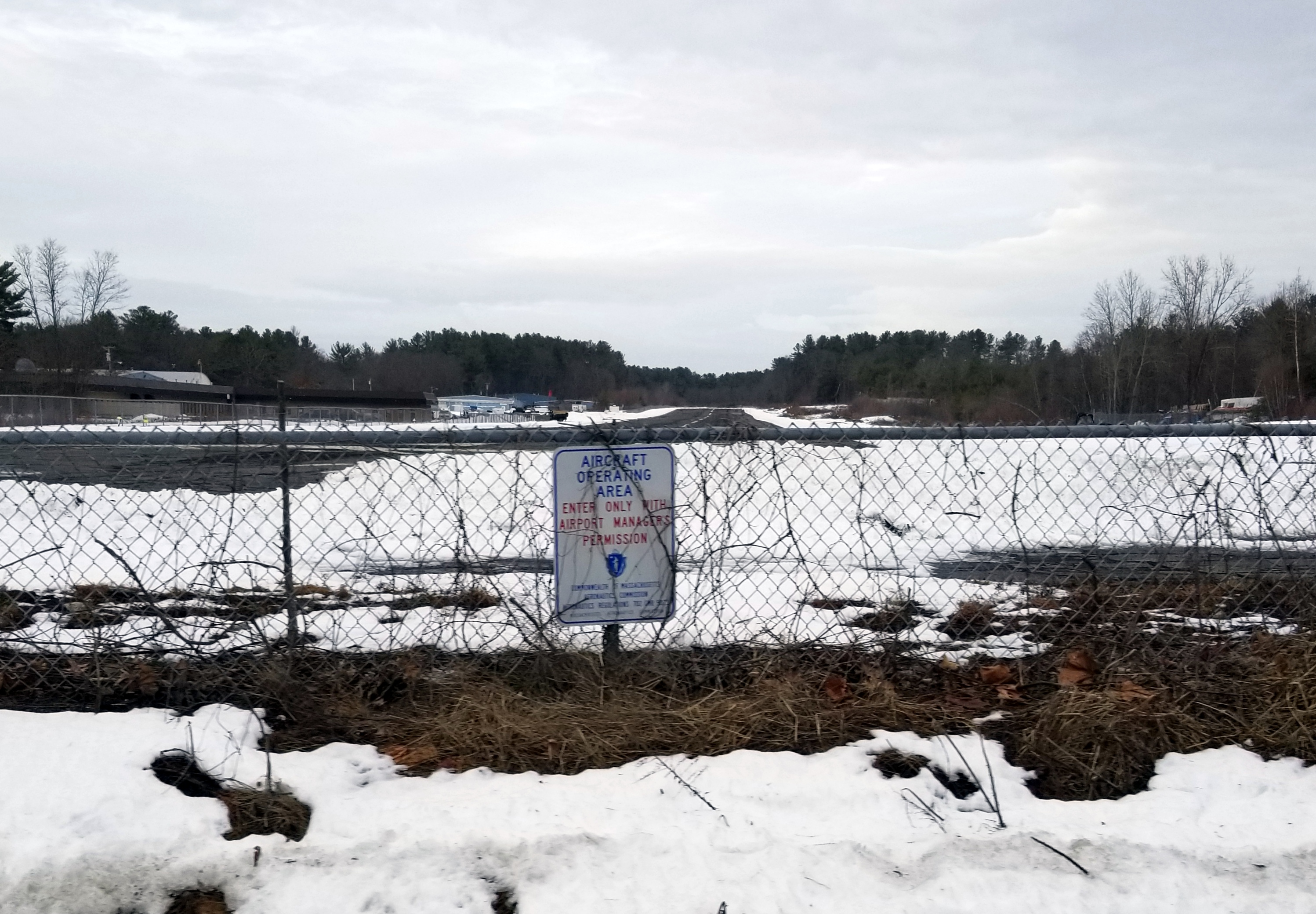
- IATA: none; ICAO: K1B6; FAA LID: 1B6

Summary
- Airport type: Private
- Operator: Hopedale Industrial Park
- Location: Hopedale, Massachusetts
- Elevation AMSL: 269 ft / 82 m
- Coordinates: 42°06′23.3490″N 71°30′36.32″W
- Website: www.hopedaleindustrialpark.com

Map
- Interactive map of Hopedale Industrial Park Airport

Runways
Direction	Length		Surface
Direction	ft	m	Surface
18/36	3,172	967	Asphalt

Hopedale Industrial Park Airport (ICAO: K1B6, FAA LID: 1B6), in Hopedale, Massachusetts, is a private airport open to the public. It is owned by the Hopedale Industrial Park. It has one runway and sees very low traffic. Approximately sixteen aircraft are based at Hopedale. At one point, it housed a flight school and offered plane rentals.

== See also ==
- List of airports in Massachusetts
