= Spencer Airport =

- IATA: none; ICAO: K60M; FAA LID: 60M

Summary
- Airport type: Public
- Operator: Jennifer Andrews
- Location: Spencer, Massachusetts
- Elevation AMSL: 1,040 ft / 317 m
- Coordinates: 42°17′25.8000″N 71°57′52.90″W

Map
- Interactive map of Spencer Airport

Runways
| Direction | Length | | Surface |
| Direction | ft | m | Surface |
|---|---|---|---|
| 1/19 | 1,898 | 594 | Asphalt |

Spencer Airport (ICAO: K60M, FAA LID: 60M) in Spencer, Massachusetts, United States, is a public airport founded in December 1946 by Carl Andrews and remains owned by his family. It is currently owned by Jennifer Andrews, whose husband, Gregg E. Andrews, was killed in a plane crash at the airport on Dec 22, 2010. His plane lost power on takeoff, and the wing collided with a tree about 850 feet from the departure end of the runway. Gregg was Carl Andrew's grandson.

Spencer Airport is currently in disrepair. Its single runway (numbered 1/19) is approximately 1900 ft long, but is uneven and ill-maintained. The airport is unattended, but it remains open to the public.

== See also ==
- List of airports in Massachusetts
