= Myricks Airport =

Airport in Berkley, Massachusetts

- IATA: none; ICAO: K1M8; FAA LID: 1M8

Summary
- Airport type: Public
- Owner: Myricks Airfield Foundation
- Operator: Jean Harley
- Location: Berkley, Massachusetts
- Elevation AMSL: 71 ft / 21.6 m
- Coordinates: 41°50′20.6000″N 71°01′35.30″W

Map
- Interactive map of Myricks Airport

Runways
Direction	Length		Surface
Direction	ft	m	Surface
9/27	2,466	752	Turf

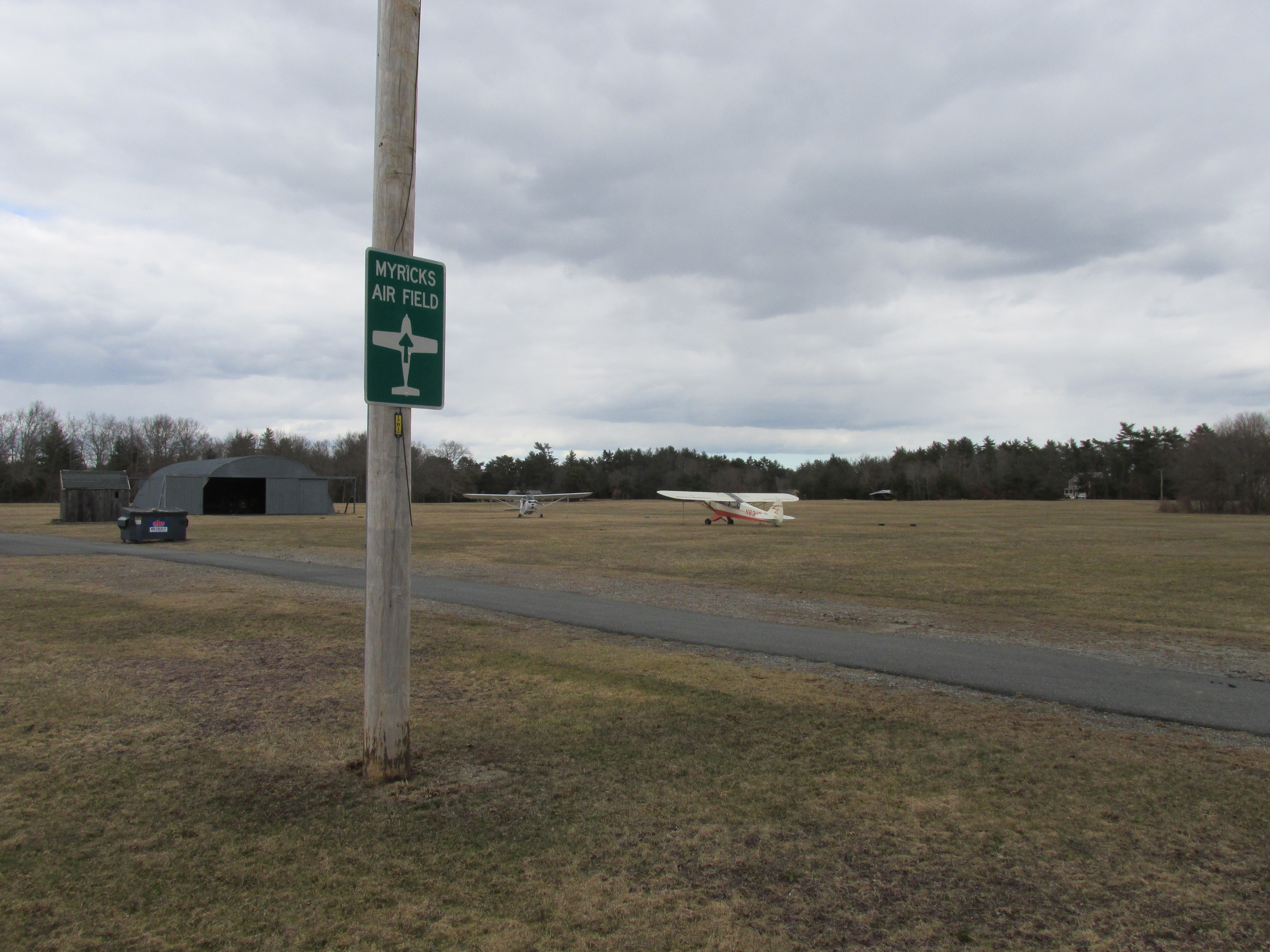
Myricks Air Field, Myricks Massachusetts

Myricks Airport, (ICAO: K1M8, FAA LID: 1M8) in Berkley, Massachusetts, is a historic, public airport owned by the Myricks Airfield Foundation. It has one turf runway (9/27), averages 59 flights per week, and has approximately two aircraft based on its field.

== See also ==
- List of airports in Massachusetts
