= Lawrence Municipal Airport (Massachusetts) =

- IATA: LWM; ICAO: KLWM; FAA LID: LWM

Summary
- Airport type: Public
- Owner: City of Lawrence
- Serves: Lawrence, Massachusetts
- Location: North Andover, Massachusetts
- Elevation AMSL: 148 ft / 45 m
- Coordinates: 42°43′02″N 071°07′24″W
- Website: lawrencemunicipalairport.com

Map
- Interactive map of Lawrence Municipal Airport

Runways
| Direction | Length | | Surface |
| Direction | ft | m | Surface |
|---|---|---|---|
| 5/23 | 5,001 | 1,524 | Asphalt |
| 14/32 | 3,654 | 1,114 | Asphalt |

Statistics (2019)
- Aircraft operations: 39,755
- Based aircraft: 169
- Source: Federal Aviation Administration

Lawrence Municipal Airport (IATA: LWM, ICAO: KLWM, FAA LID: LWM) is two miles east of Lawrence, in Essex County, Massachusetts, United States. It is owned by the City of Lawrence, though it is in North Andover.

Northeast DC-3s stopped at Lawrence from 1946 to 1965; from 1952 to 1960, it rated nonstops to New York La Guardia.

The airport is home to the Essex County Composite Squadron of the Civil Air Patrol.

== Facilities ==
The airport covers 420 acres (170 ha) and has two paved runways: 5/23 is 5,001 x 100 ft (1,524 x 30 m) and 14/32 is 3,654 x 100 ft (1,114 x 30 m). Fuel is offered by four fixed-base operators.

In 2019, the airport had 39,755 aircraft operations, average 109 per day: 98% general aviation, 1% air taxi, and <1% military. One hundred sixty-nine aircraft were then based at the airport: 140 single-engine, 14 multi-engine, 10 helicopter and five jet.

== Aviation services ==
- Angel Flight New England is a nonprofit, 501(c)(3) tax-exempt corporation that provides free air transportation on private aircraft for patients, as well as blood, organs, and tissues/donors.
- Eagle East Aviation is an owner-operated fixed-base operator (FBO) located on the southwest side of the airport. Eagle East offers many services designed to cater to aspiring pilots on up to corporate jets.
- Four Star Aviation is a family-operated FBO located on the airport's west side. Four Star Aviation specializes in fuel and services to jet operators, piston/turboprop aircraft (airplanes and helicopters), aircraft maintenance, and aircraft sales. Four Star Aviation offers the only self-serve 100LL fueling station in the airport, available 24 hours a day, seven days a week. Four Star Aviation hosts the North Andover Flight Academy and MBM Helicopters, specializing in helicopter training and maintenance.
- Falcon Air Inc. offers fueling, oxygen, parking, aircraft maintenance, modifications, parts, and sales/leasing/brokerage services.
- Lawrence Jet Center: Offers Jet fuel at reasonable price, parking, Hangar service

== Dining ==
The Lawrence Municipal Airport hosted Dominic's Diner from 2014-2025.

== See also ==
- List of airports in Massachusetts
