= Cape Cod (aircraft) =

Single engine six-seat utility aircraft

General information
- Other name(s): The American Legion
- Type: Modified Bellanca CH-300
- Owners: John Polando and Russell Boardman
- Registration: NR761W

History
- Fate: Crashed in 1948

The Cape Cod (Registration: NR761W) was a single engine six-seat utility aircraft that was flown by Russell Boardman and John Polando from New York City to Istanbul in 1931.

== History ==
=== Early history ===
The plane was purchased as a Bellanca CH-300, and was originally named The American Legion. Following a fire which destroyed the aircraft in October 1930, the aircraft was sent back to Bellanca for a repair cost of $25,000 (equivalent to $470,568 in today's dollars). After it was repaired, it was renamed Cape Cod, after the peninsula in Massachusetts where John Polando and Russell Boardman trained for their overseas flight. The plane was then reclassified as a Bellanca Special J-300.

== Record attempt ==
The record attempt took place between July 28 and 30, 1931. John Polando and Russell Boardman took off from Floyd Bennett Field, flying over Newfoundland and dropping The New York Times at lighthouses in the province. Along the way, they also flew over Ireland, Paris, and Munich. They also circled the Swiss Alps at night to avoid crashing into them. While it was originally planned for them to fly to Moscow, it was determined that Istanbul would be easier, because it would allow for them to still break the record.

The distance of 5,011.8 miles (8,065.7 km), over a total of forty nine hours and twenty minutes helped to establish a distance record, was the first known non-stop flight whose distance surpassed either English (5,000 mi) or metric (8,000 km) mark.

The plane itself was shipped back on the SS Exochorda.

=== Later history and conservation ===
The aircraft was later sold to people from Cleveland, Ohio. With the addition of a new motor, and renamed The Clevelander, the plane eventually crashed into the side of a mountain in Mexico, in 1948. Before its record-setting flight, photos of the Cape Cod were taken by Boston Herald photographer Leslie Jones as part of his work for the newspaper, and are preserved in the collection of the Boston Public Library.

== Specifications (Bellanca CH-300) ==
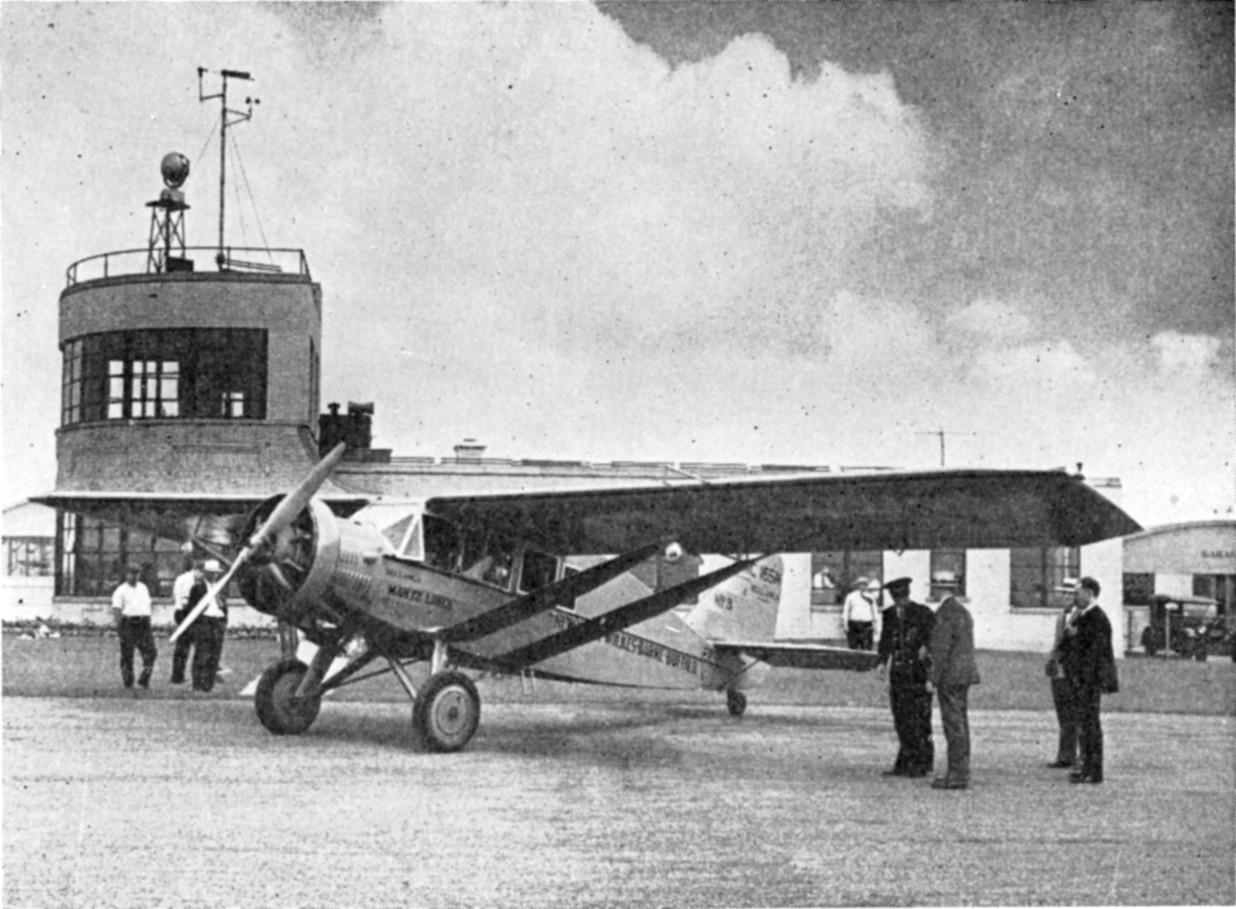
A CH-300, similar to Cape Cod

General characteristics

- Crew: one pilot
- Capacity: 5 passengers
- Length: 27 ft 9 in (8.5 m)
- Wingspan: 46 ft 4 in (14.1 m)
- Height: 8 ft 4 in (2.5 m)
- Empty weight: 2,275 lb (1,032 kg)
- Gross weight: 4,072 lb (1,847 kg)
- Powerplant: 1 × Wright J-6 Whirlwind 9 radial
  with forward-facing exhaust ports

Performance

- Range: 675 mi (1,086 km, 587 nmi)
