= Rectrix Aviation =

IATA	ICAO	Call sign
—	RIX	RECTRIX
- Founded: 2005; 20 years ago
- Commenced operations: 2017; 8 years ago (commercial)
- Ceased operations: 2019; 6 years ago
- AOC #: 6RXA771M
- Fleet size: 2 commuter 7 charter
- Parent company: Ross Aviation
- Headquarters: Concord, MA, United States
- Website: rectrix.aero

Rectrix Aviation was a jet charter and commuter airline service that primarily served New England, Florida and the east coast of the United States. Its commercial operations were primarily based at Nantucket Memorial Airport and Barnstable Municipal Airport in Nantucket and Hyannis, Massachusetts, respectively.

Rectrix Shuttle, the commuter service, was founded when Island Airlines of Nantucket shut down. In December 2019 new parent company Ross Aviation ceased all commercial flights and began the shutdown of the charter department consolidating Rectrix to only an FBO operation.

Rectrix's charter flights were based at Sarasota, Florida, Bedford, Massachusetts, Hyannis, and Westfield, Massachusetts. It got its worldwide jet operating authority in 2009 with its acquisition of New World Jet Corporation.

== Fixed-base operations ==
Rectrix currently has fixed-base operator sat the following locations. Parent company Ross Aviation announced after acquiring that despite complete integration to their network the brand would remain unchanged at current locations for the foreseeable future.

- Laurence G. Hanscom Field - Bedford, MA
- Barnstable Municipal Airport - Hyannis, MA
- Sarasota-Bradenton International Airport - Sarasota, FL
- Westfield-Barnes Regional Airport - Westfield, MA
- Worcester Regional Airport - Worcester, MA

== History ==
On November 4, 2015, Rectrix Aviation purchased Five Star Jet Center at Westfield-Barnes Regional Airport and announced plans to expand its services and staff at the airport, making it the only fixed base operator or FBO at the Westfield-Barnes.

On February 8, 2016; Submitted an application to the Department of Transportation to conduct scheduled air service as a commuter carrier. The application proposed scheduled service between Hyannis, MA (KHYA) and Nantucket, MA (KACK).

On June 26, 2017, Rectrix announced commercial service dubbed the Rectrix Shuttle which connected Worcester Regional Airport and Barnstable Municipal Airport that featured one round-trip flight daily from Thursday to Monday. "It's the first major expansion of Rectrix's current Hyannis to Nantucket shuttle service," the company said.

On October 25, 2017, Rectrix introduced new non-stop scheduled weekend service between Cape Cod and New York City's LaGuardia Airport and Westchester County Airport. Service to Worcester was suspended in the Summer of 2019 due to low demand.

In February 2019, Rectrix was acquired by Ross Aviation. On December 2, 2019, Ross Aviation announced the end of commercial operations and began liquidating their charter department.

== Destinations ==
Rectrix Shuttle flew scheduled charter flights to the following destinations:

Hubs/Focus cities
Future destinations
Seasonal
Terminated destinations

State	City	IATA	Airport	Notes
Massachusetts	Hyannis	HYA	Barnstable Municipal Airport	HUB
Massachusetts	Nantucket	ACK	Nantucket Memorial Airport	Charter service only
Massachusetts	Worcester	ORH	Worcester Regional Airport	Service temporarily suspended
Massachusetts	Vineyard Haven	MVY	Martha's Vineyard Airport	Charter service only
New York	White Plains, New York	HPN	Westchester County Airport	Charter service only
New York	New York City/Queens	LGA	LaGuardia Airport	Service temporarily suspended

== Fleet ==
=== Charter ===
The following chart shows all the aircraft owned by Rectrix Aviation that were available for charter.

Charter fleet
Aircraft	In fleet	Orders	Passengers			Routes	Notes
Aircraft	In fleet	Orders	J	Y	Total	Routes	Notes
Lear 45XR	5	—	—	10	10		2,268 sm
Challenger 300	2	—	—	9	9		3568 sm

=== Commuter (Rectrix Shuttle) ===
The following chart shows all the aircraft Rectrix Aviation used for commuter flights.

Commuter fleet
Aircraft	In fleet	Orders	Passengers			Routes	Notes
Aircraft	In fleet	Orders	J	Y	Total	Routes	Notes
Beechcraft King Air 300	2	—	—	9	9		

== See also ==
- List of defunct airlines of the United States
