= Worcester Regional Airport =

Public airport in Worcester, Massachusetts, United States

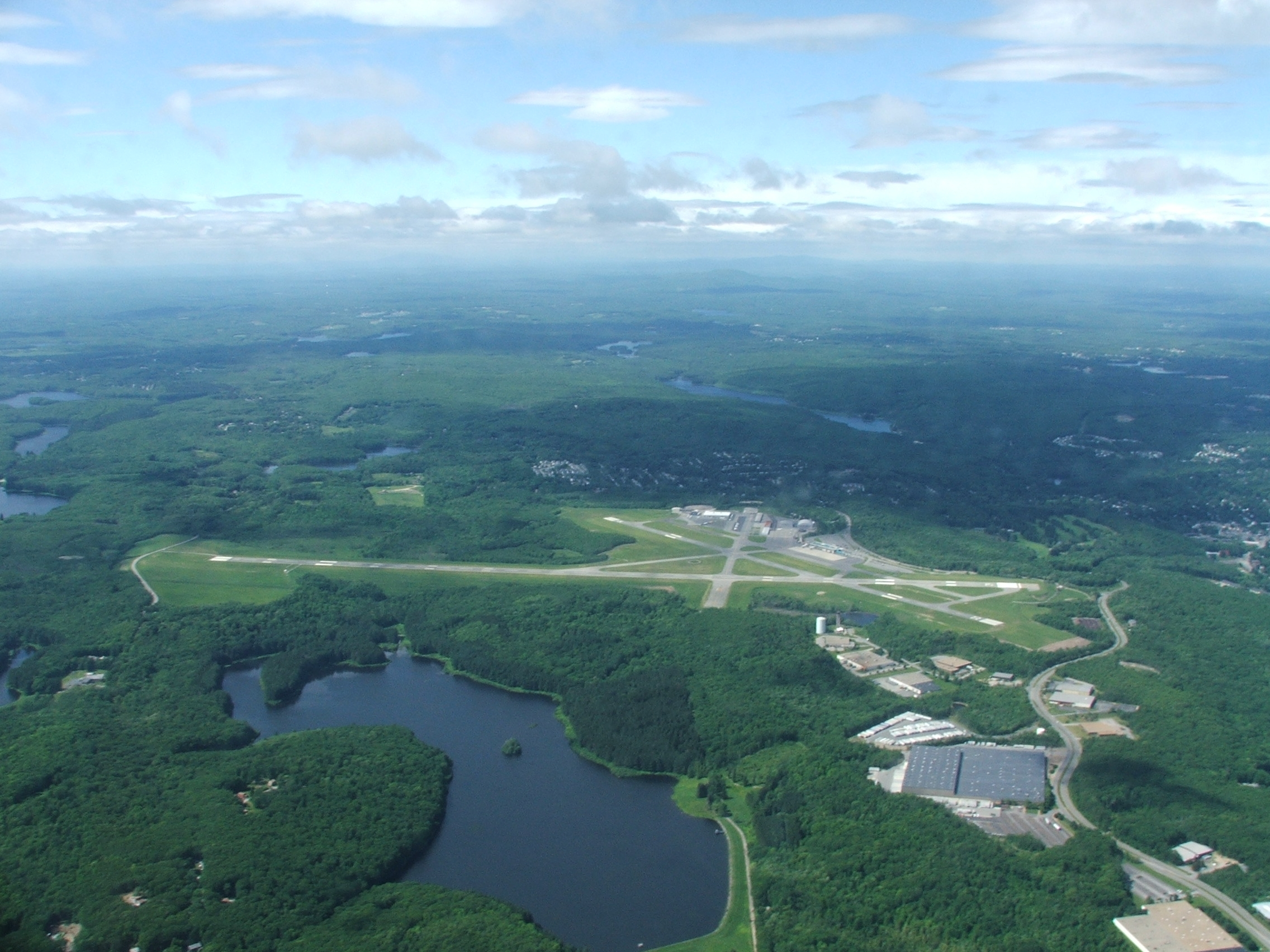
- IATA: ORH; ICAO: KORH; FAA LID: ORH; WMO: 72510

Summary
- Airport type: Public
- Owner: Massachusetts Port Authority (Massport)
- Operator: Massachusetts Port Authority (Massport)
- Serves: Worcester, Massachusetts, Western Greater Boston
- Location: Worcester, Massachusetts
- Elevation AMSL: 1,009 ft (308 m)
- Coordinates: 42°16′02″N 071°52′33″W
- Website: www.massport.com/worcester-airport

Maps
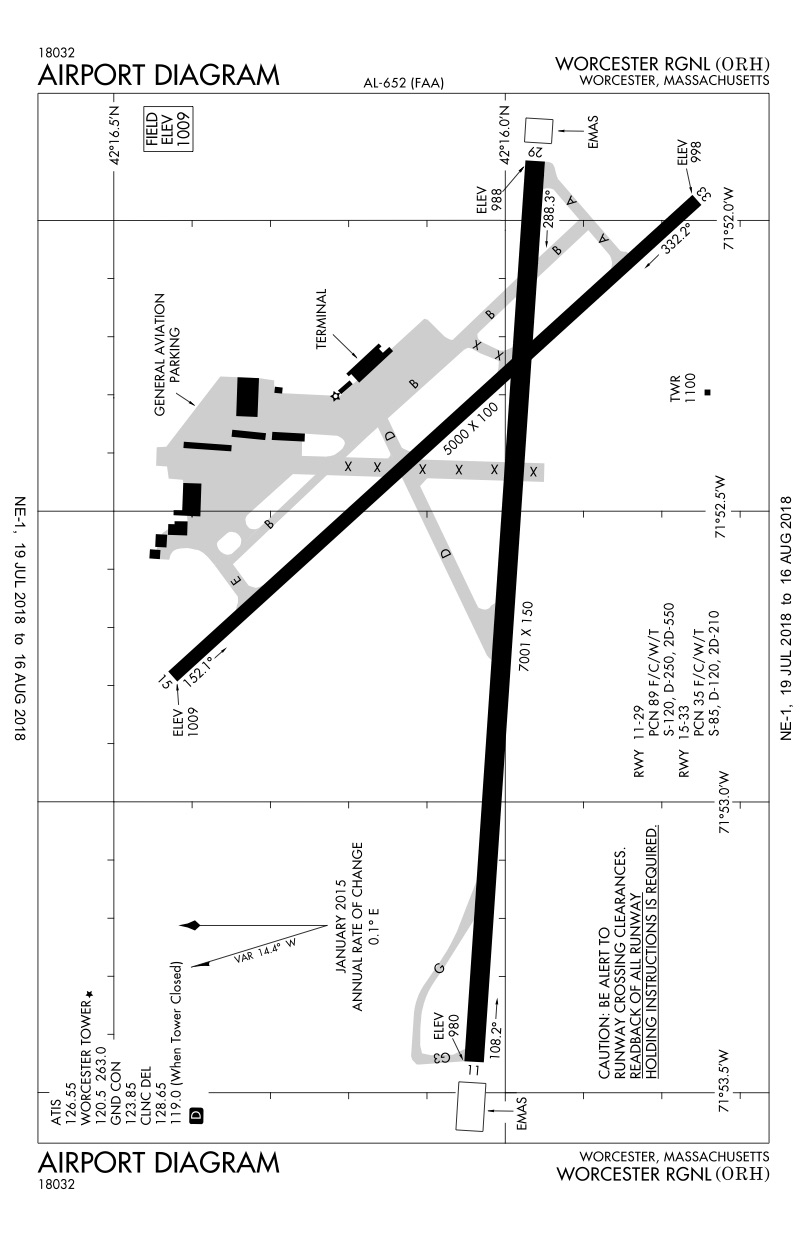
- FAA diagram
- Interactive map of Worcester Regional Airport

Runways
Direction	Length		Surface
Direction	ft	m	Surface
11/29	7,001	2,134	Asphalt/grooved
15/33	5,000	1,524	Asphalt/grooved

Statistics
- Departing passengers (12 months ending Sept. 2017): 54,000
- Aircraft operations (year ending 3/31/2023): 24,376
- Based aircraft (2023): 55
- Source: Federal Aviation Administration

Worcester Regional Airport (IATA: ORH, ICAO: KORH, FAA LID: ORH) is three miles (5 km) west of Worcester, in Worcester County, Massachusetts, United States. The main property lies within municipalities of Worcester and Leicester, with supporting facilities in Paxton. Once owned by the City of Worcester, the airport has been owned and operated by the Massachusetts Port Authority (Massport) since June 2010.

The airport code is believed to have originated from the word "Worcester". "W" cannot be used as the first letter of the identifier for airports in the United States, and "ORC" was already assigned. The origin of the "H" is unclear and might have been arbitrary.

== History ==
=== Early years ===
Worcester's entry into the world of aviation began in 1925, when city officials commissioned a study to examine sites for the city's first airport. On the list of sites was land owned by a wealthy local citizen, Whitin Whitall. In 1927, Whitall, independently of the city commission, set up an airport on his land in North Grafton, 500 feet (150 m) above sea level. This two-runway airport opened for leisure travel on October 12, 1927.

As air travel became more popular, airport expansion was the subject of a second study commissioned by the city. The Grafton airport was deemed too small to accommodate the air travel needs of the region. The location of the present airport, Tatnuck Hill, on the borders of Worcester, Leicester, and Paxton, was high on the commission's list. One problem noted by the commission was the weather: at 1,000-foot (300 m) above sea level, the Tatnuck site was often surrounded by fog. Despite this problem, the city eventually chose Tatnuck as the new site, and construction began in 1944. The airport was ceremoniously opened on May 4, 1946, and started regular passenger service one week later on May 10, 1946. That same year, Northeast Airlines was operating nonstop Douglas DC-3 service to New York Newark Airport, Boston and Lawrence, MA as well as direct one stop DC-3 service to Portland, ME. The Grafton airport remained in operation until 1951, when the owners, due to the dwindling traffic, decided to dismantle the airport. The land was redeveloped as a residential neighborhood. Leicester Airport, a small private airfield also built during the first half-century of aviation, was active until the 1970s. It still sits, now mostly overgrown in the shadow of Worcester Regional which in 1969 was served by Northeast Airlines with McDonnell Douglas DC-9-30 jet and Fairchild Hiller FH-227 turboprop flights nonstop to New York LaGuardia Airport as well as to nearby Boston and Manchester, NH.

Northeast Airlines was then acquired by and merged into Delta Air Lines which in 1973 was continuing to serve Worcester with McDonnell Douglas DC-9-30 jet service nonstop to New York LaGuardia Airport and Manchester, NH as well as direct, no change of plane DC-9 jet service to Atlanta, Boston and New Orleans. By late 1979, Delta was operating all of its flights into Worcester with Boeing 727-200 jetliners with nonstop flights to New York LaGuardia and Manchester in addition to direct, no change of plane 727 jet service to Boston, Houston, Jacksonville, FL, Orlando and Miami. However, Delta was no longer serving the airport by the early 1980s. In 1981, two commuter airlines were serving Worcester: Bar Harbor Airlines operating Convair 600 and Beechcraft 99 turboprop aircraft with nonstop service from New York LaGuardia, Hartford and Manchester, and Precision Airlines operating shuttle service into the airport with thirteen nonstop flights operated every weekday from Boston Logan International Airport (BOS) flown with small Piper Navajo twin engine piston aircraft. Air Vermont also provided service to Albany and Hartford in the early 1980s.

Millions of dollars were spent replacing the old terminal, which hosted a half-dozen airlines before its demolition. In the mid-1980s and early 1990s, major carriers, such as Piedmont, Northwest Airlines, Continental, and USAir all flew mainline jets into Worcester. In addition, smaller carriers, like New York Air and Presidential Airways also had jet service. The small terminal had two ground level jetways built to accommodate the growth. One by one, those carriers left.

=== 2000–2020 ===
In 2001, Pan American Airways (1998–2004) was operating daily nonstop Boeing 727-200 service to Orlando, Florida via the Orlando Sanford International Airport (SFB).

Allegiant Air commenced commercial service to ORH with flights to Orlando/Sanford, Florida (SFB) on December 22, 2005, and expanded to four flights per week in March 2006. Allegiant announced on August 22, 2006, that they would cut ties with the airport, citing high fuel costs and passenger loads in the 80% range as the reason for departure. The announcement of flights ending took people by surprise as service was popular and well-regarded by the flying public throughout Allegiant's entire tenure at the airport.

On September 4, 2008, Direct Air announced they would begin service to Worcester beginning in November 2008, with flights from Orlando/Sanford, Florida and Fort Myers/Punta Gorda, Florida. The flights were originally operated by Virgin America using Airbus A320 aircraft. However, Direct Air was required to return the aircraft in June 2009 to suffice Virgin's rapidly expanding domestic routes. At this point, Direct Air began operating flights using Boeing 737-400s owned by Xtra Airways. Due to this being a wet-lease agreement, there were times where the aircraft was unavailable and other aircraft had to be chartered for the flights. Such examples include service with Airbus A320 from USA 3000 and Boeing 757 from North American Airlines. In March 2009, Direct Air added additional flights to Myrtle Beach, SC. In July 2010, Direct Air expanded their Worcester service further to West Palm Beach, Florida. The airline had further plans to launch flights to San Juan, Puerto Rico, and Nassau, Bahamas, but in March 2012 Direct Air suspended all operations and later filed for Chapter 7 bankruptcy on April 12, 2012.

On April 3, 2013, JetBlue announced daily flights to Orlando, Florida, and Fort Lauderdale, Florida, starting November 7, 2013. This came after over a year of negotiating with the airline that included a competition among local residents to help advertise the city. This became the first mainline service out of Worcester in over a decade. The airline originally operated the 100-seat Embraer 190 for their flights, though in 2023 they were permanently swapped for the 162-seat Airbus A320 upon increased demand. The A320 would then operate all flights out of Worcester for the carrier.

A revamp of the defunct airline Air Florida had planned to fly out of Worcester at the beginning of 2015 as a scheduled charter operation. However, the airline never got off the ground.

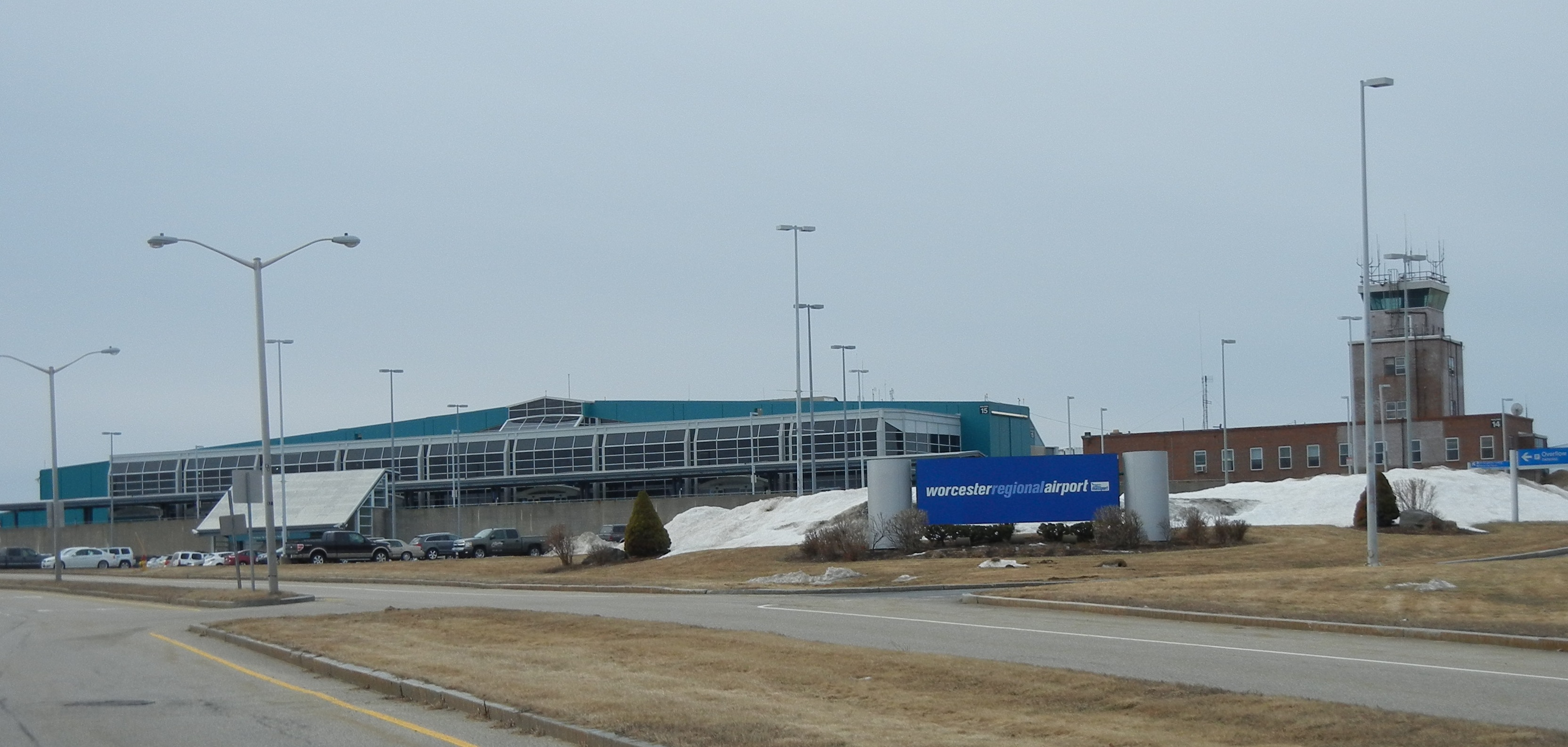
Worcester Regional Airport in 2014

On November 17, 2015, Rectrix Aviation opened a new fixed-base operator building and hangar in Worcester. Rectrix also launched flights between Worcester and Cape Cod in the summer of 2017 with their newly established commercial airline operation, Rectrix Shuttle. After two summers Rectrix replaced Worcester with Westchester County Airport on their route map ending the service after two summers due to low demand.

On February 28, 2017, JetBlue announced it would expand its service at the airport, adding a daily non-stop flight to New York City. JetBlue did not provide a start date, but airline officials said the new flights would not begin until after the landing system was operational. The first revenue flight to New York left Worcester at 6 AM on May 3, 2018. Despite the same reliability found at Logan with the new landing system flights to JFK after three years have been 40-50 percent full. Although JetBlue had later suspended all flights due to the impact of the COVID-19 pandemic on aviation, the airline had announced intentions to resume services at the airport in the future, later announcing service would resume in August 2021.

On April 9, 2018, American Airlines announced it would begin daily non-stop service from Worcester to Philadelphia on October 4, 2018. On June 4, American Airlines announced it would add a second daily flight and would be changing the schedule of the initial flight. The service would operate twice-daily on 50-seat Embraer ERJ-145s. Despite the efforts to add an additional frequency, Piedmont announced in February, only four months into service, a reduction to only one daily flight, starting in June 2019 due to low demand. American has since ended service to Worcester as of June 2020.

On August 28, 2018, Delta Air Lines announced it would begin daily non-stop service from Worcester to Detroit Metropolitan Airport, operated by Delta Connection, which began on August 1, 2019, using 50-seat Canadair CRJ-200 regional jets.

=== 2020–present ===
On January 25, 2020, Delta announced it would begin cutting back flights by dropping its Saturday flight due to low demand. There was initially speculation that the Saturday flight would possibly return in May, but the future of service remained uncertain, with Delta experiencing 50-60 percent loads to Detroit.

By late 2020, as with airports across the rest of the country, Worcester was concentrated on the return to service prior to the COVID-19 pandemic. JetBlue had suspended service indefinitely, while American had once again removed Worcester from its route map and ended service after only two years, leaving Delta as the last airline operating out of Worcester to maintain minimum service through the CARES Act. Although JetBlue had announced intentions to return in the future, both Delta and JetBlue were no longer required to do so by the government after October 1, 2020, once the CARES Act expired.

On January 13, 2021, within the documentation for their Northeast Agreement alliance with American Airlines, it was initially confirmed that JetBlue's station at the airport was closed permanently, along with Oakland and Long Beach, once again leaving Worcester with no scheduled commercial service. JetBlue later announced on May 26, 2021, that it would resume service at the airport, though service to Orlando had yet to resume. Delta Air Lines on August 18, 2021, announced that it would also resume service at the airport through its regional franchise Delta Connection with 75 seats. American Airlines announced on August 28, 2021, that it would resume service to Philadelphia in November, with flights operated by regional franchise American Eagle. However, this was short lived because American announced that they would move its flight from Philadelphia to its hub at New York-Kennedy so it could use their larger Embraer 175's which allowed for premium service and more connections through JetBlue's base at Kennedy and their hub at Kennedy under the Northeast Alliance.

On April 10th, 2023, jetBlue announced they would resume service to Orlando, and begin seasonal service to Fort Myers. Orlando service commenced on June 15th, 2023, and service to Fort Myers commenced on January 4th, 2024. That same year, the airline increased capacity by replacing the Embraer 190 with the Airbus A320.

=== Massport ===
The airport had been under an operating agreement with Massport, the Massachusetts Port Authority, for several years. Under the agreement, the city and Massport paid the operating deficit together.

- July 1, 2004 – June 30, 2005 – Massport pays 100% of operating deficit not including debt service
- July 1, 2005 – June 30, 2006 – Massport pays 85% of operating deficit not including debt service
- July 1, 2006 – June 30, 2007 – Massport pays 68% of operating deficit not including debt service

By law, Worcester had to transfer ownership of the airport to Massport sometime in 2009 or 2010. As of July 1, 2010, Massport became the owner and operator of the airport.

=== Other uses ===
Worcester Regional Airport was used for shooting of the films Captain Phillips, Knight and Day, The Judge and The Sea of Trees.

== Terminal and facilities ==
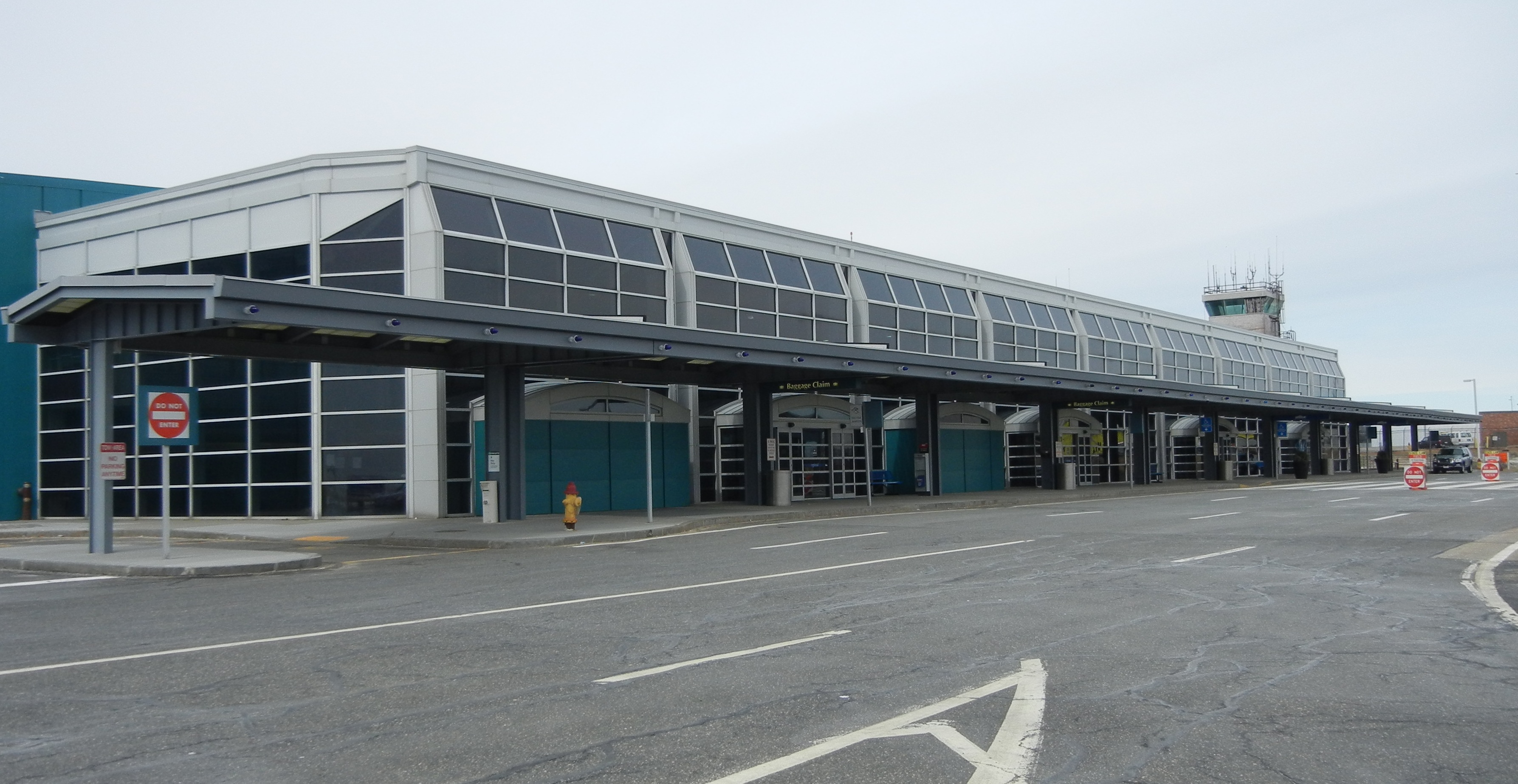
Airport terminal

Worcester Regional Airport covers 1,000 acres (4 km^{2}) and has two runways: 11/29 is 7,001 x 150 ft (2,134 x 46 m) and 15/33 is 5,000 x 100 ft (1,524 x 30 m). Runways 11 and 29 have ILS equipment. EMAS pads are located at the starting thresholds of runways 11 and 29.

The airport passenger terminal has a total of six gates, four with jetways and two ramp level gates for regional carriers. The gates can accommodate aircraft ranging up to a Boeing 757 in size. The terminal has two baggage carousels and a TSA installed passenger and baggage screening system on the first floor. The airport is equipped to handle up to 250,000 passengers a year in the current configuration and can seat up to 400 passengers at any given time. Currently, the airport has four ticket counters, 2 baggage claims, and four on-site rental car companies. Currently, parking is $7 per day at Worcester Regional. Two Mirage Express cafes are located inside the airport.

WBZ-TV operated a Doppler weather radar station at the airport until 2023.

Atlantic Aviation is the fixed-base operator at the airport.

=== Ground transportation ===
Four rental car agencies are located in the terminal building at Worcester Regional Airport. Avis, Budget, Hertz, and Thrifty all have concession stands across from the baggage claim.

The Worcester Regional Transit Authority (WRTA)'s route #2 bus connects Union Station, a regional MBTA Commuter Rail, Amtrak, and bus transportation hub in the Downtown Worcester district, with the airport. Union Station is the western terminus of the Massachusetts Bay Transportation Authority's Framingham/Worcester Line, with eastbound service to Back Bay and South Station in Boston. Additionally, service via Amtrak's Lake Shore Limited Boston section to/from Albany, New York, with connections to Chicago (formerly also the Regional's Inland Route) stops at this location, as does intercity (Peter Pan Bus Lines), (Greyhound Bus Lines), and other local WRTA bus services at Union Station.

The airport presently lacks a direct connection to an Interstate Highway. However, a number of interstate routes such as I-290, I-90, I-190, I-395, I-495, and routes: MA-9, MA-122, and MA-146 provide access through smaller access roads. Travel time to reach the airport is approximately 5–10 minutes after exiting Interstate I-290, Worcester's primary access via interstate highway from the north and the south also with direct access to the Massachusetts Turnpike.

=== Category III landing system ===
On April 28, 2016, Massport approved funding for the installation of a Category IIIb instrument landing system at ORH. The geographic location of the airport, on top of the tallest hill in the city reaching approximately 1,000 feet above sea level, leaves Worcester on average with 40 more days of fog a year than nearby Boston. The installation of the Category IIIb landing system will allow capable aircraft to land and depart in virtually all weather conditions. The installation of the landing system also included the addition of a jug-handle taxiway at the approach end of Runway 11.

The ILS system was completed in December 2017 and went live on March 19, 2018. Completion of the ILS allowed JetBlue to add a flight from Worcester to New York-JFK, operated with an Embraer 190 aircraft capable of autoland. The same aircraft was used for flights to Ft. Lauderdale and Orlando likewise are also able to use the ILS. However, American's flight to their Philadelphia hub was operated by an Embraer 145 aircraft which was not able to use the newly installed Category III system which led to many weather cancellations and diversions during their second brief tenure. When American moved their route from Philadelphia to their New York-JFK hub, they upgraded the route from the E145 to the Embraer 175 and it was able to use the Category III system.

== Airlines and destinations ==
=== Passenger ===
Airlines	Destinations
American Eagle	Philadelphia
Delta Connection	New York–LaGuardia
JetBlue	Fort Lauderdale, Orlando; Seasonal: Fort Myers

=== Historical service ===
- Northeast Airlines, 1946–1972 (merged with Delta Air Lines)
- Mohawk Airlines, 1965–1971 (merged with Allegheny Airlines)
- Statewide Airlines, 1965–1966
- Executive Airlines, 1969–1972
- Allegheny Airlines, 1971–1975
- Delta Air Lines, 1972–1980, 2019–2020, 2021–
- Pilgrim Airlines, 1974–1975
- Precision Airlines, 1978–1981
- Bar Harbor Airlines, 1980–1998
- Piedmont Airlines, 1986–1989 (merged with US Airways)
- Continental, 1987–1988
- Northwest, 1988–1990
- US Airways Express, 1988–2003
- Continental Express, 1990–1998
- Carnival Air Lines, 1993–1994
- Florida Shuttle, 1993–1994
- United Express, 1998 (April–November)
- Pan American Airways, 2001–2002
- American Airlines, 2000–2002, 2018–2020, 2021–
- Allegiant Air, 2005–2006
- Direct Air, 2008–2012
- JetBlue, 2013–2020, 2021–
- Rectrix Shuttle, 2017–2018

=== Historical service ===
- Bar Harbor, Maine
- Boston
- Manchester, New Hampshire
- Hyannis, Massachusetts
- New York - JFK Airport

== Statistics ==
For the 12-month period ending March 31, 2023, the airport had 24,376 aircraft operations, an average of 66 per day: 76% general aviation, 7% scheduled commercial, 9% military and 9% air taxi. At that time, there were 55 aircraft based at this airport: 49 single-engine, 3 multi-engine, 2 jet, and 1 glider.

On June 10, 2016, JetBlue and the City of Worcester celebrated the 300,000th passenger since beginning service in 2013.

At its peak in 1989, Worcester Airport served about 354,000 passengers in a single year. In 2009, the airport served fewer than 50,000 passengers, though 107,000 passengers used the airport in 2011 and 192,000 in 2019.

During the COVID pandemic which slowed air travel across the globe, the Bureau of Transportation Statistics (BTS) reported that for the period from 1 September 2019 through 31 August 2020, the airport managed to serve over 106,000 passengers, with JetBlue transporting more than 75% of all passengers.

In January 2026, Massport stated in an interview with Spectrum News that he wants more airlines and flights to fly to Worcester, including United Airlines. However, in the same interview he claimed that four out of five flights out of Worcester are not profitable.

=== Annual traffic ===
Annual traffic
	Passengers	Change from previous year	Aircraft operations	Total cargo (freight, express, & mail) (lbs.)
2019	195,035	N/A	0	0
2020	0	▼?%	0	0
2021	27,540	▼?%	0	0
2022	193,000	▲600%	0	0
2023	204,162	▲5.78%	0	0
2024	229,374	▲12%	0	0

=== Top destinations ===
Busiest domestic routes from ORH (August 2025 - July 2026)
Rank	Airport	Enplanements	Carriers
1	Orlando, Florida	46,600	JetBlue
2	Fort Lauderdale, Florida	34,660	JetBlue
3	Fort Myers, Florida	13,570	JetBlue
4	Philadelphia, Pennsylvania	11,600	American
5	(New York (state)) New York-LaGuardia, New York	8,690	Delta

== Accidents and incidents ==
On the morning of October 25, 2015, Dr. Gary Weller crashed his light Mooney M20M plane into nearby woods while attempting to take off in cold weather on Runway 11. The crash, which occurred just south of the airport, was caused by a mechanical crankshift failure, which caused the plane's engine to lose power and subsequently the plane to stall. While there were no ground injuries, Dr. Weller died on the scene.

On February 2, 2021, a Piper PA-46 from Martha's Vineyard crashed in nearby Leicester while attempting an emergency landing at ORH. No one on the ground was injured, but the pilot and two others on board were injured in the crash.

== See also ==
- Worcester Airport Police (defunct)
- List of airports in Massachusetts
