= Pine Hill Airport (Massachusetts) =

- IATA: none; ICAO: none

Summary
- Operator: Private
- Location: Lancaster, Massachusetts
- Built: Unknown
- In use: 1950-Before 1960
- Occupants: Private
- Elevation AMSL: 273 ft / 83 m
- Coordinates: 42°28′11.10″N 71°38′51.98″W
- Interactive map of Pine Hill Airport

Pine Hill Airport was an airfield operational in the mid-20th century in Lancaster, Massachusetts.
