= Haverhill Riverside Airport & Seaplane Base =

- IATA: none; ICAO: none

Summary
- Operator: Private
- Location: Haverhill, Massachusetts
- Built: Unknown
- In use: 1960-Before 1998
- Occupants: Private
- Elevation AMSL: 14 ft / 4 m
- Coordinates: 42°46′11.17″N 71°1′59.09″W
- Interactive map of Haverhill Riverside Airport & Seaplane Base

Haverhill Riverside Airport & Seaplane Base was an airfield operational in the mid-20th century in Haverhill, Massachusetts. The airport was owned and operated by William "Red" Slavit, who died in 2008. The airport code for Haverhill river side airport was MA04.
