= Merrimack Valley Seaplane Base =

Seaplane base in Essex County, Massachusetts, United States

- IATA: none; ICAO: none; FAA LID: MA2

Summary
- Airport type: Public
- Owner: John Wholley
- Location: Methuen, Massachusetts
- Elevation AMSL: 50 ft / 15 m
- Coordinates: 42°42′00″N 071°12′58″W

Map
- Location of airport in Massachusetts

Runways
Direction	Length		Surface
Direction	ft	m	Surface
1/19	5,000	1,524	Water
4/22	4,700	1,433	Water

Statistics (2006)
- Aircraft operations: 4,565
- Source: Federal Aviation Administration

Merrimack Valley Seaplane Base (FAA LID: MA2) is a privately owned, public-use seaplane base located three miles (5 km) west of the central business district of Methuen, a city in Essex County, Massachusetts, United States.

== Facilities and aircraft ==
Merrimack Valley Seaplane Base has two landing areas:

- Runway 1/19: 5,000 x 250 ft. (1,524 x 76 m), Surface: Water
- Runway 4/22: 4,700 x 250 ft. (1,433 x 76 m), Surface: Water

For the 12-month period ending October 1, 2006, the airport had 4,565 general aviation aircraft operations, an average of 12 per day.
