= Sterling Airport =

Airport in Massachusetts, United States of America

- IATA: none; ICAO: none; FAA LID: 3B3

Summary
- Airport type: Public
- Owner: Monadnock Realty Corp
- Serves: Sterling, Massachusetts
- Elevation AMSL: 459 ft / 140 m
- Coordinates: 42°25′33″N 071°47′34″W
- Website: www.sterlingairport.net

Map
- Interactive map of Sterling Airport

Runways
Direction	Length		Surface
Direction	ft	m	Surface
16/34	3,086	941	Asphalt

Helipads
Number	Length		Surface
Number	ft	m	Surface
H1	50	15	Asphalt

Statistics (2010)
- Aircraft operations: 49,260
- Based aircraft: 78
- Source: Federal Aviation Administration

Sterling Airport (FAA LID: 3B3) is a public use airport located two nautical miles (4 km) southwest of the central business district of Sterling, a town in Worcester County, Massachusetts, United States. It is privately owned by Monadnock Realty Corp.

It is a fairly inexpensive place to rent airplanes, as the starting rate is $99/hour for a two-seater Cessna 150. The airport has many parking spaces, open-air and in hangars. The Sterling Airport closes its runways in early September for the Sterling Fair, during which time, all the aircraft tied down on the field must be flown elsewhere. Even the glider trailers are moved off-field. But after the fair, the airport opens for normal operations once again.

Sterling Airport is also the home of the Greater Boston Soaring Club.

== Facilities and aircraft ==
Sterling Airport covers an area of 100 acres (40 ha) at an elevation of 459 feet (140 m) above mean sea level. It has one runway designated 16/34 with an asphalt surface measuring 3,086 by 40 feet (941 x 12 m) and one helipad designated H1 which is 50 by 50 feet (15 x 15 m).

For the 12-month period ending June 1, 2010, the airport had 49,260 aircraft operations, an average of 134 per day: 99% general aviation, <1% air taxi, and <1% military. At that time there were 78 aircraft based at this airport: 37% single-engine, 3% multi-engine, 56% glider, and 4% ultralight.

== See also ==
- List of airports in Massachusetts
