= Haverhill Dutton Airport =

- IATA: none; ICAO: none

Summary
- Operator: Harold Fall, Howard Dutton
- Location: Haverhill, Massachusetts
- Built: early 1920s
- In use: Pre-1929–Before 1986
- Occupants: Private
- Elevation AMSL: 119 ft / 36 m
- Coordinates: 42°48′7.02″N 71°3′43.04″W
- Interactive map of Haverhill Dutton Airport

Haverhill Dutton Airport was an airfield operational in the mid-20th century in Haverhill, Massachusetts. One of the smallest airports in the continental U.S., the runway was 1,500 feet long, and its width was 30 feet, 15 of which was asphalt and the remaining of dirt. The owner-operator, Howard Dutton, lived with his family on the grounds. Dutton was an accomplished barnstormer in the 1930s and had photographs of his biplane stunts from that era hanging in his home.
