= Gardner Municipal Airport (Massachusetts) =

- IATA: GDM; ICAO: KGDM; FAA LID: GDM

Summary
- Airport type: Public
- Owner: City of Gardner
- Location: Templeton, Massachusetts
- Elevation AMSL: 954 ft (291 m)
- Coordinates: 42°33′00″N 72°00′58″W

Map
- Interactive map of Gardner Municipal Airport

Runways
| Direction | Length | | Surface |
| Direction | ft | m | Surface |
|---|---|---|---|
| 18/36 | 3,000 | 914 | Asphalt |

Statistics (2023)
- Aircraft operations (year ending 4/13/2023): 4,420
- Based aircraft: 9
- Source: Federal Aviation Administration

Gardner Municipal Airport (IATA: GDM, ICAO: KGDM, FAA LID: GDM) is a public airport located 2 nmi (3.7 km) southwest of the central business district of Gardner, a city in Worcester County, Massachusetts, United States. This airport is owned by the City of Gardner, and is located in the town of Templeton.

== Facilities and aircraft ==
Gardner Municipal Airport covers an area of 80 acres (32 ha) which contains one asphalt runway (18/36) measuring 3,000 x 75 ft (914 x 23 m). For the 12-month period ending April 13, 2023, the airport had 4,420 aircraft operations, an average of 85 per week: 98% general aviation, 2% military and <1% air taxi. There was at that time 9 aircraft based at this airport: all single-engine.

As of 2025, Lifeflight air ambulance has designated the Gardner Municipal Airport as their new primary landing zone due to a shortage of critical care beds in the region. Traffic has been steadily increasing to two to three flights per day.

== See also ==
- List of airports in Massachusetts
