= Hatfield-Pilgrim Airport =

- IATA: none; ICAO: none; FAA LID: MA03

Summary
- Operator: Private
- Location: Hatfield, Massachusetts
- Built: Unknown
- In use: After 1960-1996
- Occupants: Private
- Elevation AMSL: 129 ft / 39 m
- Coordinates: 42°25′11.17″N 72°35′36.99″W
- Interactive map of Hatfield-Pilgrim Airport

Hatfield-Pilgrim Airport was an airfield operational in the mid-20th century in Hatfield, Massachusetts. Its FAA identifier was MA03.
