= Leicester Airport (Massachusetts) =

- IATA: none; ICAO: none

Summary
- Operator: Private
- Location: Leicester, Massachusetts
- Built: Unknown
- In use: After 1937-Before 1970
- Occupants: Public
- Elevation AMSL: 129 ft / 39 m
- Coordinates: 42°16′33.72″N 71°54′40.60″W
- Interactive map of Leicester Airport

Leicester Airport was an airfield operational in the mid-20th century in Leicester, Massachusetts. It was located adjacent and to the west of the Worcester Regional Airport.
