= North Middleboro Airpark =

- IATA: none; ICAO: none

Summary
- Operator: Private
- Location: North Middleborough, Massachusetts
- Built: Unknown
- In use: After 1954-Before 1994
- Occupants: Private
- Elevation AMSL: 48 ft / 15 m
- Coordinates: 41°55′30.46″N 70°58′34.19″W
- Interactive map of North Middleboro Airpark

North Middleboro Airpark was an airfield operational in the mid-20th century in North Middleborough, Massachusetts.
