= Cape Cod Gateway Airport =

Public airport in Hyannis, Massachusetts, United States

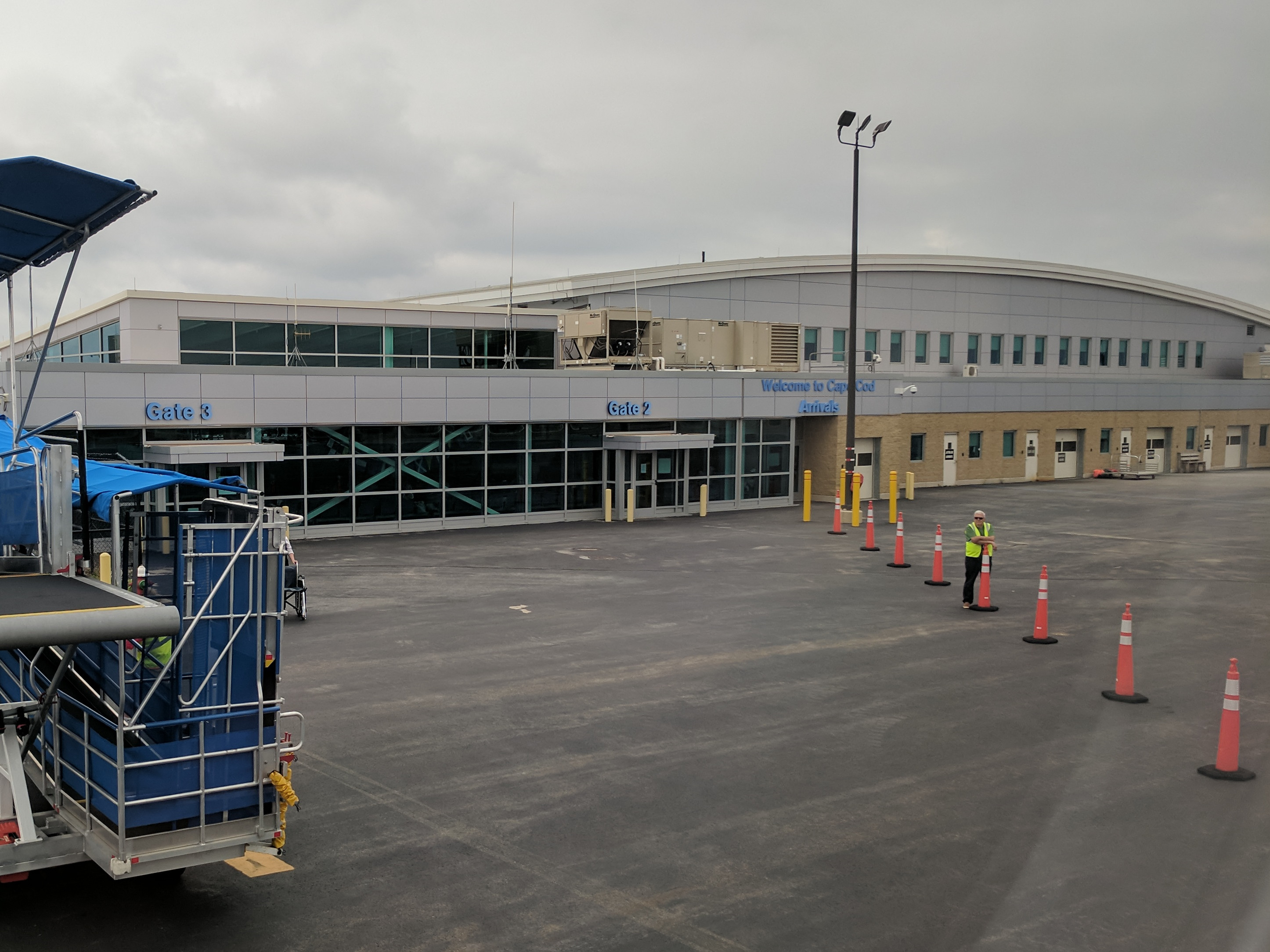
- IATA: HYA; ICAO: KHYA; FAA LID: HYA

Summary
- Airport type: Public
- Owner: Town of Barnstable
- Serves: Hyannis, Massachusetts
- Location: Cape Cod
- Opened: 1928; 98 years ago
- Operating base for: Cape Air; Nantucket Airlines
- Elevation AMSL: 54.1 ft (16.5 m)
- Coordinates: 41°40′10″N 070°16′49″W
- Website: www.flyhya.com

Maps
- FAA airport diagram as of January 2021
- Interactive map of Cape Cod Gateway Airport

Runways
Direction	Length		Surface
Direction	ft	m	Surface
6/24	5,425	1,654	Asphalt
15/33	5,253	1,601	Asphalt

Statistics
- Passenger volume (12 months ending May 2021): 21,700
- Scheduled flights (12 months ending May 2021): 4,918
- Aircraft operations (2017): 65,431
- Based aircraft (2021): 37
- Source: Federal Aviation Administration, BTS

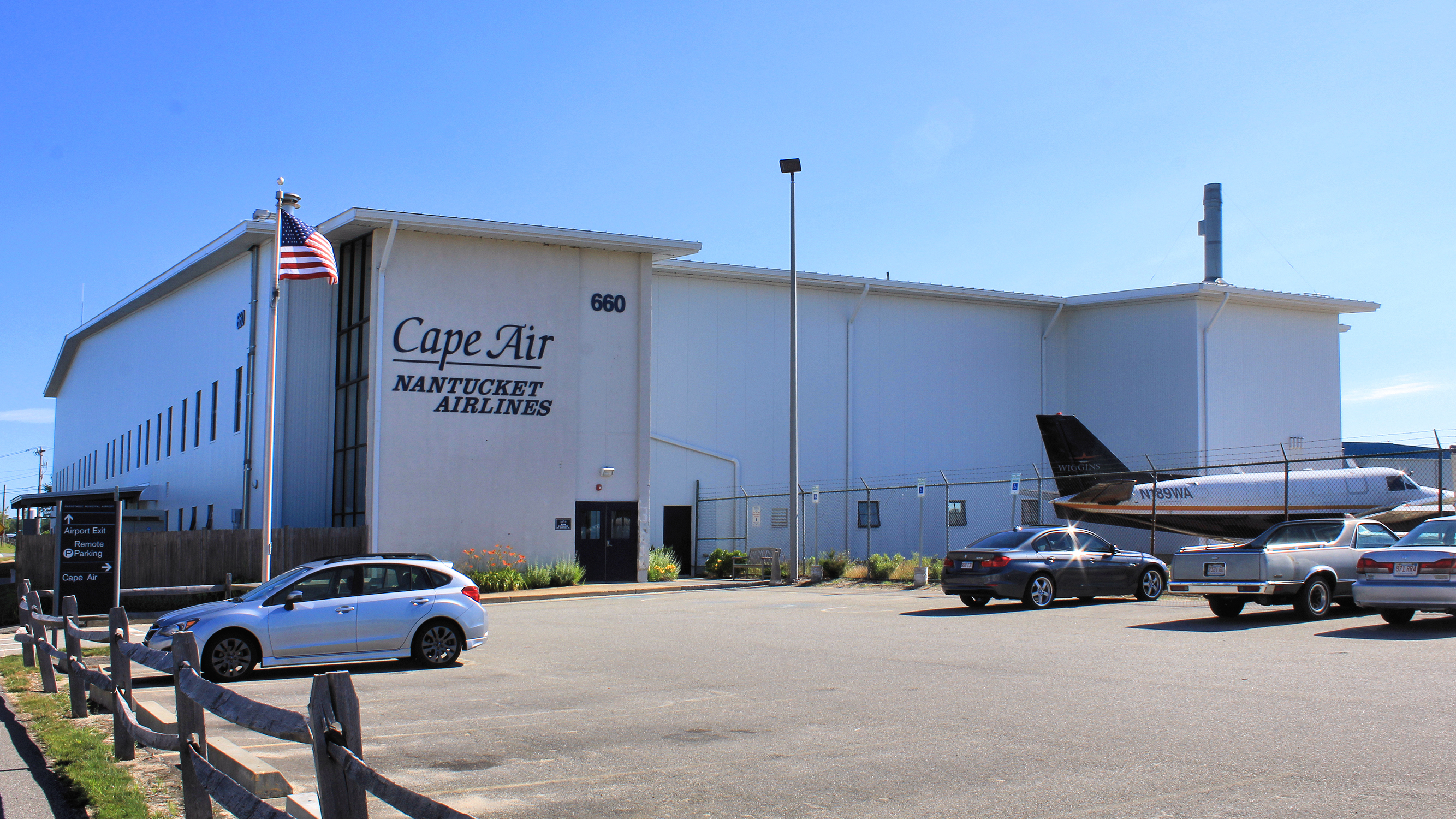
Cape Air headquarters

Cape Cod Gateway Airport (IATA: HYA, ICAO: KHYA, FAA LID: HYA), also known as Boardman/Polando Field and formerly known as Barnstable Municipal Airport, is a public airport located on Cape Cod, one mile (1.6 km) north of the central business district of Hyannis, in Barnstable County, Massachusetts, United States. This airport is publicly owned by the Town of Barnstable. It is Cape Cod's major airport as well as an air hub for the Cape and the Islands (Martha's Vineyard and Nantucket). The airport is served by scheduled commercial flights as well as charters and general aviation. Barnstable Municipal Airport served as a hub for Nantucket-based commuter airline Island Airlines until its shutdown in 2015.

The airport was founded in 1928. During World War II it was also known as Naval Auxiliary Air Facility Hyannis, and both the Navy and Army Air Forces flew antisubmarine patrols from the airport.

It was renamed Barnstable Municipal Airport–Boardman/Polando Field in honor of Massachusetts aviation pioneers Russell Boardman and John Polando in 1981, the first aviators in history to fly non-stop for a 5,000-mile (8,000 km) distance.

As of January 1, 2021, the airport has rebranded itself as the Cape Cod Gateway Airport to provide better name recognition to off-Cape users not familiar with the name Barnstable.

== Facilities ==
Barnstable Municipal Airport covers an area of 639 acres (2.59 km^{2}). The airport has two asphalt grooved runways: 6/24 is 5,425 x 150 ft (1,654 x 46 m) and 15/33 is 5,253 x 150 ft (1,601 x 46 m).

Currently there are Cessna 402 and Tecnam P2012 commuter aircraft operated by Cape Air in addition to Airbus A220-300 jets seasonally operated by JetBlue Airways and Republic Airlines Embraer E-175s operating for American Eagle which are seasonal as well.

Other commercial aircraft that have served KHYA in the past include Boeing 727, Boeing 737 and McDonnell Douglas DC-9 jets as well as ATR 42, Beechcraft 99, Beechcraft 1900C, Beechcraft 1900D, Convair 580, de Havilland Canada DHC-6 Twin Otter, de Havilland Canada DHC-8 Dash 8, Dornier 228, Embraer EMB-110 Bandeirante, Fairchild Hiller FH-227, NAMC YS-11, Saab 340 and Short 360 turboprops, and Britten-Norman Islander, Cessna, Douglas DC-3 and Piper Aircraft piston-powered airplanes.

The airport had scheduled passenger jet service as early as 1969 when Northeast Airlines was operating McDonnell Douglas DC-9-30 flights as well as operating service with Fairchild Hiller FH-227 turboprop aircraft with nonstop flights to New York Kennedy Airport (JFK), Boston (BOS) and Nantucket (ACK) plus direct, no change of plane flights to New York LaGuardia Airport. Northeast Airlines was then acquired by and merged into Delta Air Lines which subsequently ceased all service to the airport during the 1970s.

According to the Official Airline Guide (OAG), regional and small commuter airlines serving the airport with scheduled passenger flights from the mid-1970s to the mid-1990s included Air New England, Cape Air, Colgan Air (later Pinnacle Airlines and still later Endeavor Air), Continental Express (operated by Bar Harbor Airlines on behalf of Continental Airlines), the Delta Connection (operated by Business Express on behalf of Delta Air Lines), Eastern Express (operated by Bar Harbor Airlines on behalf of Eastern Airlines), Edgartown Air, Express Air, Gull Air, Hyannis Aviation, Island Air, Nantucket Airlines, New York Air Commuter Airlines, Northwest Airlink (operated by Precision Airlines on behalf of Northwest Airlines), Provincetown-Boston Airlines (PBA), USAir Express and Will's Air with all of these air carriers operating either turboprop or small piston powered aircraft.

In the summer months, the airport traffic increases significantly, commercially and privately, being the main airport for Cape Cod. The fixed-base operators at the airport are Rectrix Aviation, Cape Air, and Griffin Avionics.

== Airlines and destinations ==
Airlines	Destinations
American Eagle	Seasonal: Chicago–O'Hare, New York–LaGuardia, Philadelphia, Washington–National
Cape Air	Boston, Martha's Vineyard, Nantucket; Seasonal: New York–JFK
JetBlue	Seasonal: New York–JFK
Nantucket Airlines	Martha's Vineyard, Nantucket

Destinations map
All destinations from Cape Cod Gateway Airport

• Red represents year-round destinations.
• Green represents seasonal destinations.

• Blue represents future destinations.

== Statistics ==
For the 12-month period ending April 30, 2017, the airport averaged 262 operations per day: 60% air taxi, 31% transient general aviation, 9% local general aviation, <1% commercial, and <1% military. In August 2021, there were 37 aircraft based at this airport: 31 single-engine and 6 multi-engine.

=== Top destinations ===
Busiest domestic routes from HYA (September 2025 – August 2026)
Rank	City	Passengers	Carriers
1	New York–JFK, New York	8,030	Cape Air, JetBlue
2	Philadelphia, Pennsylvania	4,990	American Eagle
3	Nantucket, Massachusetts	4,880	Cape Air
4	Washington–National, D.C.	4,220	American Eagle
5	New York–LGA, New York	3,600	American Eagle
6	Boston, Massachusetts	3,400	Cape Air
7	Chicago–O'Hare, Illinois	520	American Eagle
8	Martha's Vineyard, Massachusetts	380	Cape Air

=== Airline market share ===
Largest airlines at HYA (September 2025 – August 2026)
Rank	Airline	Passengers	Share
1	Republic Airways (American Eagle)	27,410	45.13%
2	Nantucket Airlines (Cape Air)	17,800	29.30%
3	JetBlue	15,530	25.57%

== Ground transportation ==
The airport is accessible through MA Route 28 or from US 6 through MA Route 132. Barnstable Municipal Airport is also served by local taxi services as well as four major car rental agencies. The Cape Cod Regional Transit Authority provides public transportation to and from the airport as part of the "Villager"/ Route 132 line.

== Accidents and incidents ==
- Air New England Flight 248: On the evening of June 17, 1979, a de Havilland Canada DHC-6 Twin Otter crashed on an ILS approach. All of those on the plane survived with the exception of the pilot, who was killed instantly.
- Dassault Mystere Falcon 900B (unscheduled flight): On March 17, 2000, a Dassault Falcon 900 registered N814M, carrying four people skidded off the Barnstable Municipal Airport runway in icy weather while attempting to land, crashed through a fence, crossed Route 28 and stopped in the middle of the TJ Maxx Plaza, causing serious damage to several cars in the parking lot, as well as leaking fuel, which in turn caused the busy plaza to shut down for the night due to safety concerns.
- Colgan Air Flight 9446: On August 26, 2003 a Beech 1900D operated by Colgan Air for US Airways Express hit the water shortly after taking off from Barnstable Municipal Airport. Both pilots died.
- On June 18, 2008, a Wiggins Airways DHC-6 Twin Otter, a cargo flight, crashed after takeoff due to the pilot's failure to remove the flight control lock prior to takeoff. The sole occupant, the pilot, was killed.
- On May 7, 2026, a Bearhawk LSA-8X, registration N912Z, flipped while attempting to land on Runway 24. The pilot suffered minor injuries.

== See also ==
- List of airports in Massachusetts
