= John Polando =

John Polando (1901–1985) was an early American aviation pioneer who, along with Russell Boardman, flew from Floyd Bennett Field to Istanbul in 1931 to set an aviation record for the longest continuous distance flown without refueling. Following this achievement, he was an officer in World War II.

== Biography ==
=== Early life ===
Born in 1901 in Lynn, Massachusetts, Polando learned to fly in 1918. After joining the United States Army Air Corps in 1927, he met Russell Boardman at a "Wall of Death" motorcycle event in Revere. Deciding that Boardman would make a good co-pilot, the two teamed up and began to pursue a dream of breaking a world record.

=== Record attempt ===
The two men trained at Hyannis Airport in preparation for their trip to Istanbul. While it was originally planned for them to fly to Teheran, and Rome and Moscow, were considered it was determined that Istanbul would be easier than Teheran as the distance was shorter, and that flying to Rome or Moscow were not far enough to beat the record..

The record breaking flight took place between July 28 and 30, 1931. Polando and Russell Boardman took off from Floyd Bennett Field in the aircraft Cape Cod.The plane was a Bellanca Special J6 monoplane. Eighteen minutes later, Clyde Edward Pangborn and Hugh Herndon Jr. took off from Floyd Bennett in an unsuccessful attempt to circumnavigate the world. Boardman and Polando then flew over Newfoundland and dropped the New York Times at lighthouses in the province. Along the way, they also flew over Ireland, Paris, and Munich. They also circled the Swiss Alps at night to avoid crashing into them.

The distance of 5,011.8 miles (8,065.7 km), over a total of forty nine hours and twenty minutes established a distance record, which was the first known non-stop flight whose distance surpassed either English (5,000 mi) or metric (8,000 km) mark.

=== Death and legacy ===
Polando died in 1985 as a result of injuries sustained in an aircraft accident. In 1981, on the 50th anniversary of their record flight, Barnstable Municipal Airport added Boardman-Polando Field to its name to recognize their accomplishment.
