= Bolton Airport =

- IATA: none; ICAO: none

Summary
- Operator: Private
- Location: Clinton, Massachusetts
- Built: Unknown
- In use: 1930-1951
- Occupants: Private
- Elevation AMSL: 382 ft / 116 m
- Coordinates: 42°26′14.94″N 71°39′0.78″W
- Interactive map of Bolton Airport

Bolton Airport was an airfield operational in the mid-20th century in Clinton, Massachusetts.
