= Acushnet Airport =

- IATA: none; ICAO: none

Summary
- Operator: Private
- Location: Acushnet, Massachusetts
- Built: Unknown
- In use: 1952-1959
- Occupants: Private
- Elevation AMSL: 71 ft / 22 m
- Coordinates: 41°40′28.63″N 70°53′31.02″W
- Interactive map of Acushnet Airport

Acushnet Airport was an airfield operational in the mid-20th century in Acushnet, Massachusetts.
