= Westboro Airport =

- IATA: none; ICAO: none

Summary
- Operator: Private
- Location: Westborough, Massachusetts
- Built: Unknown
- In use: Before 1934-1977
- Occupants: Public
- Elevation AMSL: 208 ft / 63 m
- Coordinates: 42°16′32.86″N 71°39′1.58″W
- Interactive map of Westboro Airport

Westboro Airport was an airfield operational in the mid-20th century in Westborough, Massachusetts.
