= Russell Boardman =

American aviator (1898–1933)

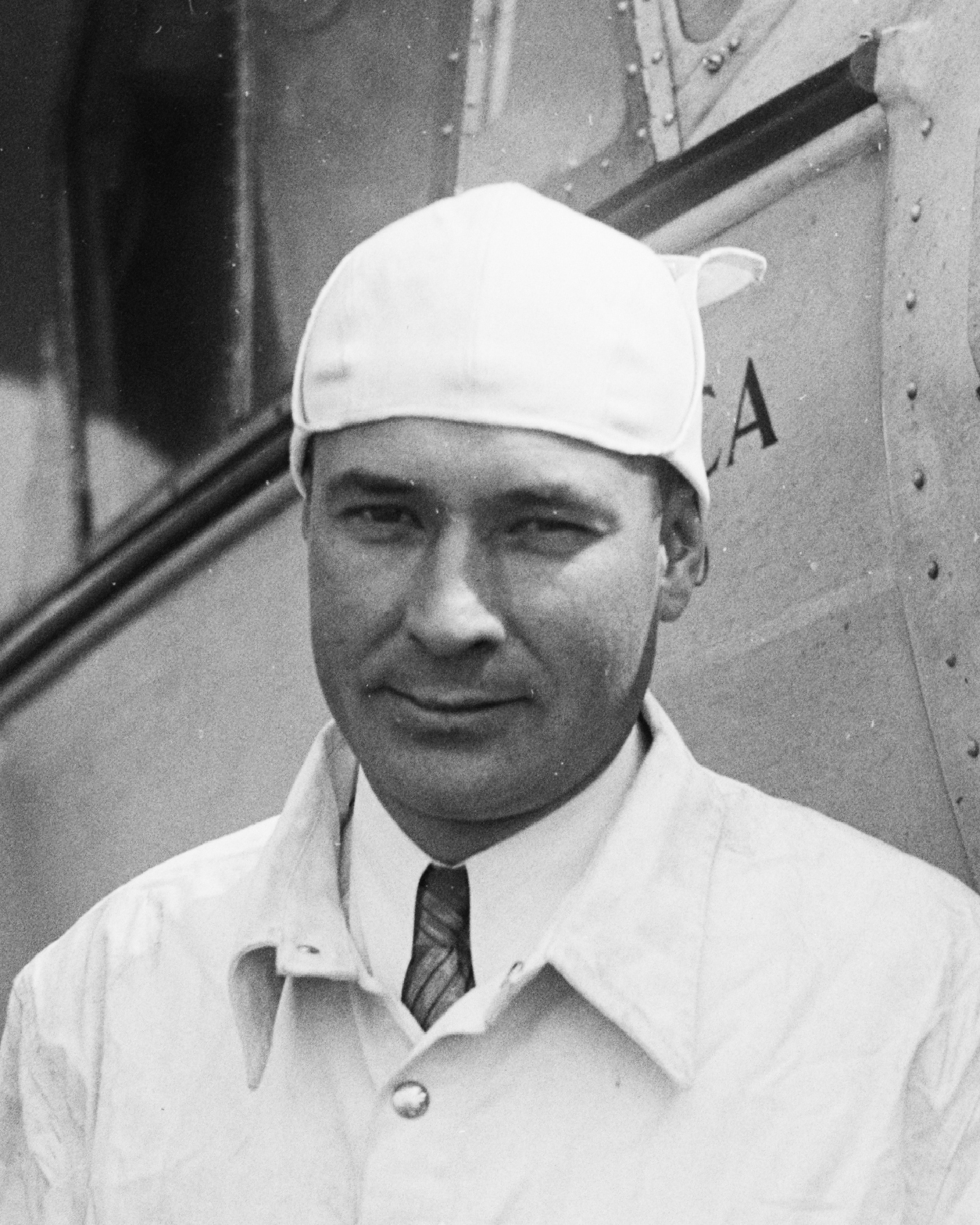
- Boardman in 1930
- Born: Russell Norton Boardman; January 21, 1898; Sharon, Connecticut, U.S.
- Died: June 1, 1933 (aged 35); Indianapolis, Indiana, U.S.
- Occupations: Aviator; stuntman
- Known for: First non-stop flight to exceed 5,000 miles
- Spouse: Ruth Boardman (died 1970)

Russell Boardman (January 21, 1898 – July 1, 1933) was an early American aviation pioneer who, along with John Polando, flew from Floyd Bennett Field to Istanbul, Turkey in 1931 to set an aviation record for the longest continuous distance flown without refueling. Before this achievement, he was also a stunt pilot for the film Hell's Angels.

== Early life ==
Russell Norton Boardman was born in 1898, on a farm in Connecticut belonging to his uncle Don Pedro Griswold (died 1910), an American Civil War veteran. His parents died in his early teens, leaving Russell and his elder brother Earl to support themselves and their sisters. They would make a living as motorcycle stunt performers.

== Aviation career ==
By the late 1920s, Russell Boardman had become an aviator. In 1928, he co-founded Cottonwood, Arizona's Rim Rock Ranch along with Virginia Finnie and country musician Romaine Lowdermilk. Using a Travel Air two-seater biplane, he would fly guests from Phoenix and Flagstaff back to the Ranch. In 1930, he flew as a stunt pilot for the Howard Hughes film Hell's Angels.

=== Record attempt with Polando ===
Boardman met John Polando at a "Wall of Death" motorcycle event in Revere, Massachusetts where Boardman was a rider. Polando decided that Boardman would make a good co-pilot due to his aviation maintenance skills, and the two teamed up and began to pursue a dream of breaking a world record.

The two men trained at Hyannis Airport in preparation for their trip to Istanbul.

The attempt at the record took place between July 28 and 30, 1931. Boardman and John Polando took off from Floyd Bennett Field in the aircraft Cape Cod. Eighteen minutes later, Clyde Edward Pangborn and Hugh Herndon, Jr. took off from Floyd Bennett in an unsuccessful attempt to circumnavigate the world. Boardman and Polando then flew over Newfoundland and dropped the New York Times at lighthouses in the province. Along the way, they also flew over Ireland, Paris, and Munich. They also circled the Swiss Alps at night to avoid crashing into them. While it was originally planned for them to fly to Moscow, it was determined that Istanbul would be easier, because it would allow for them to still break the record.

The distance of 5,011.8 miles (8,065.7 km), over a total of forty nine hours and twenty minutes helped to establish a distance record, which was the first known non-stop flight whose distance surpassed either English (5,000 mi) or metric (8,000 km) mark.

Following the landing of their aircraft in Istanbul, they were greeted with great fanfare. Both would be awarded the Distinguished Flying Cross for their achievement in 1933.

== Death ==
Boardman died on July 1, 1933, as a result of injuries sustained when his Gee Bee Model R crashed upon take-off following a fuel stop at Indianapolis. At the time of the crash, he was competing for the Bendix Trophy. His brother Earl flew his body back to Rentschler Field for his funeral in Connecticut.

== Legacy ==
Russell Boardman's widow, Ruth would sell the Cape Cod after her husband's death. After inheriting land in Yarmouth, Massachusetts that Russell had intended to be a flight school, she would rent out saltbox houses on the property.

In 1981, the airfield at Barnstable Municipal Airport was renamed Boardman/Polando Field to recognize their accomplishment.
