= Revere Airport =

- IATA: none; ICAO: none

Summary
- Airport type: Closed
- Location: Revere, Massachusetts
- In use: 1927–1962
- Coordinates: 42°25′40″N 071°00′47″W
- Interactive map of Revere Airport

Revere Airport was an American airport located in Revere, Massachusetts. It was in operation from 1927 to 1961.

Revere Airport opened in 1927 as Muller Field. It was run by the newly formed Old Colony Airways Corporation.

In 1930, Old Colony Airways and Muller Field were acquired by Beacon Air Service, a company owned by John and Walter O'Toole.

In 1937 the name was changed to Riverside Field, however it was still referred to in many publications as Muller Field. In 1939, Muller Field was in consideration to be the site of Massachusetts' first state airport. However, Jeffery Field in East Boston was chosen instead. Two years later, Muller Field, Hanscom Field, and Norwood Memorial Airport were considered for the site of the state's auxiliary airport. Hanscom Field was ultimately chosen to be the auxiliary airport.

During World War II, the airport was closed for security reasons. Although not used as an airport, the Ford plant in Somerville, Massachusetts used the marshes near the airport to test tanks and armored cars.

In 1946 Riverside Field was purchased by Julius Goldman who reopened it as Revere Airport. In 1947 the airport began seaplane operations and blimp landings. Also that year the famed Goodyear Blimp landed at Revere Airport.

The last remaining airport structure from Revere Airport was this repurposed hangar seen here in 2015.

During the late 1950s, the airport began to shrink from its original 156 acres. Construction of the Northeast Expressway forced the airport to abandon one of its runways and made landing difficult on the other two. Seven of the original eleven hangars were sold to make way for industrial centers. Revere's high tax rate and the private airport's ineligibility for federal funds made it "economically unsound" for owner Julius Goldman to continue operations. On April 23, 1962, Revere Airport closed. The fifty aircraft that were based at the airport were relocated to Beverly Municipal Airport in Beverly, Massachusetts. Goldman's Revere Airways Inc. also relocated to Beverly, where it became Revere Aviations. The property was redeveloped in to the Northgate Shopping Center. No buildings remain from the airport; the last was a hangar that became Sozio's furniture store on Squire Road, down the street from where the airport was located. This building was completely destroyed by fire on February 17, 2018.
