= Grafton Airport (Massachusetts) =

Airport in Massachusetts, United States of America

- IATA: none; ICAO: none

Summary
- Operator: Private
- Location: Grafton, Massachusetts
- Built: Unknown
- In use: 1927-Before 1954
- Occupants: Private/Public
- Elevation AMSL: 426 ft / 130 m
- Coordinates: 42°13′37.07″N 71°42′54.83″W
- Interactive map of Grafton Airport

Grafton Airport was a private airfield that was operational during the mid-20th century in Grafton, Massachusetts.
