= Cape TRACON =

Radar Station in Massachusetts, US

The Cape TRACON (K90) is a radar approach facility located at Joint Base Cape Cod, Massachusetts next to the airfield for Coast Guard Air Station Cape Cod. It is operated by the Federal Aviation Administration (FAA).

The primary responsibility of Cape Approach is the safe, orderly, and expeditious flow of arrival, departure, and inter-island traffic in and around the Cape and Islands area of Massachusetts, at and below 10,000 feet MSL.

K90 is responsible for providing arrival and departure, and radar services the following airports:

- Coast Guard Air Station Cape Cod (KFMH) - formally Otis ANGB
- Nantucket Memorial Airport (KACK)
- Martha's Vineyard Airport (KMVY)
- Hyannis Municipal Airport (KHYA)
- Plymouth Municipal Airport (KPYM)
- Chatham Municipal Airport (KCQX)
- Provincetown Municipal Airport (KPVC)
- Falmouth Airpark (5B6)
- Katama Airpark (1B2)
- Cape Cod Airport (2B1)
- Several other small airfields scattered across the area

Cape TRACON is open daily from 6:00 am until 10:00 pm (local). During the summer the facility is open until 11:00 pm. When the facility is not open, air traffic control services are provided by Boston ARTCC, Area D.

== Airspace ==
Cape TRACON is responsible for the airspace approximately 30-40 nautical miles from Hyannis airport at and below 10,000 feet. In the vicinity of the Plymouth Airport, K90 is responsible for the airspace at and below 7,000 feet. Boston ARTCC is responsible for the airspace above the TRACONs. K90 is bordered to the west by Providence Approach, to the north by Boston TRACON, and the rest by Boston ARTCC, Area D.

Cape Approach operates two radar and ARTS systems. Their ASR-8 system is located at the facility and the ASR-9 system is located on the field at Nantucket Airport. The ASR-9 system was added to improve the radar coverage of the Nantucket airspace. These two systems work independently of each other but sit side-by-side in the control room. When one system is out of service (for scheduled and non-scheduled maintenance), the other system can be used as a backup (with some limitations).

NOTE: In preparation for Cape TRACON's consolidation into Boston TRACON (scheduled cut-over date February 2018) currently only the ASR-8 system is being used to allow for single scope operation. This is allowing controllers to transfer to Boston TRACON early to start the training process early.

=== North side radar system ===
The ASR-8 Radar and ARTS systems have four sectors of airspace:

These sectors are combined and de-combined as traffic and staffing permit.

- OTIS ARRIVAL (O scope): This sector is responsible for traffic over the Cape Cod peninsula and Plymouth areas at and below 3,000 feet. Arrivals and departures from FMH, HYA, PYM, CQX, PVC, 5B6, and 1B2 airports.
- CAPE NORTH ARRIVAL (N scope): This sector is responsible for traffic over the Cape Cod peninsula and Plymouth areas at above 4,000 feet. It has sequence setting authority for ACK arrivals via the Marconi VOR (LFV).
- CAPE SOUTH ARRIVAL (S scope): Responsible for the separation of traffic in the vicinity of Martha's Vineyard island 050-100. This sector sequences IFR traffic into Nantucket Airport from the west and has sequence setting authority for Cape and Island departures westbound via Providence VOR.
- MARTHA'S VINEYARD ARRIVAL (Y scope): Responsible for Martha's Vineyard Airport arrivals and departures. This controller sequences and vectors IFR arrivals to the active runway and will radar identify, climb, and turn on course IFR departures from MVY. This sector also handles any IFR traffic into or out of the Katama Airpark.

=== South side radar system ===
The ASR-9 Radar and ARTS systems have two sectors of airspace:

These sectors are combined and de-combined as traffic and staffing permit.

- NANTUCKET ARRIVAL (D scope): Just as the name suggests, this sector sequences arriving IFR aircraft to the active runway at Nantucket Airport (ACK).
- NANTUCKET DEPARTURE (K scope): This sector is responsible for separating departing IFR traffic from ACK. This sector will also sequence IFR arrivals coming in from the opposite side of the airport from the final approach in use (example: traffic from the west when runway 24 in use) and hand them off to the Nantucket Arrival controller.

=== Other operational positions ===
Cape TRACON also operates two flight data positions:

- Flight Data 1 (FD1): Duties include reading IFR clearances to pilots on the ground at K90's satellite airports, obtaining release times for airport under Traffic Management Initiatives, obtaining IFR releases from radar controllers, relaying IFR cancellations to radar controller, disseminating Traffic Management messages/hazardous weather information, as well as other various duties.
- Flight Data 2 (FD2): Assists FD1 as needed (only staffed during high demand traffic).
