= Coonamessett Airport =

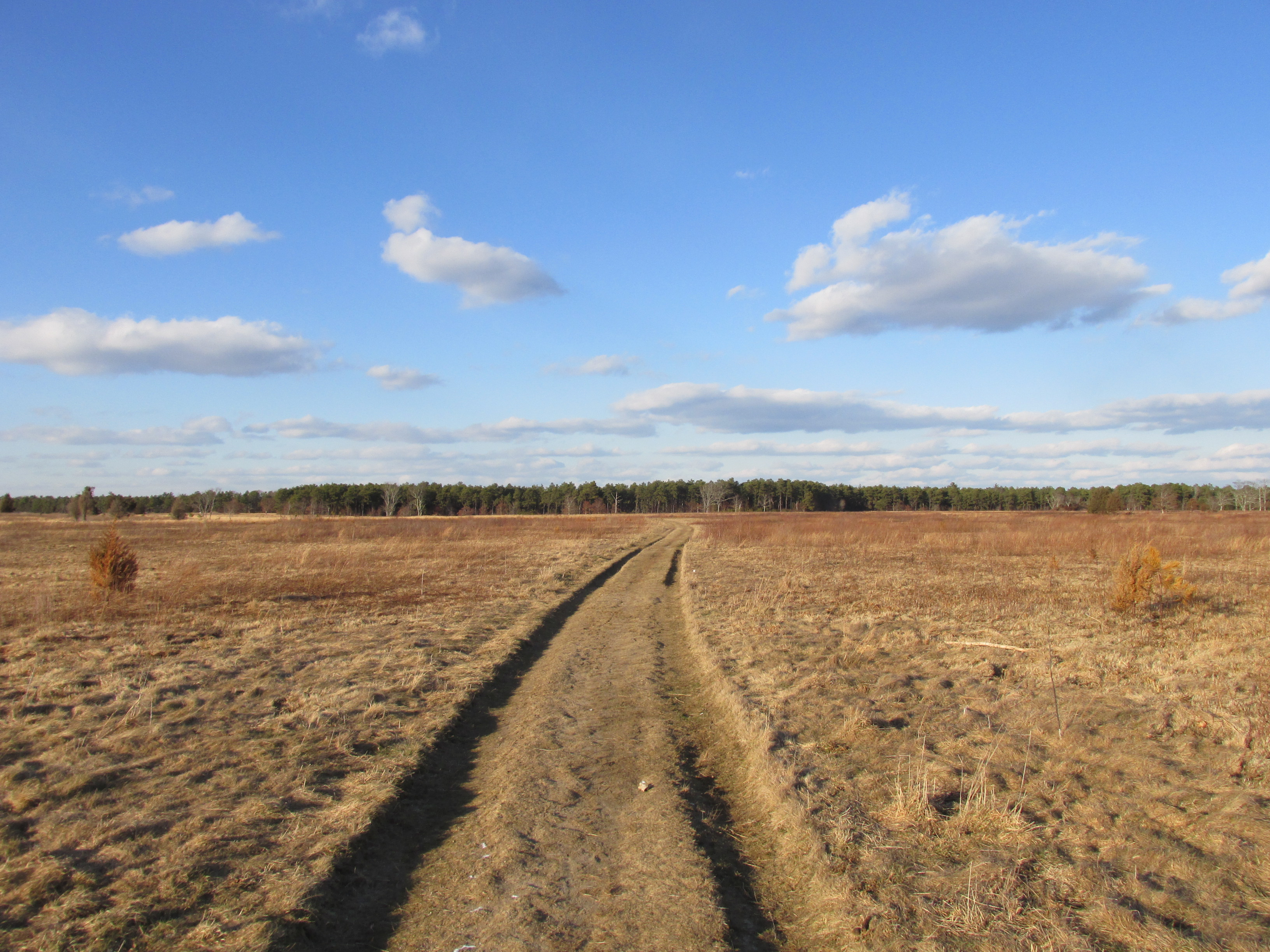
- Pheasant Area of the Frances A. Crane Wildlife Management Area
- IATA: none; ICAO: none

Summary
- Operator: Private
- Location: Hatchville, Massachusetts
- Built: Unknown
- In use: 1933-1968
- Occupants: Private
- Elevation AMSL: 98 ft / 30 m
- Coordinates: 41°38′16.34″N 70°33′35.45″W
- Interactive map of Coonamessett Airport

Coonamessett Airport was an airfield operational in the mid-20th century in Hatchville, Massachusetts, on Cape Cod. It is now part of the Pheasant Area at the Frances A. Crane Wildlife Management Area.
