= KCQX =

KCQX may refer to:

- Chatham Municipal Airport (ICAO code KCQX)
- KCQX-LP, a defunct low-power radio station (106.9 FM) formerly licensed to Cuchara, Colorado, United States
