= K-90 =

K-90 or K90 may refer to:

- K-90 (Kansas highway), a highway in Kansas
- K-90, a rating for hills indicating a construction point of 90
- INS Prachand (K90), a former Indian Navy ship
- K90 (DJ), British hard dance disc jockey
- Cape TRACON (FAA location identifier K90), a former air traffic control facility, now part of Boston Consolidated TRACON
