= Boston Consolidated TRACON =

Terminal control in Merrimack, New Hampshire

Coordinates: 42.8166°N 71.4935°W

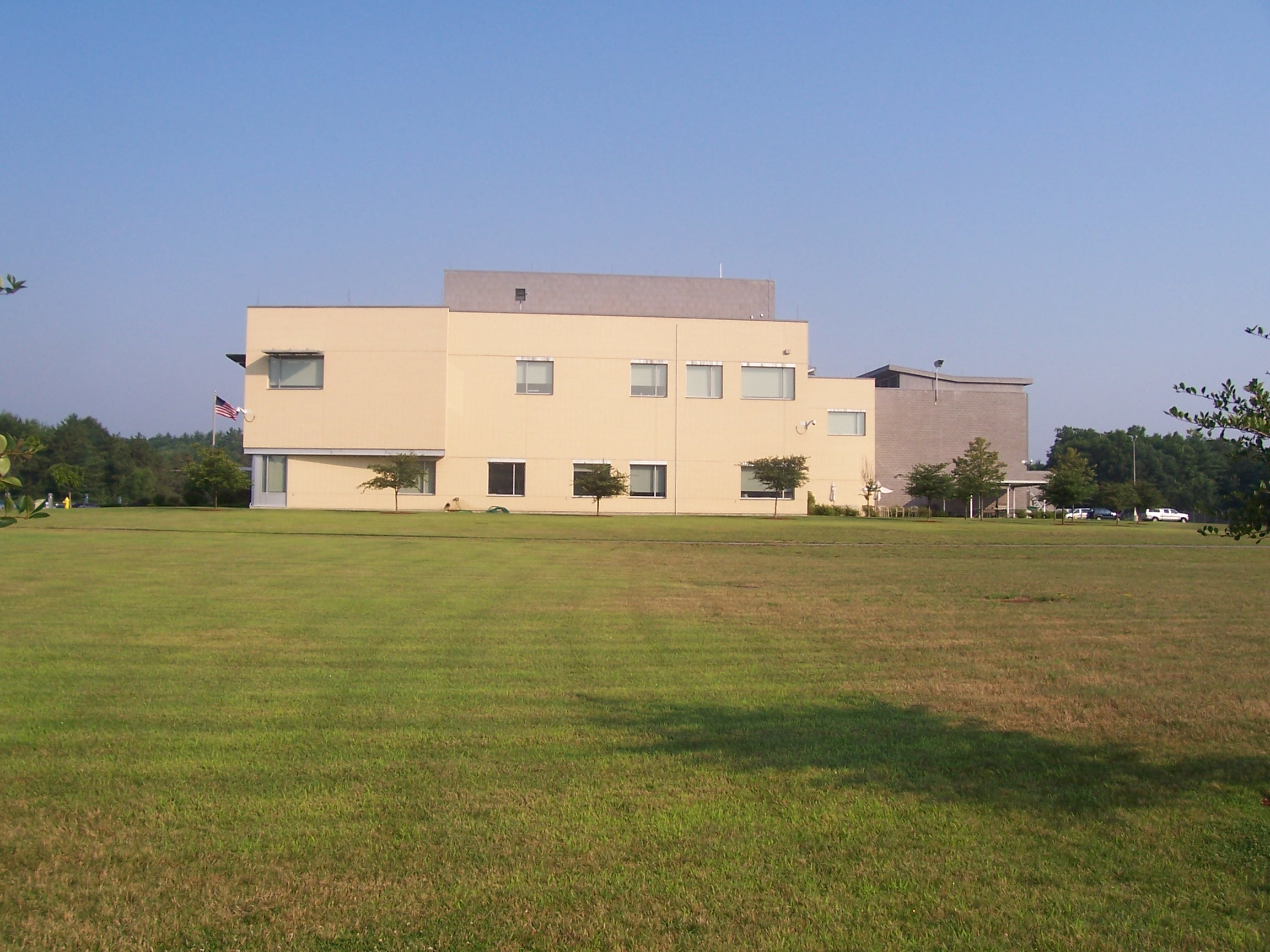
The Boston Consolidated TRACON

The Boston Consolidated TRACON (A90) (radio communications: Boston Approach and Boston Departure) is located in Merrimack, New Hampshire. Boston TRACON opened in 2004 after eight years of development. The TRACON functions from Logan International Airport transferred on February 22, 2004, and from Manchester Airport on March 7, 2004. Prior to the development of Boston TRACON, each airport had their own approach facilities through the control towers. The new facility is 63,000 square feet (5,900 m^{2}). A Terminal Radar Approach Control, or TRACON, is responsible for descending airplanes from the ARTCC and lining them up for landing at their destination airport, as well as climbing departures before handing off to the ARTCC. In 2024, Boston TRACON handled 810,615 aircraft movements, making it the 12th largest approach control facility in the United States.

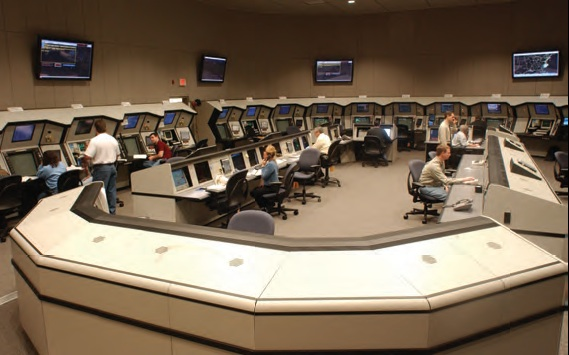
The Operations Room of the Boston Consolidated TRACON.

The primary responsibility of the Boston TRACON is the safe, orderly, and expeditious flow of arrival, departure, and en-route traffic. A90 is responsible for one large airport, Boston Logan International Airport and for dozens of smaller but busy fields, including Manchester-Boston Regional Airport, Hanscom Field, Norwood Memorial Airport, Beverly Municipal Airport, Lawrence Municipal Airport, Portsmouth International Airport at Pease, and Nashua Airport.

In February 2018 the Boston Consolidated TRACON absorbed the functions of the Cape TRACON located down at Otis Air National Guard Base on Cape Cod.

== Operations room ==
=== General ===
The Operations room is located on the second floor of the facility. Below the operations control room on the first floor is the electronics room where all of the computer and other electronic equipment is housed, with extra space for expansion or testing of new equipment. The Facility is backed up by two 1250 kW diesel generators and 4 UPS units (two 225kVA, two 40kVA).

Every workstation in the control room is equipped with the Systems Atlanta ACE-IDS IDS5 Software Suite.

BCT utilizes the Raytheon Standard Terminal Automation replacement system at all of its positions.

Also at each position is a computer touch screen which is the Enhanced Terminal Voice Switch (ETVS) built by the Northrop Grumman Corporation, this handles all of the ground to air and ground to ground communications.

=== Wall displays ===
A90 is equipped with multiple plasma flat-screen television screens which are used to display up to 16 different types of information needed by supervisory, traffic management and controllers-in-charge ranging from ETMS to Weather. Although they can be set to display almost anything, they will usually be set to one of three things. Commonly, a map of the Northeast United States will be displayed that shows all traffic landing or departing at Boston or Boston Satellite fields. This allows the controllers to look up at the screen and quickly tell if there is a rush about to come. Also commonly displayed is the IDS5 display. This information is also shown on a small touch-screen above each controller's station. Also, commonly displayed above the Initial Departure sector is a live video feed from Boston Tower showing the departure strip bay. This camera system is used to satisfy the requirement for "non-verbal rolling notification" as required by FAAO 7110.65. What is displayed on each screen can be changed at one of the center console positions, which is controlled with a computer touch screen.

== Training ==
BCT has a state-of-the-art simulator training facility located on the second floor just down from the operations control room. The room contains five training positions. The training room includes a Raytheon Standard Terminal Automation Replacement System (STARS). The STARS system has an embedded simulator ATCoach which is produced by UFA. Inc. out of Burlington, Massachusetts. This system provides the instructor and the student with a virtual display of live traffic on the STARS Terminal Controller workstation TCW. Raytheon provides the hardware and UFA provides the software and embedded simulator. Features of this simulator include: - Weather - Pre-programmed events - 600 aircraft profiles - Up to 24 simultaneous training exercises - Scenario development tools - Pseudo Pilot functions. This is one of the most advanced simulators in the National Airspace System. Accompanying ATCoach is ATVoice which provides the Voice Recognition and Response for the simulator. ATVoice allows the students to issue clearances directly to the simulated pilots during the exercise and then in turn ATVoice generates the proper pilot feedback/responses. Above each TDW is an exact replica of the IDS-5 information display. The facility also has State-of-the-art classrooms which are able to feature computer generated graphics and multimedia source material that comes right from the Operations room.

== Areas of Specialization ==
With the consolidation of Cape TRACON into the A90 in February 2018, a new division of airspace has emerged. The new configuration is known as "Boston-North" and "Boston-South" areas of specialization. Two sectors shared between both areas are Initial Departure ID and Lincoln SL.

Boston North Area - Airspace to the north of Boston Logan International Airport. These airports include BOS, BED, LWM, BVY, MHT, ASH, PSM, CON. Boston South Area - Airspace to the south of Boston Logan International Airport. These airports include OWD, PYM, FMH, HYA, MVY, ACK, CQX, PVC. A90 is bordered by the following facilities: Providence TRACON (G90), Bradley TRACON (Y90), Portland TRACON (PWM), Boston Air Route Traffic Control Center.
