= Falmouth Airpark =

- IATA: none; ICAO: none; FAA LID: 5B6

Summary
- Airport type: Public
- Owner: Falmouth Airpark Homeowners Assoc.
- Serves: Falmouth, Massachusetts
- Elevation AMSL: 43 ft (13 m)
- Coordinates: 41°35′08″N 070°32′25″W
- Website: www.falmouthairpark.net

Map
- Interactive map of Falmouth Airpark

Statistics (2007)
- Based aircraft: 52
- Source: Federal Aviation Administration

Falmouth Airpark (FAA LID: 5B6) is a public-use airport and residential airpark located four miles (6 km) northeast of the central business district of Falmouth, in Barnstable County, Massachusetts, United States. It is privately owned by Falmouth Airpark Homeowners Association. The airport grew to supersede the Coonamessett Airport which was located in close proximity to the Otis Air National Guard Base and closed in the 1960s.

== Facilities and aircraft ==
Falmouth Airpark covers an area of 110 acres (45 ha).

Runway Information
| Dimensions | 2298 x 40 ft. / 700 x 12m | |
| Surface | asphalt, in good condition. | |
| Weight Bearing Capacity | Single Wheel: 4.0 | |
| Runway Edge Lights | Low Intensity | |
| | Runway 7 | Runway 25 |
| Latitude | 41-35.016423N | 41-35.252345N |
| Longitude | 070-32.617743W | 070-32.223817W |
| Elevation(MSL) | 38.0 ft | 41.0 ft |
| Gradient | 0.2% | 0.2% |
| Traffic Pattern | Right | Left |
| Markings | Basic, in good condition | Basic, in good condition |
| Obstructions | 33 ft. trees, 300 ft. from runway, 60 ft. left of centerline. 3:1 slope to clear. | 25 ft. trees 300 ft. from runway, 125 ft. right of centerline. 4:1 slope to clear. |

Airport Services
| Fuel Available | 100LL, UL94 |
| Parking | hangars and tiedowns |

Airport Communications
| CTAF/UNICOM | 122.8 |
| CAPE APCH/DEP | 118.2 |

For a 12-month period ending April 21, 2016, the airport averaged 39 operations a week: 61% local general aviation, 37% transient general aviation, 1% military, and 1% air taxi. During that same time there were 55 aircraft based on the field: 50 single engine, and 5 multi-engine aircraft.

== See also ==
- List of airports in Massachusetts
