= Airport surveillance radar =

Radar system for the area near an airport

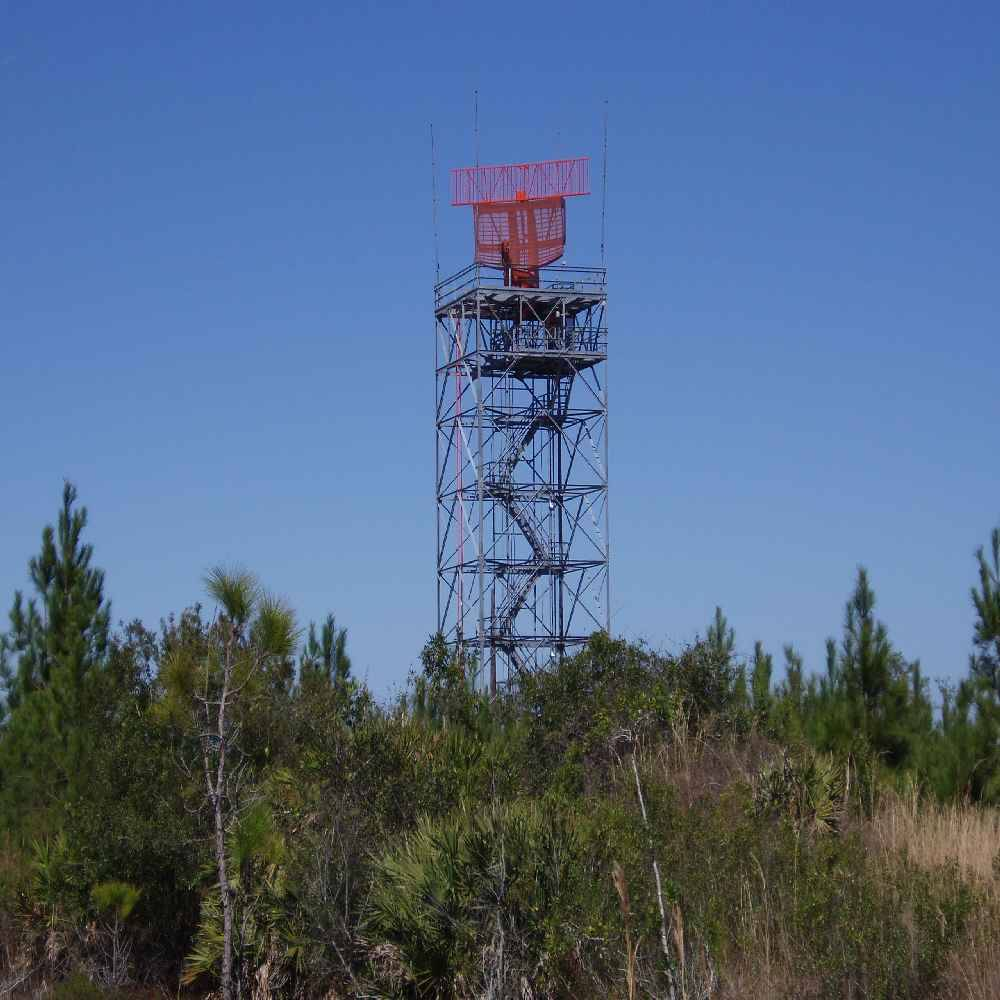
Daytona Beach International Airport Surveillance Radar.

An airport surveillance radar (ASR) is a radar system used at airports to detect and display the presence and position of aircraft in the terminal area, the airspace around airports. It is the main air traffic control system for the airspace around an airport. At large airports it typically controls traffic within a radius of 60 miles (96 km) of the airport below an elevation of 25,000 feet. The sophisticated systems at large airports consist of two different radar systems, the primary and secondary surveillance radar. The primary radar typically consists of a large rotating parabolic antenna dish that sweeps a vertical fan-shaped beam of microwaves around the airspace surrounding the airport. It detects the position and range of aircraft by microwaves reflected back to the antenna from the aircraft's surface. The secondary surveillance radar consists of a second rotating antenna, often mounted on the primary antenna, which interrogates the transponders of aircraft, which transmit a radio signal back containing the aircraft's identification, barometric altitude, and an emergency status code, which is displayed on the radar screen next to the return from the primary radar.

The positions of the aircraft are displayed on a screen; at large airports on multiple screens in an operations room at the airport called in the US the Terminal Radar Approach Control (TRACON), monitored by air traffic controllers who direct the traffic by communicating with the aircraft pilots by radio. They are responsible for maintaining a safe and orderly flow of traffic and adequate aircraft separation to prevent midair collisions.

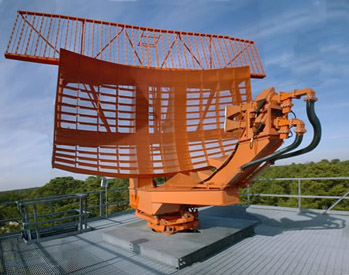
An ASR-9 airport surveillance radar antenna. The curving lower reflector is the primary radar, while the flat antenna on top is the secondary radar. Radio frequency energy enters and leaves the antenna via the two small orange horn feeds visible in the right foreground, and is guided to and from the radar processing circuitry through the black waveguides curving from the feeds into and down through the rotating central mount.

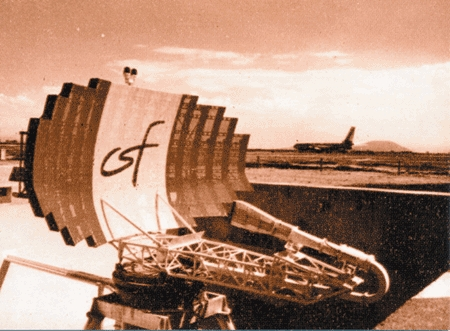
An early LP23 airport surveillance radar antenna at Orly airport, near Paris, France, in 1964

== Primary radar ==
Radar was developed during World War II as a military air defense system. The primary surveillance radar (PSR) consists of a large parabolic "dish" antenna mounted on a tower so it can scan the entire airspace unobstructed. It transmits pulses of microwave radio waves in a narrow vertical fan-shaped beam about a degree wide. In the US the primary radar operates at a frequency of 2.7 - 2.9 GHz in the S band with a peak radiated power of 25 kW and an average power of 2.1 kW. The dish is rotated at a constant rate about a vertical axis so the beam scans the entire surrounding airspace about every 5 seconds. When the microwave beam strikes an airborne object, the microwaves are reflected and some of the energy (sometimes called the "echo") returns to the dish and is detected by the radar receiver. Since the microwaves travel at a constant speed very close to the speed of light, by timing the brief interval between the transmitted pulse and the returning "echo" the radar can calculate the range from the antenna to the object. The location of the object is displayed as an icon on a map display called a "radar screen". The screen may be located in the control tower, or at large airports on multiple screens in an operations room at the airport called in the US the Terminal Radar Approach Control (TRACON). The primary radar's main function is to determine the location, the bearing and range to the aircraft. Air traffic controllers continuously monitor the positions of all the aircraft on the radar screen, and give directions to the pilots by radio to maintain a safe and orderly flow of air traffic in the airspace.

== Secondary radar ==
Video of radar screen at Nice Côte d'Azur Airport, Nice, France, showing aircraft preparing to land under the direction of the approach controller. The speed is increased to show the motion. Each aircraft is represented by an icon with a tail to show the direction of motion, with text beside it showing the aircraft's identifying flight number and altitude provided by secondary radar.

The need for a secondary radar system developed from the limitations of primary radar and need for more information by air traffic controllers due to the increasing postwar volume of air traffic. The primary radar displays a "return" indiscriminately from any object in its field of view, and cannot distinguish between aircraft, drones, weather balloons, birds, and some elevated features of the terrain (called "ground clutter"). Primary radar also cannot identify an aircraft; before secondary radar aircraft were identified by the controller asking the aircraft by radio to turn onto a specified heading. Another limitation is that primary radar cannot determine the altitude of the aircraft.

Secondary surveillance radar (SSR), also called the air traffic control radar beacon system (ATCRBS) had its origin in Identification Friend or Foe (IFF) systems used by military aircraft during World War II. All aircraft are required to carry an automated microwave transceiver called a transponder. The secondary radar is a rotating flat antenna, often mounted on top of the primary radar dish, which transmits a narrow vertical fan-shaped microwave beam on a frequency of 1030 MHz in the L band with peak power of 160 - 1500 W. When it is interrogated by this signal, the aircraft's transponder beacon transmits a coded identifying microwave signal at a frequency of 1090 MHz back to the secondary radar antenna. This coded signal includes a 4 digit number called the "transponder code" which identifies the aircraft, and the aircraft's pressure altitude from the pilot's altimeter. This information is displayed on the radar screen beside the aircraft's icon for use by the air traffic controller. The transponder code is assigned to the aircraft by the air traffic controller before takeoff. Controllers use the term "squawk" when they are assigning a transponder code, e.g., "Squawk 7421".

Transponders can respond with one of several different "modes" determined by the interrogation pulse from the radar. Various modes exist from Mode 1 to 5 for military use, to Mode A, B, C and D, and Mode S for civilian use. Only Mode C transponders report altitude. Busy airports usually require all aircraft entering their airspace to have a mode C transponder which can report altitude, due to their strict requirements for aircraft altitude spacing; this is called a "Mode C veil".

== Types ==
Due to its crucial safety purpose, extreme uptime requirements, and need to be compatible with all the different types of aircraft and avionics systems, the design of airport surveillance radar is strictly controlled by government agencies. In the US the Federal Aviation Administration (FAA) is responsible for developing airport surveillance radar. All ASRs have the common requirements of detecting aircraft out to a range of 60 miles and an elevation of 25,000 feet. Upgrades are released in "generations" after careful testing:

=== ASR-7 ===
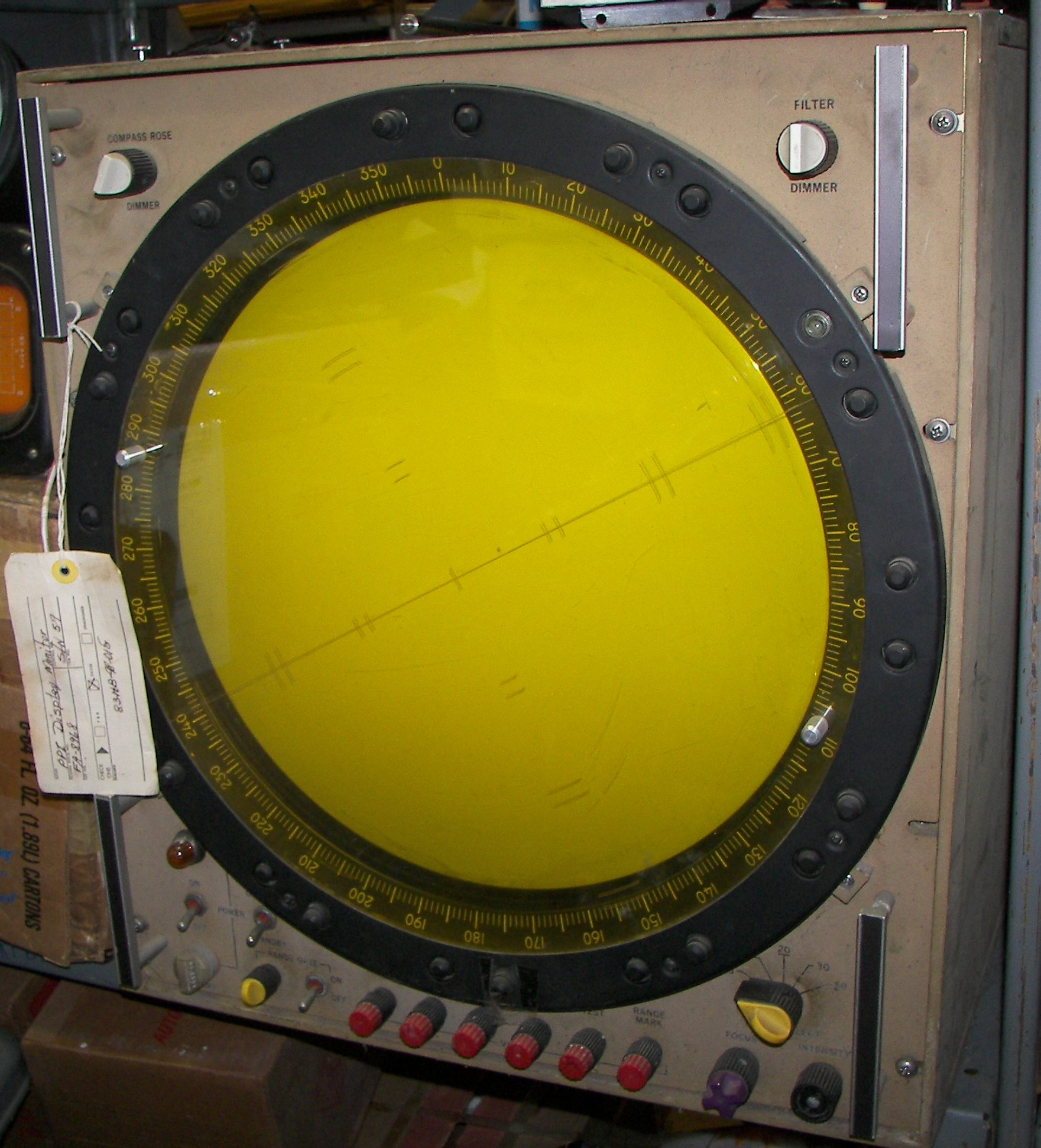
An ASR-7 Operator control panel and display as used in 1981. The unit uses a 15-inch P7 CRT having a non-rotating deflection yoke, vector monitor technology, and built-in electronics to provide drive signals for the familiar rotating PPI sweep.

This obsolete system, known to the US military as the AN/GPN-12, is completely out of service.

=== ASR-8 ===
ASR 8 is the analog precursor to the ASR 9. The military nomenclature for the radar is AN/GPN-20. It is an aging radar system that is obsolete, not logistically supported, does not provide digital inputs to new terminal automation systems, and does not provide a calibrated precipitation intensity product nor any storm motion information. It is a relocatable, solid-state, all-weather radar with dual-channel, frequency diversity, remote operator controls, and a dual beam tower mounted antenna. The radar provides controllers with range azimuth of aircraft within a 60 nautical mile radius. ASR 8 used a klystron as transmitters power amplifier stage with a load of 79 kV and 40A. The two operational frequencies have a minimum separation of 60 MHz.

The US Army/Navy designator AN/GPN-20 refers to a modified version of the ASR 8 used by the USAF containing a magnetron tube as transmitter. To improve the magnetron's frequency stability the magnetron tuning is driven by the AFC.

=== ASR-9 ===
The current generation of radar is the ASR-9, which was developed by Westinghouse Electric Corporation and first installed in 1989, with installation completing in 1995. The military nomenclature for the radar is AN/GPN-27. Currently it is operating at 135 locations and is scheduled to continue in use until at least 2025. The ASR-9 was the first airport surveillance radar to detect weather and aircraft with the same beam and be able to display them on the same screen. It has a digital Moving Target Detection (MTD) processor which uses doppler radar and a clutter map giving advanced ability to eliminate ground and weather clutter and track targets. It is theoretically capable of tracking a maximum of 700 aircraft simultaneously.

The klystron tube transmitter operates in the S-band between 2.5 and 2.9 GHz in circular polarization with a peak power of 1.3 MW and a pulse duration of 1 μs and pulse repetition frequency between 325 and 1200 pps. It can be switched to a second reserve frequency if interference is encountered on the primary frequency. The receiver has the sensitivity to detect a radar cross-section of 1 meter^{2} at 111 km, and a range resolution of 450 feet. The antenna covers an elevation of 40° from the horizon with two feedhorns which create two stacked overlapping vertical lobes 4° apart; the lower beam transmits the outgoing pulse and is used to detect distant targets near the horizon, while the upper receive-only beam detects closer higher elevation aircraft with less ground clutter. The antenna has a gain of 34 dB, beamwidth of 5° in elevation and 1.4° in azimuth. It rotates at a rate of 12.5 RPM so the airspace is scanned every 4.8 seconds.

The electronics is dual-channel and fault tolerant. It has a remote monitoring and maintenance subsystem; if a fault occurs a built-in test detects and isolates the problem. Like all airport surveillance radars it has a backup diesel generator to continue operating during power outages.

=== ASR-11 or Digital Airport Surveillance Radar (DASR) ===
The Digital Airport Surveillance Radar (DASR) is the new generation of fully digital radar that is being developed to replace the current analog systems. The US Air Force Electronics Systems Center, the US Federal Aviation Administration, US Army and the US Navy procured DASR systems to upgrade existing radar facilities for US Department of Defense (DoD) and civilian airfields. The DASR system detects aircraft position and weather conditions in the vicinity of civilian and military airfields. The civilian nomenclature for this radar is ASR-11. The ASR-11 will replace most ASR-7 and some ASR-8. The military nomenclature for the radar is AN/GPN-30. The older radars, some up to 20 years old, are being replaced to improve reliability, provide additional weather data, reduce maintenance cost, improve performance, and provide digital data to new digital automation systems for presentation on air traffic control displays. The Iraqi Air Force has received the DASR system.

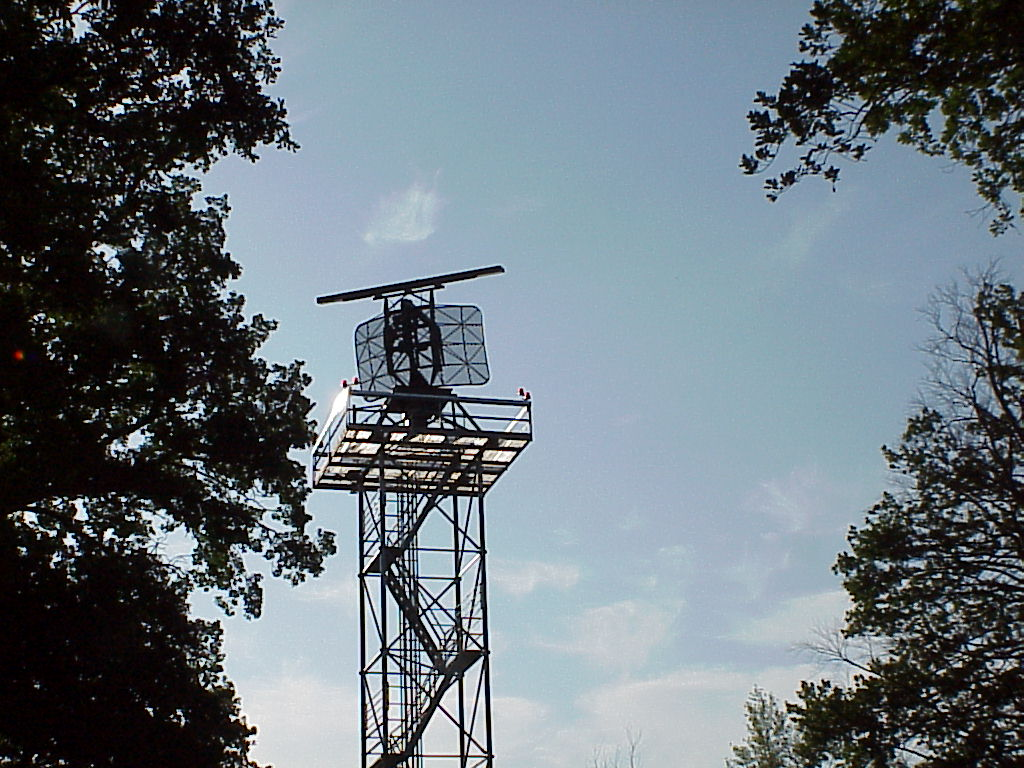
ASR 910, a German derivate of AN/TPN-24, Radartower in Neubrandenburg (Western-Pomerania/ Germany)

== Display systems ==
ASR data is displayed on Standard Terminal Automation Replacement System (STARS) display consoles in control towers and Terminal Radar Approach Control (TRACON) rooms, usually located at airports.

The Standard Terminal Automation Replacement System (STARS) is a joint Federal Aviation Administration (FAA) and Department of Defense (DoD) program that has replaced Automated Radar Terminal Systems (ARTS) and other capacity-constrained, older technology systems at 172 FAA and up to 199 DoD terminal radar approach control facilities and associated towers.

STARS is used by controllers, at all terminal radar facilities in the US to provide air traffic control (ATC) services to aircraft in the terminal areas. Typical terminal area ATC services are defined as the area around airports where departing and arriving traffic are served. Functions include aircraft separation, weather advisories, and lower level control of air traffic. The system is designed to accommodate air traffic growth and the introduction of new automation functions which will improve the safety and efficiency of the US National Airspace System (NAS).

Airport Surveillance Radar is beginning to be supplemented by ADS-B Automatic dependent surveillance-broadcast in the US and other parts of the world. As of Spring 2011, ADS-B is currently operational at most ATC facilities in the US. ADS-B is a GPS based technology that allows aircraft to transmit their GPS determined position to display systems as often as once per second, as opposed to once every 5–6 seconds for a short range radar, or once every 12–13 seconds for a slower rotating long range radar. The FAA is mandating that ADS-B be fully operational and available to the NAS by the year 2020. This will make possible the decommissioning of older radars in order to increase safety and cut costs. As of 2011, there is no definitive list of radars that will be decommissioned as a result of ADS-B implementation.

== See also ==
- Acronyms and abbreviations in avionics
- Air traffic control radar beacon system
- Air traffic control § Radar coverage

=== Lists ===
- List of radars
- List of military electronics of the United States
