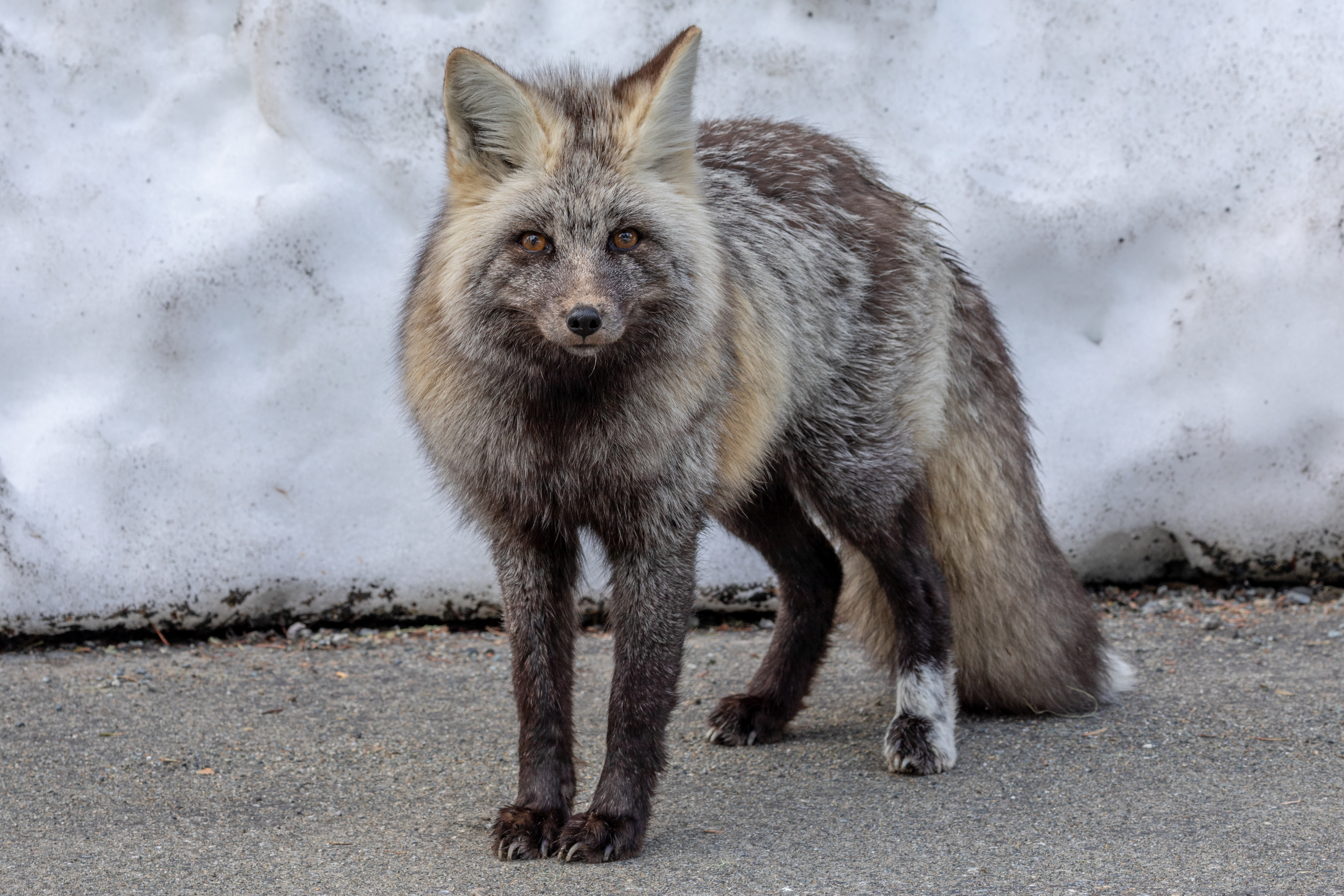
- Cross morph Cascade red fox in Paradise, Washington

Conservation status
- Critically Imperiled (NatureServe)

Scientific classification
- Kingdom: Animalia
- Phylum: Chordata
- Class: Mammalia
- Order: Carnivora
- Family: Canidae
- Genus: Vulpes
- Species: V. vulpes
- Subspecies: V. v. cascadensis

Trinomial name
- Vulpes vulpes cascadensis Merriam, 1900

= Cascade red fox =

Subspecies of red fox

The Cascade red fox (Vulpes vulpes cascadensis) is an endangered subspecies of red fox endemic to the state of Washington in the United States.

== Origins ==
The ancestors of the Cascade red fox colonized North America after crossing the Bering landbridge during the Illinoian glaciation over 300,000 years ago. During the Wisconsin glaciation, they were pushed south to escape to ice free forests. From that point, they adapted to the colder climate and became distinct. After the glaciation, they moved up into the mountains where conditions were similar.

== Diet ==
They prey on small mammals and birds living only in the mountains. Due to this, they have an ecology distinct from lowland red foxes.

== Distribution and habitat ==
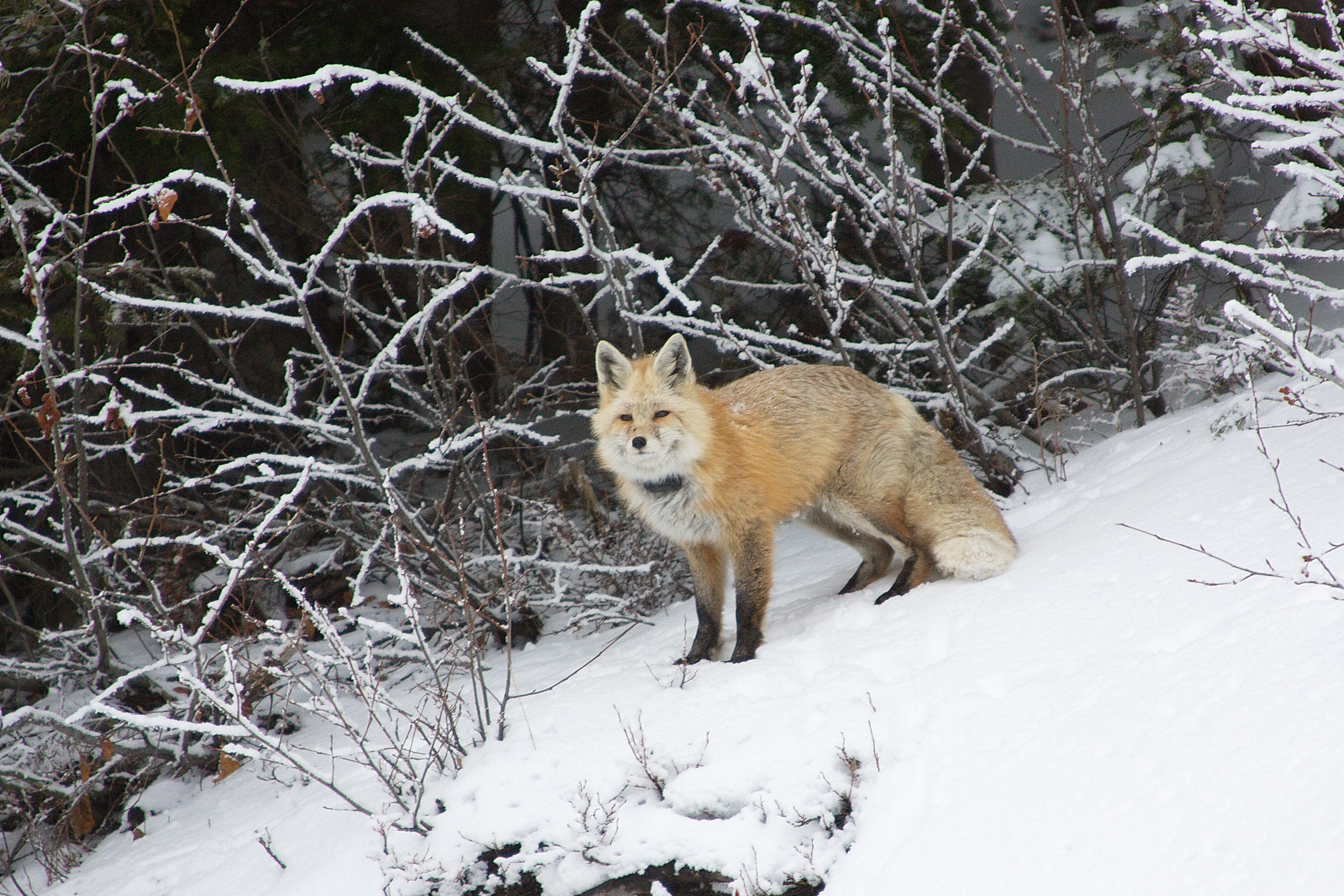
Cascade red fox in Mount Rainier National Park wearing a radio collar

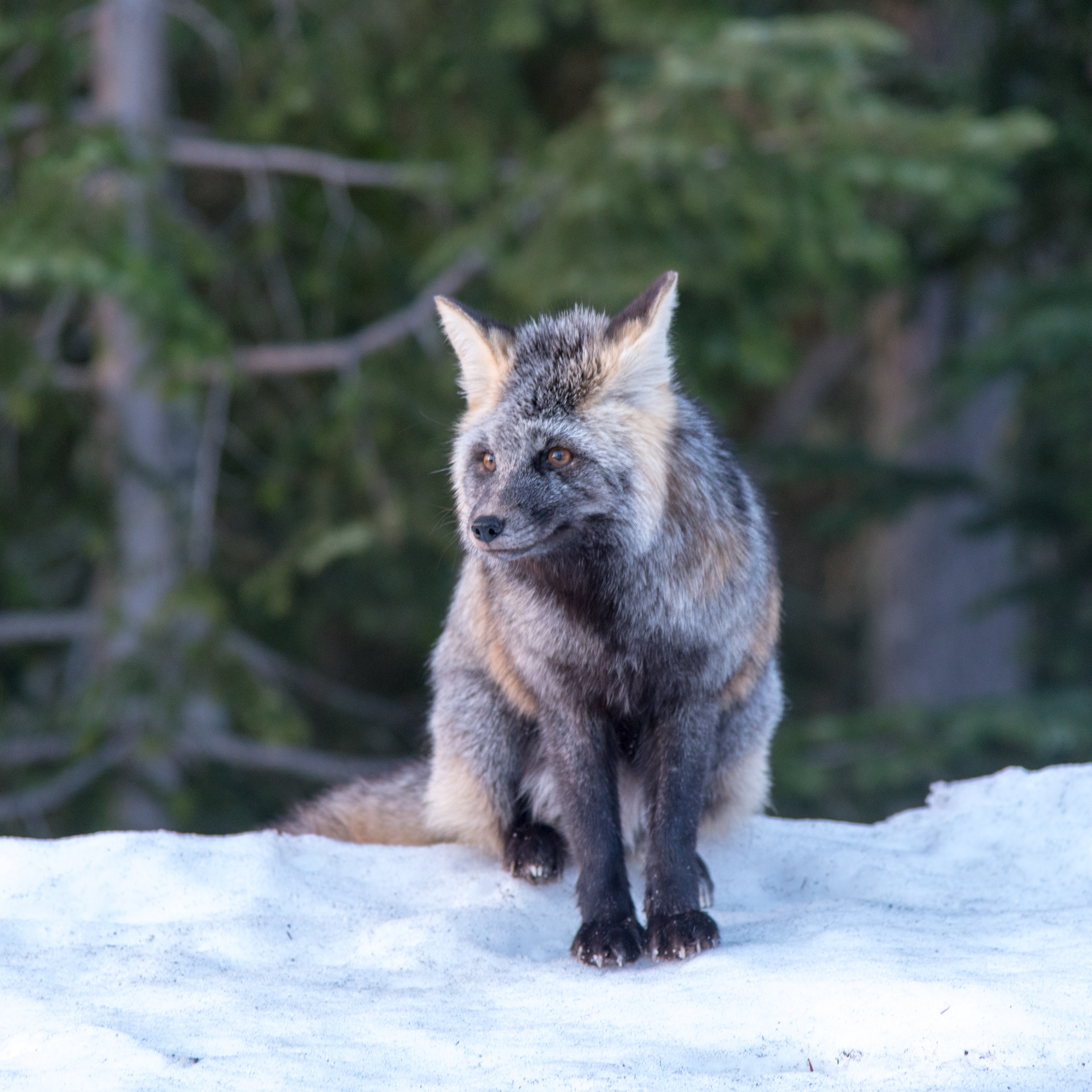
Cross morph Cascade red fox at Mt Rainier National Park in December

The range of the Cascade red fox is estimated to be 4,500 square kilometres (1,700 sq mi) but may be as large as 40,000 square kilometres (15,000 sq mi). They live in the subalpine meadows and parklands of the Cascade Mountains, as well as the open forests on the eastern slope. They do not however inhabit the densely forested western slope. They may inhabit the very southern parts of British Columbia. Recent surveys have suggested that they are becoming rarer. This might be due to habitat loss from climate change, logging, and increased recreation in winter allowing other predators such as coyotes and lowland red foxes to enter their habitat. Some populations might have gone extinct. The current number of individuals seems to be around 50.

== Conservation ==
The Cascade red fox is a Natural Heritage Critically Imperiled Species, as well as a Washington Endangered Species. Lack of information has made conservation efforts much harder.

== See also ==
- Sierra Nevada red fox
- American red fox
