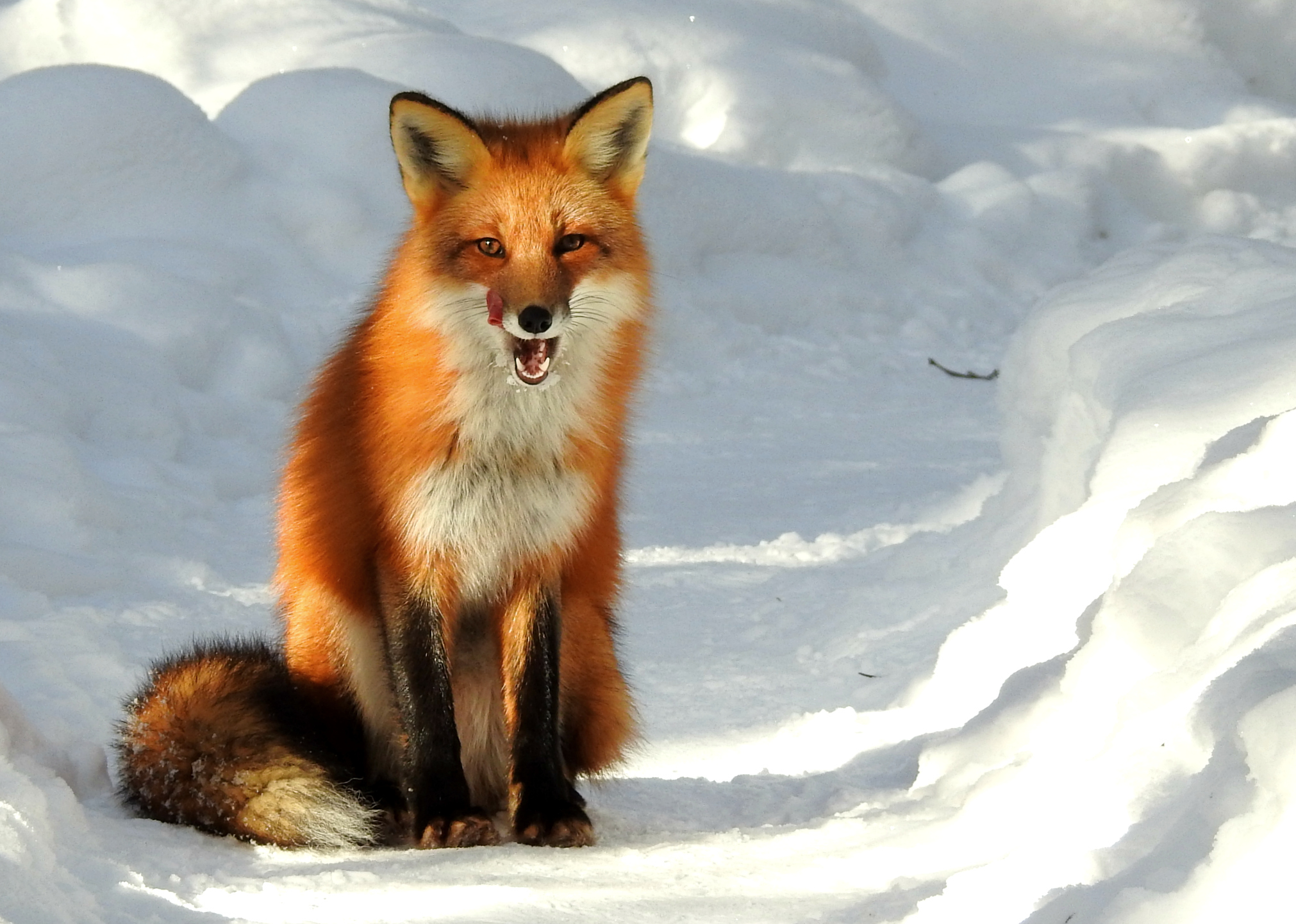

Conservation status
- Secure (NatureServe)

Scientific classification
- Kingdom: Animalia
- Phylum: Chordata
- Class: Mammalia
- Order: Carnivora
- Family: Canidae
- Genus: Vulpes
- Species: V. vulpes
- Subspecies: V. v. fulva

Trinomial name
- Vulpes vulpes fulva Desmarest, 1820

Synonyms
- V. v. pennsylvanicus Rhoads, 1894; Vulpes fulva; Vulpes fulva fulva; Vulpes vulpes fulvus

= American red fox =

American red fox Temporal range: 0.4–0 Ma Middle Pleistocene – present

Subspecies of carnivore

The eastern American red fox (Vulpes vulpes fulva) is a North American subspecies of the red fox. It is the largest of the true foxes and one of the most widely distributed members of the order Carnivora, occurring in North America. This subspecies is most likely the ancestor of the domesticated silver fox (Vulpes vulpes forma amicus).

== North American colonization and native status ==
There has been debate about the origins of the North American red fox, with some research published in 2002 suggesting that nearly all red fox populations in North America are not native. Vulpes vulpes is usually seen either as an exotic species introduced by Europeans during the colonization of the North American continent or as a hybrid between European and North American red foxes. While it is claimed that V. v. fulva stems from a non-native population that spread westward from European introduction, a historical analysis of firsthand accounts does not support this claim. Furthermore, North American red foxes are genetically distinct from their Eurasian counterparts. Despite claims of historical translocations from Europe, modern red fox populations in the United States' southeastern region have been shown to be native to North America.

Phylogeographical and genetic analysis of the North American red fox suggests red foxes first migrated to North America during the Illinoian glaciation (300,000 to 130,000 years Before Present (BP)), and spread southward. More recently, the Wisconsin glaciation (100,000 to 10,000 years BP), separated the North American red fox population into two distinct areas. DNA comparisons show that the eastern American red fox is closely related to native populations in Canada and the northeastern region of the United States and is, therefore, the result of natural range expansions and not an invasive species from Europe as was previously thought. Range expansions seen recently may be connected to anthropogenic landscape change and not the spread of exotic European populations.

The native status of the North American red fox has been demonstrated, which has important implications for management strategies. Previous classifications and taxonomic uncertainties frame populations of Vulpes fulva as a non-native invasive species that can cause declines in the populations of native species and in carrying capacities and can populate regions at higher densities. The identification of the origins of the North American red fox populations is crucial in conservation efforts aimed at native vs. non-native species.

== Taxonomy ==
The North American red foxes have been traditionally considered either as subspecies of the Old World red fox or as subspecies of their own species, V. fulva. Due to the opinion that North American red foxes were introduced from Europe, all North American red foxes have been seen as conspecific with V. vulpes; however, genetic analyses of global red fox haplotypes indicates that the North American red foxes have been genetically isolated from the Old World red foxes for 400,000 years, prompting possible application of V. fulva to all North American red foxes. Castello (2018) has formalized treatment of V. fulva as a separate species from the Old World species V. vulpes. In 2014, Mark J. Statham among others released a study that supports V. fulva as a separate species from the Old World species V. vulpes. However, the American Society of Mammalogists considers V. vulpes to be the only species, as splitting it into Old World and New World species would render the Old World species V. vulpes paraphyletic.

== Origin ==
Red foxes colonized the North American continent in two waves: before or during the Illinoian glaciation and during the Wisconsin glaciation. Gene mapping demonstrates that red foxes in North America have been isolated from their Old World counterparts for over 400,000 years, thus raising the possibility that speciation has occurred. In the Far North, red fox fossils have been found in Sangamonian Stage deposits near the Fairbanks District, Alaska and Medicine Hat, Alberta. Fossils dating from the Wisconsin are present in 25 sites in Arkansas, California, Colorado, Idaho, Missouri, New Mexico, Ohio, Tennessee, Texas, Virginia and Wyoming. Although they ranged far south during the Wisconsin , the onset of warm conditions shrank their range toward the north and they have only recently reclaimed their former American ranges because of human-induced environmental changes. Genetic testing indicates two distinct red fox refugia exist in North America, which have been separated since the Wisconsin. The northern (or boreal) refugium occurs in Alaska and western Canada and consists of the large subspecies V. f. abietorum, V. f. alascensis, V. f. regalis and V. f. rubricosa. The southern (or montane) refugium occurs in the alpine meadows and the subalpine parklands of the Rocky Mountains, the Cascade Range and the Sierra Nevada and consists of the small subspecies V. f. cascadensis, V. f. macroura, V. f. necator and V. f. patwin. The latter clade has been separated from all other red fox populations since the Last Glacial Maximum (LGM) and may possess unique ecological or physiological adaptations.

Although European foxes (V. v. crucigera) were reported to have been introduced to portions of the United States in the 1900s, recent genetic investigation indicates an absence of European fox haplotypes in any North American populations. Also, introduced eastern American red foxes have colonized southern California, the San Joaquin Valley and the San Francisco Bay Area, but appear to have mixed with the Sacramento Valley red fox (V. v. patwin) only in a narrow hybrid zone. In addition, no evidence has been seen of interbreeding of eastern American red foxes in California with the montane Sierra Nevada red fox (V. v. necator) or other populations in the Intermountain West (the area between the Rocky Mountains to the east and both the Cascade Range and the Sierra Nevada to the west).

== Subspecies ==
Usually named as subspecies of V. vulpes, Castelló recognized nine valid subspecies of V. fulva, as listed below:

Subspecies	Trinomial authority	Description	Range	Synonyms
British Columbian red fox Vulpes fulva abietorum	Merriam, 1900	Generally similar to V. f. alascensis, but with a lighter, longer and more slender skull.	The interior of British Columbia and probably southeastern Alaska, U.S.	sitkaensis (Brass, 1911)
Northern Alaska fox Vulpes fulva alascensis	Merriam, 1900	A large, long-tailed, small-eared subspecies with golden-fulvous fur.	The Andreafsky Wilderness, Alaska, U.S.	harrimani Merriam, 1900 kenaiensis Merriam, 1900
Cascade red fox Vulpes fulva cascadensis	Merriam, 1900	A short-tailed, small-toothed subspecies with yellow rather than fulvous fur; it is the subspecies most likely to produce cross color morphs.	The Cascade Range, Skamania County, Washington, U.S.	
Eastern American red fox Vulpes fulva fulva	Desmarest, 1820	A small subspecies, with a smaller, sharper face, a shorter tail, a lighter pelt more profusely mixed with whitish and darker limbs.	Eastern Canada and the eastern U.S.	pennsylvanicus (Rhoads, 1894)
Wasatch Mountains fox Vulpes fulva macroura	Baird, 1852	Similar to V. f. fulva, but with a much longer tail, larger hind feet, and more extensive blackening of the limbs.	Named for the Wasatch Mountains near the Great Salt Lake, Utah; found in the Rocky Mountains from Colorado and Utah, western Wyoming and Montana through Idaho north to southern Alberta	
Sierra Nevada red fox or High Sierra fox Vulpes fulva necator	Merriam, 1900	Similar in appearance to V. f. fulva, but with a short tail. Cranially, it resembles V. f. macroura more than it does V. f. fulva. There is not much black on the legs.	The High Sierra, California	
Sacramento Valley red fox Vulpes fulva patwin	Sacks et al, 2010	Similar in appearance to V. f. fulva, but with a short tail. Cranially, it resembles V. f. macroura more than it does V. f. fulva.	The Sacramento Valley, California	
Northern plains fox Vulpes fulva regalis	Merriam, 1900	The largest North American red fox subspecies; it has very large and broad ears and a very long tail. It is a golden-yellow color with pure black feet.	The Elk River, Sherburne County, Minnesota, U.S.	
Nova Scotia fox Vulpes fulva rubricosa	Bangs, 1898	A large subspecies with a large, broad tail and larger teeth and rostrum than V. f. fulva; it is also the deepest-colored subspecies.	Digby County, Nova Scotia, Canada	bangsi (Merriam, 1900) deletrix (Bangs, 1898) rubricos (Churcher, 1960) vafra (Bangs, 1897)

== Habitat ==
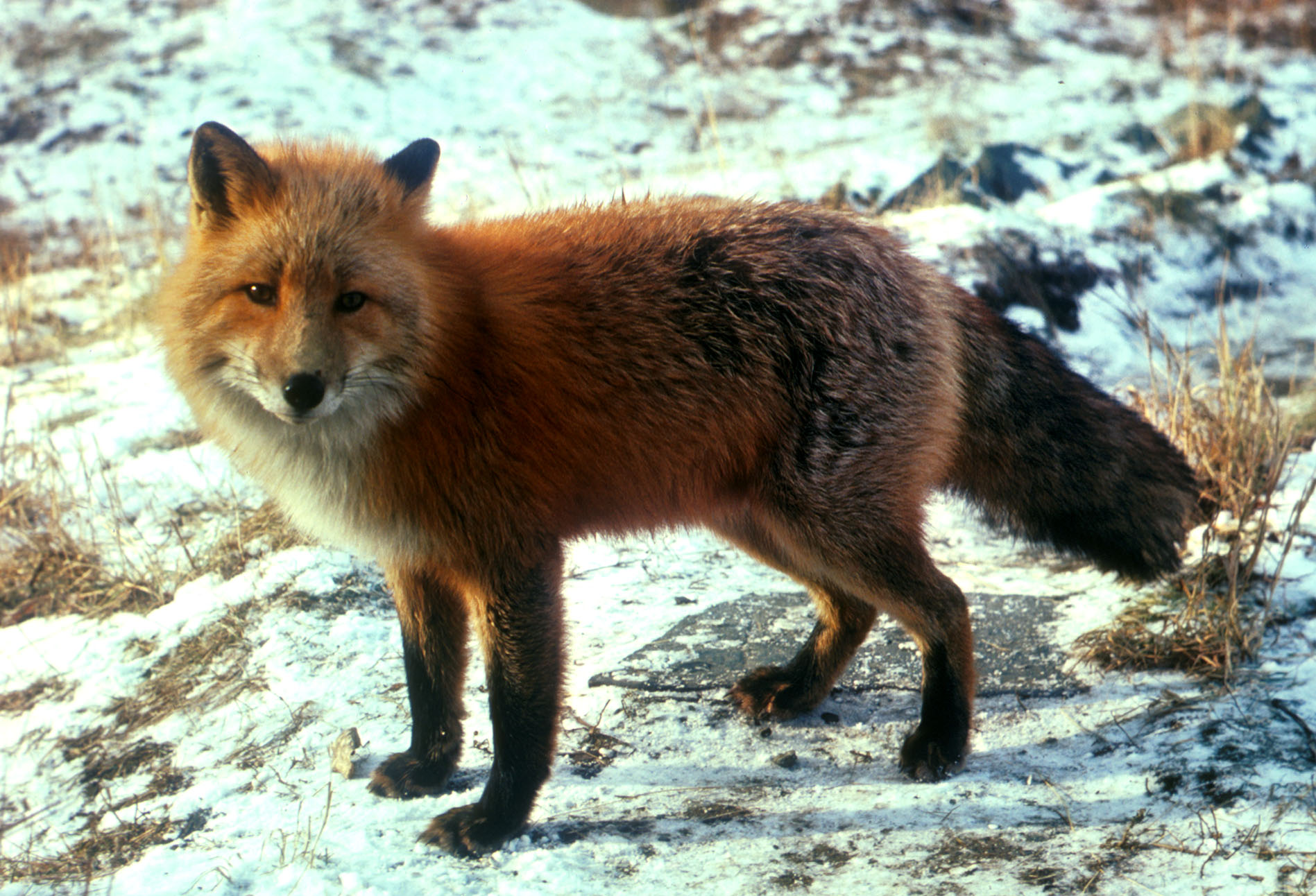
An eastern American red fox in its winter coat

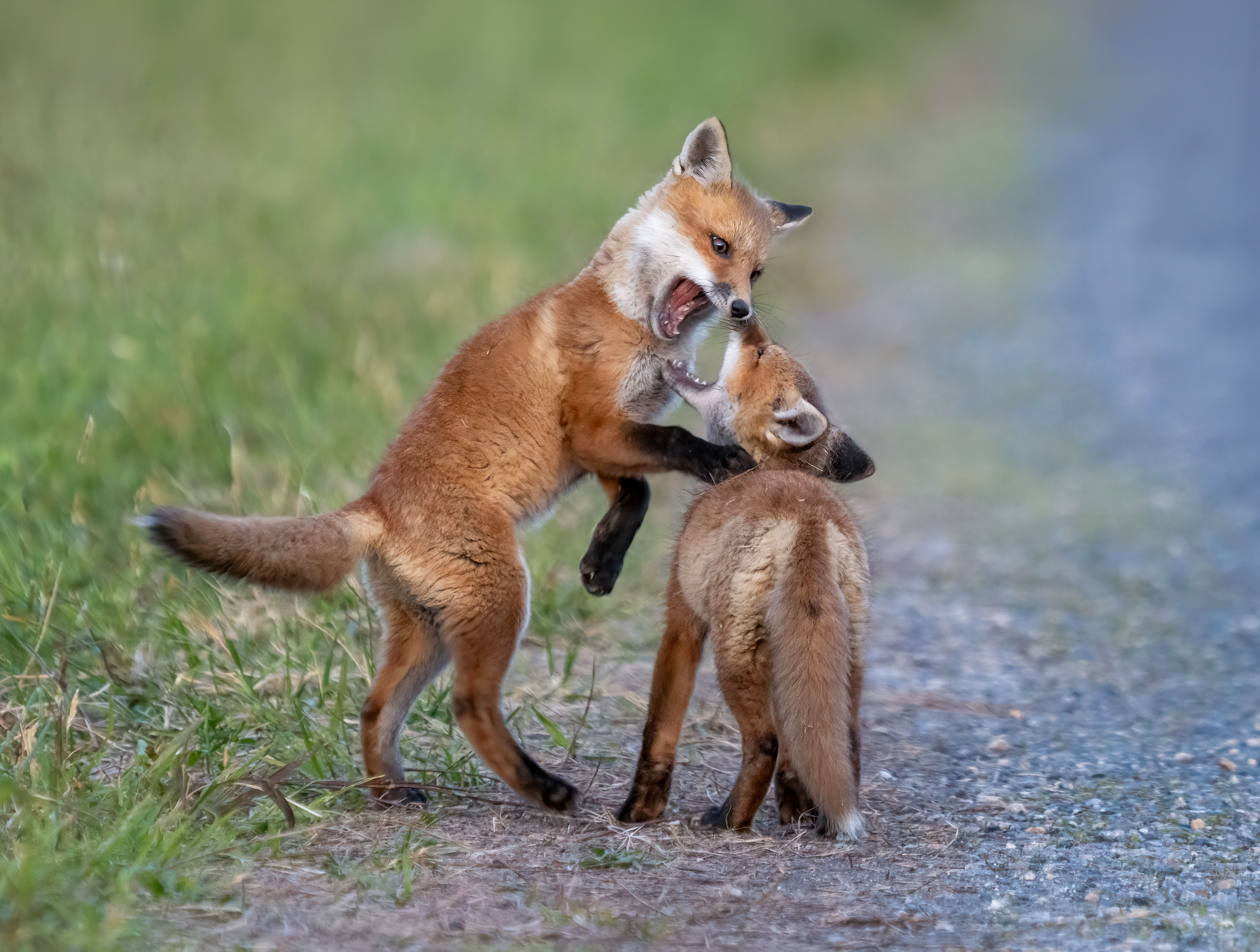
Two eastern American red fox kits playing in Delaware

Vulpes vulpes fulva inhabits the entirety of Canada and most of the United States (east of the Rocky Mountains, except the southern Great Plains and southern Texas). The eastern American red fox generally prefers mixed vegetation communities that occur on edge habitats with a high level of diversity. In developed areas, the eastern American red fox will inhabit areas that offer a combination of woodland and agricultural land.

== Diet, hunting behavior, and feeding behavior ==
The eastern American red fox has a primarily carnivorous diet dominated by small mammals. However, as an opportunistic subspecies they will adopt an omnivorous diet that includes plants, fruits, berries, birds, insects and other small animals. Food sources can vary depending on region, but cottontail rabbits (Sylvilagus sp.) are the most important prey for eastern American red foxes. The eastern American red fox will consume larger animals as carrion and their diet changes depending on seasonal variability. Being nocturnal, foxes will choose to hunt and forage for food at night. However, it is not uncommon to see red foxes active during the day as well. This is especially true in neighborhoods and other populated areas, where red foxes can find human trash or pet food left outside.

== Sources ==
- Aubry, K.B.; Statham, M.J.; Sacks, B.N.; Perrine, J.D.; Wisely, S.M. (2009). "Phylogeography of the North American red fox: Vicariance in Pleistocene forest refugia". Molecular Ecology. 18 (12): 2668–2686. Bibcode:2009MolEc..18.2668A. doi:10.1111/j.1365-294x.2009.04222.x. PMID 19457180. S2CID 11518843.
- Frey, J.K. (2013). "Re-evaluation of the evidence for the importation of red foxes from Europe to colonial America: Origins of the southeastern red fox (Vulpes vulpes fulva)". Biological Conservation. 158: 74–79. Bibcode:2013BCons.158...74F. doi:10.1016/j.biocon.2012.07.027.
- Hall, E. Raymond (1981). The Mammals of North America. Vol. 2 (2nd ed.). Wiley. ISBN 9780047105449.
- Kamler, J.F.; Ballard, W.B. (2002). "A review of native and nonnative red foxes in North America". Wildlife Society Bulletin. 30 (2): 370–379.
- Statham, M.J.; Sacks, B.N.; Aubry, K.B.; Perrine, J.D.; Wisely, S.M. (2012). "The origin of recently established red fox populations in the United States: translocations or natural range expansions". Journal of Mammalogy. 93 (1). American Society of Mammalogists: 52–65. doi:10.1644/11-mamm-a-033.1.
- Statham, Mark J.; Murdoch, James; Janecka, Jan; Aubry, Keith B.; Edwards, Ceiridwen J.; Soulsbury, Carl D.; Berry, Oliver; Wang, Zhenghuan; Harrison, David; Pearch, Malcolm; Tomsett, Louise; Chupasko, Judith; Sacks, Benjamin N. (October 2014). "Range-wide multilocus phylogeography of the red fox reveals ancient continental divergence, minimal genomic exchange and distinct demographic histories". Molecular Ecology. 23 (19). Wiley: 4813–4830. Bibcode:2014MolEc..23.4813S. doi:10.1111/mec.12898. PMID 25212210. S2CID 25466489.
- Tesky, Julie L. (1995). "Vulpes vulpes". Fire Effects Information System (FEIS). Forest Service, United States Department of Agriculture.
