= ASR-11 =

Digital Airport Surveillance Radar (DASR)

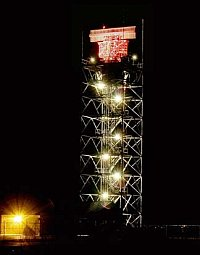
- ASR-11 during night operation
- Country of origin: United States
- Manufacturer: Raytheon
- Introduced: 1998; 27 years ago
- Type: Airport surveillance radar
- Frequency: S band 2.7–2.9 GHz (11–10 cm)
- PRF: 4 CPIs (~1000 Hz avg.); 5 pulses per CPI; Staggered PRFs
- Beamwidth: 1.4° horizontal; 5° vertical
- Pulsewidth: 1.0 μs short-range, 80 μs long range
- RPM: 12.5 RPM
- Range: Primary: 60 NM (110 km; 69 mi); Secondary: 120 NM (220 km; 140 mi)
- Power: 25 kW peak; 2.1 kW average

ASR-11, also known as the Digital Airport Surveillance Radar (DASR), is an advanced radar system utilized by the United States as the next generation of terminal air traffic control. The ASR-11 is an upgraded, advanced version of the previous ASR-9 radar. This system was developed through a joint effort by the Federal Aviation Administration, the Department of Defense and the United States Air Force, who took most of the lead development tasks.

The military nomenclature for DASR is AN/GPN-30. In accordance with the Joint Electronics Type Designation System (JETDS), the "AN/GPN-30" designation represents the 30th design of an Army-Navy electronic device for a ground radar navigational aid. The JETDS system is also now used to name US Air Force and some NATO, Australian and Canadian military electronics systems.

== Operation ==
Much like the previous ASR-9, known to the military as AN/GPN-27, the ASR-11 has been deployed to airports across the United States to meet the requirements of a digital, automated air traffic monitoring system. The main purpose of the ASR-11's development was to replace aging radar systems at airfields that did not receive the ASR-9, as well as use across the world by the US military. Many of the advanced parameters such as weather and digital pinpoint monitoring found in the ASR-9 are also found in the ASR-11.

DASR consists of two separate electronic subsystems consisting of a primary radar and a monopulse secondary surveillance radar, often referred to as the beacon. Like the ASR-9, the ASR-11 uses a continuously rotating linear and circular polarized tower-mounted antenna with a beamwidth of 1.4° horizontal and 5° vertical.

Transmitted electromagnetic signals reflect off the surface of more than 1,000 aircraft within sixty nautical miles of the radar location. The reflected signals received are sent to the processing equipment which measures the echo delay, or the amount of time it takes for the electromagnetic signals to return, and the direction from which they came. The processed information is relayed to an air traffic control (ATC) tower, or a terminal radar approach control (TRACON). That information contains digital tags describing location, heading, and speed at which the aircraft is moving. The overall operation of the ASR-11 is similar to that of the ASR-9, with relatively few differences between the two radar systems. There are only two main areas where the ASR-11 has an advantage over the ASR-9, with it also having some disadvantages due to its weather capability.

=== Advantages ===
The first advantage the ASR-11 offers over the ASR-9 is the use of a low peak power (25 kW), solid-state transmitter with pulse compression technology, replacing the ASR-9's high peak-power, short pulse power system. This gives the radar the ability to deliver the same amount of RF energy to a target at long range while making the radar less sensitive at shorter ranges. Any aircraft that comes closer than six nautical miles from the radar cannot be located with the long range pulse system built into the ASR-11. Installing additional radar equipment to the same antenna is required for close range location and weather detection.

The second advantage of using an ASR-11 is the radar's utilization of pulse sequence diversity resulting in the capability to limit processing dwells to a small number of pulses. This feature becomes most important when monitoring of air traffic is the primary use of the radar. Reducing the number of pulses transmitted by the radar has a direct adverse affect on Doppler resolution resulting in decreased ability to process live weather conditions.

=== Disadvantages ===
The main disadvantage of using an ASR-11 radar system is the aforementioned reduction of Doppler radar resolution. Like the ASR-9, the ASR-11 has an on-site, dedicated weather reflectivity processor, with six separate measured levels of precipitation reflectivity. The limited number of pulses sent out by the radar system has a direct effect on its ability to measure weather conditions. Unlike the ASR-9, the ASR-11 is less suited for wind shear detection, Doppler wind measurement, and precipitation reflectivity. The ASR-11 radar system will remain as is, with no further plans to upgrade the current detection system with a Weather Systems Processor (WSP.)
