= Frances A. Crane Wildlife Management Area =

Protected area in Massachusetts, US

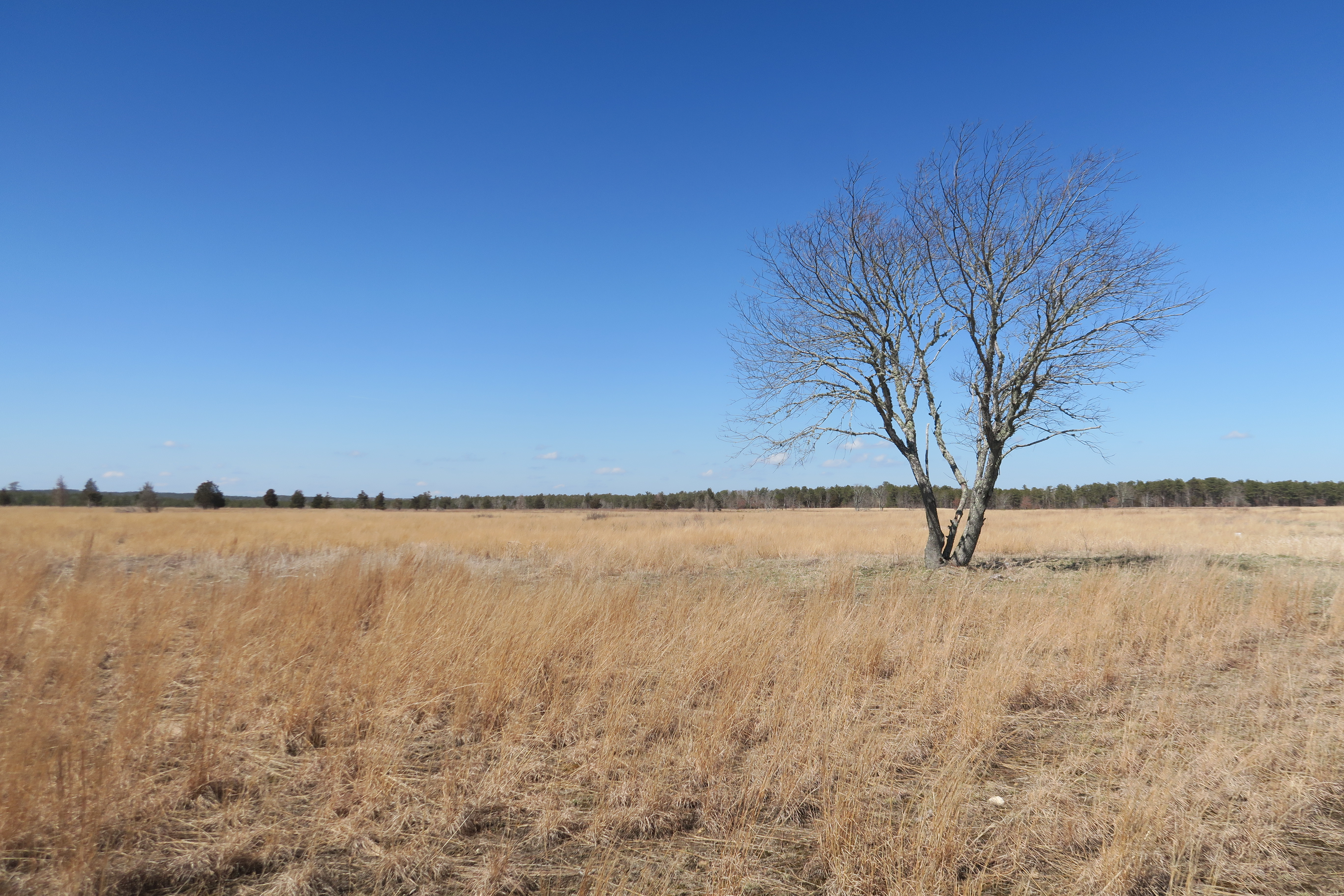
- Frances A. Crane Wildlife Management Area

- Location within Cape Cod
- Location: Falmouth, Massachusetts, USA
- Coordinates: 41°38′19″N 70°33′55″W
- Area: 1,883 acres (7.62 km^{2})
- Established: 1958
- Governing body: Massachusetts Department of Fisheries and Game

Frances A. Crane Wildlife Management Area is a wildlife management area (WMA) in Falmouth, Massachusetts, operated by the state Department of Fish and Game.

== Geography ==
Crane WMA covers 1,883 acres (7.62 km^{2}) of flat and rolling land in the inland village of Hatchville within the town of Falmouth, Massachusetts in the southwestern part of Cape Cod. The WMA's land is mostly meadowland and coniferous forest on top of a dry, sandy surface.

To the south and west of Crane WMA lie Massachusetts Route 151 and Massachusetts Route 28, respectively, with residential areas beyond them. To the north and west lies the 22,000-acre Joint Base Cape Cod, which is mostly undeveloped aside from Otis Air National Guard Base.

== History ==
The land that is now Crane WMA was owned by the family of Charles Crane until 1958, when the state bought the land with the intent of turning it into a wildlife management area, to promote conservation and create designated hunting grounds. The state restored the land to its current combination of forest and grassland, planting roughly 5,000 conifers and 30 acres of native wildgrass on the former site of the Falmouth airport. Pre-existing buildings on the property were demolished, and native animals, including foxes and a variety of bird species, began to return.

The WMA is named for the daughter of Charles Crane, who died in a car accident in Falmouth in 1954. Frances Crane's sons were in charge of selling the land to the state and requested that it be named for their mother.

== Wildlife ==
Much of the forested parts of Crane WMA are composed of pitch pines and scrub oaks. The low-lying plant species in the WMA's grasslands include the rare Nantucket shadbush.

Crane is home to a wide variety of animal species, including deer, rabbits, squirrels, foxes, coyotes, and grouse, as well as pheasants and quail, both of which are restocked annually for hunting. Less common bird species in the area include the black-billed cuckoo, common yellowthroat, Eastern towhee, field sparrow, indigo bunting, prairie warbler, and tree swallow. Woodcock, box turtles, and several rare varieties of moths and butterflies can also be found.

== Usage ==
Crane WMA has an extensive trail system and is popular with mountain bikers, hikers, hunters, and horseback riders. It is also the site of the annual Cape Cod Trail Race, a series of races of varying distances held every April by the Falmouth Track Club over a 10-kilometer course.
