= Operational display system =

System for tracking multiple objects

Operational Display Systems are systems used for tracking the status of multiple objects in air traffic control. Operational Display Systems are usually developed by large countries' civil aviation authorities, such as the Federal Aviation Administration (FAA) in the United States, or the main European service providers including Deutsche Flugsicherung (DFS), National Air Traffic Services (NATS), DSNA, ENAIRE, and Maastricht Upper Area Control Centre (MUAC), coordinated by Eurocontrol in Europe.

== System evolution ==
Air traffic control systems gradually evolved from the old sweeping radar to modern computer-driven systems showing maps, weather information, aircraft routes, and digitized radar tracks on an ergonomically designed console.

The development of radar technology during World War II revolutionized air traffic control, allowing controllers to detect and track aircraft in real-time. Whereas in the past information came only from radar, current systems use inputs from a variety of sources. Radar remains central but is now complemented by transponder data (aircraft sending out information regarding altitude and identification) and increasingly by satellite data for more accurate positioning and navigation.

As most data is now digital, advanced digital functionalities are now embedded in modern Operational Display Systems. Those technologies include trajectory prediction, conflict warnings, traffic flow management, and arrival optimization. Two separate competing systems are currently operating within the US, Common ARTS (Automated Radar Terminal System (Lockheed Martin)) and STARS (Raytheon), with Common ARTS operating at the busiest facilities (New York, Dallas, Atlanta, Southern California, Chicago, Washington D.C. area, Denver, St. Louis, Minneapolis and San Francisco area) within the US.

== Display technologies ==
On the display side, the round radar scope has been progressively replaced by computer-driven systems. Early computer systems used cathode-ray tubes (CRTs), which offered high contrast and durability. Modern en route systems increasingly employ LCD flat screens. However, many U.S. Air Traffic TRACON (Terminal Radar Approach Control) facilities and towers still use older cathode-ray tube technology.

Most larger TRACONs employ 20-inch by 20-inch color tube displays. Common ARTS uses the ARTS Color Display (ACD) and Remote ARTS Color Tower Display (R-ACD), while STARS uses the Terminal Control Workstation (TCW) and Tower Display Workstation (TDW). Towers are gradually replacing older DBrite cathode-ray remote displays with LCD technology manufactured by Barco, though these replacements are currently installed only at the busiest facilities, with lower-density traffic facilities scheduled for retrofit later.
