= Hatchville, Massachusetts =

- Village
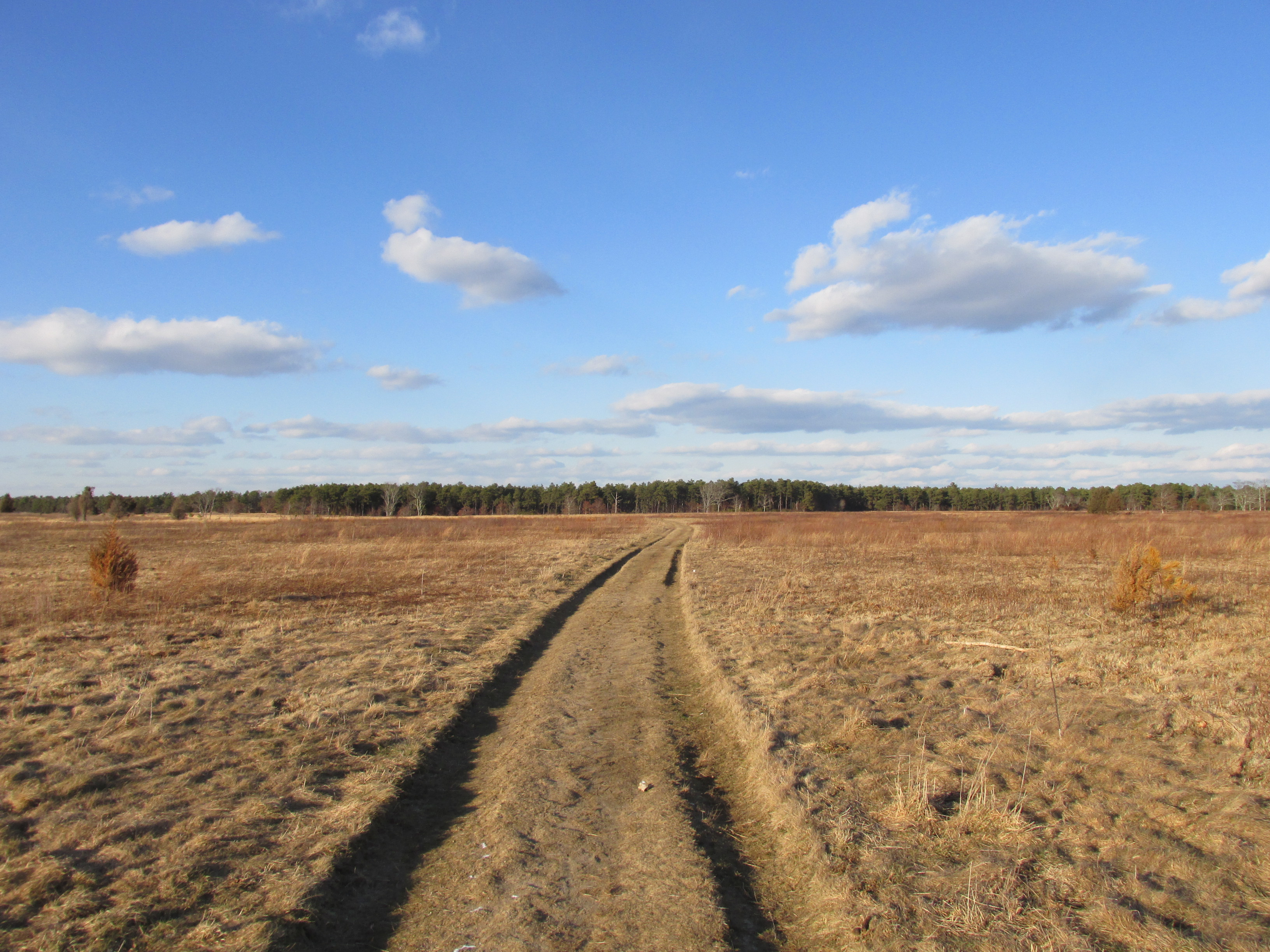
- Pheasant Area; Frances A. Crane Wildlife Management Area

- Location within Cape Cod
- Coordinates: 41°37′45″N 70°33′48″W
- Country: United States
- State: Massachusetts
- County: Barnstable
- Town: Falmouth
- Elevation: 92 ft (28 m)

Population (2010)
  - Total: 9,264
- Time zone: UTC-5 (Eastern (EST))
  - Summer (DST): UTC-4 (EDT)
- ZIP codes: 02536
- Area codes: 508, 774

Hatchville is a neighborhood within the town of Falmouth, Massachusetts, on Cape Cod, United States. The mailing address for the area is East Falmouth, to the south of Hatchville.

== Geography ==
Hatchville is located in the northern part of the town of Falmouth, surrounding Coonamessett Pond. Massachusetts Route 151 (Nathan Ellis Highway) borders the northern side of the community, leading east into Mashpee and west to North Falmouth, ending at Route 28 in each direction. The elevation of Hatchville is 92 feet (28 m) above sea level. Hatchville is a very small agricultural village that is mainly made up of rural, low-populated land. It is home to the Coonamessett Farm.

The Coonamessett River flows through Hatchville, feeding local cranberry bogs.

Hatchville is the home of the Frances A. Crane Wildlife Management Area, one of the largest wildlife preserves on Cape Cod. The wildlife preserve is located on the south side of Route 151, in the eastern part of Hatchville.

== Notable person ==
- Paul Harney, PGA golf player, 1974 PGA Professional of the Year, resided in Hatchville and owned and created his own golf course in Hatchville.
