= ASR-9 =

United States airport surveillance radar

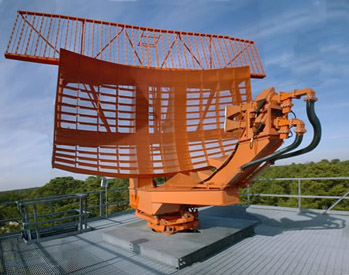
- Country of origin: United States
- Introduced: 1986
- Type: Airport surveillance radar
- Frequency: 2.7–2.9 GHz (S band)
- PRF: 2 CPIs (~1000 Hz)
- Pulsewidth: 1.0 μs
- RPM: 12.5
- Azimuth: 1.4º
- Elevation: 5º
- Power: 1.1 MW

ASR-9 is an airport surveillance radar system admitted into the National Airspace System (NAS), to be utilized by the Federal Aviation Administration to monitor civilian and commercial air traffic within the United States. Developed by Westinghouse, ASR-9 was the first radar system to display air traffic, and weather conditions simultaneously. The ASR-9 is mainly intended to monitor and track aircraft below 25,000 ft and within forty to sixty nautical miles from the airport of operation. The ASR radar systems were widely used where an advanced radar system was needed, consisting of 135 different ASR-9 operating locations around the U.S. The FAA is currently working to upgrade the remaining ASR-9 radar sites to a modernized digital version known as the ASR-11.

== Operation ==
At the time of the ASR-9 installment, the system was a significant improvement over the S-band ASR radars being used by airports. The radar system was designed to meet, or exceed the need of a terminal Air Traffic Control Automation facility through the year 2005. The ASR-9 utilized a dual beam antenna, a dual channel antenna, a linear-wide range receiver and new digital processing equipment. The processor installed on the ASR-9 was far more advanced than processors that had been used on previous models. Some of the major areas that the digital processor was superior to earlier versions, the use of an optimum clutter filter bank, a fine-grained ground mapping threshold and mean level thresholding on the weather bands. Combining all of the upgraded components, the ASR-9 provided a significantly improved ability to detect aircraft in the presence of ground clutter, or weather clutter such as torrential rains. The new and improved processor on the ASR-9 also enhances the ability to detect hazardous weather conditions that could affect flight, landing and take off of various aircraft. A new solid state design and Remote Maintenance Monitoring significantly improved the overall availabilities of the ASR-9, as well as lowering the monthly operation costs.

== Design ==
When Westinghouse first started development of the ASR-9, it was primarily to upgrade the aging ASR-4, -5 and -6 radar equipment at locations that did not receive the previous version, the ASR-8. The ASR-9 monitoring system was formally designated by the FAA to be used as a Primary Radar replacement, as well as a live weather condition monitor utilized from the Air Traffic Control tower. ASR-9 was the first Radar System to enable the detection of a moving target with circular polarization, therefore significantly enhancing the ability to locate aircraft in various weather conditions. In addition to the enhanced detection system, six separate weather channels can be switched on to display the precipitation reflectivity measured from the vertical elevation beam. The measurements taken by the weather system are updated every 30 seconds to increase the accuracy. The Federal Aviation Administration has chosen different 35 sites around the United States to receive a Weather Systems Processor (WSP) upgrade to be added to the existing ASR-9's. This new processor monitored Doppler wind velocity, enabling the detection of low-altitude wind shear around airports. The Weather Systems Processor also improved the ASR-9's accuracy of precipitation reflectivity measurements taken by eliminating the amount of ground clutter picked up by the radar sweeps. The WSP provided velocity imagery, as well as full resolution reflectivity that extends all the way to the end of the ASR-9's monitor range of sixty nautical miles. The WSP sweep images are updated every 4.8 seconds, with a range of fifteen nautical miles where the processors operate the wind shear algorithms. Launching the upgrade program for the ASR-9's radar processor will ultimately enhance the amount of weather data the computer can process, leading to an even greater weather surveillance range of up to one hundred twenty nautical miles.

== Antenna ==
The antenna used on the ASR-9 was a state of the art horned shaped reflector that forms two cosecant-squared beams to allow high elevation gain, as well as coverage up to forty-two degrees in elevation coverage. The two beams that pulse from the ASR-9 are nearly identical; however, a minimal displacement in height between the two beams causes a coverage change of approximately four degrees elevation. The upper beam on the ASR-9 is used primarily for short range reception, while the lower beam was mainly used for transmitting as well as long range reception. A combination of beam displacement, as well as a sharp underside cut off, gave the ASR-9 a technological advantage when compared to previously installed ASR systems; the radar systems before the ASR-9 had not been able to reject ground clutter when transmitting with the upper beam.

== Miscellaneous ==
- Building - Each ASR-9 site of installation received a prefabricated metal building with a dedicated generator engine room. The building size was approximately 60 ft long, 24 ft wide, and 12 feet in height. The generator room allows an addition of another 24 ft in length, 14 ft wide, and 12 ft in height. If the site of installment had a currently operating ASR radar, the equipment present met the standards to be modified and re-used.
- Engine Generator - The equipment used on the ASR-9 is 50 kW generator engine, as well as the associated equipment to provide emergency electricity in the case of a power outage.
- Antenna Tower - In the addition of a new ASR radar site, including the upgrade of an ASR-7 or an ASR-8, a new antenna tower had to be fabricated. The tower was built in 10 ft sections from 17–77 ft in height. If the site chosen for an upgrade was that of an ASR-4, -5, or -6, no new radar tower was required.
