= Common ARTS =

Air traffic control computer system

Common ARTS (or Automated Radar Terminal System) is an air traffic control computer system, a type of operational display system, that air traffic controllers use to track aircraft.

The computer system is used to automate the air traffic controller's job by correlating the various radar and human inputs in a meaningful way. This system is being used in most of the TRACONs (Terminal Radar Approach Control) around the United States. Common ARTS is the most modern implementation of ARTS in use at various locations in the United States. Standard Terminal Automation Replacement System (STARS) was designed to replace Common ARTS at all the US TRACONS, however that project was stalled until 2010.

The United States Federal Aviation Administration announced in Spring 2011 that STARS will be replacing the 11 largest CARTS sites under the TAMR Segment 3 Phase 1 plan. The remaining CARTS sites will be replaced under TAMR Segment 3 Phase 2 in the near future.

== RADAR automation ==
A typical short range radar used in air traffic control scans an area of about 60 miles every 4–6 seconds. The primary signal returned will contain the range and azimuth of a target. Automation will correlate these targets scan to scan and make estimates of speed and direction. A secondary signal may be available, containing the aircraft transponder code, and possibly altitude (and possibly other information if Mode S). The automation will correlate the primary and secondary signals, and measure horizontal and vertical speed estimates.

Once the automation systems know the details of the aircraft it is tracking, this information is available on the display, as part of the data block near the aircraft representation. The information will typically show an aircraft ID, if the transponder code is associated with a known flight plan, the altitude and speed.

Other systems can use the speed and direction information. The safety systems need to use this information. The conflict alert system will compare the direction, altitude and speed of multiple aircraft to see if there are any possibilities of aircraft being too close together. Maps of the area along with Mode C or S transponder elevations will allow minimum safe altitude warning systems to warn controllers of possible terrain conflicts.

Additional systems may include any of the Final Approach Spacing (FAST or pFAST) tools available, User Request Evaluation Tool and Parallel Runway monitors.

=== History ===
ARTS was developed in the late 1960s by the Univac division of Sperry Rand to help automate the TRACONs' operations in the United States. The system was built around a militarized Univac mainframe using the same basic processor architecture as used in the Naval Tactical Data System and the civilian UNIVAC 490 series. Univac was awarded a multi-year contract in February 1969 to deliver 64 ARTS III installations. Each ARTS III system consisted of three subsystems, namely the Data acquisition subsystem, the Data processing subsystem and the Data Entry and display subsystem. Burroughs Corporation received the subcontract for the Data acquisition subsystem, while the Data Entry and Display subsystem was subcontracted to Texas Instruments. The Data processing system was built around the UNIVAC 8303 IOP (I/O Processor) which could be configured in a multiprocessor configuration, depending on the specific air traffic control site (New York had the largest).

In 1986, Univac and Burroughs Corporations merged – creating Unisys.

By the early 1980s an effort was proposed to port the ARTS functionality to microprocessors. Unisys began this program, and the name changed to CommonARTS. The CommonARTS processes were running on Motorola 68000 microprocessors. The software was mostly rewritten in the C language, running on various real-time operating systems.

In the 1990s, Unisys split out some of the defense work, and Lockheed Martin acquired the air traffic management unit.

In the 1990s, most of the Common ARTS software was ported to PowerPC processors, still using the same source code, but with larger memory footprint, allowing control of more aircraft. By 1997, there were 131 small to medium TRACONS and five large TRACONS running Common ARTS software. The PowerPC also allowed the display software to drive ARTS color displays, replacing the vector-based ARTs displays.

The STARS program was started to replace the Common ARTS systems at all TRACONS in the late 1990s.

In the late 1990s, Automatic dependent surveillance-broadcast support was added to Common ARTS software to augment RADAR sensors. Multiple sensor inputs were added including long range allowing larger TRACONS to have variable size and shape sectors, since they no longer needed to have round coverage areas matching a single sensor scan area.

== Sources ==
- Look about page 18-21
- http://www.usfamily.net/web/labenson/Legacy_files/Eagan_ATC_history.pdf
- "Raytheon Teams With Lockheed Martin For Faa Air Traffic Control Modernization - En Route Automation Modernization program". EDP Weekly's IT Monitor. 43 (27). Archived from the original on January 30, 2005 – via FindArticles.
- http://www.linuxjournal.com/article/7066
- http://www.tc.faa.gov/acb300/techreports/HighAltitude_memo.pdf
