= Chatham Municipal Airport =

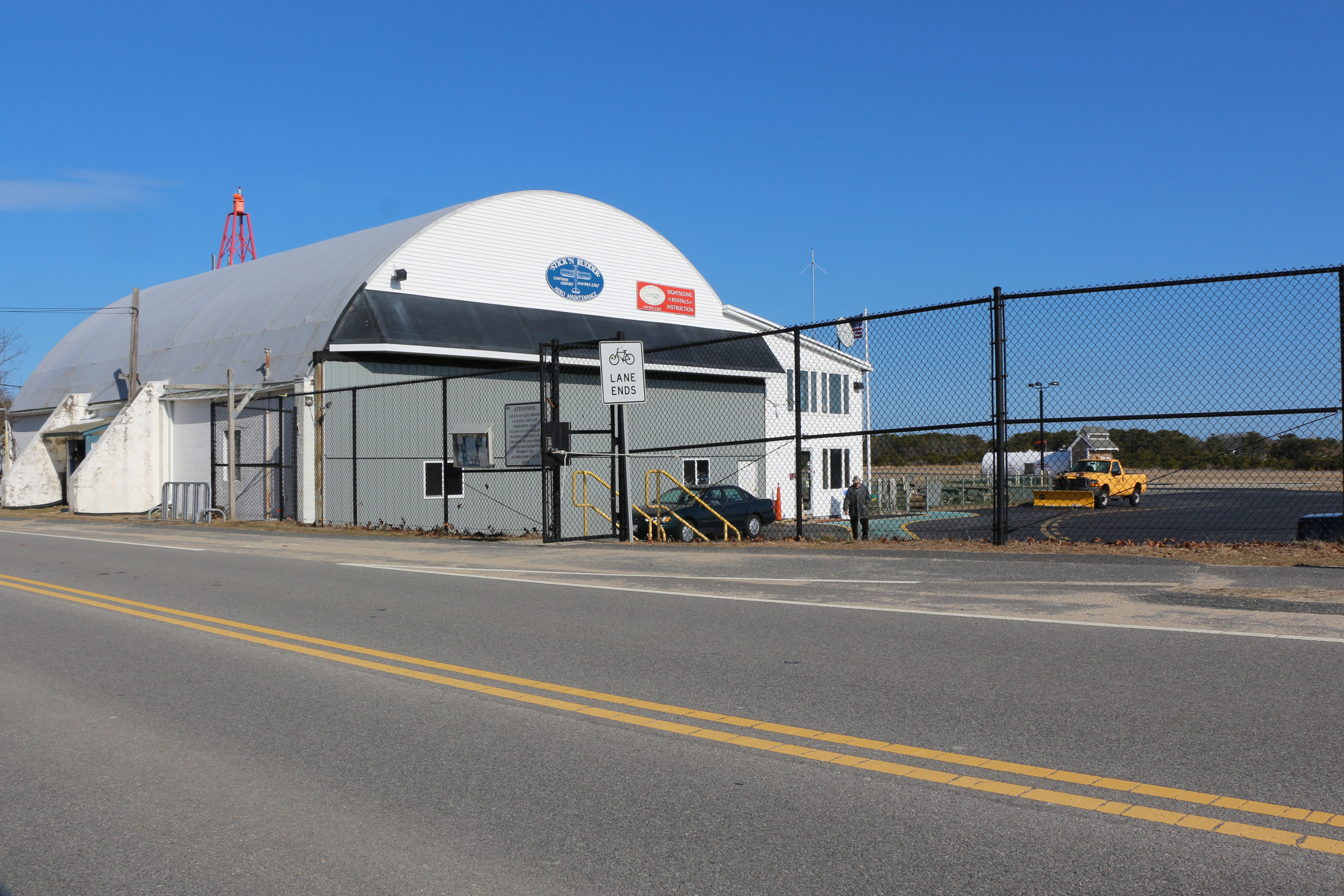
- IATA: none; ICAO: KCQX; FAA LID: CQX; WMO: 74494

Summary
- Airport type: Public
- Owner: Town of Chatham
- Location: Chatham, Massachusetts
- Elevation AMSL: 68 ft (21 m)
- Coordinates: 41°41′18″N 069°59′22″W

Map
- Interactive map of Chatham Municipal Airport
- Source: Federal Aviation Administration

Chatham Municipal Airport (ICAO: KCQX, FAA LID: CQX) is a public airport located two miles (3 km) northwest of the central business district of Chatham, a town in Barnstable County, Massachusetts, United States. The airport is owned by the Town of Chatham.

It has a full-service FBO (Cape Cod Flying Circus) and maintenance facility in their main building (Stick N Rudder Aero Maintenance). The flight school and sightseeing are operated by Cape Aerial Tours. Upstairs, there is also a restaurant and coffee company, Hangar B and B-Side, respectively, serving breakfast and lunch.

== Facilities and aircraft ==
Chatham Municipal Airport covers an area of 105 acres (42 ha).

Runway information
Dimensions	3001 x 100 ft. / 915 x 30m	
Surface	Asphalt, in good condition	
Weight bearing capacity	Single wheel: 30.0	
Runway edge lights	Medium intensity	
	Runway 6	Runway 24
Latitude	41-41.120275N	41-41.476242N
Longitude	069-59.607752W	069-59.150505W
Elevation (MSL)	48.9 ft	62.4 ft
Gradient	0.5%	0.5%
Traffic pattern	Left	Left
Runway heading	060 magnetic 044 true	240 magnetic 224 true
Markings	Basic, in good condition	Basic, in good condition
Visual slope indicator	2-light PAPI on left (3.50 degrees glide path)	2-light PAPI on right (3.50 degrees glide path)
Touchdown point	Yes, no lights	Yes, no lights
Obstructions	120 ft. trees, 800 ft. from runway, 150 ft. right of centerline, 5:1 slope to clear	232 ft. tank, 3100 ft. from runway, 75 ft. left of centerline, 12:1 slope to clear

Airport services
Fuel available	100LL, JET-A
Parking	Hangars and tiedowns
Airframe service	Major
Powerplant service	Major
Bottled oxygen	None
Bulk oxygen	None

Airport communications
CTAF/UNICOM	122.8
WX ASOS	135.875 (508) 945-5034
Clearance delivery	127.3
BOSTON APCH/DEP	118.2
Airport manager	(508) 945-9000

For the 12-month period ending December 31, 2015 the airport averaged 55 aircraft operations per day: 57% local general aviation, 40% transient general aviation, 2% air taxi and <1% military. There are 37 aircraft based at this airport: 34 single engine, 2 multi-engine and 1 helicopter.

== See also ==
- List of airports in Massachusetts
