= Standard Terminal Automation Replacement System =

Air traffic control system

The Standard Terminal Automation Replacement System (STARS) is an air traffic control automation system, a type of operational display system, manufactured by Raytheon and is currently being used in many TRACONs around the United States by the FAA. STARS replaced the Automated Radar Terminal System (ARTS) at FAA air traffic control facilities across the US, as well as the previous automation systems employed by the DoD.

The STARS system receives and processes target reports, weather, and other non-target messages from both terminal and en route digital sensors. Additionally, it automatically tracks primary and secondary surveillance targets and provides aircraft position information to the enhanced traffic management system (ETMS). Finally, it also detects unsafe proximities between tracked aircraft pairs and provides a warning if tracked aircraft are detected at a dangerously low altitude. Additional features include converging runway display aid (CRDA) which displays "ghost" targets as an aid to controllers attempting to tightly space aircraft to converging/crossing runways in the terminal environment.

== Features ==
The system is currently being used at all TRACON sites throughout the US and USAF RAPCON, USN RATCF and USA ARAC terminal facilities.

STARS was installed as part of the FAA's TAMR project to replace the aging/obsolete ARTS hardware and software at TRACONS. TAMR Segment 3 Phase 1 replaced the 11 largest TRACONS CARTS with STARS. The smaller ARTS IIA sites transitioned to the STARS ELITE (Enhanced Local Integrated Tower Equipment) version of software and hardware, which is similar to TAMR, but with minimum redundancy. The FAA plans to complete this process in 2019.
