= Naval Auxiliary Air Station Martha's Vineyard =

Former military airport in Dukes County, Massachusetts, United States (1943–1946)

- Edgartown and West Tisbury, Massachusetts in United States

Site information
- Owner: United States Department of Defense
- Operator: United States Navy
- Open to the public: No

Location
- Coordinates: 41°23′35″N 70°36′52″W

Site history
- Built: 1943
- In use: 1943-1946
- Fate: Turned over to civilian use
- Battles/wars: World War II

Garrison information
- Occupants: Carrier Air Service Unit 22

Naval Auxiliary Air Station Martha's Vineyard was a United States Navy facility located in Edgartown and West Tisbury, Massachusetts operational from 1943 to 1946. It existed as an auxiliary air facility of Naval Air Station Quonset Point.

== History ==
The facility was commissioned within the borders of Manuel F. Correllus State Forest on 26 March, 1943 on land donated to the United States Navy from the Commonwealth of Massachusetts. Three 3,700 foot runways were built on the land, and were paved with asphalt. A crash boat and crew were based in Vineyard Haven, and a rocket firing range was set up in Katama near Edgartown Airfield, which was closed during the war. Five targets for gunnery and bombing were also set up at the Nomans Land Range. Carrier Air Service Unit 22 was stationed at the airfield to operate, service aircraft, and train personnel as well as tow target aircraft. It was renamed Naval Auxiliary Air Station in 1945. 21 Navy and Marine Corps squadrons passed through the station during the war, before it was decommissioned on 27 May, 1946. The state was immediately placed in caretaker status and leased to the county for civil aviation, and was eventually disposed of in 1959.

Today, the field operates as Martha's Vineyard Airport.

== See also ==
- List of military installations in Massachusetts
