= Katama, Massachusetts =

Coordinates: 41°21′45″N 70°31′00″W

Katama (/kəˈteɪmə/ kə-TAY-mə) is a residential area in the town of Edgartown, Massachusetts, on the south shore of the island of Martha's Vineyard. It is bordered on the west by Edgartown Great Pond, on the east by Katama Bay (separating Katama from the island of Chappaquiddick) and on the south by the Atlantic Ocean.

The word "Katama" comes from a Wampanoag word meaning "crab-fishing place."

The terrain is a flat outwash plain, characterized by sandy soil and few trees. It is sometimes referred to as the "Great Plains."

== History ==
Katama has been a popular summer resort since the late 19th century. From 1874–1896, Katama was the terminus of the Martha's Vineyard Railroad. The train Active ran between the Oak Bluffs Wharf and Mattakeeset Lodge in Katama. The Mattakeeset Lodge (note the spelling variations of Mattakesett) was located on the shore of Katama Bay and is pictured below in a photo from the New York Library collection. A portion of the lodge including one tower was incorporated into a wing of the Harbor View Hotel in Edgartown.

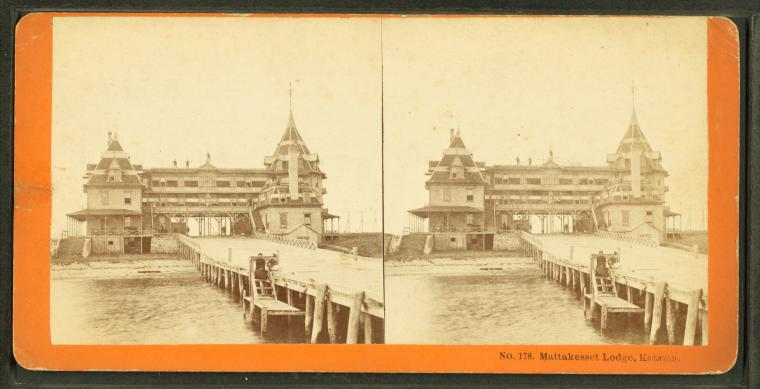
This shows a photo of the Mattakesset Lodge, the terminus of the Martha's Vineyard Railroad, in the late 19th century

The Katama plains were a part of the outer defense during World War II. Military barracks were built near the beach end of Katama Road—later the Katama Shores Inn owned by the Atwoods (the hotel where Mary Jo Kopechne spent her last night before her drowning on Chappaquiddick)—and more recently rebuilt as the Winnetu Ocean Resort. Running west from Mattakesett Way is a sunken concrete strip that runs west for approximately 3/4 of a mile. This is visible on the photo of the Katama Airfield as a line of trees running west from Mattakesett Way on a line demarcated by the Winnetu Resort. Machine gun ammunition or artillery shells were fired over the ocean from this point. The beach was also used as a practice target area for the army air squadrons assigned to the Martha's Vineyard Airport. Most of these bombs were inert, but some were live. Following the war this bombing activity was quickly forgotten and then rediscovered in the late 1980s when live bombs were uncovered by wave action on the receding beach. The beach was closed for more than a year while military demolition contractors identified and removed/detonated unexploded shells. Even today property owners find brass machine gun casings and barbed wire on their property from the World War II era.

Components of the Third Army, later led to fame by General George Patton in the sweep across France and the Battle of the Bulge, camped at Katama and practiced amphibious landings at Katama during the summer of 1943 prior to shipping to England in December 1943 as a part of the force being prepared for the D-day landings.

== Attractions ==
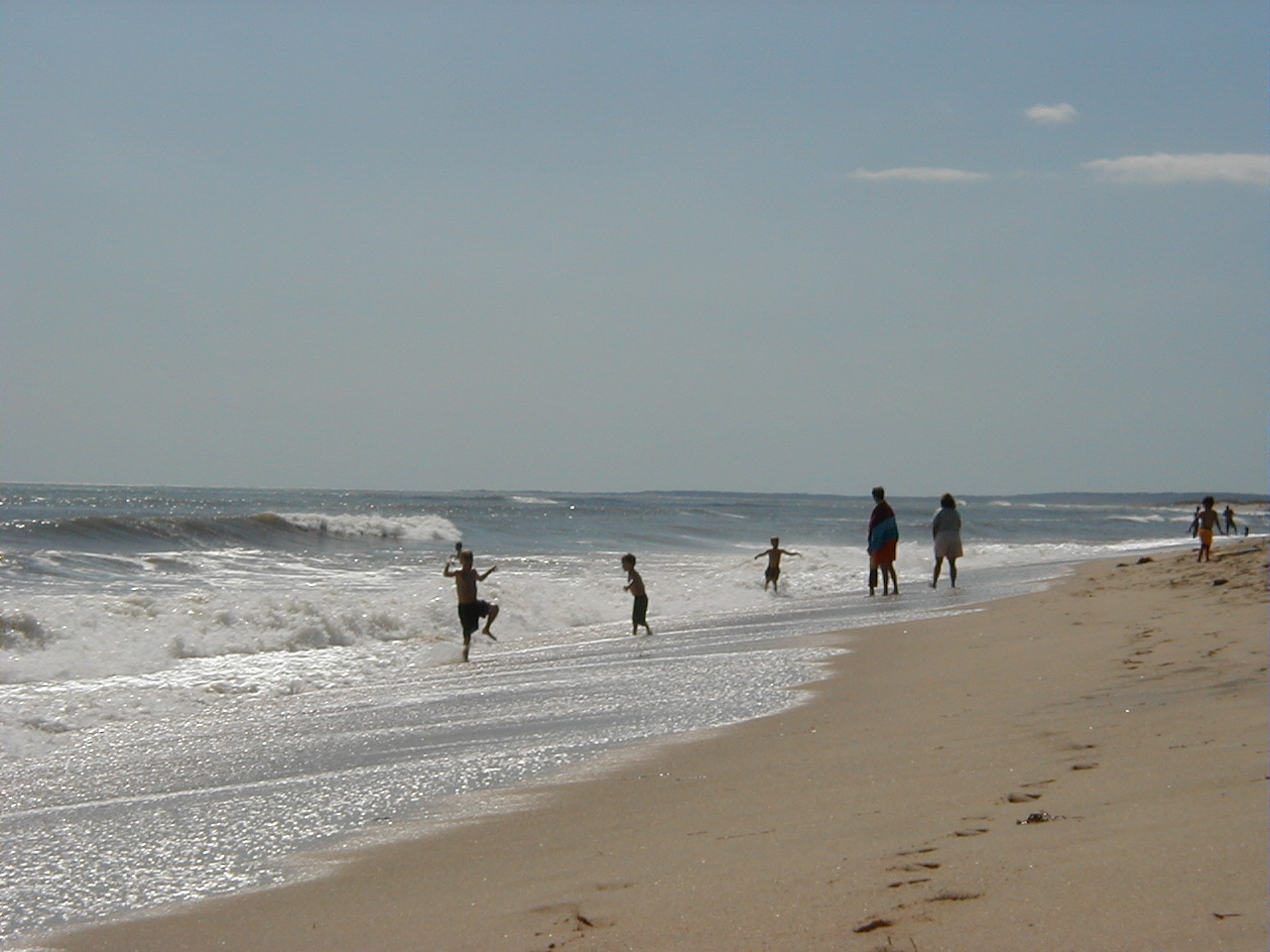
South Beach at Katama, Edgartown, MA. This is an open ocean beach with waves that range from docile to large and dangerous.

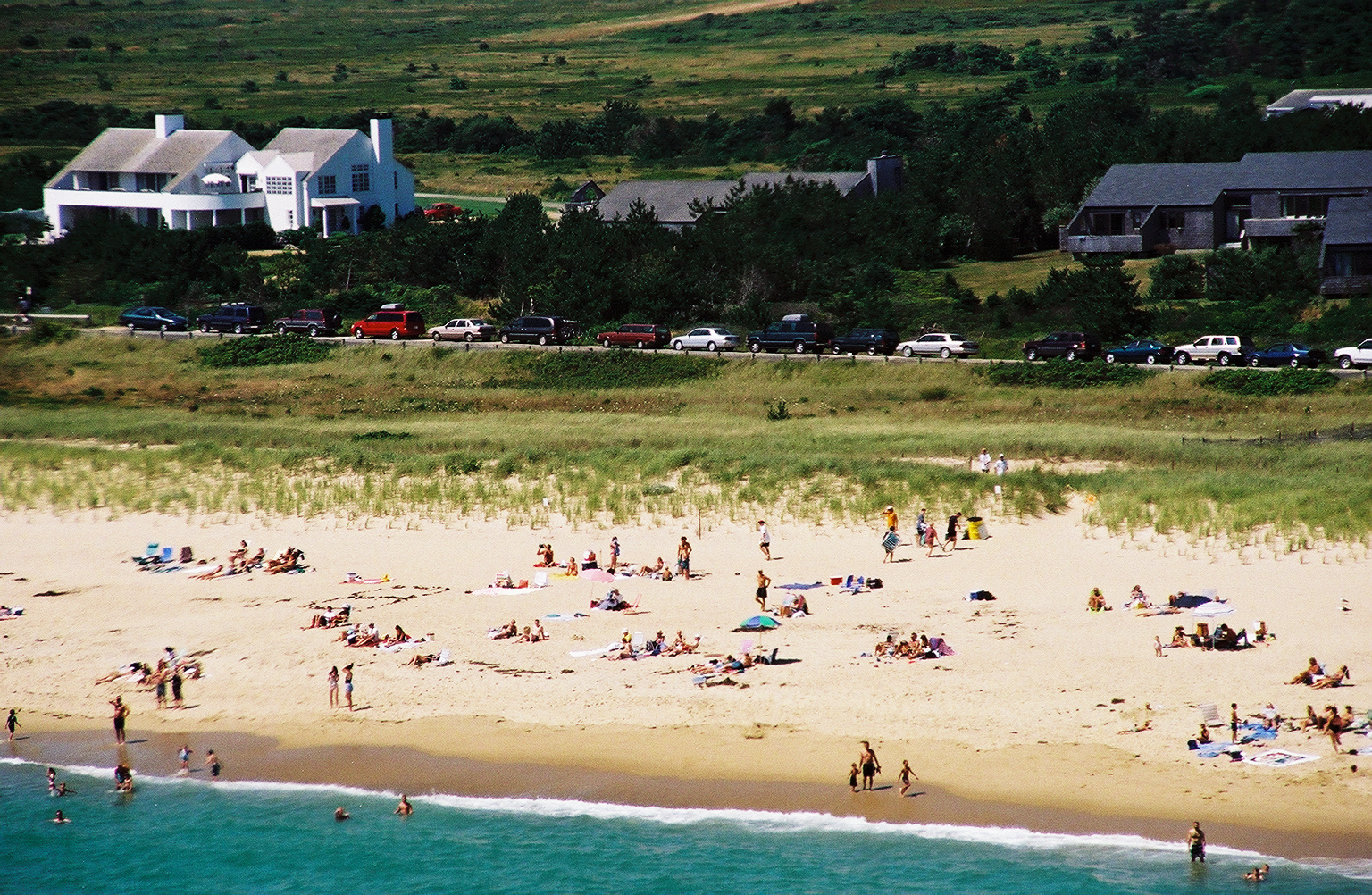
Aerial view of South Beach at Katama in 1998.

- South Beach runs the entire length of the southern end of Martha's Vineyard; however, the name "South Beach" commonly refers to a stretch of public beach that is demarcated by Herring Creek Road on the west and Chappaquiddick Island on the east. The name Norton Point is given to the stretch of beach that runs from Katama Road to Wasque Point, the southeastern most point of the beach on Chappaquiddick.
- Mattakesett refers to the southernmost portion of Katama immediately adjacent to the beach. Although the name dates back in written records to 1646, in recent times it has been most commonly associated with a resort named "Mattakesett", first developed in the mid-1970s, but named after the original 19th-century Mattakeset Lodge, which was the terminus of the Martha's Vineyard Railroad. This resort has been incorporated into the Winnetu Oceanside Resort, discussed below. A resort hotel named "Winnetu Ocean Resort" was opened in the same area in 2001. The term is also used in the street "Mattakesett Way"—which runs along the east side of Katama Airpark and The Right Fork Diner to Navy Way (see aerial photo in Katama Airpark)—and "Mattakesett Herring Creek" (a small tidal creek running parallel to South Beach that functioned as a herring run earlier in the 20th century; in recent years herring have returned in small numbers).

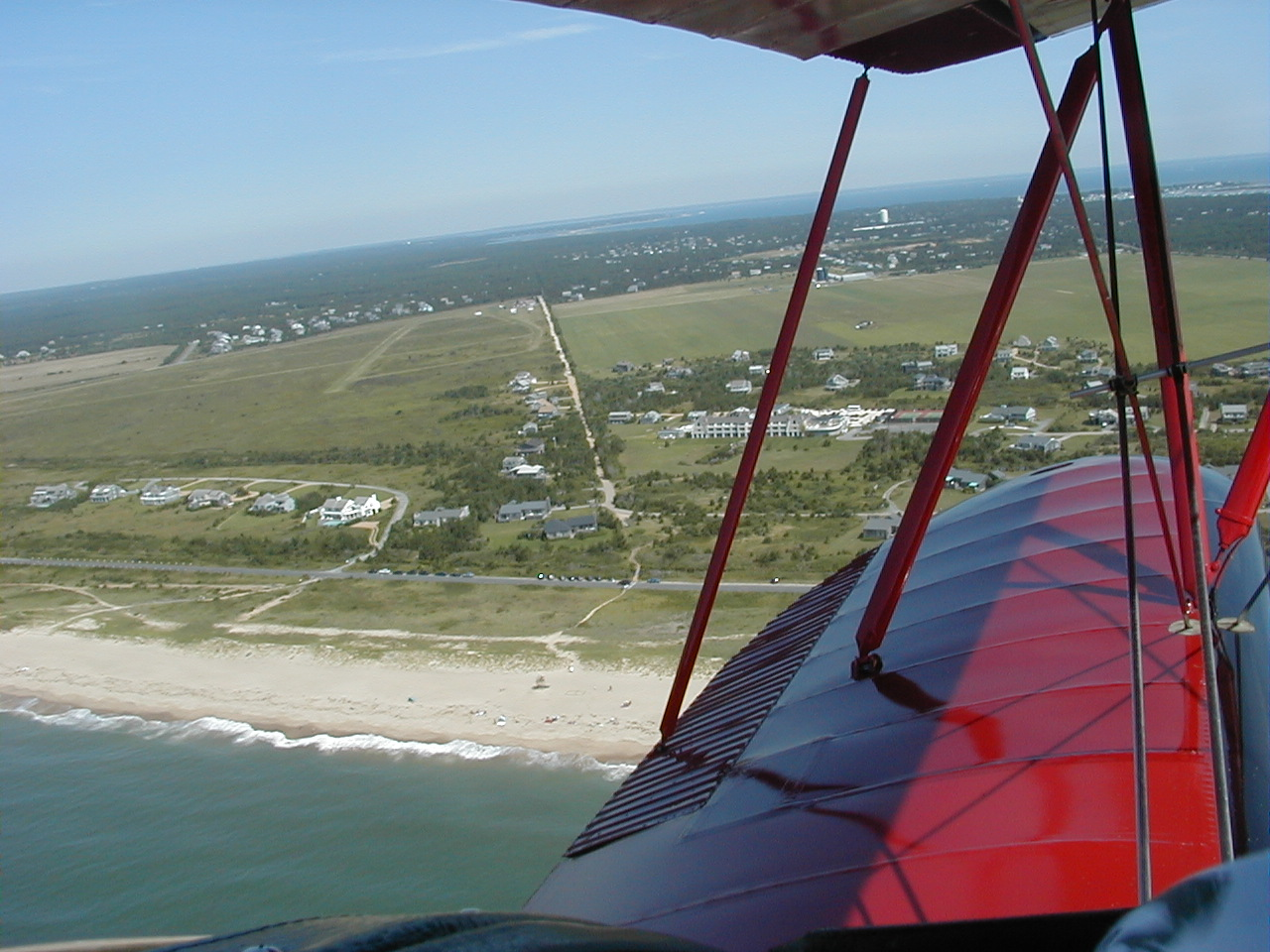
Aerial view of Katama (Edgartown) airfield in Edgartown, MA. Photo shows the airfield on the left and Katama Farm on the right. South Beach is at the bottom of the photo. The road running vertically in the center of the photo is Mattakesett Way, separating the airfield on the left and Katama Farm on the right. The large structure bisected by a strut between the upper and lower wing of the airplane is the Winnetu Resort .

- Katama Airpark is a public airport owned by the Town of Edgartown, Massachusetts. It has three unpaved runways, averages 22 flights per day, and has approximately four aircraft based on its field. During World War II, Martha's Vineyard functioned as an outer defense and a training facility for gunnery and pilots.
- Katama General Store is located on Katama Road, a short walk from the historic downtown village of Edgartown, just before the fork in the road on the way to South Beach in Katama. "KatGen" or "KGS", as it is known to its customers, is a popular stop on the way to and from the beach.
- Winnetu Oceanside Resort is known as the successor to the historic Mattakesett Lodge and the later Mattakesett Resort. The resort, situated on over 55 acres of land along South Beach, is styled after the grand summer resorts of the Mattakesett's era. Winnetu is also home to The Dunes restaurant, which is a successor to a popular mid-20th century dining room on the same site.

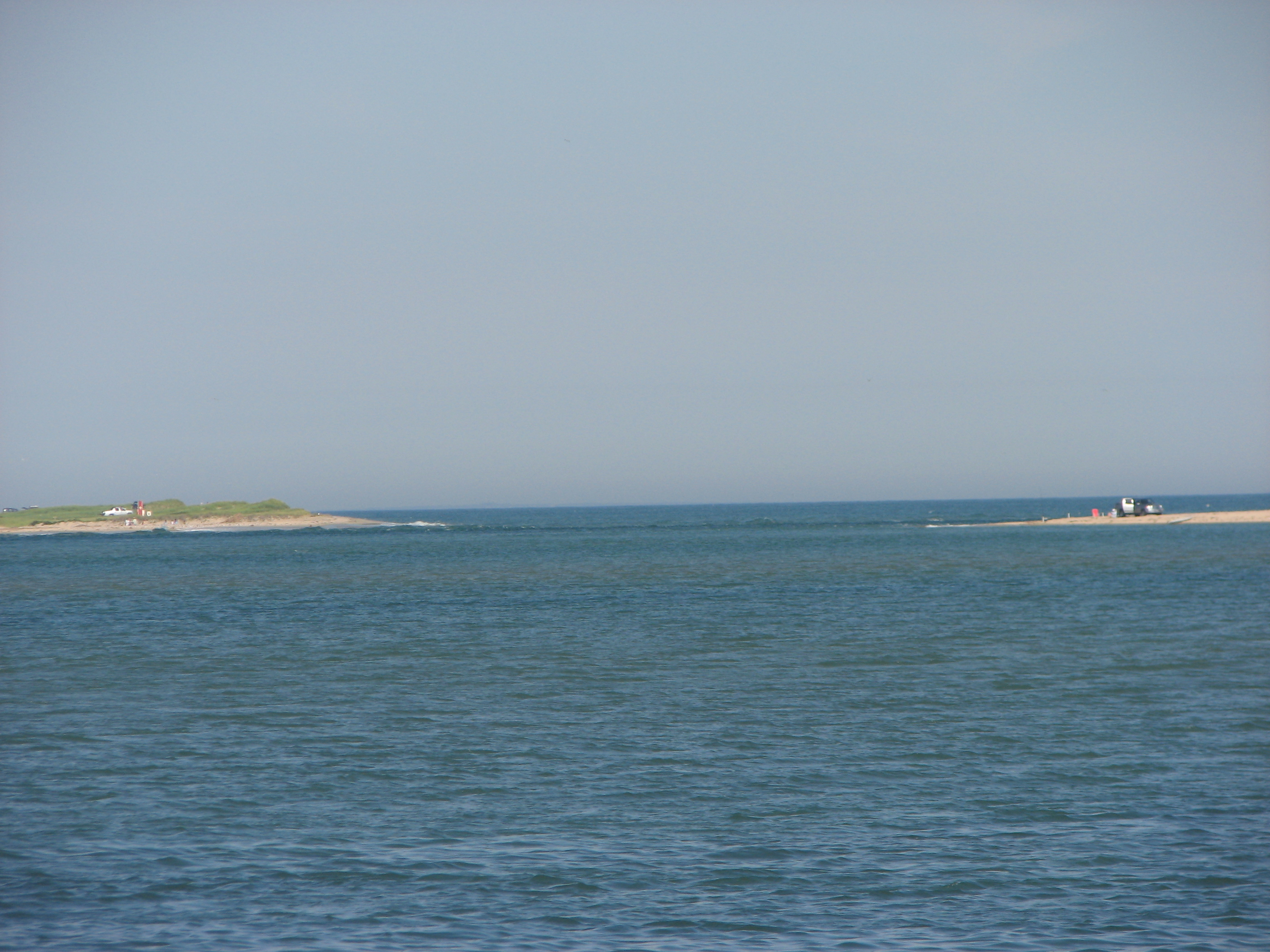
Photo of the "Katama Breach."

== See also ==
- M/V Katama, Steamship Authority freight ship named after the region.
