= Jernegan =

Jernegan is a surname. Notable people with the surname include:

- Helen Jernegan (1839–1934), American woman and wife of a whaler
- John D. Jernegan (1911–1981), American Foreign Service Officer and Ambassador Extraordinary and Plenipotentiary
- Marcus Jernegan (1872–1949), American historian and a professor at the University of Chicago
