= Manuel F. Correllus State Forest =

Protected area in Massachusetts, United States

- Location within Massachusetts Location within the United States
- Location: Edgartown and West Tisbury, Massachusetts, United States
- Coordinates: 41°24′03″N 70°34′53″W
- Area: 5,215 acres (2,110 ha)
- Elevation: 52 ft (16 m)
- Established: 1908
- Named for: Original forest manager Manny Correllus
- Administrator: Massachusetts Department of Conservation and Recreation
- Website: Official website

Manuel F. Correllus State Forest is a Massachusetts state forest located on Martha's Vineyard. The forest borders Martha's Vineyard Airport on three sides and is chiefly in the towns of West Tisbury and Edgartown. The forest is managed by the Department of Conservation and Recreation.

== Description ==
Correllus State Forest is a 5,100-acre (2,100 ha) forest principally used for biking and hiking.

Situated in the center of Martha's Vineyard, the park is the focus of one of the largest environmental restoration projects in the country as the DCR is working to bring back the park's native ecosystem.

The park lies within the Atlantic coastal pine barrens ecoregion. Landscapes within the park include grasslands, heathlands, pine barrens, and woodlands. Oak and pine are the dominant trees within the park. Many rare species may also be located here.

== History ==
Created in 1908 as the Heath Hen Reserve, the original purpose of the reservation was to prevent the extinction of the heath hen, a type of grouse that lived in the pine barrens of New England. Unfortunately, by late 1938 the last heath hen had disappeared from the forest and the species was officially classified as extinct. The forest later took the name of the superintendent who ran it from 1948 to 1987.

Despite widespread land clearing for farming and other purposes across Martha's Vineyard throughout its history, much of the area within Correllus State Forest did not suffer this fate. However, due to forest fires and other natural processes, the forest is not considered old-growth.

During World War II, Naval Auxiliary Air Facility Martha's Vineyard (operational today as Martha's Vineyard Airport) was established within the confines of the forest as part of a donation from the state to the United States Navy.

Frequent fires have been a problem in the Correllus State Forest. Between 1867 and 1929 there were sixteen fires of more than 1,000 acres (400 ha) each on Martha's Vineyard. In 2003, the DCR, in conjunction with the University of Massachusetts began evaluating methods for controlling fuel sources in the Pitch Pine and Scrub Oak areas. Methods included thinning of pitch pine stands, mowing of shrub understories, and grazing of regrowth by sheep. In 2008, about 110 acres (45 ha) of dead red pine were removed to reduce fuel loading and to restore pitch pine–scrub oak sand plain through USDA Forest Service funding.

== Activities and amenities ==
The forest offers 14 miles (23 km) of trails for hiking, bicycling, horseback riding, and cross-country-skiing. Restricted hunting is also available.
