= Marcus Jernegan =

American historian

Marcus Wilson Jernegan (1872–1949) was an American historian and a professor at the University of Chicago. In 2017, a scholar from Harvard (Donald Yacovone) referred to him as one of the leading historians of his time who influenced textbooks of his era and noted the tainted and bigoted sources he relied on, as well as his assertions that violence ascribed to the white supremacist hate group Ku Klux Klan violence was "largely fabricated".

== Biography ==
Jernegan was from Edgartown, Massachusetts, son of ship captain Jared Jernegan and his second wife, Helen Jernegan. He graduated as valedictorian of Edgartown High School, then received his PhD from the University of Chicago in 1906. His father was a whaler and his brother, Prescott Jernegan, became infamous as the promoter of the fraudulent Jernegan Process for extracting gold from seawater, used to defraud investors in Lubec, Maine.

Jernegan was part of a pioneering effort to map colonial churches. He wrote about slavery and conversion to Christianity in the United States. He also wrote about the veracity of Benjamin Franklin's supposed kite experiments to demonstrate electricity.

Jernegan collected specimens of algae.

== Legacy ==
A collection of essays written by his students was published as a historiography in 1937.

== Selected publications ==
- The American Colonies — 1492 to 1750
- A Child’s Diary Aboard a Whale-ship (edited version of his sister's diaries)
- The History of the Whaling Industry
