= Trade Wind Airport =

- IATA: none; ICAO: none; FAA LID: MA44

Summary
- Airport type: Private; Public Use
- Owner: Martha's Vineyard Land Bank Commission
- Operator: Martha's Vineyard Land Bank Commission
- Location: Oak Bluffs, Massachusetts
- Built: Unknown
- In use: 1938-present
- Elevation AMSL: 43 ft / 13 m
- Coordinates: 41°26′27.70″N 70°34′9.83″W
- Website: http://www.mvlandbank.com/18trade_wind.shtml

Map
- Interactive map of Trade Wind Airport

Runways
Direction	Length		Surface
Direction	ft	m	Surface
6/24	2,200	671	Turf

Statistics (2020)
- Based aircraft: 0

Trade Wind Airport (FAA LID: MA44) is an airfield in Oak Bluffs, Massachusetts, located in Dukes County on the Island of Martha's Vineyard.

The airfield has been in operation since at least 1938. It has two turf runways, numbered 6/24 and 13/31. Only runway 6/24 is currently in use. There is a hangar on the property, but there are currently no fueling or hangar facilities available. No overnight parking of planes is allowed, so planes must leave the same day. Aircraft wishing to park overnight use one of the other two airports on the island, Martha's Vineyard Airport or Katama Airpark.

The airport is on 71.9 acres of land known as the Trade Wind Fields Preserve and is owned and operated by the Martha's Vineyard Land Bank Commission.

The airport is privately owned, for public use. Landing is allowed only after receiving a permission-to-land email from the Land Bank. Pilots request permission in advance using a form on the Land Bank's website. Permission-to-land emails are valid until December 31 and must be renewed annually.

== See also ==
- List of airports in Massachusetts
