= Helen Jernegan =

- Jernegan, circa 1861
- Born: Hellen Meriah Clark; September 8, 1839; Gorham, Cumberland County, Maine
- Died: February 26, 1934 (aged 94); Edgartown, Martha's Vineyard, Massachusetts
- Other names: Helen Clark Jernegan, Helen McLellan Clark Jernegan
- Occupations: teacher, whaler, adventurer
- Years active: 1859–1871
- Spouse: Jared Jernegan
- Children: Laura Jernegan Spear, Marcus Jernegan, Prescott Jernegan

Helen Jernegan (September 8, 1839 – February 26, 1934) was an American woman and wife of a whaler. She began her career as a teacher in 1859 and then married a whaling captain. As he missed his wife, he sent for her to join him and she met him in Honolulu, Kingdom of Hawai'i. The two sailed back to New Bedford aboard the Oriole arriving in 1866. Two years later, she went aboard ship with her husband and children, and lived in Honolulu and aboard his ship the Roman until 1871. She sailed twice around Cape Horn and was possibly the first white woman on Tahuata in the Marquesas Islands. After a mutiny on their second voyage, she returned to live on Martha's Vineyard. One of the accounts was written by her young daughter, Laura Jernegan Spear.

== Early life ==
Hellen Meriah Clark was born on September 8, 1839, in Gorham, Cumberland County, Maine, to Eveline D. (née McLellan) and Aaron Clark. She was raised in Maine until the age of twelve, when she began living with her mother's sister, Charlotte (née McLellan) Coffin and her family in Edgartown, Massachusetts, on Martha's Vineyard. She attended school on the island and worked as a teacher after her graduation at North Primary School, starting in 1859. In 1861, she met the ship captain Jared Jernegan, a widower with a son, Aylmer, who had been born in 1854. Though Jared was fifteen years older than she, they married that June in Maine.

== Adventuring ==
Within a year of the marriage, in June 1862, Jared set sail for the Sandwich Islands, as Hawaii was known at the time. Within weeks of his leaving, Jernegan gave birth to their first child, Laura on June 29, 1862. Missing his family, Jared wrote asking Jernegan to meet him in Honolulu to make the return voyage with him. She left their daughter with her Aunt Pierce took a train to New York and boarded a steamship in September 1865. After an eight-day sea journey, she arrived in Aspinwall, Panama and boarded a train to take the fifty mile journey to Panama City. Boarding another steamer, Jernegan sailed for ten days to reach San Francisco, where she was delayed two weeks awaiting passage to Honolulu. When she arrived in Honolulu, the couple spent a month there before starting the return voyage.

Sailing aboard the Oriole for Aitutaki in the Cook Islands, they made their way back to New Bedford, Massachusetts, after passing Cape Horn, arriving in September 1866. Three months later, on December 17, 1866, the couple's second child, Prescott Ford Jernegan was born. Jared had earned enough from the trip aboard the Oriole to support the family for the next two years, but in 1868, he decided to take command of the Roman and sail with the entire family. Jernegan spent her days aboard ship watching the children and piecing by hand a log cabin quilt, which would contain 2,310 strips of fabric. While on board the ship, Jared chalked out an area for the children to run freely but be away from the men working with the whales. He also made a schoolhouse on deck for Jernegan to give lessons to Laura. To practice her writing, Jernegan had Laura keep a diary of the trip. They sailed around Cape Horn and made landfall on the Juan Fernández Islands. From there, they proceeded to Cecorius Island where they met Jared's brother Nathan to exchange news and trade salt. On March 29, 1869, the Roman made landfall at Honolulu and Jernegan and the children disembarked. They lived in a rented cottage on Fort Street while Jared continued north to the Arctic.

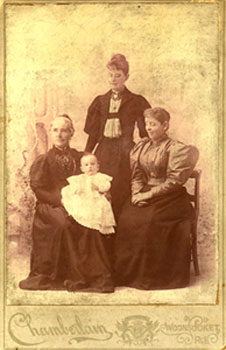
Helen Clark Jernegan, her daughter Laura, her grandson Carleton and her mother Eveline D Clark

By October, Jared had returned and unwilling to be separated longer from his family, they joined him aboard ship when he sailed in November to hunt whales near the equator. The family spent five months at sea making stops at Ohitahoo, where Jernegan was reported to have been the first white woman to land on that Marquesas Island and Nuku Hiva. They spent eight days on Ohitahoo and the children encountered bananas, breadfruit, coconuts, guavas, lemons, limes, mamey apples, oranges, pineapples and plantains, writing home about the variety of fruit. By March 1870, they were back in Honolulu, where they rented another small cottage on Fort Street. All the meals for the family were purchased from the Chinese proprietor of a nearby hotel and Prescott had a native woman who served as his nanny. Jernegan reported watching native surfers ride the waves, while Jared returned to the Arctic for the season.

Returned from the north by December, once again Jared took the family aboard and made for the equator by way of Maria Island (also known as the Peru atoll) in the between season of 1870. Soon, they struck a reef, but emerged unscathed. Returning to Ohitahoo, they anchored in Resolution Bay with the intent of restocking supplies and repairing some rot on the topsail. As they were preparing to sail back to Honolulu, seventeen crewmen, who had gone ashore and returned drunk, mutinied. The second mate and second officer were badly injured. Jared, armed with his Henry rifle, locked Jernegan and the children in the stateroom and took up a position in the saloon. Soon the mutineers lowered three whaleboats and left the whaler under threat that they would return and burn it. During the mutiny, the fourth mate and his party were en route to the Roman and arrived in time to release the second mate and Jared. Though only nine sailors remained on board, Jared slipped anchor and put to sea. Arriving in Honolulu in March 1871, Jared returned to the Arctic, but sent Jernegan and the children back to Edgartown by way of San Francisco. Jared's ship was lost on the voyage, but he returned to join his family in Edgartown, where the couple's youngest child, Marcus Jernegan, was born in 1872.

Jernigan did not return to sea, though Jared completed seven more whaling voyages before he retired in 1888. After his death in 1899, Jernigan lived with her son Marcus until 1900, but thereafter supported herself from her own income.

== Death and legacy ==
Jernigan died on February 26, 1934, in Edgartown. In 1954, the NBC Radio program Inheritance featured an episode, "The Whale Hunters" which was narrated by George Lefferts about the Jernigan family voyage of 1870–1871.
