= Martha's Vineyard Airport =

Civilian airport in Dukes County, Massachusetts, United States

Marthas Vineyard Airport

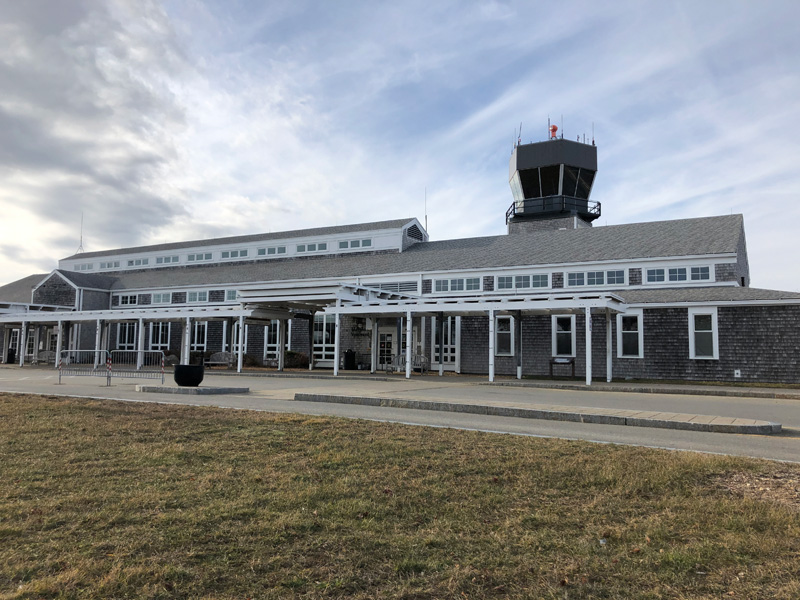
- Terminal
- IATA: MVY; ICAO: KMVY; FAA LID: MVY

Summary
- Airport type: Public
- Owner: Dukes County
- Operator: Martha's Vineyard Airport Commission
- Serves: Martha's Vineyard
- Location: Vineyard Haven, Massachusetts, U.S.
- Opened: May 27, 1946; 80 years ago
- Operating base for: Cape Air; Nantucket Airlines
- Built: March 26, 1943; 83 years ago
- Elevation AMSL: 67 ft (20 m)
- Coordinates: 41°23′35″N 070°36′52″W
- Website: www.mvyairport.com

Maps
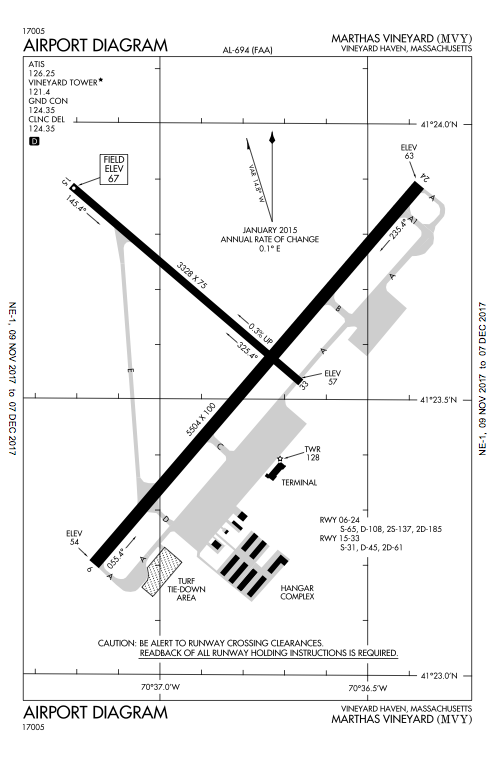
- FAA airport diagram
- Interactive map of Marthas Vineyard Airport

Runways
Direction	Length		Surface
Direction	ft	m	Surface
6/24	5,504	1,678	Asphalt
15/33	3,328	1,014	Asphalt

Statistics (2024)
- Aircraft operations: 40,260
- Based aircraft: 72
- Total passengers: 161,000
- Source: Federal Aviation Administration

Martha's Vineyard Airport (IATA: MVY, ICAO: KMVY, FAA LID: MVY) is a public airport located in the middle of the island of Martha's Vineyard, 3 mi (4.8 km) south of the central business district of Vineyard Haven, in Dukes County, Massachusetts, United States. This airport is owned by Dukes County and lies on the border between the towns of West Tisbury and Edgartown.

It is the largest of three airports and the only one on the island served by airlines. In addition to service from six commercial airlines, it is used by a significant number of general aviation aircraft. The other airports on the Island are Katama Airpark and Trade Wind Airport.

== Terminal and facilities ==
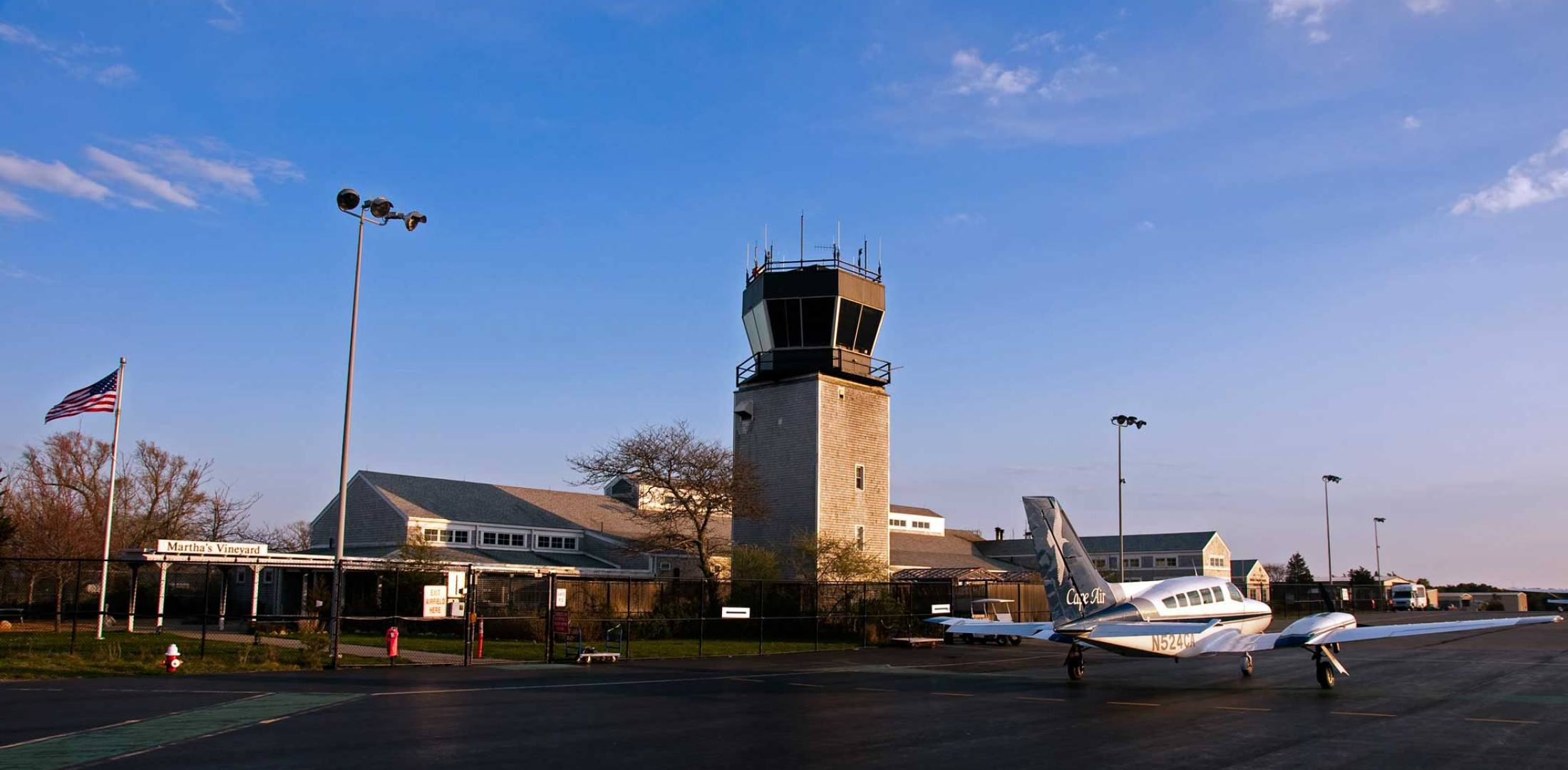
Cape Air plane at Martha's Vineyard Airport ramp in 2001

Martha's Vineyard Airport covers an area of 688 acres (278 ha) and has two asphalt runways:

- Runway 6/24: 5,504 x 100 ft (1,678 x 30 m), ILS/DME equipped, with approved GPS approaches
- Runway 15/33: 3,297 x 75 ft (1,005 x 23 m), has approved GPS approaches.

For the 12-month period ending March 31, 2017, the airport had 40,555 aircraft operations, an average of 111 per day: 53% general aviation, 43% air taxi, 3% commercial, and <1% military. In November 2017, there were 72 aircraft based at this airport: 59 single engine, 12 multi-engine, and 1 helicopter. The terminal has a restaurant, passenger holding areas, check-in desks, and a small luggage claim. The ramp has the ability to hold up to 50 aircraft with about 15 spots reserved for commercial aviation.

The airport apron for commercial aircraft has one parking stand which has the capacity for seven Cessna 402 or Tecnam P2012 aircraft, mainly operated by Cape Air and Nantucket Airlines. There are also five larger parking stands for JetBlue Embraer 190 or A220-300 aircraft, American Eagle Airlines CRJ-200/CRJ-700/CRJ-900, Embraer 175 regional jets, and American Airbus A319, Delta Connection CRJ-200/CRJ-700/CRJ-900, Embraer 175 regional jets, and Delta Airbus A319, and Elite Airways CRJ-200/CRJ-700/CRJ-900.

During the summer, a seasonal tent is added to the airport where all TSA checked passengers will wait for flights, as the terminal does not have a permanent waiting area. The tent has two gates for all airlines and can seat up to 150 people. A small baggage claim is located on the left of the terminal, which is used for Cape Air year-round and JetBlue during summer months; other airlines have baggage located at the side of the aircraft due to the small capacity of the baggage claim.

== Operations ==
Along with the TSA, the West Tisbury Police Department is in charge of the security of the airport, and the ARFF department is staffed by 10 full-time firefighters. The airport currently operates several fully functional emergency response vehicles.

== History ==
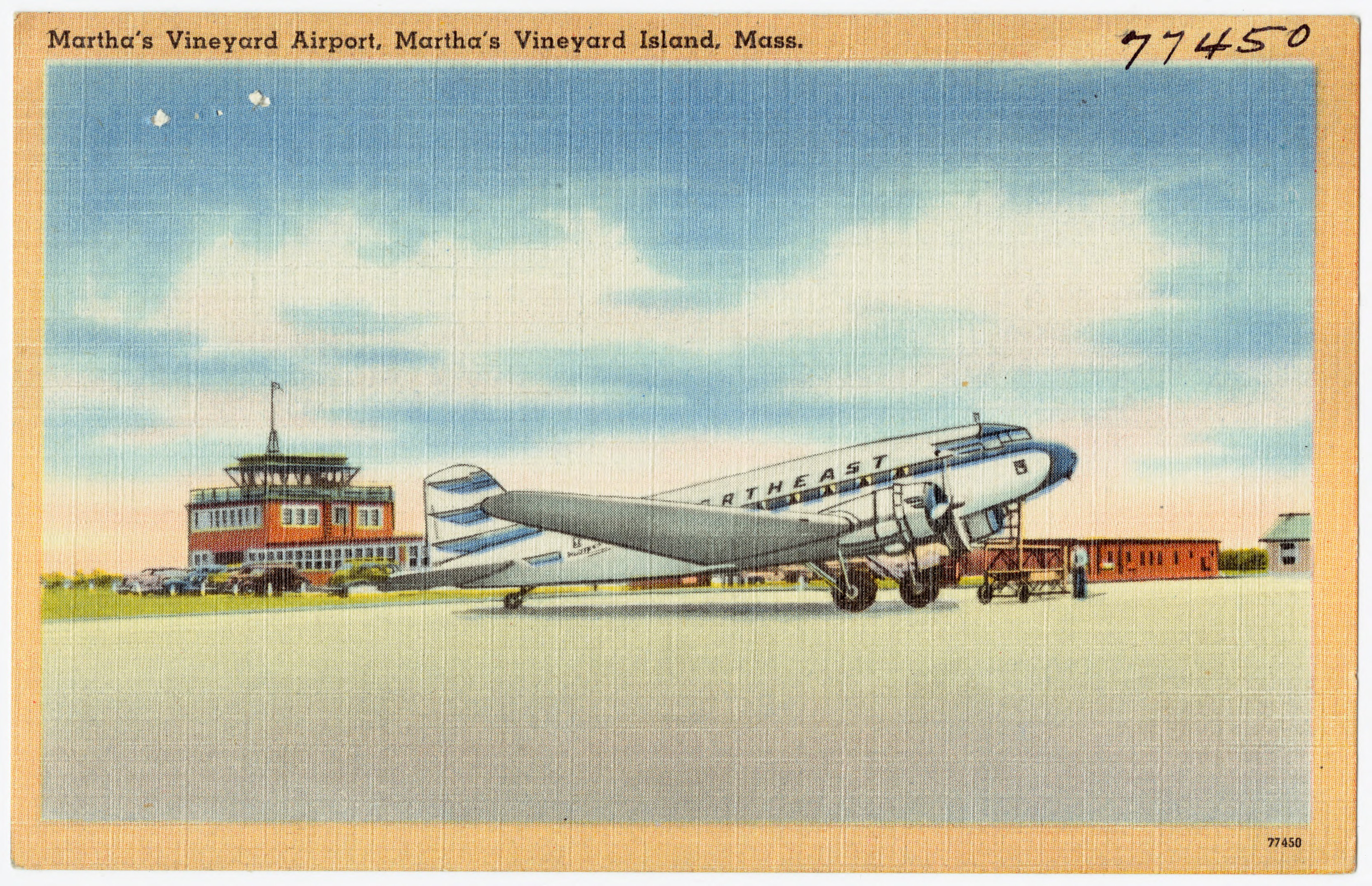
Postcard image c. 1940s, showing a Northeast DC-3

The airfield was built in 1942 as Naval Auxiliary Air Facility Martha's Vineyard (NAAF Martha's Vineyard) to support the training of naval aviators before their deployment to aircraft carriers in the Pacific Theater. Thousands of men received six weeks of intensive training there. The installation was renamed "Naval Auxiliary Air Station Martha's Vineyard" in 1945, placed in caretaker status in 1946, and ultimately transferred to Dukes County in 1959.

The new terminal building, constructed in 2001, replaced an older wooden structure that was the original base operations building. Historical photos and memorabilia are mounted on the main hall's western wall near the restaurant entrance, and tell the story of the Navy squadrons posted there during the war.

Major construction was made in the airport during the 21st century. One major project was to shift 200 ft of runway 6 - 24 and renovate taxiways to allow jets such as ERJ-190 and CRJ-200 to operate at the airport. The airport also renovated their commercial ramp, adding one spot for JetBlue ERJ-190, and Delta Air Lines ERJ-145 and CRJ-200. They also renovated taxiways; they added a tent on the terminal as they do not have a terminal building prepared for their demand.

Over the years, American Airlines stopped using their Bombardier CRJ series to Martha's Vineyard because of demand, and started using their Embraer E175 operated by Republic Airways as American Eagle. The airport renovated its ramp again in 2018, adding five spots jets to Airbus A220. In 2020 Delta Air Lines switched using their Bombardier CRJ series to Embraer E175 operated by Republic Airways as Delta Connection.

In 2017 a new firefighter department building was built next to the terminal building, replacing the old naval building.

The airport also renovated and reconstructed its main runway 6 - 24 in 2018–2019; the project cost around $10 million, including adding NO TAXI islands around the ramp. The runway was done and reopened in May 2019 with a Cape Air flight from Boston Logan to be the first aircraft to touch the new runway. In 2020 the airport repaved some areas on the ramp and added more markings.

During the COVID-19 pandemic, the airport saw a dramatic decline in passengers, with only 15,000 people passing through their doors. American and Delta Air Lines resumed service in late June with their schedules operating by half of 2019. JetBlue resumed service back in July, but only with a concise schedule. This was the most challenging year for the airport, but demand increased in late 2020 and early 2021.

2021 was the busiest year thus far for the airport, as it had 65,992 passengers.

In 2022, Elite Airways pulled out of Martha's Vineyard and left the airport with a space for a new airline, which still no airlines have any interest in. In January American Airlines announced that it would begin seasonal service between the island and Chicago; later, they changed their summer schedule and added more flights to Washington D.C. In March 2022 Delta Air Lines announced they would make twice-daily departures to John F. Kennedy International Airport and one daily departure to LaGuardia Airport.

Later, JetBlue reduced their summer schedule to the island to about 15% due to pilot shortage, which postponed their Newark route to resume after Labor Day and cut some flights to John F. Kennedy International Airport. As a result, JetBlue was scheduled to only operate five times daily during the 2022 summer season.

The 2022 summer season at MVY was the busiest regarding the number of passengers. Delta Air Lines increased their schedule to operate four times daily on the 76 seats ERJ-175; they also extended their season until October 10 from flights to LaGuardia Airport. All other airlines were operating at the same schedule level as 2021 except for American Airlines, which increased their frequency to DCA airport up to fifteen times weekly and added a Saturday service to Chicago.

2023 was the airport's busiest year in history; the airport had an average of 80,000 passengers at the airport. Even though the airport had fewer planes coming to it, all commercial flights were at total capacity daily. The airport administration team said that the airport probably will not see the number of passengers increase due to the small terminal and its facility.

In 2024, JetBlue discontinued their flights to White Plains due to low demand. In the 2023 season, there were 7,200 passengers to White Plains. Tradewind Aviation will be the only airline to serve this destination. Also in 2024, American Airlines announced that they will return flights to LaGuardia Airport daily from June to September. JetBlue will also now serve daily flights to Washington–National, increasing capacity from the 2023 season, which used to operate only Fridays - Sundays.

Still, the airport has space for one more airline since Elite Airways left the airport market in 2022. The community of Martha's Vineyard hopes that either United Airlines or Breeze Airways will fill the cap and introduce flights to White Plains and Newark, which would increase MVY market to NYC City.

=== Expansion ===
In 2021, the airport created a Capital Improvement Plan that cites the airport's significant problems during the peak summer months. The airport plans to renovate taxiways and the southeast and southwest ramps with new parking for aircraft. The airport is also considering expanding those ramps to accommodate more general aviation aircraft. In addition, the airport is working to become 95% carbon-free in the future, adding electric chargers for the new Cape Air Eviation Alice aircraft.

The airport will create new hangars for aircraft maintenance and expand its terminal to accommodate the high summer demand.

=== Terminal ===
Martha's Vineyard Airport Terminal has one of the most miniature terminals in Massachusetts, and it contains two gates, a restaurant, a ticket area, bathrooms, and baggage claim. During the summer months, the secure room is an outdoor tent where all secure passengers wait for flights. The TSA at MVY only contains one area to screen all passengers simultaneously. The ticket area contains about 12: two for JetBlue, two for Delta Air Lines, two for American Airlines, four for Cape Air, and two for any future airlines. The baggage claim is on the terminal's right side, near the car rental area. The restaurant and the management building are located on the left side of the terminal. The restaurant is located before the TSA, so there is no place for food after the TSA screening. Part of the building has pictures and airplane models of the airport in WWII.

== Airlines and destinations ==
Airlines	Destinations	Refs
American Eagle	Seasonal: Charlotte, Chicago–O'Hare, New York–LaGuardia, Philadelphia, Washington–National	
Cape Air	Boston, Hyannis, Nantucket, New Bedford; Seasonal: New York–JFK, White Plains	
Delta Connection	Seasonal: New York–JFK, New York–LaGuardia	
JetBlue	Seasonal: Boston, New York–JFK, Washington–National	
Nantucket Airlines	Hyannis, Nantucket	
Reliant Air	Seasonal charter: Danbury	
Tradewind Aviation	Charter: White Plains; Seasonal charter: Teterboro	

American Eagle operates seasonally from June till September using their E175; American Eagle can operate up to 7x a day out of MVY.

Cape Air/Nantucket Airlines operates the Cessna 402 and Tecnam P2012. They operate year-round, with some days operating 40 times a day at the airport in the summer season and others operating 15 to 25 times a day in the winter.

Delta Connection operates E175/E170 regional jets to both New York–Kennedy and New York–LaGuardia. They operate seasonally from around Memorial Day until late October.

JetBlue operates the A220-300 to Martha's Vineyard; JetBlue can operate up to 6x daily on peak season and 4x daily during the off-season.

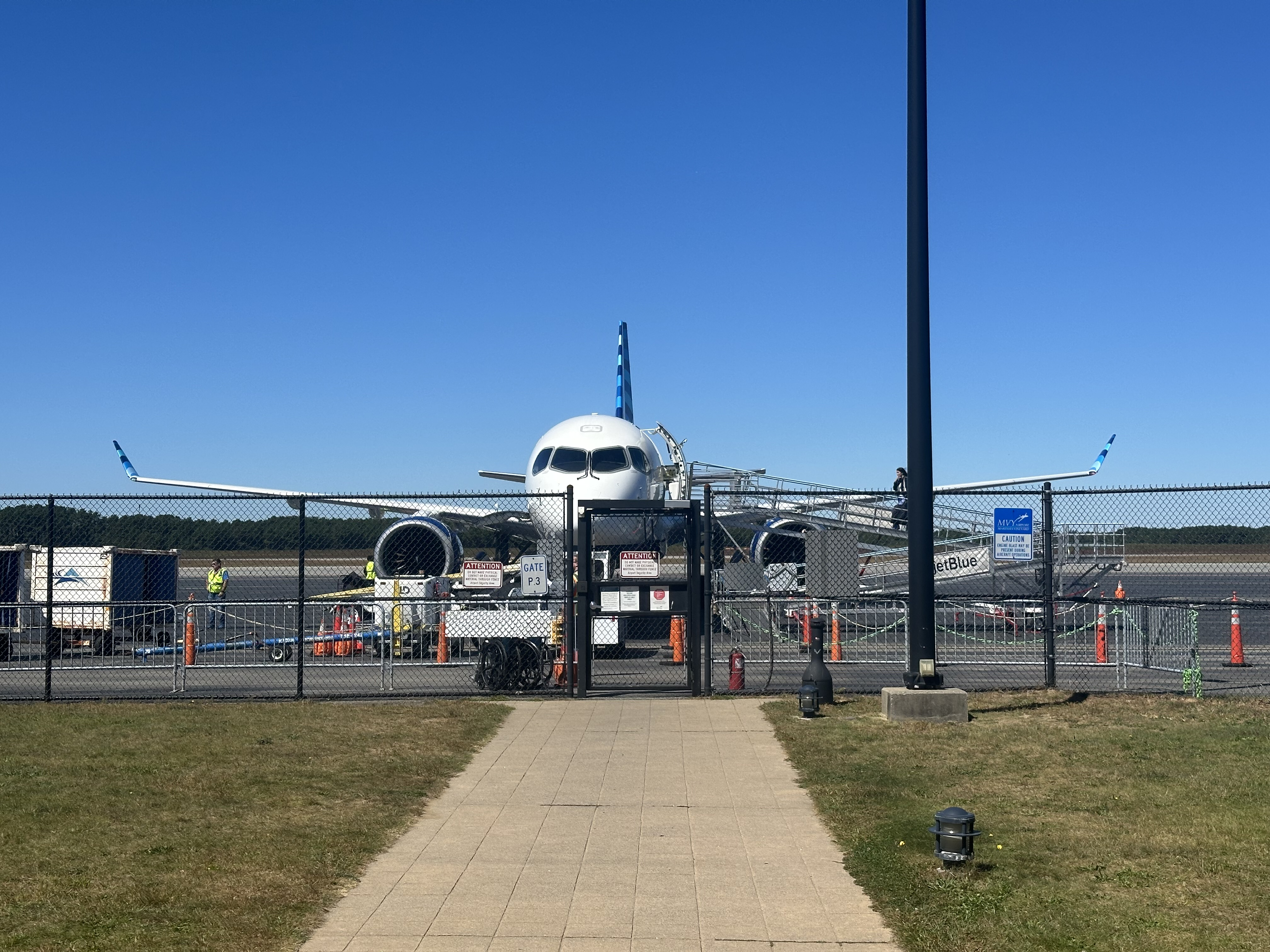
JetBlue A220-300 at MVY Gate 1

Tradewind Aviation operates the PC-12 into Martha's Vineyard. They operate 15 times a day in summer and five times or more during winter.

Domestic destinations map
All domestic destinations from Martha's Vineyard Airport (MVY)

• Red represents year-round destinations.
• Green represents seasonal destinations.
• Blue represents future destinations.

• Pink represents destinations to which service is being terminated.

=== Cargo ===
Airlines	Destinations	Refs
Cape Air	Boston, Hyannis; Seasonal: New Bedford	
FedEx Feeder	Providence	

FedEx Feeder offers a year-round flight from Providence, during summer months cargo flight can go up to 5 times a day and one time a day in the winter, all cargo continue to their FedEx facility at the airport and then into their trucks for delivery.

Cape Air offers cargo flights to Boston and Hyannis year-round and adds seasonal cargo flight to New Bedford. Cape Air cargo is dropped off in terminal C on Cape Air ticker area in Boston or in the main terminal ticket area in MVY for Cape Air.

=== Historical airline service ===
Northeast Airlines served Martha's Vineyard beginning in August 1944, when it acquired Mayflower Airlines. By the 1950s it was the dominant airline at the airport. Air New England served MVY from the 1970s until 1981; Provincetown-Boston Airline (PBA), operating as a feeder for Eastern Airlines, served MVY in the 1980s. Bridgeport-based Atlantic Air served MVY in the mid-1980s before merging into Business Express Airlines, which continued service to MVY under the Delta Connection brand. Other historical carriers at MVY included Bar Harbor Airlines, Brockway Air, Catskill Airways, Edgartown Air, Executive Airlines, Express Air, Gull Air, Holiday Airlines, Island Airlines, New Haven Airlines, New York Air, NorEast, Northern Airlines, Spectrum Airlines and Trans East Airlines.

== Statistics ==
=== Top destinations ===
Busiest domestic routes from MVY (September 2025 – August 2026)
Rank	Airport	Passengers	Carriers
1	(Washington, D.C.) Washington–National, D.C.	18,030	American Eagle, JetBlue
2	Boston, Massachusetts	17,800	Cape Air, JetBlue
3	(New York (state)) New York–LaGuardia, New York	17,410	American Eagle, Delta Connection
4	(New York (state)) New York–JFK, New York	17,110	Cape Air, Delta Connection, JetBlue
5	Philadelphia, Pennsylvania	6,630	American Eagle
6	(New York (state)) White Plains, New York	2,590	Cape Air, Tradewind
7	Nantucket, Massachusetts	1,150	Cape Air, Nantucket Airlines
8	Charlotte, North Carolina	690	American Eagle
9	Chicago–O'Hare, Illinois	690	American Eagle
10	Hyannis, Massachusetts	340	Cape Air

=== Airline market share ===
Largest airlines at MVY (August 2025 – July 2026)
Rank	Airline	Passengers	Share
1	Republic Airways (American Eagle, Delta Connection)	82,750	50.15%
2	JetBlue	44,530	26.99%
3	Nantucket Airlines (Cape Air)	31,830	19.29%
4	Tradewind	4,540	2.75%
5	Envoy Air	1,360	0.83%

=== Annual traffic ===
Annual traffic
	Passengers	Change from previous year	Aircraft operations	Total cargo (freight, express, & mail) (lbs.)
2000	71,150	▼71.3%	0	0
2001	65,374	▼1.08%	0	0
2002	59,500	▼1.09%	0	0
2003	53,011	▼1.12%	0	0
2004	53,011	▼0.00%	0	0
2005	48,977	▼1.08%	0	0
2006	45,881	▼1.06%	0	0
2007	49,205	▲0.93%	0	0
2008	45,002	▼1.9%	0	0
2009	42,248	▼1.6%	0	0
2010	43,904	▲0.96%	0	0
2011	49,095	▲0.89%	0	0
2012	50,484	▼0.97%	0	0
2013	56,313	▲0.96%	0	0
2014	52,362	▼7.4%	0	0
2015	49,853	▼4.79%	0	0
2016	54,084	▲8.4%	0	0
2017	49,767	▼7.9%	0	0
2018	52,605	▲5.7%	0	0
2019	52,792	▲59.1%	0	0
2020	18,462	▼65.0%	0	0
2021	67,789	▲267.1%	0	0
2022	70,098	▲3.40%	4,616	678,000
2023	81,283	▲15.95%	4,630	585,000
2024	81,666	▲0.47%	0	0

== Accidents and incidents ==
- On July 16, 1999, a Piper PA-32R-301 Saratoga II HP piloted by John F. Kennedy Jr. crashed into the Atlantic Ocean approximately 7.5 miles (12.1 km) southwest of the airport while on approach for landing. All three occupants, including Kennedy's wife Carolyn Bessette-Kennedy and sister-in-law Lauren Bessette, were killed. The National Transportation Safety Board (NTSB) determined the probable cause was the pilot's failure to maintain control of the airplane during a descent over water at night, which was a result of spatial disorientation.
- On January 30, 2001, a Cape Air pilot and his only passenger were injured when a Cessna 402C crashed just short of the Martha's Vineyard Airport on a flight from T. F. Green Airport in Warwick, Rhode Island.
- On September 26, 2008, a repositioning flight with no passengers on board departed Martha's Vineyard at 8:05 pm en route to Boston. Shortly after takeoff from runway 33, the plane went down about two and a half miles from the airport, killing the pilot, who was the sole occupant. Prior to this date, Cape Air had maintained a fatality-free record over its 18-year history.

== See also ==
- List of airports in Massachusetts
