= Edgartown, Massachusetts =

Town in Massachusetts, United States

Edgartown
- Town
- Town of Edgartown
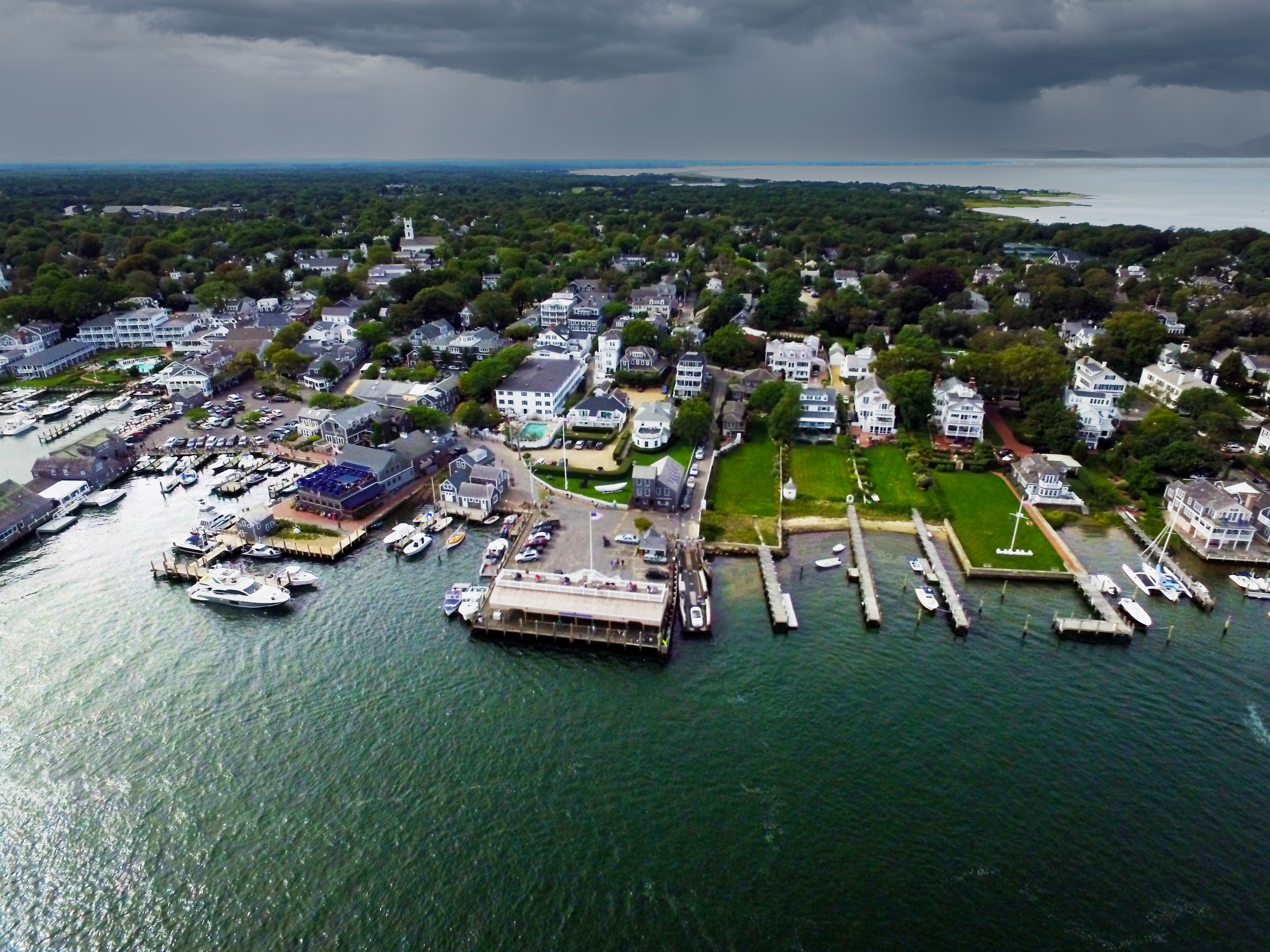
- Edgartown Harbor, with the Edgartown Memorial Wharf (center)

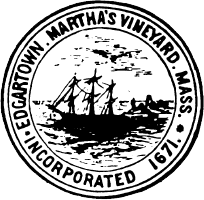
- Seal

- Location in Dukes County in Massachusetts

- Location of Edgartown in Massachusetts Location of Edgartown in the USA
- Coordinates: 41°23′20″N 70°30′50″W
- Country: United States
- State: Massachusetts
- County: Dukes
- Settled: 1642
- Incorporated: July 8, 1671

Government
  - Type: Open town meeting
  - Town Administrator: James Hagerty

Area
  - Total: 122.7 sq mi (317.9 km^{2})
  - Land: 27.0 sq mi (69.9 km^{2})
  - Water: 95.8 sq mi (248.0 km^{2})
- Elevation: 16 ft (5 m)

Population (2020)
  - Total: 5,168
  - Density: 191/sq mi (73.9/km^{2})
- Time zone: UTC−5 (Eastern)
  - Summer (DST): UTC−4 (Eastern)
- ZIP Code: 02539
- Area code: 508/774
- FIPS code: 25-21150
- GNIS feature ID: 0619441
- Website: www.edgartown-ma.us

Edgartown is a town on Martha's Vineyard in Massachusetts, for which it is the county seat. The town's population was 5,168 at the 2020 census. It contains the census-designated place of the same name.

It was once a major whaling port, with historic houses that have been carefully preserved. Today it hosts yachting events around its large harbor. Edgartown also includes Chappaquiddick Island, a peninsula accessible by ferry.

== History ==
In 1642, Rev. Thomas Mayhew, Jr. led a group of families to start a colony on the island after its purchase by his father Thomas Mayhew. Originally called Great Harbor, it was incorporated on July 8, 1671, as Edgar Towne, named for Edgar, whose father James II of England, was heir presumptive to the English throne. Those who chose the name to honor the monarchy did not know Edgar had died at the age of three on June 8, 1671. It was one of the two original towns on Martha's Vineyard, along with Tisbury, incorporated at the same time.

The younger Mayhew began his work which led to his becoming the first church planting Protestant missionary after he settled in Edgartown. A Wampanoag Indian named Hiacoomes who lived nearby became his partner in founding the churches in the Indian communities.

Edgartown was one of the primary ports for the whaling industry during the 1800s. Ships from all over the world would dock in its sheltered bay and captains would build grand mansions for their families with ornate top floor rooms called widow's walks, which overlooked the harbor. A myth developed that wives would watch for months from these tiny rooms, hoping to see the sails of ships that would bring their husbands home from the sea. There is little or no evidence that widow's walks were intended or regularly used for this purpose. They were frequently built around the chimney of the residence, thus creating an easy access route to the structure, allowing the residents of the home to pour sand down burning chimneys in the event of a chimney fire in the hopes of preventing the house from burning down.

As more economical alternatives became available the whaling industry began to decline. By the beginning of the 20th century, its influence on the tiny town which had made its fortunes through the industry, was ended. Today the town is more known for tourism, as well as the site of Chappaquiddick, where Ted Kennedy's fatal automobile accident took place in 1969.

== Tourism ==
Edgartown was an old whaling port and is now a summer and tourist destination with a multitude of houses built by whaling captains and other prominent people of prior centuries. The growth of the population over the past 25 years has led to a period of intense renewal of these old houses. Water Street along the harbor is the location of many of these "Captain's Homes" which line both sides of the street. The town has also encouraged renovation of historical structures. As part of this effort, the Whaling Church, a large 18th-century church, has been converted to a performing arts center and the adjacent Daniel Fisher House is now used for a variety of social functions. In addition to the architecture of the town, Edgartown is easily traversed on foot or bicycle, making it attractive to tourists.

Edgartown was used as the main shooting location for the town of Amity in Steven Spielberg's 1975 blockbuster Jaws. Many landmarks and buildings in Edgartown that were filmed in the movie can still be seen today.

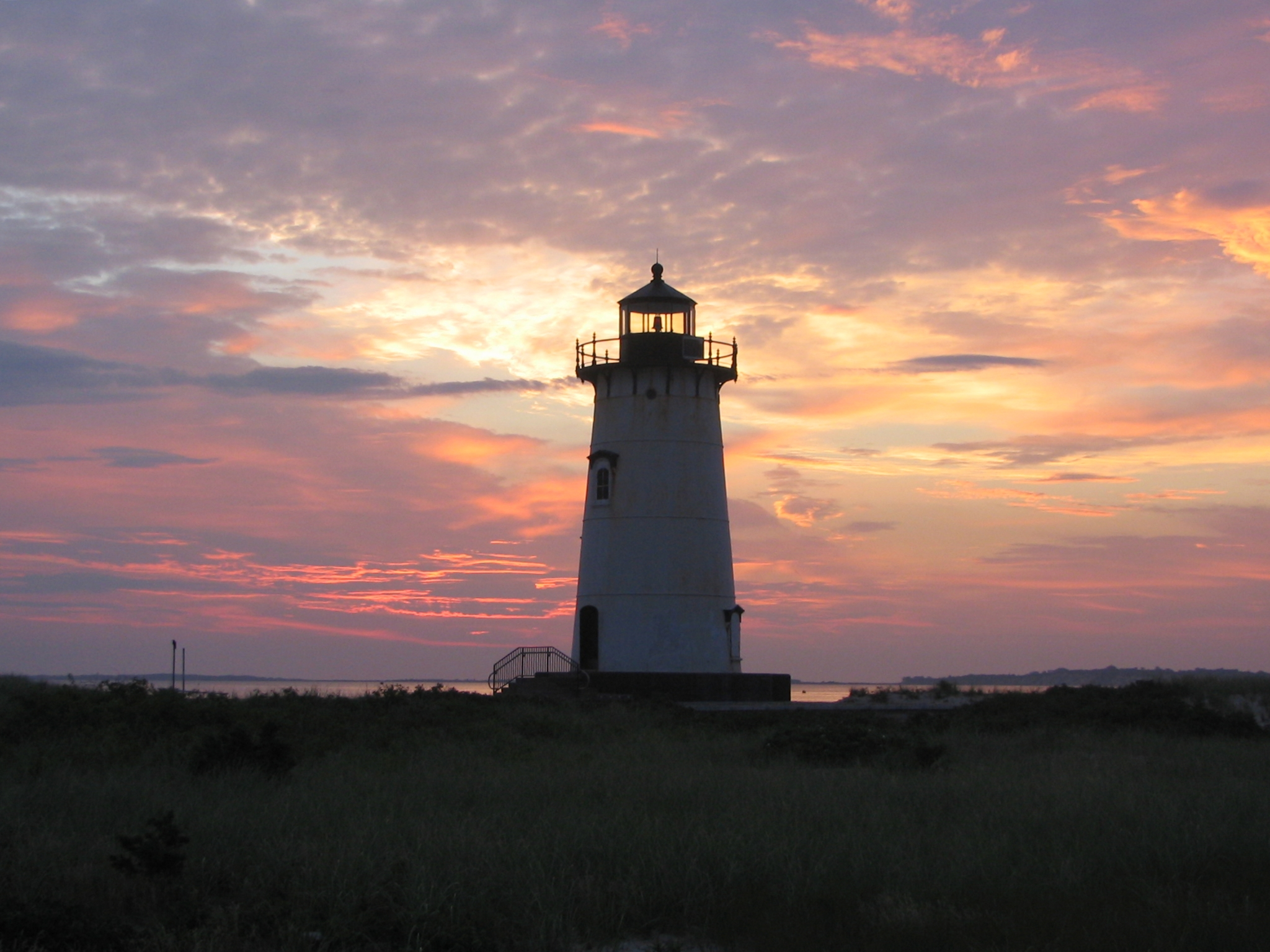
View of Edgartown Lighthouse on Martha's Vineyard at dawn. This is one of 5 lighthouses on the island. It is located at the opening of Edgartown harbor. It can be viewed by walking north on North Water street to an area adjacent to the Harborview Inn.

The Edgartown Harbor Light at the end of north Water Street defines the entrance to the harbor. The harbor is large and entered through a modest sized channel on the North side of Edgartown. It opens into Katama Bay, created by a barrier beach that sometimes connects the south end of Chappaquiddick to the remainder of Edgartown, The barrier beach opened during a spring storm in 2007. This has led to a three-knot current through Katama Bay and Edgartown Harbor. This protected body of water provides ample mooring for small and large boats. The opening of the harbor will accommodate large sailing and motorized boats, but will not accommodate large ships or yachts which may anchor outside the harbor.

Another feature is South Beach, a small part of the ocean beach that runs the entire southern length of the island from Edgartown to Aquinnah. It can be reached by driving or riding the bus south from Edgartown center for approximately 2.5 miles. South Beach is a crashing ocean beach. It is a major destination for tourists. Much of the beach in Edgartown is open to the public, with ample parking available. The section of the beach near Katama is often crowded, while the sections further to the west (near Edgartown Great Pond and Oyster Pond) are often less so.

== Geography ==
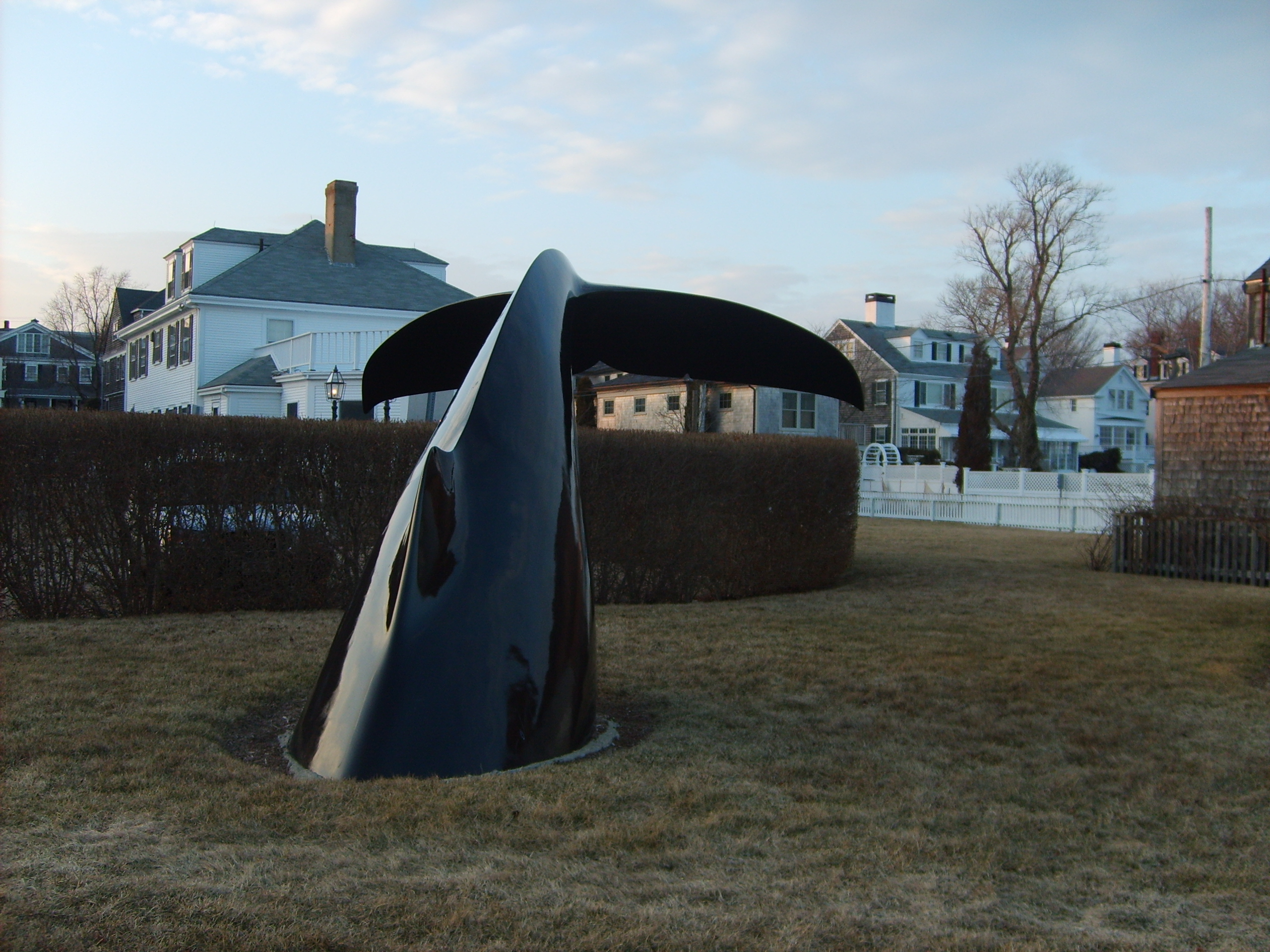
Photo of the Whale Tail Sculpture in downtown Edgartown

According to the United States Census Bureau, the town has a total area of 122.7 square miles (318 km^{2}), of which 27.0 square miles (70 km^{2}) is land and 95.8 square miles (248 km^{2}) (78.01%) is water. Edgartown is ranked 103rd out of 351 communities in the Commonwealth by land area, and is the largest town by land area in Dukes County. Edgartown is bordered by Nantucket Sound to the northeast and east, the Atlantic Ocean to the south, West Tisbury to the west, and Oak Bluffs to the north. The town also shares a common corner with Tisbury (along with West Tisbury and Oak Bluffs).

Edgartown is located at the eastern end of Martha's Vineyard (referred to as "down-island", a vestige of the island's traditional maritime manner of speaking in that as a ship travels east, it is said to be traveling "down east" as longitude decreases towards the Prime Meridian). [An alternative explanation and one prevalent in Maine, is that down east is down wind in the prevailing winds of the New England coast, down island would also be down wind. For those who have spent a lot of time sailing (as opposed to 'power boating'), down wind is more important to a sailor than decreasing longitude.]

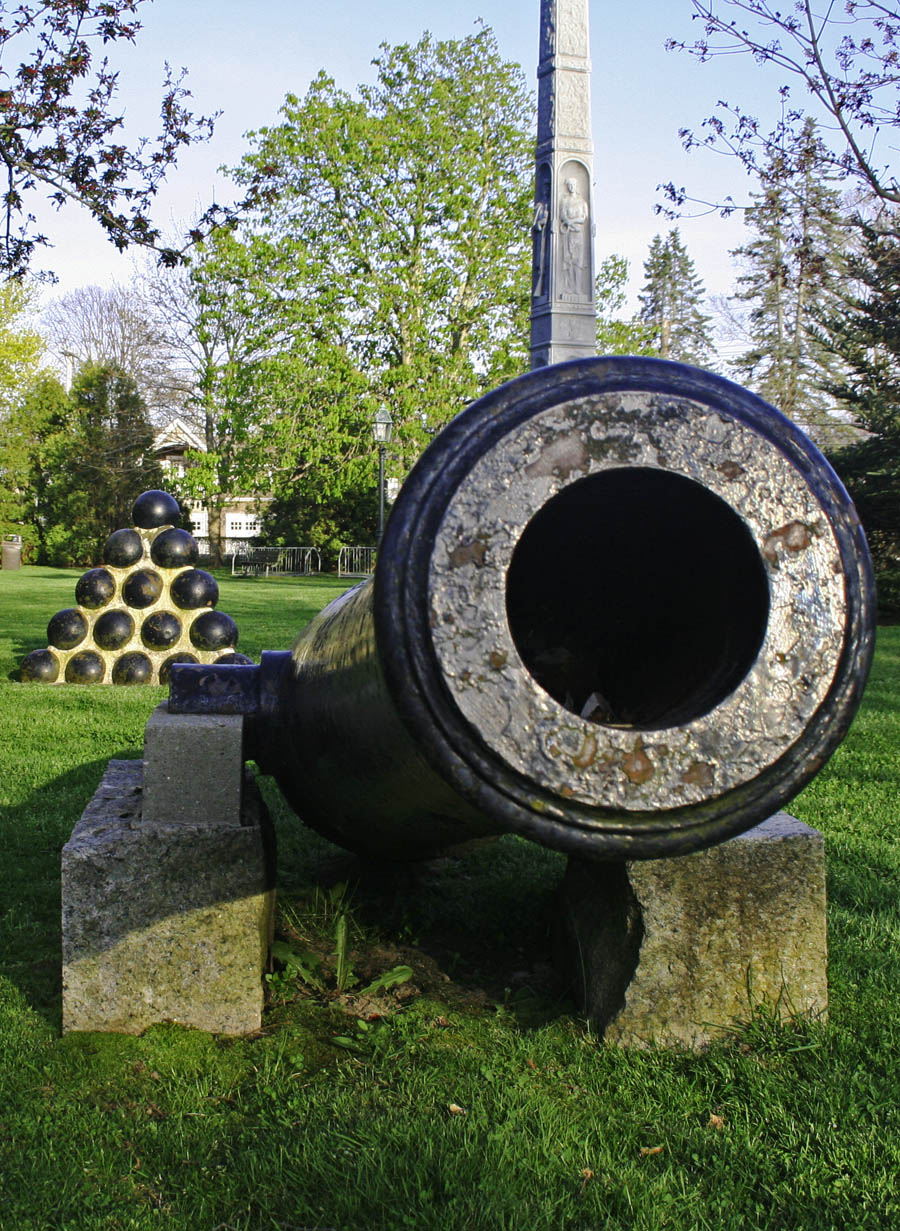
Cannonball Park, Edgartown, Massachusetts

The town of Edgartown includes the smaller island of Chappaquiddick, sometimes connected to the rest of Martha's Vineyard only by a barrier beach which can be breached during storms. Chappaquiddick is separated from the town center by Edgartown Harbor and Katama Bay. The town is close to Nantucket's Muskeget Island, which is seven miles east of Wasque Point, the southeasternmost point of Chappaquiddick.

Katama is the south-central portion of Edgartown. In addition to a beach, Katama has within its boundaries the Katama Airpark, the Katama Farm, the Herring Creek Farm and two resorts. Edgartown is also home to half of the Manuel F. Correllus State Forest, which extends into neighboring West Tisbury. There are nine beaches, a yacht club, and several preserves and reservations in the town, including the Wasque Reservation along the south shore of Chappaquiddick and the Cape Pogue Wildlife Refuge along the east shore of the island. There are two lighthouses in the town, the Cape Pogue Light on Chappaquiddick and the Edgartown Harbor Light in Edgartown Harbor.

== Climate ==
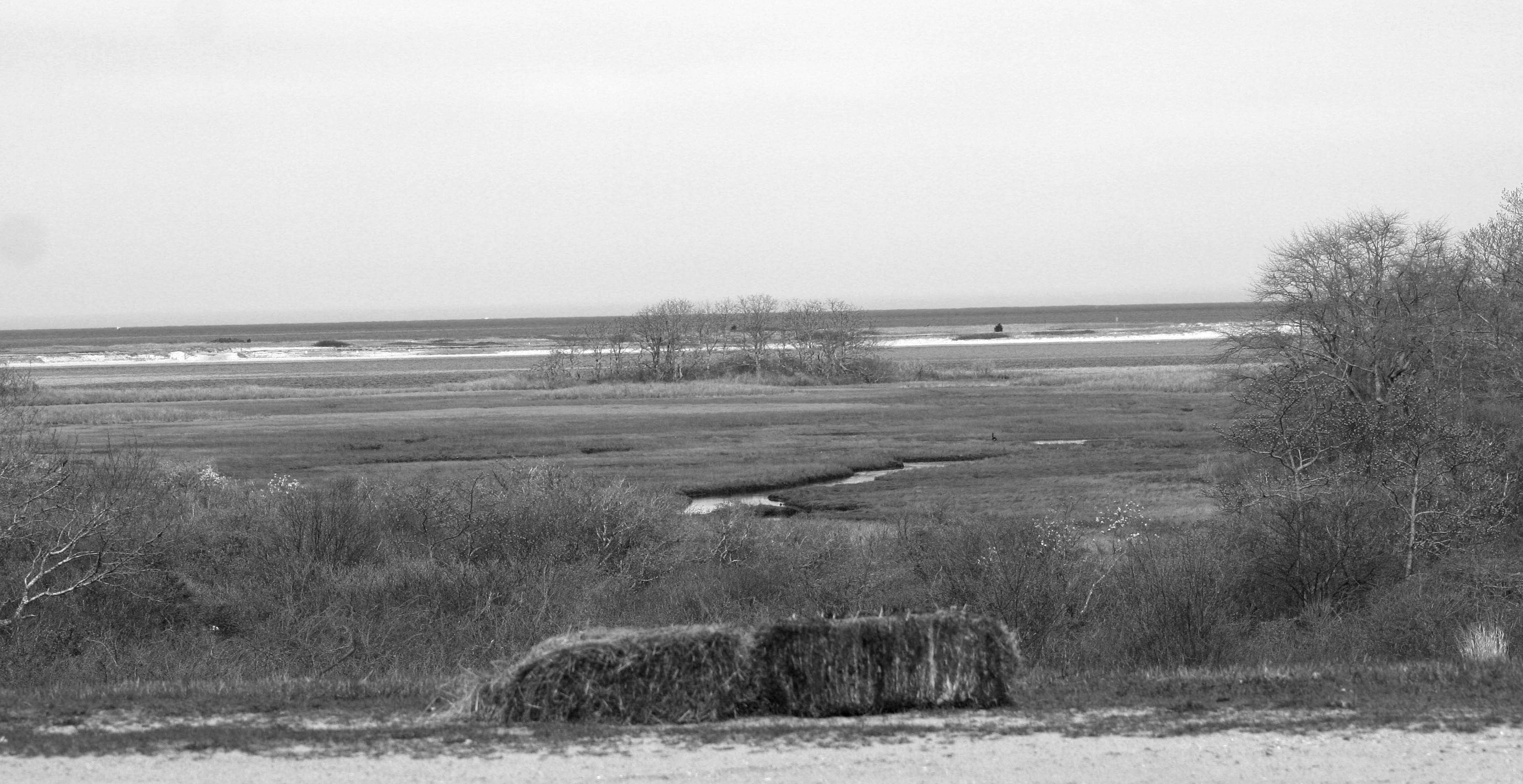
Felix Neck, Edgartown, Massachusetts

Edgartown has a humid subtropical climate (Köppen Cfa) according to most recent temperature averages, making it one of the northernmost (and newest) places in North America with a subtropical climate. Winters are moderately cold with occasional snow and summers are very warm and humid; precipitation is slightly higher than mainland Massachusetts and mostly even year-round, with a slightly drier period around July.

Edgartown's now subtropical climate is an excellent display of climate change, as it had an oceanic climate (Köppen Cfb) under climate normals as recently as 2010, and likely even a warm-summer humid continental climate (Köppen Dfb) due to January temperatures averaging below 32 °F (0 °C) until the late 20th century. Diurnal temperature variation is lower than on the mainland. The warmest night on record is 76 °F (24 °C) in August 2010 and the annual average is 72 °F (22 °C). When wind conditions come from the cold interior during winter, Edgartown can experience heavy cold snaps in spite of its offshore position and low latitude. The mean annual minimum high temperature (in other words, the average lowest high temperature recorded each year) is 20 °F (−7 °C) and the coldest daytime maximum on record was 7 °F (−14 °C) in December 1980. Despite averaging 40 °F (4 °C) average January highs and the mild water temperatures, ice days were recorded every year at the station in its first 75 years operating.

Climate data for Martha's Vineyard (Edgartown, Massachusetts) 1991–2020 normals, extremes 1946–present
Month	Jan	Feb	Mar	Apr	May	Jun	Jul	Aug	Sep	Oct	Nov	Dec	Year
Record high °F (°C)	65 (18)	64 (18)	75 (24)	90 (32)	91 (33)	95 (35)	95 (35)	99 (37)	92 (33)	88 (31)	74 (23)	67 (19)	99 (37)
Mean maximum °F (°C)	55 (13)	55 (13)	61 (16)	70 (21)	80 (27)	86 (30)	90 (32)	88 (31)	84 (29)	76 (24)	67 (19)	59 (15)	91 (33)
Mean daily maximum °F (°C)	40.1 (4.5)	41.5 (5.3)	46.4 (8.0)	55.4 (13.0)	64.9 (18.3)	73.8 (23.2)	80.4 (26.9)	79.9 (26.6)	74.0 (23.3)	64.0 (17.8)	54.4 (12.4)	45.5 (7.5)	60.0 (15.6)
Daily mean °F (°C)	32.9 (0.5)	34.1 (1.2)	39.0 (3.9)	47.5 (8.6)	56.7 (13.7)	65.7 (18.7)	72.3 (22.4)	71.9 (22.2)	66.2 (19.0)	56.1 (13.4)	47.0 (8.3)	38.4 (3.6)	52.3 (11.3)
Mean daily minimum °F (°C)	25.6 (−3.6)	26.8 (−2.9)	31.7 (−0.2)	39.5 (4.2)	48.6 (9.2)	57.6 (14.2)	64.2 (17.9)	63.9 (17.7)	58.4 (14.7)	48.2 (9.0)	39.7 (4.3)	31.3 (−0.4)	44.6 (7.0)
Mean minimum °F (°C)	7 (−14)	10 (−12)	16 (−9)	27 (−3)	35 (2)	46 (8)	54 (12)	53 (12)	44 (7)	33 (1)	23 (−5)	15 (−9)	5 (−15)
Record low °F (°C)	−6 (−21)	−9 (−23)	−7 (−22)	12 (−11)	28 (−2)	37 (3)	45 (7)	41 (5)	32 (0)	22 (−6)	14 (−10)	−5 (−21)	−9 (−23)
Average precipitation inches (mm)	4.10 (104)	3.57 (91)	4.80 (122)	4.18 (106)	3.74 (95)	3.39 (86)	2.64 (67)	3.72 (94)	3.89 (99)	4.63 (118)	4.21 (107)	4.84 (123)	47.71 (1,212)
Average snowfall inches (cm)	8.8 (22)	8.1 (21)	4.7 (12)	0.3 (0.76)	0.0 (0.0)	0.0 (0.0)	0.0 (0.0)	0.0 (0.0)	0.0 (0.0)	0.0 (0.0)	0.0 (0.0)	3.4 (8.6)	25.3 (64)
Average extreme snow depth inches (cm)	5 (13)	5 (13)	3 (7.6)	0 (0)	0 (0)	0 (0)	0 (0)	0 (0)	0 (0)	0 (0)	0 (0)	2 (5.1)	7 (18)
Average precipitation days (≥ 0.01 in)	11.9	9.8	11.4	11.9	12.0	10.2	7.8	8.9	9.3	11.2	11.4	12.1	127.9
Average snowy days (≥ 0.1 in)	3.5	3.3	2.0	0.2	0.0	0.0	0.0	0.0	0.0	0.0	0.1	1.4	10.5
Source: NOAA

== Transportation ==
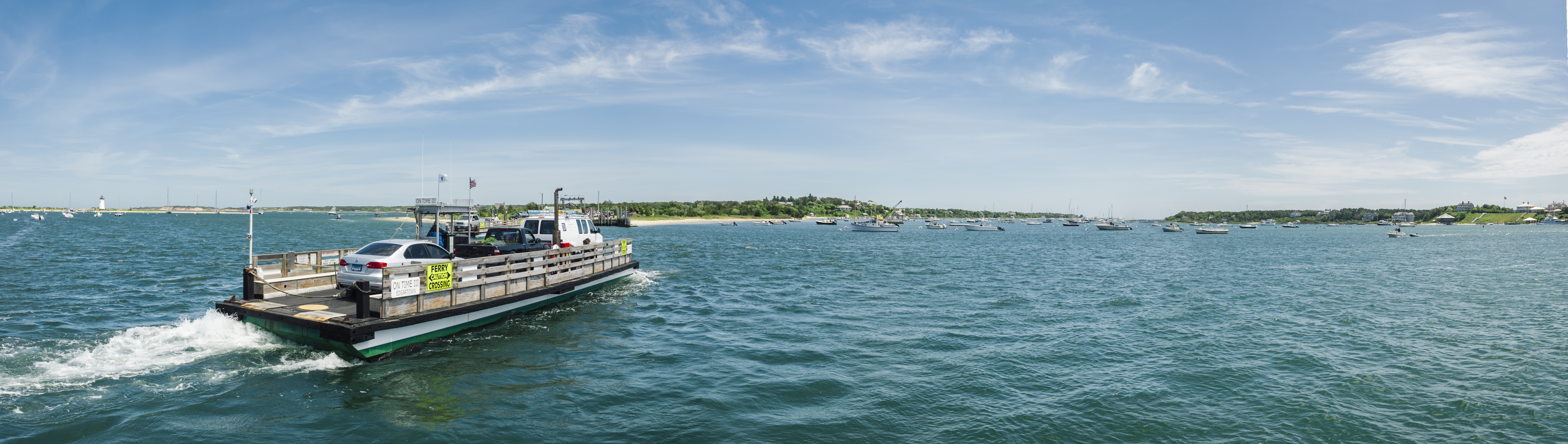
The ferry between Edgartown village and Chappaquiddick Island

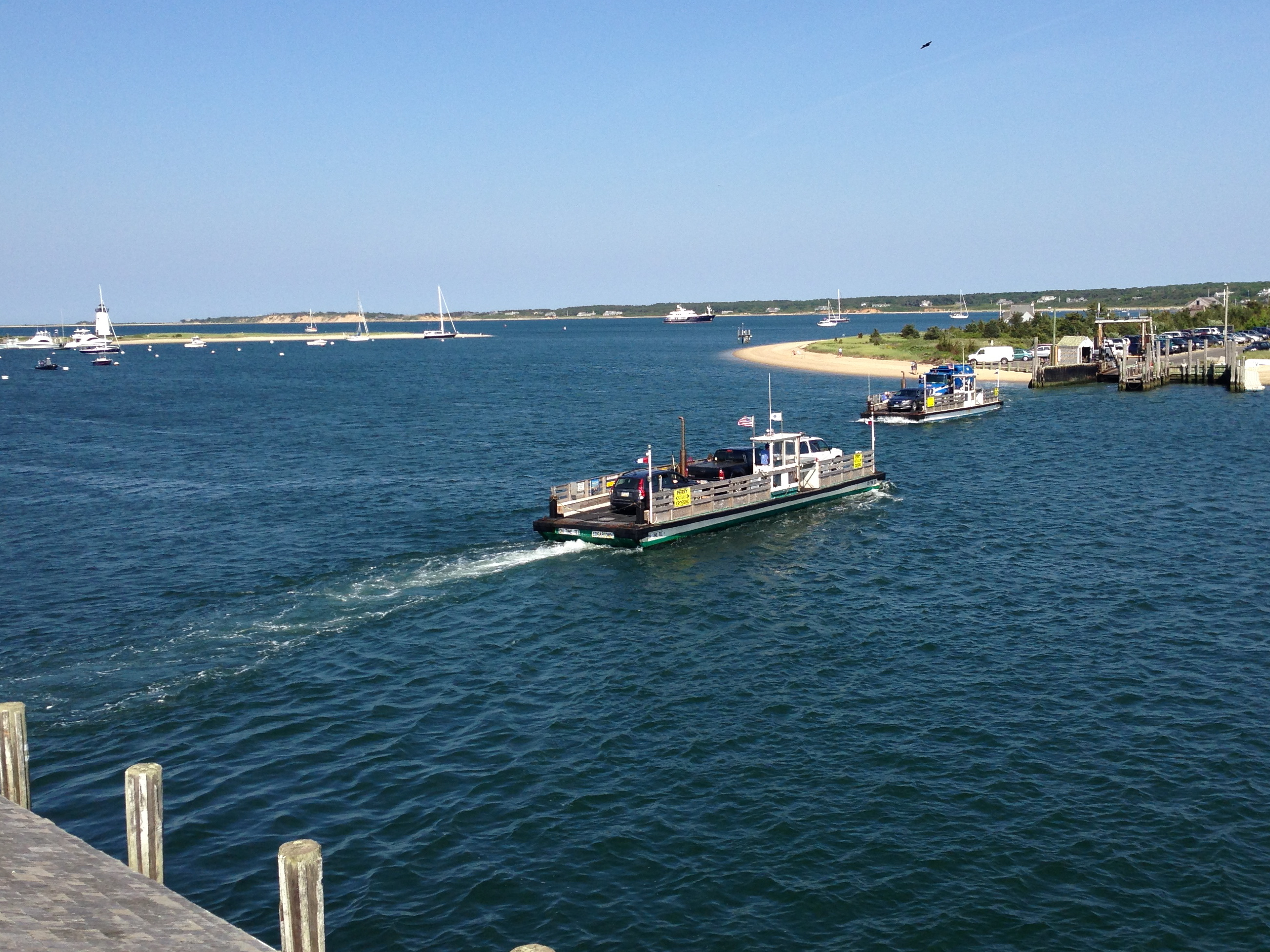
View of the ferries "On Time II" and "On Time III" crossing between Edgartown and Chappaquiddick Island; the Edgartown Harbor Light can be seen in the far distance on the left.

Auto transportation to Chappaquiddick is provided by two ferries, the "On Time II" and "On Time III". A common myth is that the original ferry "On Time" was given its name because the ferry has never had scheduled runs and thus is never late. In fact, the ferry was given this name because a new owner, Foster B. Silva of Chappaquiddick, had less than two weeks to build it before taking over the service on August 1, 1948. The work crew—led by Captain Samuel B. Norton and master boatbuilder Manuel Swartz Roberts, both of Edgartown—built and launched the new ferry "on time." This original "On Time" was converted to a barge dispensing fresh water to visiting yachtsmen after its service as a ferry ended in 1975. The barge was sold and lost track of in the late 1990s. The "On Time II," built in 1969, and the "On Time III," built in 1975 and now owned by Peter. S. Wells and his wife Sally T. Snipes of Chappaquiddick, are still in service.

In addition to the On Time Ferry, Edgartown is home to another ferry, the Pied Piper, which runs seasonally between the town and Falmouth, on Cape Cod. There are two airports in the town. Katama Airpark is a grass field and located between Katama Bay and Edgartown Great Pond in the southern part of town; it serves smaller private aircraft. Along the border of the state forest lies Martha's Vineyard Airport, which Edgartown shares with West Tisbury. This airport is used for commercial commuter flights from nearby sites on the mainland and Nantucket.

== Demographics ==
Historical population
Year	Pop.	±%
1790	1,332	—
1850	1,990	+49.4%
1860	2,118	+6.4%
1870	1,516	−28.4%
1880	1,303	−14.1%
1890	1,156	−11.3%
1900	1,209	+4.6%
1910	1,191	−1.5%
1920	1,190	−0.1%
1930	1,276	+7.2%
1940	1,370	+7.4%
1950	1,508	+10.1%
1960	1,474	−2.3%
1970	1,481	+0.5%
1980	2,204	+48.8%
1990	3,062	+38.9%
2000	3,779	+23.4%
2010	4,067	+7.6%
2020	5,168	+27.1%
2024	5,328	+3.1%
U.S. Decennial Census; 2010 2020

=== 2020 Census ===
Edgartown town, Dukes County, Massachusetts – Racial and ethnic composition Note: the US Census treats Hispanic/Latino as an ethnic category. This table excludes Latinos from the racial categories and assigns them to a separate category. Hispanics/Latinos may be of any race.
Race / Ethnicity (NH = Non-Hispanic)	Pop 2000	Pop 2010	Pop 2020	% 2000	% 2010	% 2020
White alone (NH)	3,500	3,550	4,248	92.62%	87.29%	82.20%
Black or African American alone (NH)	62	85	114	1.64%	2.09%	2.21%
Native American or Alaska Native alone (NH)	17	17	13	0.45%	0.42%	0.25%
Asian alone (NH)	18	19	45	0.48%	0.47%	0.87%
Native Hawaiian or Pacific Islander alone (NH)	1	1	1	0.03%	0.02%	0.02%
Other race alone (NH)	54	193	158	1.43%	4.75%	3.06%
Mixed race or Multiracial (NH)	83	103	443	2.20%	2.53%	8.57%
Hispanic or Latino (any race)	44	99	146	1.16%	2.43%	2.83%
Total	3,779	4,067	5,168	100.00%	100.00%	100.00%

=== 2000 Census ===
As of the census of 2000, there were 3,779 people, 1,582 households, and 957 families residing in the town. The population density was 140.0 inhabitants per square mile (54.1/km^{2}). There were 4,360 housing units at an average density of 161.5 per square mile (62.4/km^{2}). The racial makeup of the town was 93.3% White, 1.8% African American, 0.5% Native American, 0.5% Asian, <0.1% Pacific Islander, 1.5% from other races, and 2.3% from two or more races. Hispanic or Latino of any race were 1.2% of the population.

There were 1,582 households, out of which 28.3% had children under the age of 18 living with them, 47.7% were married couples living together, 8.6% had a female householder with no husband present, and 39.5% were non-families. 30.1% of all households were made up of individuals, and 10.3% had someone living alone who was 65 years of age or older. The average household size was 2.35 and the average family size was 2.92.

In the town, the population was spread out, with 22.3% under the age of 18, 5.8% from 18 to 24, 30.9% from 25 to 44, 28.3% from 45 to 64, and 12.6% who were 65 years of age or older. The median age was 40 years. For every 100 females, there were 102.4 males. For every 100 females age 18 and over, there were 99.2 males.

The median income for a household in the town was $50,407, and the median income for a family was $55,153. Males had a median income of $36,615 versus $30,205 for females. The per capita income for the town was $25,740. About 2.7% of families and 4.2% of the population were below the poverty line, including 2.5% of those under age 18 and 1.3% of those age 65 or over.

In 2003 the Vineyard Gazette estimated that there were 15,000 year-round inhabitants of the island with a summer increase to 105,000. Over the last 20 years there has been a continuous growth in the population of the island, although many of the large expanses of undeveloped land and many vistas remain. The summer season, which previously lasted from mid-June through Labor Day weekend has been gradually extended and now includes the period from Memorial Day through Columbus Day.

== Government ==
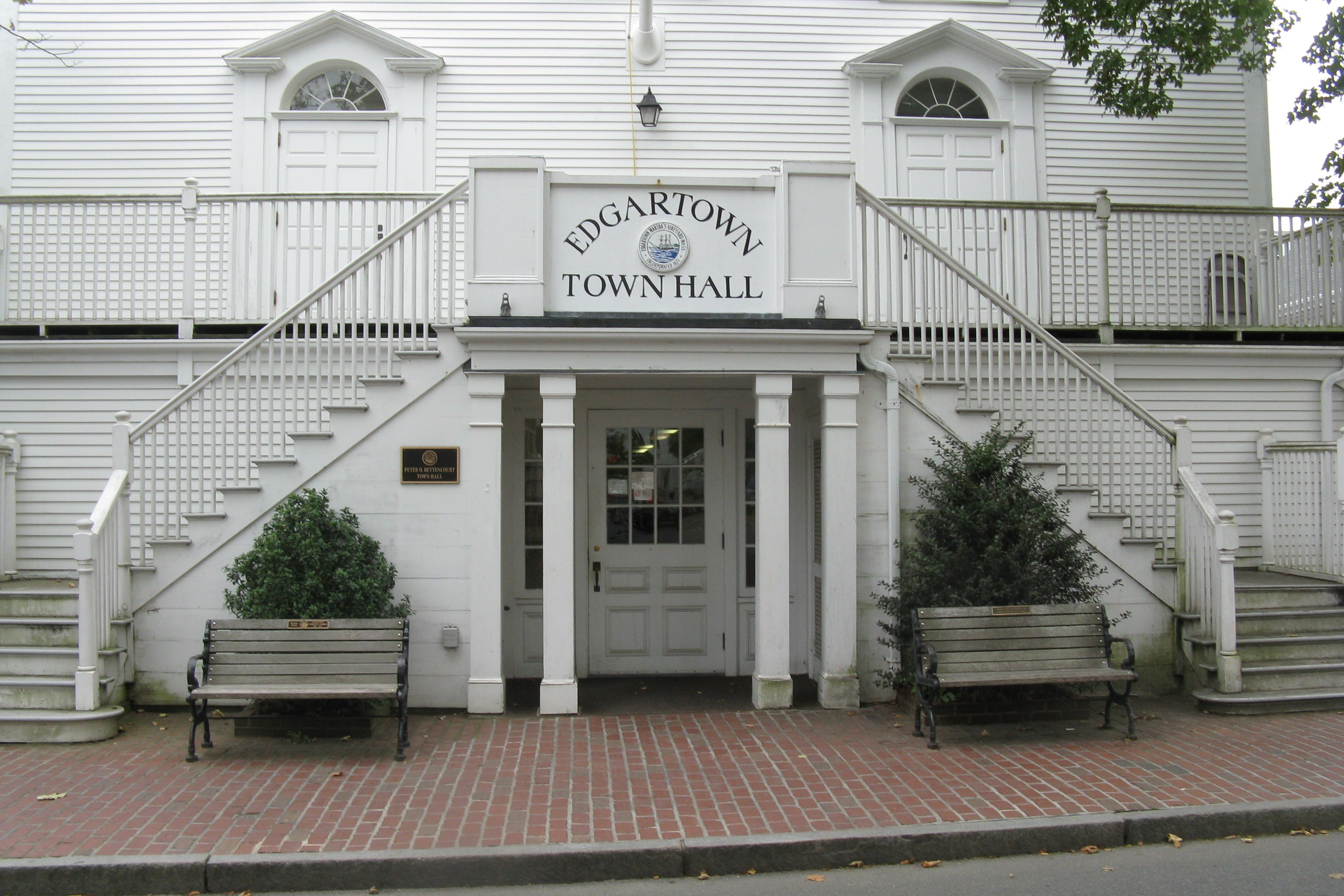
Town Hall

Edgartown is the county seat of Dukes County.

On the national level, Edgartown is a part of Massachusetts's 9th congressional district, and is currently represented by William R. Keating. The state's junior (Class II) member of the United States Senate is Ed Markey, and the senior (Class I) Senator is Elizabeth Warren.

On the state level, Edgartown is represented in the Massachusetts House of Representatives as a part of the Barnstable, Dukes and Nantucket district, which includes all of Martha's Vineyard and Nantucket, as well as a portion of Falmouth. The town is represented in the Massachusetts Senate as a portion of the Cape and Islands district, which includes all of Martha's Vineyard, Nantucket and most of Barnstable County (with the exception of Bourne, Sandwich, Falmouth and a portion of Barnstable). All of Dukes County is patrolled by the Fifth (Oak Bluffs) Barracks of Troop D of the Massachusetts State Police.

Edgartown is governed on the local level by the open town meeting form of government and is led by a Town Administrator and a board of selectmen. The town has its own police and fire departments, both located just west of the historic center of town. The current police chief is Bruce McNamee. The town has one post office, located further west and south of the wildlife preserve at Sengekontacket Pond. The town's Free Public Library is located in the center of town. Edgartown is also the site of the Dukes County Courthouse, the only courthouse on the island.

== Education ==
Edgartown is part of the Martha's Vineyard Regional School District along with Aquinnah, Chilmark, Oak Bluffs, Tisbury, and West Tisbury. Students in Edgartown attend Edgartown Elementary School, from grades K–8. High School students then attend Martha's Vineyard Regional High School. The MVRHS's teams are nicknamed the Vineyarders, and their colors are violet and white. The school has a longstanding rivalry with Nantucket High School, with both competing for the Island Cup on an annual basis.

== Notable people ==
- Ruth Gordon
- Helen Jernegan
- Patricia Neal, stage and screen actress
- Enid Yandell, sculptor

== See also ==
- Edgartown Yacht Club
