= Katama Airpark =

Airport in Massachusetts, US

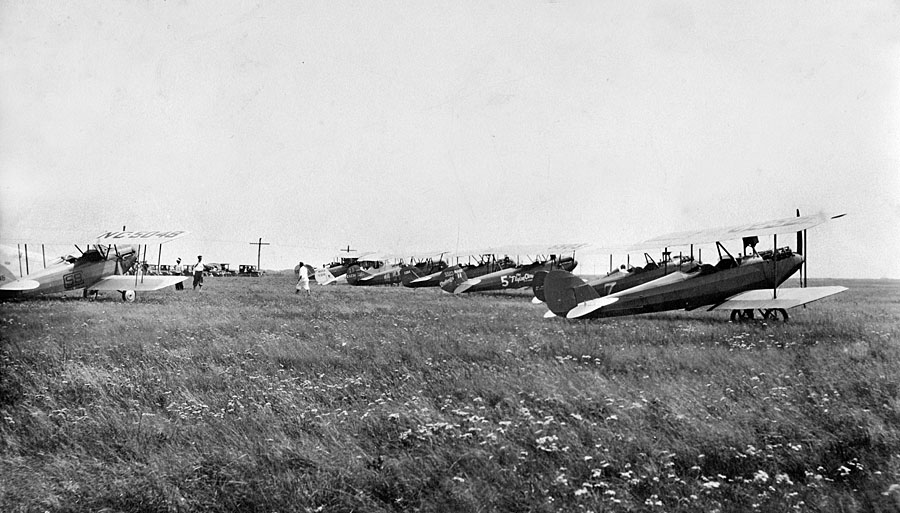
- Edgartown Airfield, as it appeared in the 1920s
- IATA: none; ICAO: none; FAA LID: 1B2

Summary
- Airport type: Public
- Owner: Town of Edgartown
- Serves: Martha's Vineyard
- Location: Edgartown, Massachusetts, U.S.
- Elevation AMSL: 18 ft (5.5 m)
- Coordinates: 41°21′30.4220″N 70°31′28.09″W
- Website: www.katamaairfield.com

Map
- Interactive map of Katama Airpark

Runways
Direction	Length		Surface
Direction	ft	m	Surface
3/21	3,700	1,128	Turf
6/24	2,700	823	Turf
17/35	2,600	792	Turf

Statistics (2023)
- Based aircraft: 1
- Source: FAA Form 5010 for 1B2, 2023

Katama Airpark (FAA LID: 1B2) is a public airport in the Katama section of Edgartown, Massachusetts, in Dukes County on the island of Martha's Vineyard. The airport, owned by the Town of Edgartown, has three runways, averages 22 takeoffs and landings per day, and has one aircraft based on its field.

Katama is one of three airports on the island. The main airport Martha's Vineyard Airport (MVY) is the only one with commercial service and handles the majority of the island's general aviation traffic. The third airport is the smaller Trade Wind Airport, a grass airfield in Oak Bluffs.

== History ==
During World War II, Martha's Vineyard Airport functioned as an outer defense and a training facility for gunnery and pilots. In addition to the main airport, there is a small airfield at Katama near a gunnery practice area on the beach. Following World War II, this airport was purchased by Steven Gentle, who ran the Katama Airpark until the 1980s when it was purchased with state conservation funds (as this airfield has five endangered plant or animal species).

== Facilities ==
The town of Edgartown manages the airport. During the season (roughly May 31 to Labor Day), biplane and glider rides are available, as well as flight instruction in four different aircraft.

A restaurant is adjacent to the airfield, currently named "Katama Kitchen."

The Woods Hole Oceanographic Institute has a small data monitoring building adjacent to the hangar. It monitors wave action, beach erosion, and offshore wave action. It is not open to the public.

== Accidents ==
On June 22, 2005, a Cessna Skyhawk stalled and crashed during a landing attempt, injuring the pilot and two passengers. This crash was the subject of a lengthy trial which concluded in 2012 with Cessna awarding a settlement of $1.7 million (2012 USD) to the injured party. The plaintiffs alleged that faulty cockpit seat rails had caused the pilot to unexpectedly slide backward and lose control of the plane while attempting to abort a landing.

On August 3, 2015, a Piper Cherokee was damaged when it rotated forward onto its nose during a rough landing. No passengers were harmed during this incident.

== See also ==
- List of airports in Massachusetts
