= Fairchild F-27 =

Regional twin turboprop airliner

F-27 / FH-227
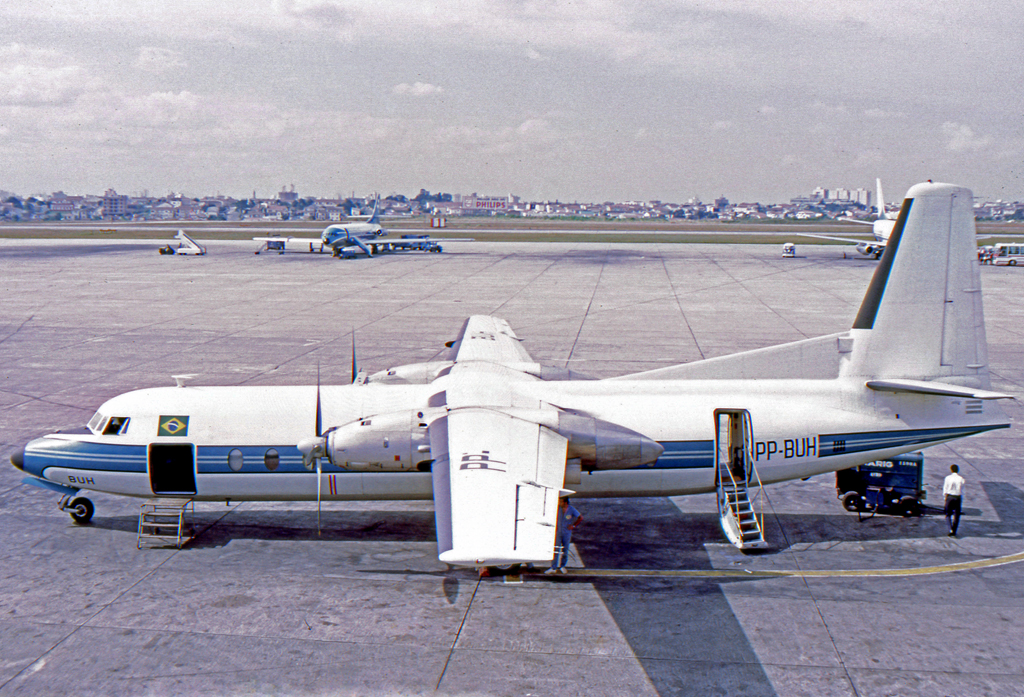
- Fairchild Hiller FH-227B registration PP-BUH in 1972, later LV-MGV which crashed in 2003

General information
- Type: Airliner
- Manufacturer: Fairchild Hiller
- Status: Retired
- Number built: 128 (F-27); 78 (FH-227)

History
- Introduction date: 1958
- First flight: April 12, 1958 (F-27); February 2, 1966 (FH-227)
- Developed from: Fokker F27 Friendship

The Fairchild F-27 and Fairchild Hiller FH-227 are versions of the Fokker F27 Friendship twin-engined, turboprop, passenger aircraft formerly manufactured under license by Fairchild Hiller in the United States. The Fairchild F-27 was similar to the standard Fokker F27, while the FH-227 was an independently developed, stretched version.

== Design and development ==
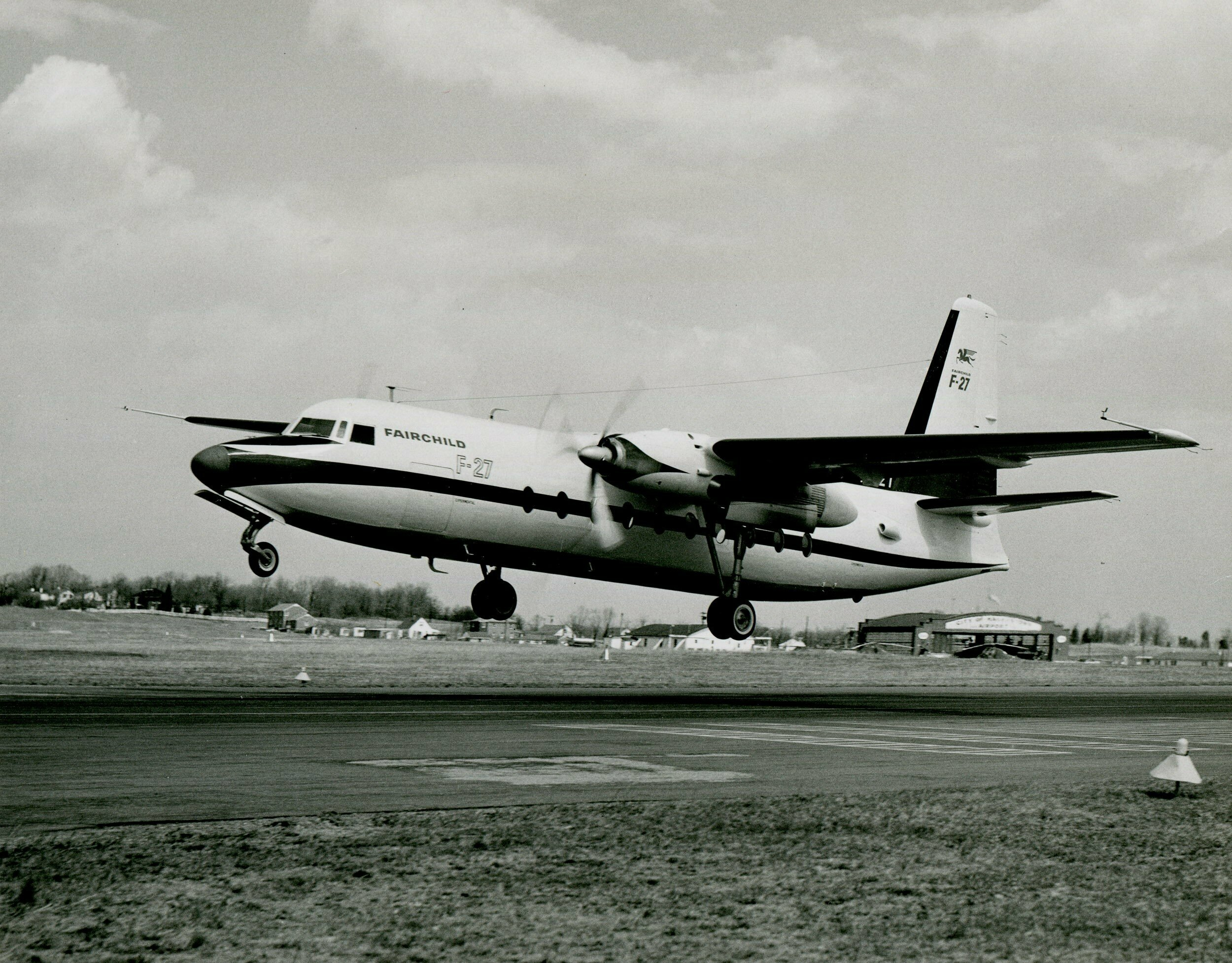
Prototype of the F-27 in 1958-1959

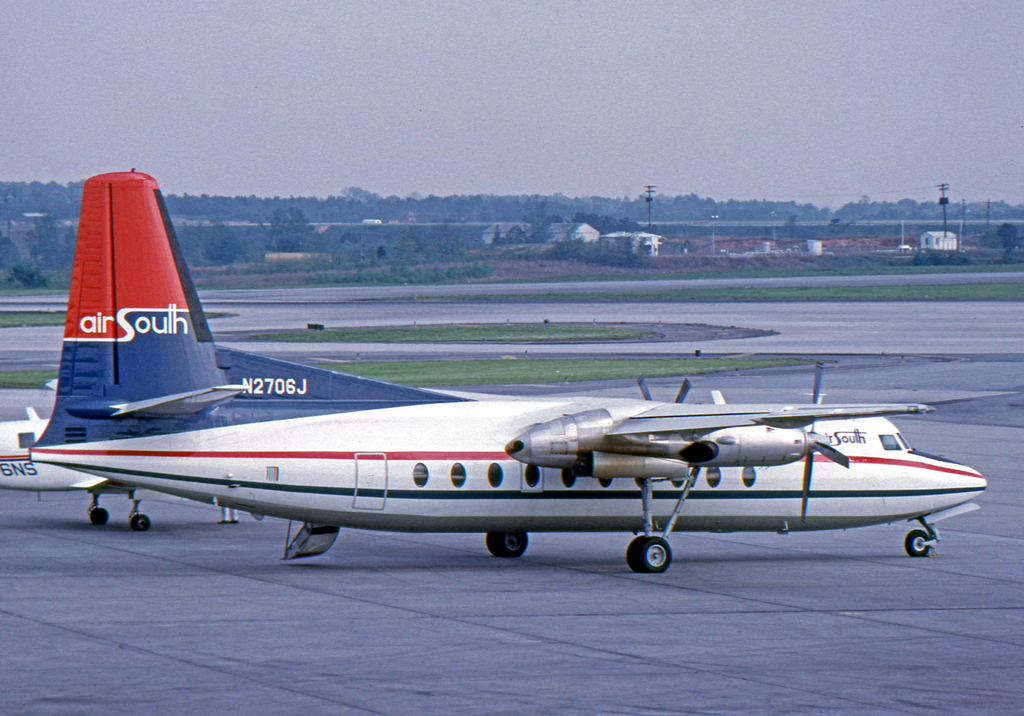
Fairchild F-27J of Air South in 1974, showing the shorter fuselage of this version

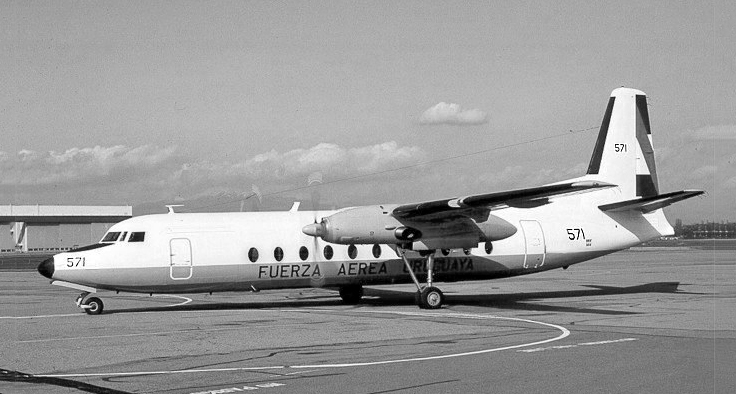
An FH-227D used in the movie Alive in the livery of Fuerza Aérea Uruguaya Flight 571 that crashed in the Andes in 1972

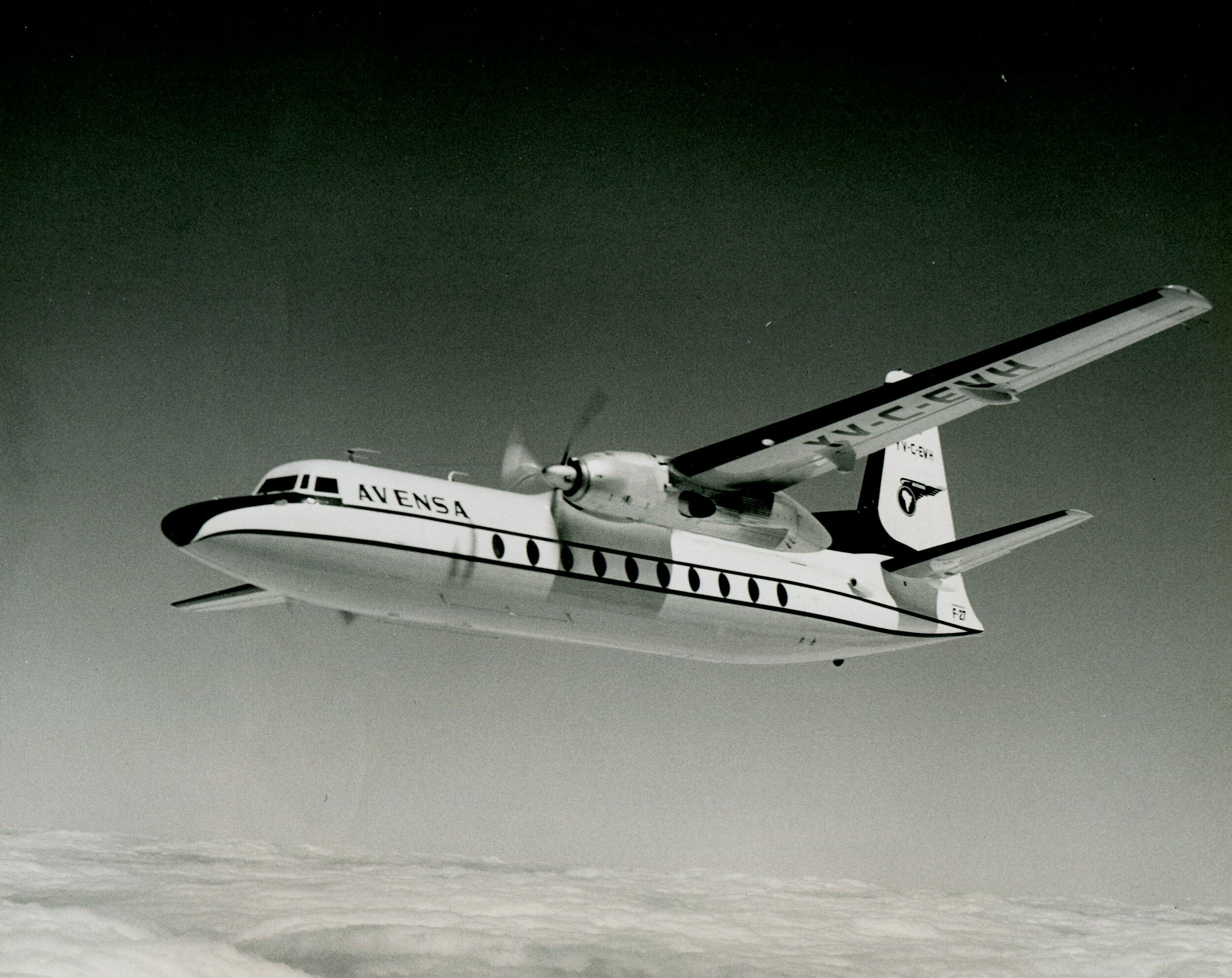
Venezuelan carrier Avensa was the first South American F-27 customer, with first delivery September 1958. This specific aircraft (YV-C-EVH) was lost in an accident in February 1962, including all 23 occupants.

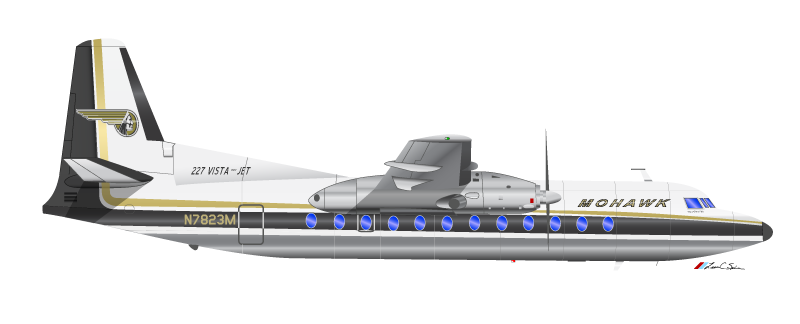
A Fairchild Hiller FH-227B of the defunct Mohawk Airlines circa 1970

The Fokker F27 began life as a 1950 design study known as the P275, a 32-seater powered by two Rolls-Royce Dart turboprops. With the aid of Dutch government funding, the P275 evolved into the F27, which first flew on November 24, 1955. The first prototype was powered by Dart 507s and would have seated 28. To correct a slight tail heaviness and to allow for more seats, the second prototype (which first flew in January 1957) had a 3-foot-longer (0.91 m) fuselage, which allowed seating for 32.

By this stage, Fokker had signed an agreement that would have Fairchild build Friendships in the U.S. as the F-27. The first aircraft of either manufacturer to enter service in the U.S. was, in fact, a Fairchild-built F-27, with West Coast Airlines in September 1958. Other Fairchild F-27 operators in the U.S. included Air South, Air West and successor Hughes Airwest, Air Wisconsin, Allegheny Airlines, Aloha Airlines, Bonanza Air Lines, Horizon Air, Ozark Air Lines, Pacific Air Lines, Piedmont Airlines (1948–1989), Northern Consolidated Airlines, and successor Wien Air Alaska. Fairchild subsequently manufactured a larger, stretched version of the F-27 named the Fairchild Hiller FH-227, which was operated by U.S.-based air carriers Delta Air Lines, Mohawk Airlines, Northeast Airlines, Ozark Air Lines, Piedmont Airlines (1948–1989), and Wien Air Alaska.

Fairchild F-27s differed from the initial Fokker F27 Mk 100s in having basic seating for 40, heavier external skinning, a lengthened nose capable of housing weather radar, and additional fuel capacity. They also incorporated a passenger airstair door in the rear of the aircraft, operated by a flight attendant, which eliminated the need for separate stairs on the ground.

Developments were the F-27A with more powerful engines and the F-27B Combi aircraft version. The F-27B Combi mixed passenger/freight version was operated in Alaska by Northern Consolidated Airlines and Wien Air Alaska.

Fairchild independently developed the stretched FH-227, which appeared almost two years earlier than Fokker's similar F27 Mk 500. The FH-227 featured a 1.83 m (6 ft) stretch over standard-length F27/F-27s, taking standard seating to 56, with a larger cargo area between the cockpit and the passenger cabin.

== Production ==
In addition to the 581 F27s built by Fokker, 128 F-27s and 78 FH-227s were built. As of February 2010, only one Fairchild FH-227 aircraft, FH-227E serial number 501 belonging to the Myanmar Air Force, remained in active service.

== Former operators ==
(Source: Roach & Eastwood)

Algeria

- Sahara Airlines (FH-227)

Argentina

- CATA Linea Aerea (FH-227)

Bahamas

- Bahamasair (FH-227)

Brazil

- Paraense Transportes Aereos (FH-227)
- TABA – Transportes Aereos da Bacia Amazonica (FH-227)
- Varig (FH-227)

Canada

- Norcanair (F-27)
- Nordair (FH-227)
- Time Air (F-27)
- Quebecair (F-27)

Chile

- Aeronor Chile (FH-27A)

France

- Air Melanesie (F-27)
- Air Polynesie (F-27)
- TAT European Airlines (FH-227)

Republic of Korea

- Korean Air Lines (F-27, FH-227)

Turkey

- Turkish Airlines (F-27)

United Kingdom

- Skyways (British airline) (FH-227)

United States

- Airlift International (F-27, FH-227)
- Air New England (FH-227) – former Delta and Northeast aircraft plus two others
- AirPac (FH-227B) – Alaska-based air carrier
- Air South (F-27)
- Air West (subsequently renamed Hughes Airwest) – former Bonanza Air Lines, Pacific Air Lines and West Coast Airlines F-27 aircraft
- Air Wisconsin (F-27)
- Allegheny Airlines (F-27)
- Aloha Airlines (F-27)
- Aspen Airways (F-27)
- Bonanza Air Lines (F-27)
- Britt Airways (F-27, FH-227)
- Connectair (F-27)
- Delta Air Lines (FH-227B) – former Northeast Airlines aircraft
- Empire Airlines (F-27)
- Horizon Air (F-27)
- Hughes Airwest (F-27) – former Air West aircraft
- Mohawk Airlines (FH-227)
- Northeast Airlines (FH-227)
- Northern Consolidated Airlines (F-27B combi aircraft) – merged with Wien Air Alaska
- Oceanair (F-27)
- Ozark Airlines (F-27, FH-227)
- Pacific Air Lines (F-27)
- Piedmont Airlines (1948–1989) (F-27, FH-227)
- Shawnee Airlines (FH-227)
- Southeast Airlines (F-27)
- West Coast Airlines (F-27)
- Wien Air Alaska (F-27B Combi aircraft) – Former Northern Consolidated Airlines aircraft that were capable of mixed passenger/cargo operations

Uruguay

- Uruguayan Air Force

Venezuela

- Avensa (F-27)

== Accidents and incidents ==
Of the 206 Fairchild F-27s built, at least 33 experienced fatal crashes between 1960 and 2003:

1. On November 7, 1960, an AREA Ecuador F-27A struck the dormant Atacazo volcano in bad weather during its approach to Mariscal Sucre International Airport in Quito, Ecuador after a domestic flight from Simón Bolívar International Airport, in Guayaquil. The crash, 16 kilometres (9.9 mi) south of Quito and 150 meters to the summit of the Atacazo, killed all the 37 occupants of the plane. This particular aircraft (msn. 1, reg. HC-ADV) was the first prototype of the Fairchild F-27, which had been sold to AREA Ecuador in 1959. At the time, it was the worst aerial crash in the history of Ecuador, the first and worst fatal loss of an F-27, and the first accident involving the then-recently-opened Quito airport.
2. On February 25, 1962, an Avensa F-27A crashed into a mountain on Margarita Island, killing all 23 on board.
3. On March 8, 1962, a Turkish Airlines F-27 crashed into the Taurus Mountains, killing all 11 on board.
4. On January 17, 1963, a West Coast Airlines F-27 training flight crashed into the Great Salt Lake, killing all 3 aboard.
5. On May 7, 1964, Pacific Air Lines Flight 773, an F-27A on a short flight from Stockton, California to San Francisco, crashed and killed all 44 aboard, after a passenger shot both pilots in a murder–suicide.
6. On November 15, 1964, Bonanza Air Lines Flight 114, flying an F-27 from Phoenix, Arizona, to Las Vegas, Nevada, crashed into a mountain south of Las Vegas during poor weather. All 26 passengers and three crew on board died.
7. On March 10, 1967, West Coast Airlines Flight 720 crashed with four fatalities and no survivors near Klamath Falls, Oregon. The F-27 was bound for Medford, Oregon, from Klamath Falls, and crashed due to ice accumulation on the aircraft.
8. On March 8, 1968, the F-27 aircraft flying Air Manila Flight 507 was destroyed in a turbulent thundercloud over the Sibuyan Sea, killing all 14 on board.
9. On May 4, 1968, an Eastex F-27J killed the two people on board, from a failed landing at El Paisano Ranch, Texas.
10. On August 10, 1968, Piedmont Airlines Flight 230 was on an ILS localizer-only approach to Charleston-Kanawha County Airport (CRW) in West Virginia when the FH-227B struck trees 360 feet from the runway threshold. All three crew members and 32 of the 34 passengers perished. The National Transportation Safety Board blamed the accident on an "unrecognized loss of altitude orientation during the final portion of an approach into shallow, dense fog."
11. On October 25, 1968, Northeast Airlines Flight 946, an FH-227, crashed on Moose Mountain near Hanover, New Hampshire, on approach to Lebanon Municipal Airport. Of the 39 passengers and three crew on board, 32 were killed.
12. On December 2, 1968, Wien Consolidated Airlines F-27B, N4905B, encountered turbulence near Pedro Bay, Alaska that tore off the right wing. All 39 on board died. Pre-existing fatigue cracks contributed to wing failure. (NTSB DCA69A0006)
13. On November 19, 1969, Mohawk Airlines Flight 411, a short flight between Albany and Glens Falls, New York, crashed into Pilot Knob Mountain, killing all 14 on board the FH-227B.
14. On March 14, 1970, a Paraense FH-227B registration PP-BUF operating flight 903 from São Luiz to Belém-Val de Cans, Brazil, while on final approach to land at Belém, crashed into Guajará Bay. Of the 39 passengers and crew, two survived.
15. On February 5, 1972, TAC Colombia HK-1139, an F-27 flying from Bogotá to Valledupar, crashed into a mountain and killed all 19 occupants.
16. On March 3, 1972, Mohawk Airlines Flight 405, an FH-227, crashed into a house in Albany, New York, on approach to Albany County Airport. The crew had difficulty getting the cruise lock to disengage in one of the engines. While the crew attempted to deal with the problem, the aircraft crashed short of the airfield, killing 16 of the 48 people in the aircraft and one person on the ground. The lone surviving crew member was stewardess Sandra Quinn.
17. On October 13, 1972, Uruguayan Air Force Flight 571, an FH-227D carrying 45 people, crashed in the remote Andes mountains. The pilot mistakenly believed the aircraft had overflown Curicó, the turning point to fly north, and begin descending. He failed to notice that instrument readings indicated he was still 60–70 km (37–43 mi) east of Curicó. The plane crashed at 11,000 feet (3,400 m) on a glacier; 16 of the 45 people on board survived for 72 days by resorting to cannibalism, eating the dead. The event became known as the "Miracle in the Andes", and was the subject of the 1974 book Alive: The Story of the Andes Survivors, the 1976 Mexican film Survive! (Supervivientes de los Andes), the 1993 film Alive, and the 2023 film Society of the Snow.
18. On July 23, 1973, Ozark Air Lines Flight 809 was operated by an FH-227, registration N4215. The flight was scheduled to go from Nashville, Tennessee, to St. Louis, Missouri, with four intermediate stops. The segments to Clarksville, Paducah, Cape Girardeau, and Marion proceeded normally. Crashed in storm downdraft on final approach to St. Louis. 38 fatalities, 6 survivors.
19. On August 30, 1975, Wien Air Alaska F-27B, N4904, crashed into mountain on approach in bad weather at Gambell, Alaska, killing 10 and seriously injuring 20. (NTSB DCA76AZ004)
20. On March 29, 1979, Québecair Flight 255, an F-27, crashed after take-off, killing 17 and injuring seven.
21. On January 24, 1980, a Burma Air Force FH-227 crashed when an engine failed shortly after take-off, killing all but one of the 44 people on board. One person on the ground was injured.
22. On June 2, 1980, an F-27J operated by Lloyd Aéreo Boliviano crashed into a hill while approaching Yacuiba Airport, killing all 13 occupants.
23. On June 12, 1982, a TABA – Transportes Aéreos da Bacia Amazônica FH-227 registration PT-LBV en route from Eirunepé to Tabatinga, Brazil, on approach to Tabatinga collided with a pole in poor visibility and crashed onto a parking lot. All 40 passengers and four crew died.
24. On December 9, 1982, an Aeronor Chile F-27A was operating as Flight 304 on a scheduled domestic service from Santiago to La Serena, Chile. On final approach to La Serena's La Florida Airport, the aircraft stalled and crashed, bursting into flames on impact. All 42 passengers and four crew on board died.
25. On March 16, 1984, a Lloyd Aéreo Boliviano F-27M crashed into Mount Pilón en route to San Borja, claiming the lives of all 23 occupants.
26. On March 4, 1988, a TAT European Airlines FH-227B operating a scheduled service from Nancy to Paris Orly as TAT Flight 230 crashed near Fontainebleau, France, killing all 23 occupants. An electrical malfunction during the start of the aircraft's descent had resulted in a sudden loss of control.
27. On April 10, 1989, Uni-Air International Flight 602 from Paris to Valence crashed into a mountain because of a navigational error, killing all 22 aboard the FH-227B.
28. On May 10, 1990, Aviacsa Flight 100 killed all four crew members and 20 of the 36 passengers, from a failed landing of the F-27J aircraft at Tuxtla Gutiérrez Airport in Mexico. Investigators attributed the crash to the crew's lack of experience and coordination, in the airline's first week of operation.
29. On June 6, 1990, TABA FH-227 registration PT-ICA flying from Belém-Val de Cans to Cuiabá, Brazil, via Altamira and other stops, while on approach under fog to land at Altamira, descended below the approach path, collided with trees, and crashed 850 m short of the runway. Of the 41 passengers and crew, 23 died.
30. On January 25, 1993, TABA FH-227, registration PT-LCS, operating a cargo flight from Belém-Val de Cans to Altamira, Brazil, crashed into the jungle near Altamira during night-time approach procedures. The crew of three died.
31. On November 28, 1995, TABA FH-227, registration PP-BUJ, operating a cargo flight from Belém-Val de Cans to Santarém, Brazil, crashed on its second attempt to approach Santarém. The crew of two and one of the passenger occupants died.
32. On January 17, 2002, an FH-227E (reg. HC-AYM, sn. 511) belonging to the Ecuadorian state-owned Petroecuador oil company, flying from Quito's airport to Lago Agrio Airport (150 km. west of Quito), in the Amazon region province of Sucumbíos, went off course and flew into the 4500 meter-high Cerro El Tigre mountain in Colombia's Putumayo Department, 14 km. across from the border with Ecuador and approximately 50 miles (80 km.) from its destination. All 21 passengers (Petroecuador employees) plus the five crew members were killed in the crash. The controlled flight into terrain was caused by a loss of situational awareness by the pilots, owing to distractions (lack of sterile cockpit rule) and poor crew resource management, compounded by poor visibility (fog) and the plane's lack of a ground proximity warning system.
33. On October 26, 2003, an FH-227B cargo flight by CATA Línea Aérea crashed after an engine failed during takeoff from Buenos Aires, killing all five aboard.

== Specifications (FH-227E) ==
Data from Jane's All The World's Aircraft 1969-70.

General characteristics

- Crew: Two (pilot and co-pilot)
- Capacity: 44–52 passengers or 11,200 lb (5,100 kg) payload
- Length: 83 ft 8 in (25.50 m)
- Wingspan: 95 ft 2 in (29.01 m)
- Height: 27 ft 7 in (8.41 m)
- Wing area: 754 sq ft (70.0 m^{2})
- Aspect ratio: 12:1
- Airfoil: NACA 64-421 (mod.) at root, NACA 64-415 (mod.) at tip
- Empty weight: 22,923 lb (10,398 kg)
- Max takeoff weight: 43,500 lb (19,731 kg)
- Fuel capacity: 1,364 US gal (1,136 imp gal; 5,160 L) normal, optional tanks for up to 1,004 US gal (836 imp gal; 3,800 L) extra
- Powerplant: 2 × Rolls-Royce Dart RDa.7 Mk 532-7L turboprops, 2,300 shp (1,700 kW) each (take-off power) (ehp)
- Propellers: 4-bladed Rotol constant-speed propeller, 12 ft 6 in (3.81 m) diameter

Performance

- Maximum speed: 255 kn (294 mph, 473 km/h) at 15,000 ft (4,600 m)
- Cruise speed: 230 kn (270 mph, 430 km/h) at 25,000 ft (7,600 m) (econ. cruise)
- Stall speed: 75.9 kn (87.3 mph, 140.5 km/h) (flaps down)
- Never exceed speed: 288 kn (331 mph, 533 km/h) EAS
- Range: 570 nmi (656 mi, 1,056 km) with maximum payload, 1,438 nmi (1,655 mi; 2,663 km)
- Service ceiling: 28,000 ft (8,500 m)
- Rate of climb: 1,560 ft/min (7.9 m/s)

== See also ==
Related development

- Fokker F27
- Fokker 50

Aircraft of comparable role, configuration, and era

- Antonov An-24
- Handley Page Herald
- Hawker Siddeley HS.748
- NAMC YS-11

Related lists

- List of military aircraft of the United States
- List of military transport aircraft
