= Paisano =

Paisano may refer to:

== Places in the United States ==
=== Arizona ===
- Casa Juan Paisano, a historic house in Tucson

=== Texas ===
- Paisano Grant, one of twenty-five land grants made in the Brooks County/Jim Wells County area
- Paisano Park, Texas, a census-designated place in San Patricio County
- El Paisano Hotel, a historic hotel in Marfa
- El Paisano Ranch, a ranch in Jim Wells County
- Edgewater-Paisano, Texas, a suburb of Mathis

== Other uses ==
- The Paisano, an independent student-run newspaper of the University of Texas at San Antonio
- Edna Paisano (1948–2014), Nez Perce and Laguna Pueblo demographer and statistician
- Sphodros paisano, a species of purseweb spider in the family Atypidae
- Ue... paisano!, a 1953 Argentine film
- Paisano Productions, producer of Perry Mason (1957 TV series)

== See also ==
- Paisan, a 1946 Italian neorealist war drama film
