= SADM =

SADM may refer to:

- Special Atomic Demolition Munition
- Morón Airport and Air Base, ICAO code: SADM
