= Monmouth Airlines =

Defunct American commuter airline (1966–1981)

- Timetable of October 1968, showing a Beechcraft 99
| IATA | ICAO | Call sign |
|---|---|---|
| VM | — | — |
- Founded: 1966 (incorporated May 1968)
- Commenced operations: November 21, 1966
- Ceased operations: 1981
- Operating bases: Monmouth County Airport (now Monmouth Executive Airport, KBLM), Wall Township, New Jersey
- Headquarters: Wall Township, New Jersey; New Haven, Connecticut (1979–1981)
- Key people: Edward I. Brown (founder; president to 1979); Albert J. Beiga (general manager; president 1980–1981); Charles A. Robertson (president 1979–1980)

Monmouth Airlines, from 1979 Ocean Airways, was an American commuter airline based at Monmouth County Airport (now Monmouth Executive Airport) in Wall Township, New Jersey. It began scheduled flights in November 1966 as a division of the airport, whose owner, Edward I. Brown, made it a separate company in 1968 and sold shares in it to the public at the end of that year. Flying mainly Beechcraft 99 turboprops, it linked the Jersey Shore with Washington, New York and Boston and, for some years, with several cities in Pennsylvania. A separate company that Brown also ran, Vero Monmouth Airlines, flew from Vero Beach, Florida, from 1973 to 1975.

New investors renamed the company Ocean Airways in 1979 and extended it to Atlantic City and then, in 1980, to Georgia and Alabama. It filed for Chapter 11 bankruptcy protection in September 1980 and stopped flying in 1981.

== History ==
=== Origins (1966–1968) ===
Edward I. Brown, who had built Monmouth County Airport on a former gravel pit and opened it after World War II, ran charter flights from it and in 1956 began an air taxi service to Newark and Kennedy airports. On November 15, 1966, he announced that scheduled flights would begin on November 21 to Kennedy, Newark and LaGuardia airports and to Bridgeport, Connecticut, operated by the Monmouth Air Taxi Company, a division of the airport. He planned 34 flights a week, most of them flown by a four-engined de Havilland Heron carrying 15 passengers and a crew of two, with twin-engined airplanes on flights with few bookings. The Asbury Park Press described it as the county's first scheduled airline service since Allegheny Airlines had left the airport in 1956. By January 1967 the service was being called Monmouth Airlines.

Flights to Washington National Airport began on March 6, 1967, at first with 20 a week. Congressman James J. Howard was among the passengers on a press flight in the Heron on March 14. On May 1 the airline added what it called a shuttle, with an airplane available every hour for the New York airports.

=== Incorporation and public offering (1968–1969) ===
In May 1968 Brown organized the business as a corporation, Monmouth Airlines, Inc., which took over the scheduled and charter flights and the airport's flight school. Brown was president; Albert J. Beiga, the general manager, and Allen Ravin, a lawyer, were the other officers. The company ordered two 15-passenger Beechcraft 99 turboprops, which with their equipment cost more than $1 million, and put the first into service on July 22, 1968, on 14 flights a day to Washington and to Hanscom Field in Bedford, Massachusetts, which it used for Boston. Flights to Philadelphia International Airport followed on September 16, and flights between Philadelphia and Hanscom Field on October 14. The fleet numbered 15 aircraft by August 1968.

The company filed with the Securities and Exchange Commission in September 1968 to sell 200,000 shares to the public, leaving Brown with a little under half of the stock. The shares were sold over the counter on December 20, 1968, at $5 each. The company then had 12 aircraft and listed 54 flights a day, from Monmouth County Airport to Washington, Hanscom Field, Kennedy and Philadelphia and between Philadelphia, Hanscom Field and Washington.

=== Pennsylvania routes and mail (1969–1977) ===
On March 3, 1969, the airline began flying from Allentown–Bethlehem–Easton Airport in Pennsylvania to Kennedy, Washington and Monmouth County Airport. On April 7 it added flights from Caldwell-Wright Airport in Fairfield, New Jersey, to Washington and to Monmouth. That September it ordered a 20-passenger Swearingen Metro for delivery a year later; its fleet of 15 then included three Beechcraft 99s, two Piper Navajos and a Britten-Norman Islander. A flight between Wilkes-Barre/Scranton Airport and Kennedy was added on March 30, 1970, and flights from Olmsted Airport near Harrisburg to Kennedy and Washington on December 9. Service between Monmouth and Newark, dropped when landing fees rose, resumed on April 5, 1971, the day the airline began flying between Morristown Municipal Airport and Newark.

Revenue for the fiscal year 1969–70 rose 90 percent to $869,192, and the net loss fell to $132,800 from $349,457 the year before. In 1971 the airline was carrying about 1,200 passengers a month to and from Washington and up to 900 to and from Kennedy.

The airline also carried mail. In 1970 the Civil Aeronautics Board proposed a rate for it to fly mail between Philadelphia and Pittsburgh in Beechcraft 99s. By 1974 its crews were flying mail at night from Scranton by way of Allentown to Newark, in an airplane that carried commuters by day and had its seats taken out each evening. The mail flights ended late in 1978, after eight years, when the Postal Service cut its budget.

A Beechcraft 99 flying from Wilkes-Barre/Scranton to Allentown crashed on Blue Mountain on October 24, 1971, killing four of the eight people on board (see Accidents and incidents).

=== Vero Monmouth Airlines (1972–1975) ===
In August 1972 the airport commission of Vero Beach, Florida, approved a lease of counter space at Vero Beach Municipal Airport to Monmouth Airlines, which then proposed a charter service. Eastern Air Lines was about to end its service to the city, and in November Brown said that he would replace its flights under the name Vero Monmouth Airlines. The first flight, to Tampa, was scheduled for January 13, 1973, the day after Eastern's last. By the end of March there were four flights a day to Miami and Tampa, flown by a 16-seat Heron and by Piper Aztec and Seneca twins. By August the airline was flying daily to Tampa, Miami and Melbourne and weekly to Orlando, and owned two Douglas DC-3s. Brown described it in 1975 as a Florida corporation and a business separate from Monmouth Airlines.

In May 1974 Brown said that he would close the airline on June 1 because it could not afford the statistical reports that the Florida Public Service Commission required of it; in June the commission approved a $1 increase in its fares, and the flights continued. In April 1975, after the airline cut its schedule and dropped its Miami flight, the city manager ordered it to leave the terminal by May 15, saying that service had been downgraded and that the rent was regularly late. The airline stopped flying on April 30, 1975. It took the terminal's ticket counter with it; the city said that the counter was city property, and Brown said that he had bought it from Eastern. At the end it had been flying three times a day to Tampa, twice a day to Orlando and once a week to Miami.

=== Decline and reorganization (1975–1979) ===
Schedule card of about 1977, listing the Boston and Washington flights

The airline had left Allentown by 1976, when it arranged to return there on a month-to-month basis, and it ended its Wilkes-Barre/Scranton–Kennedy flights on September 12, 1977, for economic reasons. It carried 40,313 passengers in 1974 and 17,452 in 1978, a fall that the company attributed largely to dropping unprofitable service to three Pennsylvania cities. By 1979 it flew only from Monmouth County Airport to Washington and Boston, had lost money in three of the previous four years and owed $942,000.

In March 1979 the company's lawyer announced a financial reorganization in which a group of private investors would put in $250,000 to begin with, in return for the right to buy control. The airline then had one turboprop and two piston-engined airplanes, and Brown was to remain a director.

The Tax Court of New Jersey ruled in 1980 that the aircraft, parts and equipment that the airline had bought or rented between 1969 and 1976 were subject to the state's sales and use tax, and that the tax was not an unconstitutional burden on interstate commerce.

=== Ocean Airways (1979–1981) ===
An Ocean Airways Beechcraft 99 at Washington National Airport in November 1979

In May 1979 the stockholders voted to rename the company Ocean Airways, Inc., and elected a new board. Charles A. Robertson, the president of American Cruise Lines, became its president and principal owner, and Brown gave up his office in the company. From July 1, 1979, Ocean flew between Monmouth County Airport, which its timetables called Asbury Park, Atlantic City, Baltimore, Washington and New Haven, counting on traffic to the Atlantic City casinos. A sale of preferred stock and warrants on September 10, 1979, raised about $3.6 million. The company moved its headquarters to New Haven, bought two 50-seat Convair 440s that November and began flying between Newark and Washington.

On January 12, 1980, Ocean took over the routes from Atlanta to Macon and St. Simons Island, Georgia, of Air South, a financially troubled commuter airline that was part of Florida Airlines, and bought Air South's five Martin 4-0-4s. Robertson resigned as president in June. Ocean left Macon on June 23 and began flying between Montgomery, Alabama, and Atlanta on July 21; on September 22 it suspended all of its flights in the South, citing its finances.

The company filed for Chapter 11 protection in September 1980. Under Beiga, now its president, it kept four round trips each weekday between Monmouth County Airport and Washington, most of them stopping at Atlantic City. A former officer of the company said in 1982 that it had ceased operations at Monmouth County Airport on March 31, 1981; Colgan Airways took over the Washington route, and the company's aircraft were sold. In 1983 Regent Air, a new luxury airline, agreed to acquire the defunct company, which had come out of bankruptcy with almost no assets, for Regent stock valued at $2.4 million.

== Destinations ==
Contemporary reports and the airline's timetables show scheduled service to the following places. The years are those reported for the start and end of service; where no report of the end was found, the cell is blank.

Scheduled destinations of Monmouth Airlines, Ocean Airways and Vero Monmouth Airlines
| State | City | Airport | Began | Ended | Refs |
|---|---|---|---|---|---|
| New Jersey | Wall Township | Monmouth County Airport (base) | 1966 | 1981 | |
| New Jersey | Newark | Newark Airport | 1966 | | |
| New Jersey | Fairfield | Caldwell-Wright Airport | 1969 | | |
| New Jersey | Morristown | Morristown Municipal Airport | 1971 | | |
| New Jersey | Atlantic City | Atlantic City Airport, Pomona | 1979 | 1981 | |
| New York | New York | Kennedy International Airport | 1966 | | |
| Connecticut | Bridgeport | Bridgeport Airport | 1966 | | |
| Connecticut | New Haven | Tweed New Haven Airport | 1979 | | |
| District of Columbia | Washington | Washington National Airport | 1967 | 1981 | |
| Massachusetts | Bedford (for Boston) | Hanscom Field | 1968 | 1979 | |
| Pennsylvania | Philadelphia | Philadelphia International Airport | 1968 | | |
| Pennsylvania | Allentown | Allentown–Bethlehem–Easton Airport | 1969 | | |
| Pennsylvania | Wilkes-Barre and Scranton | Wilkes-Barre/Scranton Airport | 1970 | 1977 | |
| Pennsylvania | Harrisburg | Olmsted Airport | 1970 | | |
| Maryland | Baltimore | Baltimore/Washington International Airport | 1979 | | |
| Georgia | Atlanta | Hartsfield Atlanta International Airport | 1980 | 1980 | |
| Georgia | Macon | Macon Municipal Airport | 1980 | 1980 | |
| Georgia | St. Simons Island | Malcolm McKinnon Airport | 1980 | 1980 | |
| Alabama | Montgomery | Dannelly Field | 1980 | 1980 | |
| Florida (Vero Monmouth) | Vero Beach | Vero Beach Municipal Airport (base) | 1973 | 1975 | |
| Florida (Vero Monmouth) | Tampa | Tampa International Airport | 1973 | 1975 | |
| Florida (Vero Monmouth) | Miami | Miami International Airport | 1973 | 1975 | |
| Florida (Vero Monmouth) | Melbourne | Melbourne Airport | 1973 | | |
| Florida (Vero Monmouth) | Orlando | Herndon Airport | 1973 | 1975 | |

== Fleet ==
Aircraft types reported in service
| Aircraft | Notes | Refs |
|---|---|---|
| de Havilland Heron | Four-engined, 15 or 16 passengers; opened the scheduled service in 1966, and one flew for Vero Monmouth in 1973 | |
| Piper PA-31 Navajo | On the Washington route from 1967; two in the fleet in 1969 | |
| Beechcraft 99 | 15 passengers; first in service July 1968, three by 1969; still flying the Washington route for Ocean Airways in 1980 | |
| Britten-Norman BN-2 Islander | One in 1969 | |
| Piper Apache and Aztec, Piper PA-34 Seneca | Light twins; the Aztec and Seneca flew for Vero Monmouth | |
| Douglas DC-3 | Two owned by Vero Monmouth in 1973 | |
| Convair 440 | Two bought by Ocean Airways in November 1979 | |
| Martin 4-0-4 | Five bought from Air South in January 1980 | |

== Accidents and incidents ==
- On June 6, 1967, the nose wheel of a Piper Navajo collapsed as it taxied after landing at Washington National Airport on a flight from Monmouth County Airport. The four people on board, among them Brown, who was the pilot, were not hurt.
- On October 24, 1971, Flight 98, a Beechcraft 99 registered N986MA, struck the ridge of Blue Mountain near Delps, north of Allentown, at an elevation of about 1,540 feet while approaching Allentown–Bethlehem–Easton Airport at night in instrument conditions. The flight had come from Kennedy by way of Wilkes-Barre/Scranton. Both pilots and two of the six passengers were killed, and the other four passengers were seriously injured. The National Transportation Safety Board found the probable cause to be the pilot's failure to follow the approved procedures for a non-precision instrument approach, and found it highly probable that long hours on duty and in instrument flight had fatigued the pilots. During the investigation the board warned that pilots could confuse two similarly named approach charts for the Allentown area and asked the Federal Aviation Administration to mark them. Three of the survivors sued the airline and settled out of court. In October 1977 members of the Allentown Hiking Club carried the wreckage, which lay near the Appalachian Trail, off the mountain.
- On August 14, 1974, an airplane flown by a student pilot on her first solo flight went out of control at Vero Beach Municipal Airport and struck two parked Piper Aztecs of Vero Monmouth Airlines, destroying one. No one was seriously hurt.
- On May 3, 1977, a flight from Kennedy to Wilkes-Barre/Scranton returned to Kennedy five minutes after takeoff when a warning light showed an engine fire. The five passengers and two crew members were unhurt; Brown said that the warning device had malfunctioned.
- On October 29, 1980, Ocean Airways Flight 39, a Beechcraft 99 arriving from Washington with eight people on board, struck a deer on the runway at Atlantic City Airport. The nose landing gear collapsed; no one was injured.

== See also ==
- List of defunct airlines of the United States (J–P)
