= Air South (Georgia) =

US airline

IATA	ICAO	Call sign
KQ	—	—
- Founded: 1969; 57 years ago
- Ceased operations: 1978; 48 years ago
- Operating bases: Atlanta Municipal Airport
- Headquarters: St. Simons, Georgia
- Key people: David Starr

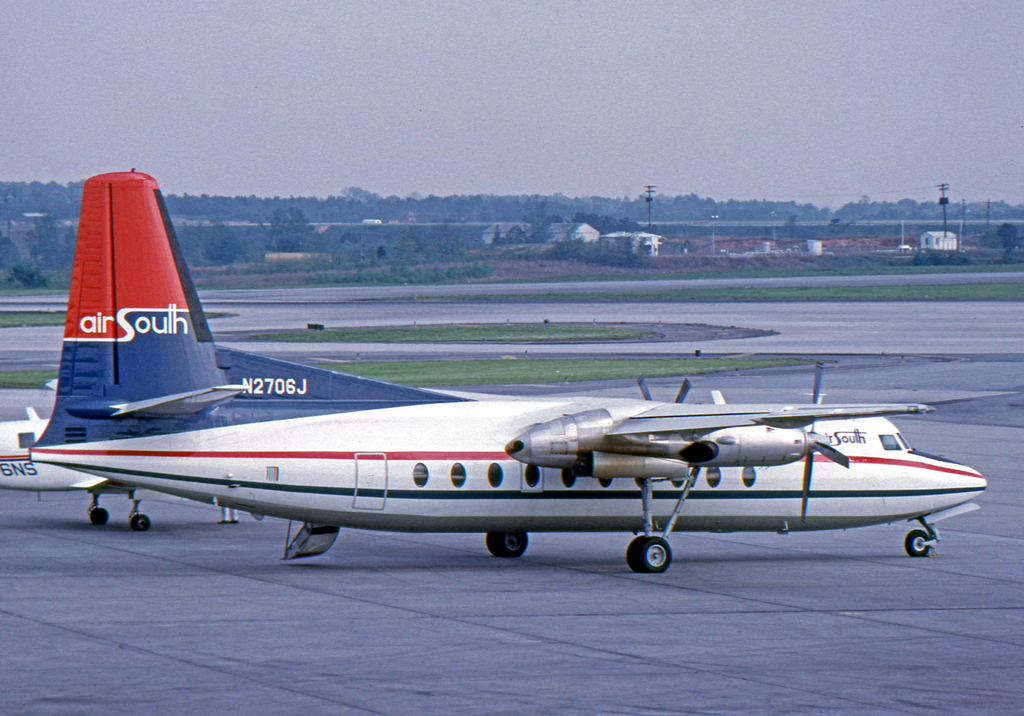
An Air South Fairchild F-27 at Atlanta Municipal Airport (1974).

Air South was an airline from the United States. Founded as Nationwide Airlines Southeast in 1969, the company had its headquarters at Malcom McKinnon Airport on St. Simons Island, Georgia. Out of its base at Atlanta Municipal Airport, Air South operated regional scheduled passenger flights within the southeastern US, using a small fleet of Fairchild F-27 and Martin 4-0-4 aircraft, as well as the Beechcraft Model 99.

In 1975, Air South was acquired by Florida Airlines and became a wholly owned subsidiary, along with Shawnee Airlines. Over the following years, Air South continued flight operations under its own branding. As a consequence of the Airline Deregulation Act, it was eventually shut down in 1978. Florida Airlines then operated as Florida Airlines and Air South until 1981. In January 1980 Ocean Airways, a New Jersey commuter airline, took over Air South's remaining Atlanta–Macon and Atlanta–St. Simons Island routes and bought its five Martin 4-0-4s.

== Route network ==
In the early 1970s, Air South offered a network of domestic flights to the following destinations:

Location	State	Airport
Birmingham	Alabama	Birmingham Municipal Airport
Americus	Georgia	Souther Field
Atlanta	Georgia	Atlanta Municipal Airport (base)
Dublin	Georgia
Statesboro	Georgia	Statesboro-Bulloch County Airport
Saint Simons	Georgia	Malcolm McKinnon Airport
Thomasville	Georgia
Tifton	Georgia	Henry Tift Myers Airport
Waycross	Georgia	Waycross-Ware County Airport
Beaufort	South Carolina	Beaufort County Airport
Hilton Head	South Carolina	Hilton Head Airport
Nashville	Tennessee	Nashville Airport

== Accidents and incidents ==
- On 6 July 1969, the twelve passengers and two pilots of Air South Flight 168 died when the aircraft, a Beechcraft Model 99 (registered N844NS), crashed 10 kilometers northwest of Monroe, Georgia at 21:22 local time. Investigation into the accident revealed that the airplane had been at cruise level during a flight from Atlanta to Greenville/Spartanburg in South Carolina, when it went into an unwanted high speed nose-down dive. Because of the extreme pulling forces when they tried to regain control, both pilots were likely incapacitated so that the plane couldn't be maneuvered anymore.
- On 31 March 1974, another Air South Beech 99 (registered N848NS) was destroyed when a fire broke out during taxiing at Malcolm McKinnon Airport. The two pilots and both passengers who planned to fly to Atlanta escaped before the airplane was engulfed by the flames.

== Fleet ==
- ? Beechcraft 99
- 3 Fairchild F-27 (N2704J, N2705J, N2706J)
- 1 Martin 4-0-4 (N258D)

== See also ==
- List of defunct airlines of the United States
