= Aeronor Chile =

Airline from Chile

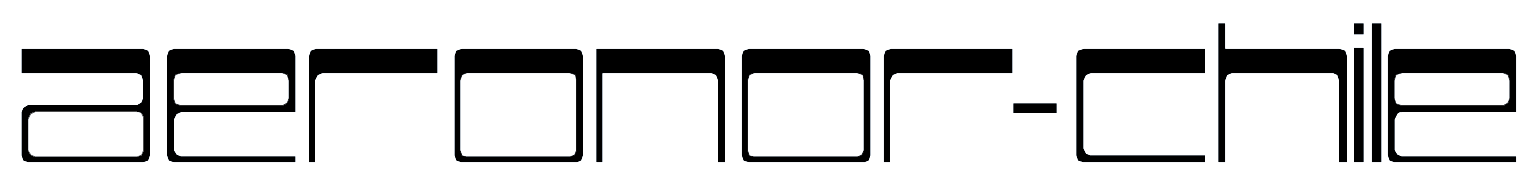

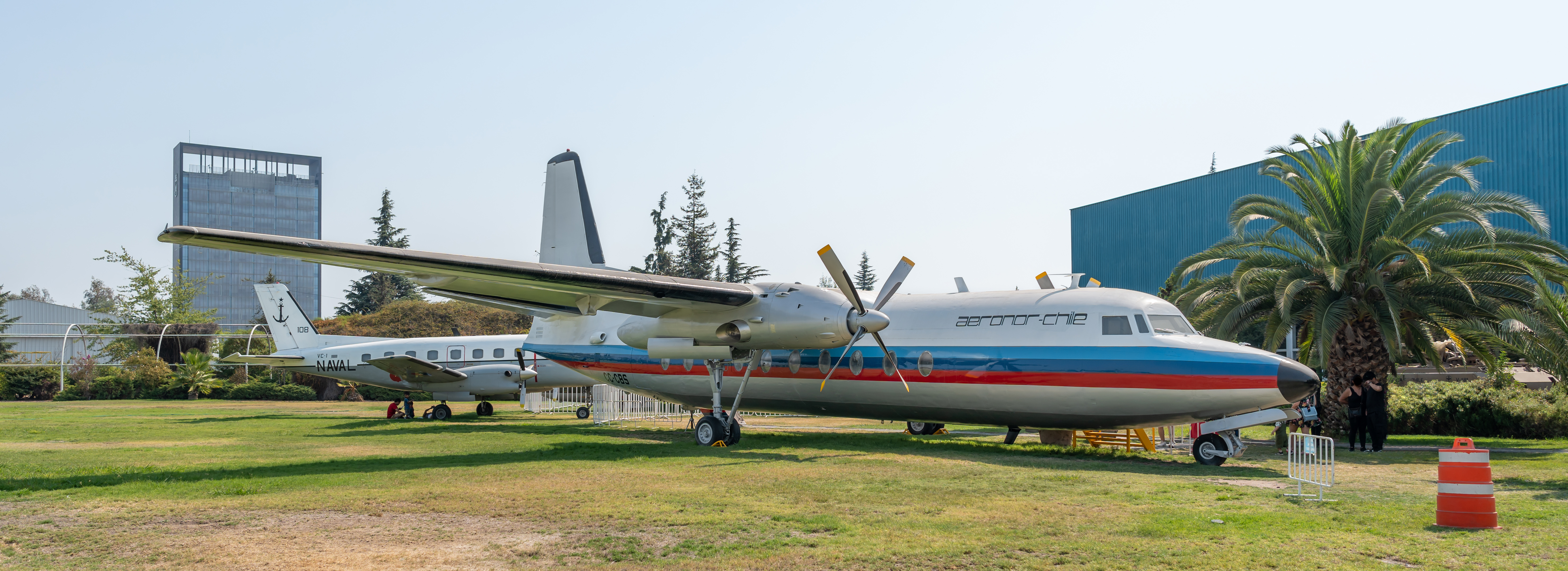
- Aeronor Chile F 27
IATA	ICAO	Call sign
-	ANS	AERONOR
- Founded: June 30, 1976
- Commenced operations: 1978
- Ceased operations: 1986
- Fleet size: 6
- Destinations: 9
- Parent company: Copesa
- Key people: Germán Picó Domínguez, Óscar Erlandsen
- Employees: 70

Aeronor-Chile was a Chilean airline company. The airline was owned by another enterprise, named Copesa, which also owns the Chilean newspaper, La Tercera. Aeronor's founding coincided with various other Chilean airlines that came up during the 1970s. Aeronor Chile went bankrupt 4 years after the crash of flight 304 in La Serena. One of its aircraft is currently on display. One Aeronor Chile F 27 had a special livery which the tail was painted with various colours.

== History ==
Aeronor was founded on June 30, 1976, as Transportes Aéreos Norte-Sur y Cía. Ltda. Notable shareholders included Óscar Erlandsen Le Fort, Alberto Spoerer Covarrubias, Patricia Valenzuela Silverstein, Roberto Zúñiga Peñailillo, and Eduardo Bonilla Menchaca among others. Aeronor initially owned 3 F 27 aircraft. Officially beginning as Aero Norte-Sur in 1978, Aeronor was one of the earlier Chilean airlines among Línea Aérea Iquiqueña, Fast Air Carrier and Aeroguayacán. Aero Norte-Sur, in February 1978, initially owned 3 F 27 aircraft and was responsible for delivering newspapers. Aeronor Chile was among the new carriers in Chile that came about in the 1970s. By 1981, Aeronor had a total of 6 F 27 aircraft, one of which would later be sold to TAC, while two were destroyed in accidents in 1979 and 1982.

In 1982, Aeronor Chile suffered its worst air disaster, after Aeronor flight 304 crashed in La Serena due to an engine malfunction, which ended up killing 46 people. During this time, Óscar Erlandsen was the general management director and Germán Picó Domínguez was the president of Aeronor Chile. The poor condition of its fleet, the fate of Flight 304, and competition led to Aeronor Chile ceasing to exist in 1986.

== Fleet ==
- Fairchild F-27A
- Fairchild F 27 J
- PA 31
- Metroliner III

== Destinations ==
Aeronor only operated scheduled services domestically, alone Aeronor operated to a total of 9 cities in Chile,

- Arica - Chacalluta International Airport
- Iquique - Cavancha Airport
- Antofagasta - Cerro Moreno International Airport
- El Salvador - El Salvador Airport
- Calama - El Loa International Airport
- Copiapó - Chamonate Aerodrome
- Vallenar - Vallenar Aerodrome
- La Serena - La Florida Airport
- Santiago, Chile - Los Cerrillos Airport

== Accidents and incidents ==
- An Aeronor Fairchild F-27A on a domestic cargo flight attempted to take off from Iquique Cavancha airport in Iquique, Chile on April 20, 1979, but had to return for an emergency landing. The plane landed on its belly. None of its four occupants were reported injured.
- Aeronor Flight 304 was flying from Santiago to Antofagasta with an intermediate stop at La Serena's airport on December 9, 1982, but instead of landing at La Serena, the Fairchild F-27A crashed nearby after an engine fire, killing all 46 occupants on board, including well known reporter Silvia Pinto.
