= 1962 Avensa Fairchild F-27 accident =

1962 aviation accident

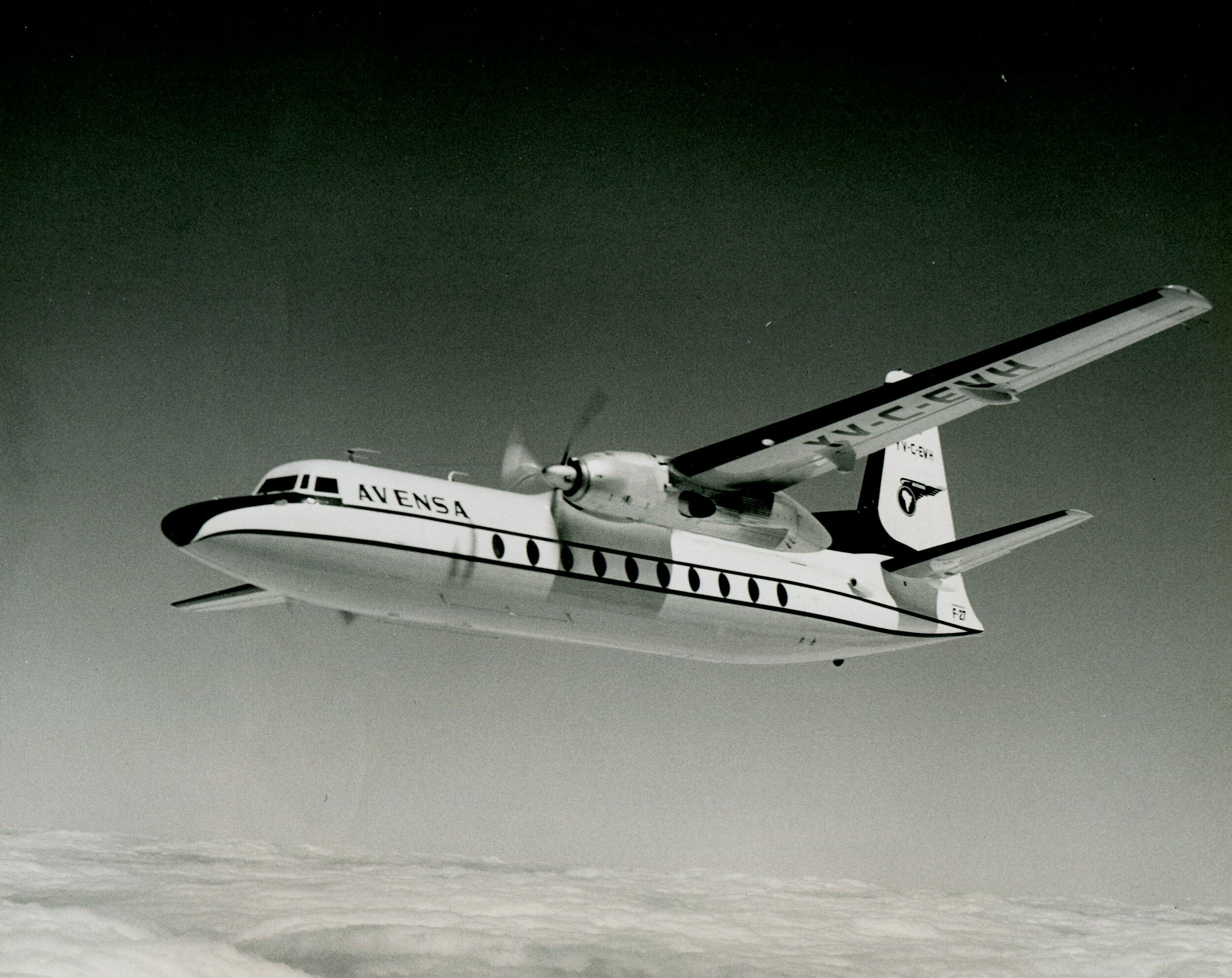
- YV-C-EVH, the aircraft involved in the crash

Accident
- Date: 25 February 1962
- Summary: Controlled flight into terrain
- Site: Margarita Island, Venezuela; 10°59′N 63°56′W

Aircraft
- Aircraft type: Fairchild F-27
- Operator: Avensa
- Registration: YV-C-EVH
- Flight origin: Porlamar Airport, Margarita Island, Venezuela
- Destination: Cumaná Airport
- Passengers: 20
- Crew: 3
- Fatalities: 23
- Injuries: 0
- Survivors: 0

The 1962 Avensa Fairchild F-27 accident occurred on 25 February 1962 when a Fairchild F-27 twin-engined turboprop airliner registered YV-C-EVH of Avensa crashed into San Juan mountain on Venezuela's Margarita Island in the Caribbean Sea. All 20 passengers and three crew were killed.

== Accident ==
The F-27 was on a scheduled flight from Porlamar Airport to Cumaná Airport, when a few minutes after departure from Portamar, the aircraft impacted San Juan Mountain and was destroyed.

== Aircraft ==
The aircraft, a Fairchild F-27 twin-engined turboprop airliner had been built in the United States in 1958 and delivered new to Avensa on 18 September 1958.
