= CATA Línea Aérea =

Argentinian airline, 1986–2006

IATA	ICAO	Call sign
-	CTZ	CATA
- Founded: 1986
- Ceased operations: 2006
- Hubs: Moron Airport
- Secondary hubs: Ministro Pistarini International Airport; Aeroparque Jorge Newbery; Almirante Marco Andrés Zar Airport; Ingeniero Aeronáutico Ambrosio L.V. Taravella International Airport
- Fleet size: 1 (at closure)
- Parent company: Grupo Pesquera ICS Argentina
- Headquarters: Buenos Aires, Argentina
- Website: http://www.cata.com.ar/ (now defunct)

CATA Línea Aérea was an airline based in Buenos Aires, Argentina. It operated domestic scheduled and chartered flights, out of its base at Moron Airport, as well as from Ministro Pistarini International Airport, Aeroparque Jorge Newbery, Almirante Marco Andrés Zar Airport, and Ingeniero Aeronáutico Ambrosio L.V. Taravella International Airport.

== History ==
The airline was established and started operations in 1986. It was wholly owned by Grupo Pesquera ICS Argentina. All flights were suspended since 2006, and bankruptcy was formally declared on March 28, 2008.

== Fleet ==
The CATA fleet included the following aircraft:

- 5 Fairchild Hiller FH-227
- 1 IAI Arava

== Accidents and incidents ==
- On 26 October 2003, Fairchild FH-227 LV-MGV crashed SW of Buenos Aires, Argentina. All 5 occupants died and the aircraft was totally destroyed. The flight crew had miscalculated the airplane's take-off weight, leading to an engine shutting down after take-off.
