= Aeronor Chile Flight 304 =

1982 aviation accident

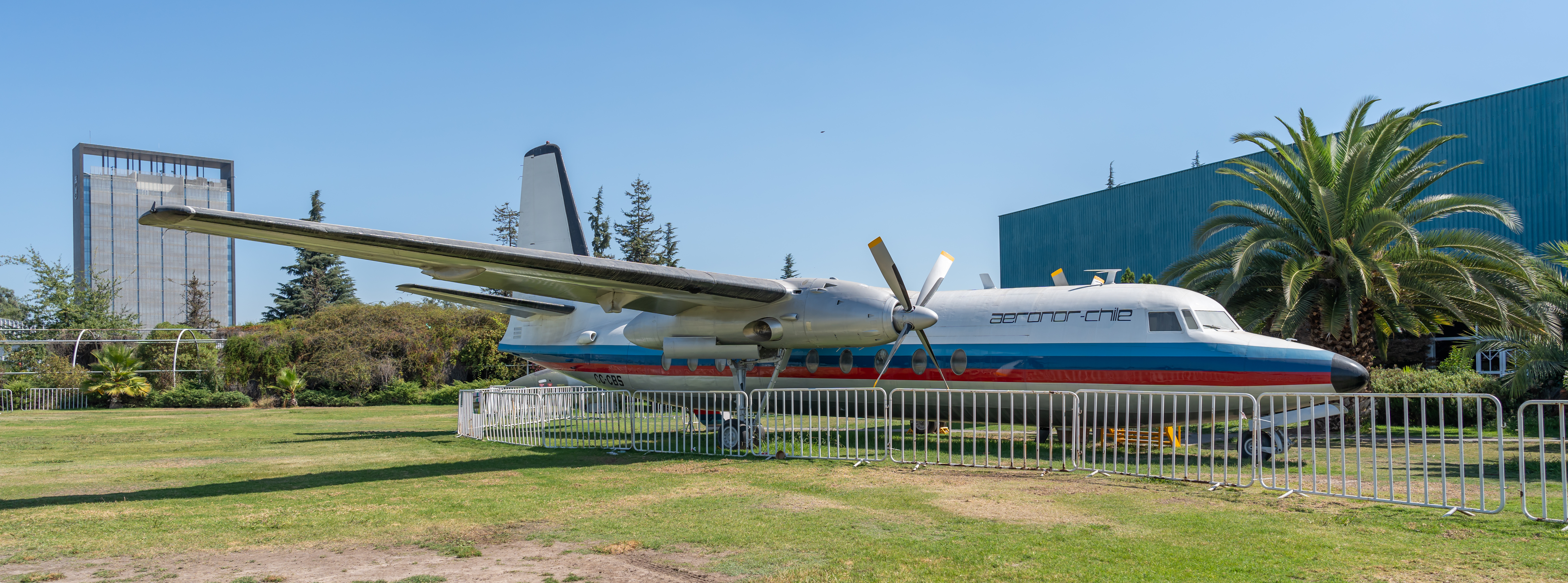
- A Fairchild F-27 similar to the accident aircraft

Accident
- Date: December 9, 1982
- Summary: Engine failure
- Site: Near La Florida Airport, La Serena; 29°54′17″S 71°12′55″W

Aircraft
- Aircraft type: Fairchild F-27
- Operator: Aeronor Chile
- Registration: CC-CJE
- Flight origin: Los Cerrillos Airport, Santiago, Chile
- Stopover: La Florida Airport, La Serena
- 2nd stopover: Desierto de Atacama Airport, Copiapó
- Destination: Cerro Moreno International Airport, Antofagasta
- Passengers: 42
- Crew: 4
- Fatalities: 46
- Survivors: 0

Aeronor Chile Flight 304 was a Chilean domestic flight operated by Aeronor Chile between the cities of Santiago and Antofagasta with two intermediate stops in La Serena and Copiapó. On December 9, 1982, the Fairchild F-27 operating the flight crashed near La Florida Airport in La Serena. All 46 passengers and crew on board died.

== Accident ==
The Fairchild F-27 of Aeronor Chile was flying from Santiago to Antofagasta, with stops in La Serena and Copiapó.

The aircraft took off from Santiago at 09:40 (UTC−4), reaching the city of La Serena at 10:25. A few minutes before it was scheduled to land at La Florida Airport, the aircraft suffered a malfunction in one of its engines. After this, at 10:29, it crashed into a stone wall, in other sources named a mountain slope, located in an area called "Parcela Seis" (Lot Six) at Alfalfares, located approximately 800 meters northeast of the airport terminal. After the aircraft crashed, it caught fire and was almost completely burnt. It is estimated that the aircraft crashed at a speed of 180 km/h. All forty-two passengers and four crew members were killed by the crash or subsequent fire.

Initially, the accident was mistaken for an emergency drill at the airport in La Serena which had commenced a few hours before the tragedy. A television crew from Canal 8 UCV TV, who were shooting scenes of the drill, managed to capture the Aeronor aircraft on fire shortly after the crash.

The pilot of the aircraft was the CEO of Aeronor Chile.

== Notable victims ==
- Silvia Pinto, a well known news reporter.
