= Montgomery Regional Airport =

Airport in Alabama, United States

Montgomery Regional Airport Dannelly Field

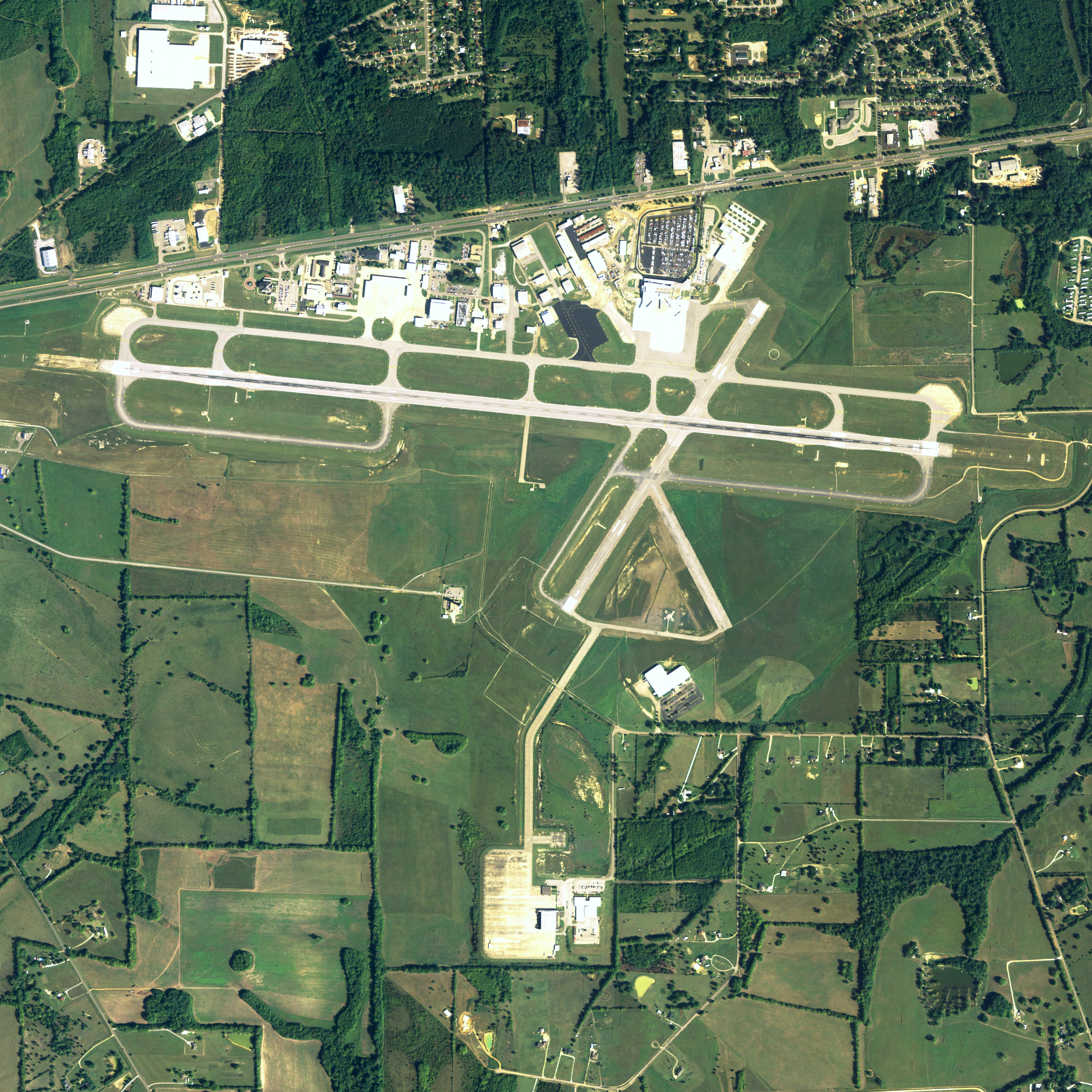
- NAIP 2006 orthophoto
- IATA: MGM; ICAO: KMGM; FAA LID: MGM; WMO: 72226

Summary
- Airport type: Public/Military
- Owner: City of Montgomery
- Operator: Montgomery Airport Authority
- Serves: Montgomery, Alabama
- Elevation AMSL: 221 ft (67 m)
- Coordinates: 32°18′02″N 086°23′38″W
- Website: flymgm.com

Map
- Location in Alabama MGM (the United States)

Runways
Direction	Length		Surface
Direction	ft	m	Surface
10/28	9,020	2,749	Asphalt
3/21	4,011	1,223	Asphalt

Helipads
Number	Length		Surface
Number	ft	m	Surface
H1	100	30	Asphalt

Statistics (2020)
- Passengers (2020): 164,680
- Aircraft operations (year ending 9/30/2022): 63,511
- Based aircraft (2022): 110
- Source: Bureau of Transportation Statistics, Federal Aviation Administration

Montgomery Regional Airport (IATA: MGM, ICAO: KMGM, FAA LID: MGM) (Dannelly Field) is a civil-military airport 7 miles (11 km) southwest of downtown Montgomery, the capital of Alabama. Owned by the Montgomery Airport Authority, it is used for general aviation and military aviation, and is serviced by three airlines.

The Federal Aviation Administration (FAA) National Plan of Integrated Airport Systems for 2017–2021 categorized it as a non-hub primary commercial service facility. Federal Aviation Administration records say the airport had 157,958 enplanements in calendar year 2013, a decrease from 182,313 in 2012. However, by 2024 boardings increased to 194,627 passenger enplanements. In 2025, MGM saw the most passengers in over twenty years.

== History ==
Commercial aviation and military aviation have been intertwined in Montgomery. The first commercial air services in Montgomery operated at Maxwell Field, a military facility founded by the Wright Brothers west of the city. To provide for commercial aviation the City of Montgomery opened its original municipal airport in 1929 east of the city. This facility was later named Gunter Field and was served by a predecessor of American Airlines. Eastern Air Lines subsequently took over service at Gunter.

In 1940 the War Department chose Gunter Field for a new pilot training facility. Gunter quickly became congested, Eastern Airlines was forced to move temporarily to Maxwell, and the city purchased a tract southwest of downtown on US 80 to replace Gunter for civilian aviation. Separately, the Army Air Forces identified a need for seven auxiliary fields in the vicinity of Gunter and the city and USAAF agreed that the city's newly purchased site would also serve as Gunter's auxiliary field #6. It opened in 1943 and was named for ENS Clarence Moore Dannelly Jr., USN, a Navy pilot killed in a 1940 training accident and considered to be the first casualty of World War II from Montgomery. The old Army Air Forces hangars are now part of the Montgomery Aviation complex. The original three runways and their original dimensions were:

- 3/21: 4,000 by 150 feet (1,219 m × 46 m). Still exists.
- 9/27: 3,500 by 150 feet (1,067 m × 46 m). Extended to 7,000 ft (2,100 m) in 1955. Extended to 9,000 ft (2,700 m) in 1963. Redesignated 10/28 in 1992.
- 15/33: 4,000 by 150 feet (1,219 m × 46 m). Closed in 1981. Some portions remain as taxiway and apron.

When Dannelly Field opened, Eastern moved its operations there. The city took title to Dannelly in 1946, although joint commercial and military use continued, and erected a permanent passenger terminal and control tower north of Runway 9/27 in 1955. While Runway 9/27 was being rebuilt in 1963, and again in 1970, commercial flights were temporarily diverted to Maxwell AFB.

== Military use ==
The Alabama Air National Guard's 187th Fighter Wing (187 FW), based on the west side of the airport at Montgomery Air National Guard Base, operates a squadron of
F-35A Lightning II aircraft. The 187th Fighter Wing evolved from the 160th Tactical Reconnaissance Squadron that began operating at Dannelly Field in 1953. During its history, the 187th and its predecessor have based several types of aircraft at Montgomery, including the RF-51 Mustang, RF-80 Shooting Star, C-131 Samaritan, RF-84 Thunderflash, RF-4 Phantom II, F-4 Phantom II and F-16 Fighting Falcon.

The Alabama Army National Guard also has an Army Aviation Support Facility on the south side of the airport. Although primarily oriented to helicopter operations, fixed-wing aircraft can also be accommodated. The 31st Aviation Battalion was established here in 1986 and became the 1st Battalion, 131st Aviation Regiment a year later.

An Air National Guard Aircraft Rescue and Fire Fighting (ARFF) unit is located at the airport, equipped with multiple fire-fighting and rescue vehicles, to augment the airport's civilian ARFF unit.

== Facilities ==
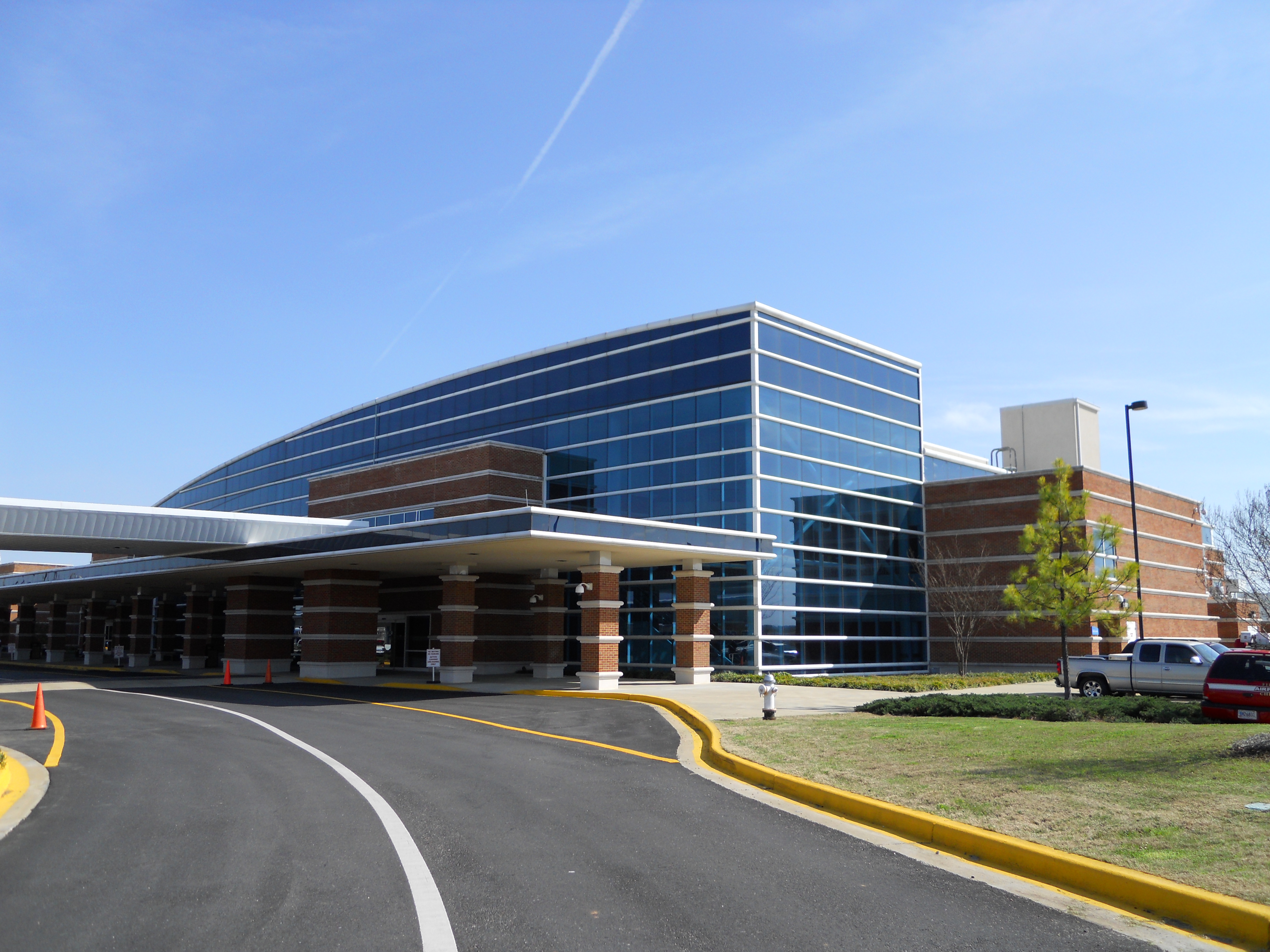
Airport terminal in 2011

Montgomery Regional Airport covers 1,907 acres (772 ha) at an elevation of 221 feet (67 m). It has two asphalt runways. Runway 10/28 is 9,020 by 150 feet (2,749 x 46 m) and has CAT I ILS and approach lights on both ends. Runway 3/21 is 4,011 by 150 feet (1,223 x 46 m). There is one asphalt helipad, 100 by 100 feet (30 x 30 m).

The airline terminal has been expanded and modified several times since 1955. A $40 million capital program that finished in November 2006 doubled the size of the terminal, transformed its appearance, and modernized it with second-floor boarding, passenger loading bridges, and a rotunda with a domed ceiling that simulates sunrises, sunsets, and stars at night.

The apron and the main runway and taxiways can accommodate aircraft as large as the Boeing 747 and Antonov 124.

There are numerous corporate aviation hangars and support facilities. A proposal to extend Runway 3/21 to 8,000 feet (2,400 m) is under consideration. A new control tower was built in 1996 south of Runway 10/28.

In the year ending September 30, 2022 the airport had 63,511 aircraft operations, average 174 per day: 35% military, 51% general aviation, 11% air taxi, and 3% airline. In September 2022, 110 aircraft were based at this airport: 32 military, 51 single-engine, 15 multi-engine, 6 jet, and 6 helicopter.

In May 2023, the airport removed all four previous jet bridges and replaced them with four new jet bridges. The airport is currently undergoing a $5,200,000 renovation that includes a brand new baggage claim area with two carousels, a new car rental area, new escalators and other aesthetic improvements.

== Airlines and destinations ==
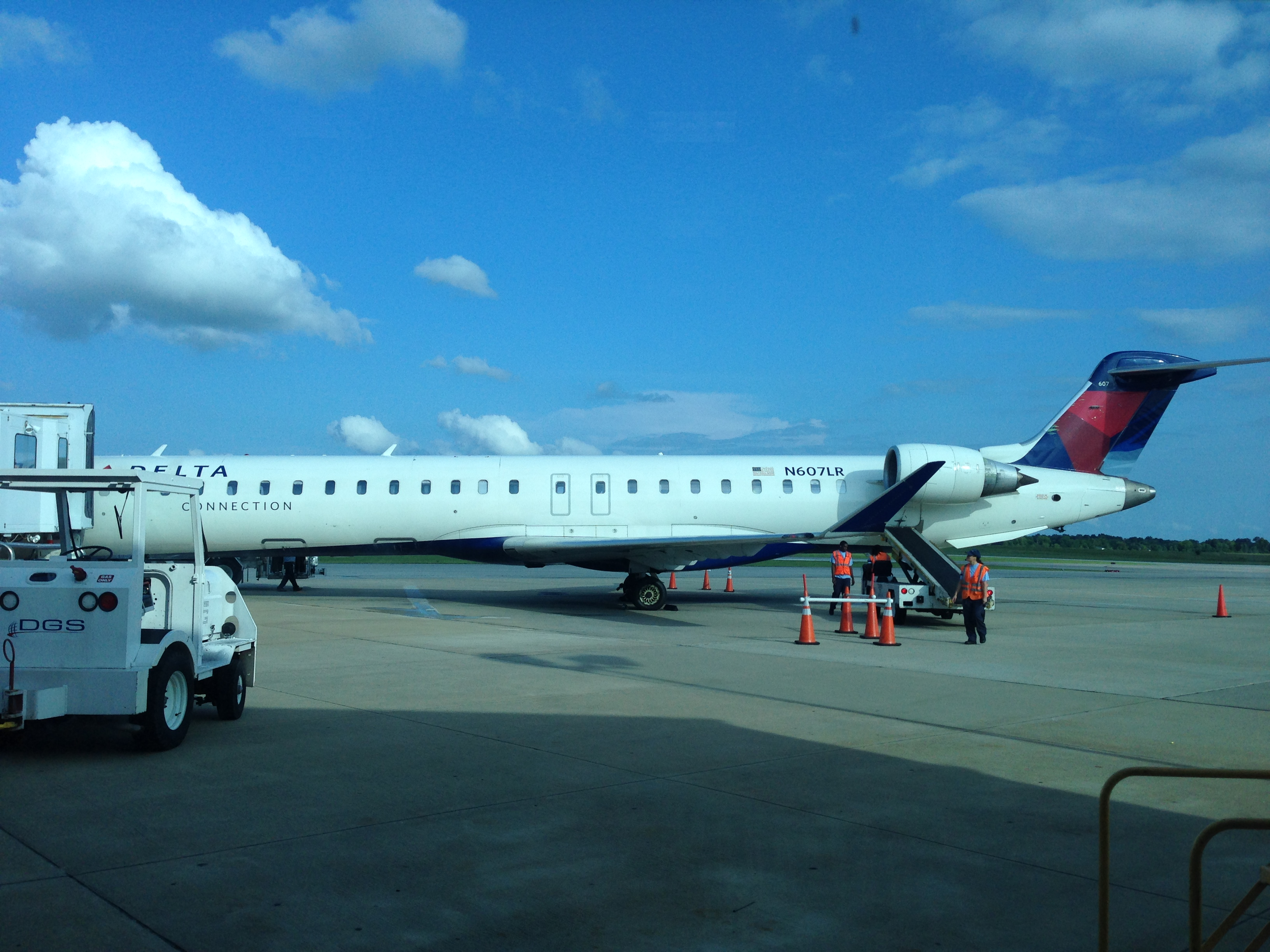
Delta Connection CRJ-900

Airlines with scheduled nonstop flights to:

Airlines	Destinations
American Eagle	Charlotte, Dallas/Fort Worth, Washington–National
Delta Connection	Atlanta
United Express	Houston–Intercontinental

Destinations map
All-year destinations from Montgomery Regional Airport

== Statistics ==
=== Top destinations ===
Busiest domestic routes from MGM (August 2025 – July 2026)
Rank	Airport	Passengers	Carriers
1	(Georgia (U.S. state)) Atlanta, Georgia	102,240	Delta
2	Dallas/Fort Worth, Texas	52,220	American
3	Charlotte, North Carolina	31,970	American
4	Washington–National, Virginia	9,490	American
5	Houston–Intercontinental, Texas	8,610	United

=== Other statistics ===
Carrier shares (August 2025 – July 2026)
Carrier	Passengers (arriving and departing)
Endeavor	181,000(44.45%)
PSA	98,610(24.26%)
Piedmont	61,990(15.25%)
SkyWest	40,940(10.07%)
Envoy	24,020(5.91%)
Other	290(0.07%)

Annual Enplanements at MGM
Year	Enplanement	Change	Year	Enplanement	Change	Year	Enplanement	Change
1999	231,061	—	2010	194,540	▲15.8%	2021	127,323	▲48.9%
2000	239,806	▲3.6%	2011	188,177	▼3.27%	2022	150,694	▲18.3%
2001	212,459	▼12.9%	2012	182,313	▼3.2%	2023	178,825	▲18.5%
2002	215,365	▲1.3%	2013	157,958	▼15.4%	2024	194,627	▲8.8%
2003	212,660	▼1.3%	2014	167,000	▲6.67%	2025	203,825	▲4.7%
2004	215,553	▲1.3%	2015	175,619	▲3.45%			
2005	203,557	▼5.9%	2016	173,210	▼1.37%			
2006	188,329	▼8.1%	2017	152,773	▼11.80%			
2007	181,231	▼3.9%	2018	170,036	▲11.3%			
2008	169,956	▼6.6%	2019	194,990	▲14.33%			
2009	163,864	▼3.7%	2020	85,498	▼56.15%			

== Former airlines and flights ==
Past airlines since 1943 have included Eastern Air Lines, Eastern Metro Express, Waterman Airlines, Southern Airways, Republic Airlines, Piedmont Aviation, Sun Airlines, Southeast Commuter Airlines, South Central Air Transport (SCAT), Air Illinois, Air South, Trans Air Express, Ocean Airways, Continental Airlines, Continental Express, Northwest Airlink, US Airways Express, and Via Airlines. 50-90 seat regional jets are now the usual airliners, but in the past airlines such as Delta scheduled the DC-9, MD-80, 737, 727, and even the DC-8.

Northwest Airlink flew to Memphis until it merged with Delta; Delta retired the route a year and a half after acquiring Northwest. Continental Express flew nonstop to Houston Intercontinental. Past Delta routes include flights to New Orleans, Jackson, Cincinnati and Dallas. Eastern flights were to Atlanta, Birmingham, Dothan, Mobile, and Pensacola. Southern/Republic flights were to Birmingham, Dothan, Panama City, Orlando, Tallahassee, and Memphis.

Prior to the merger with American in October 2015, US Airways Express flew direct to Charlotte three times daily. American Eagle continued the route after the merger.

Via Airlines flew nonstop to Orlando-Sanford from May 2018 to May 2019.

== Master plan ==
The 20-year, $98 million master plan projects enplanements to reach 245,000 a year in 2030. The plan calls for runway 3/21 to be doubled in length to 8,000 ft, and with the extension commercial airlines will be able to use it. The plan also calls for new corporate hangars.

== Accidents and incidents ==
- On February 19, 2021, an Air Force T-38 trainer from the 50th Flying Training Squadron crashed in a wooded area near the airport, killing both pilots.
- On December 31, 2022, an American Airlines ramp agent was killed due to walking too close to an active engine. She was ingested by the engine after having failed to follow standard safety procedures. An NTSB investigation found she was cognitively impaired at prior to the incident.

== Images ==
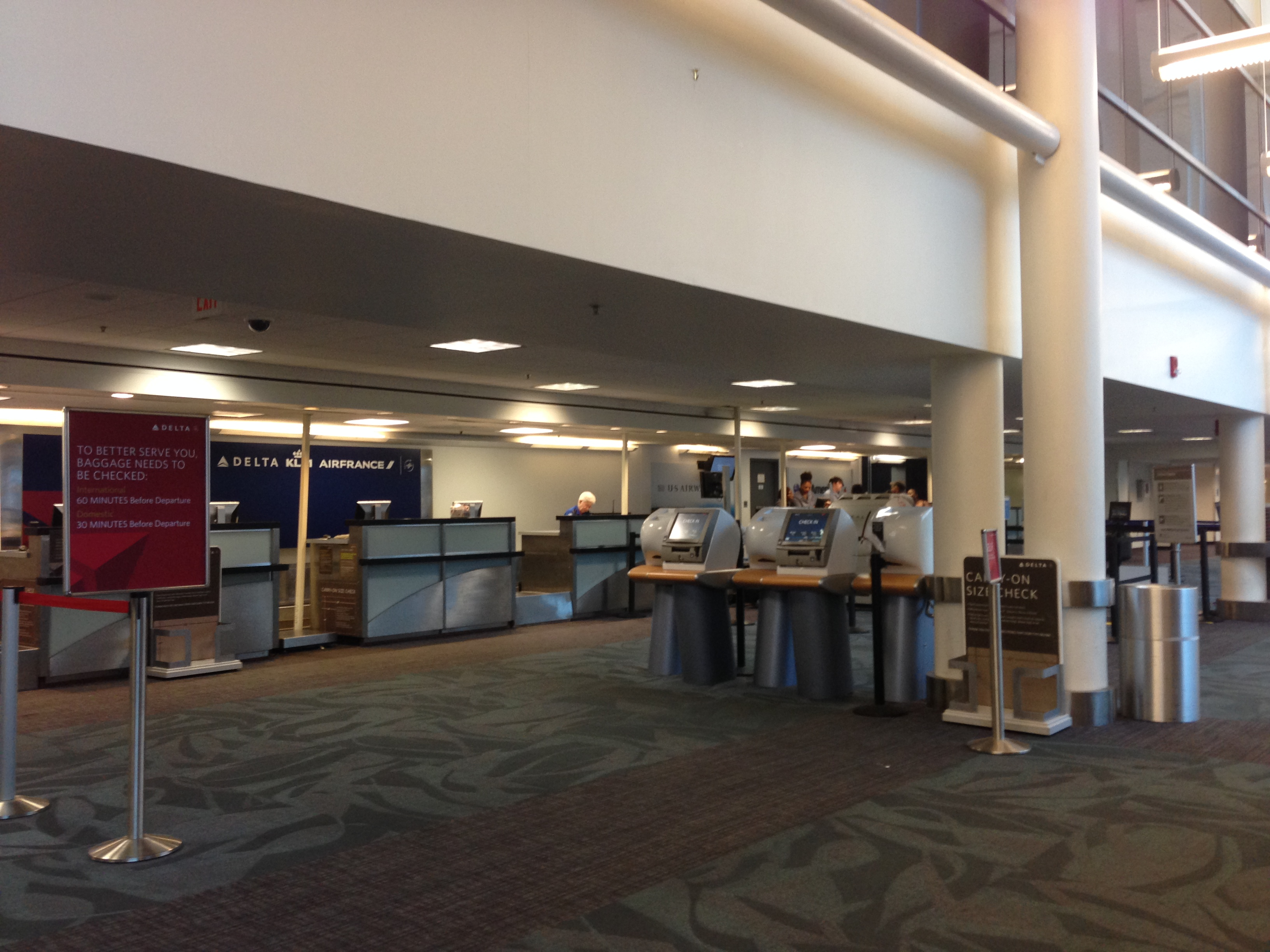
Check in counters at MGM

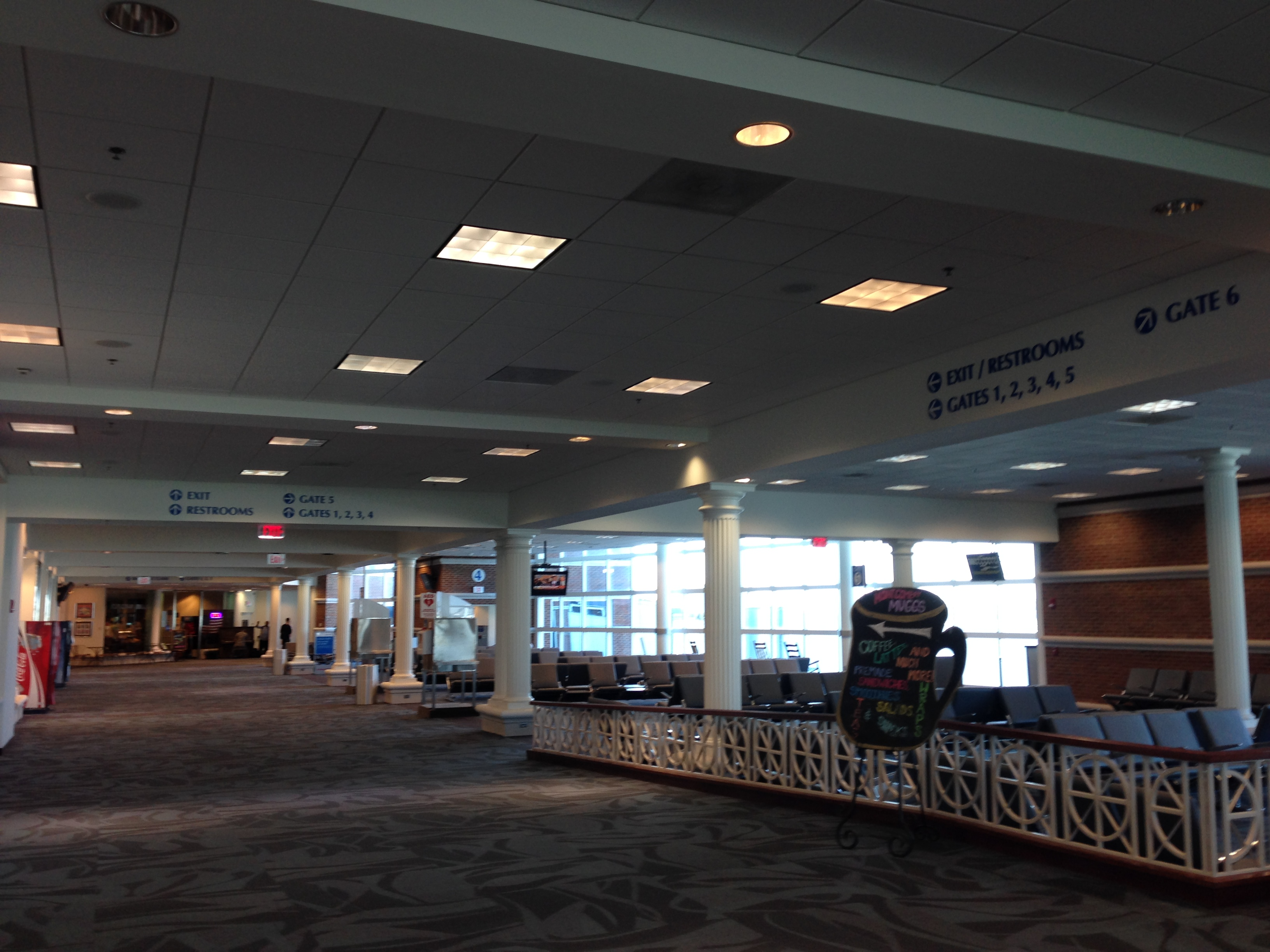
MGM gate area

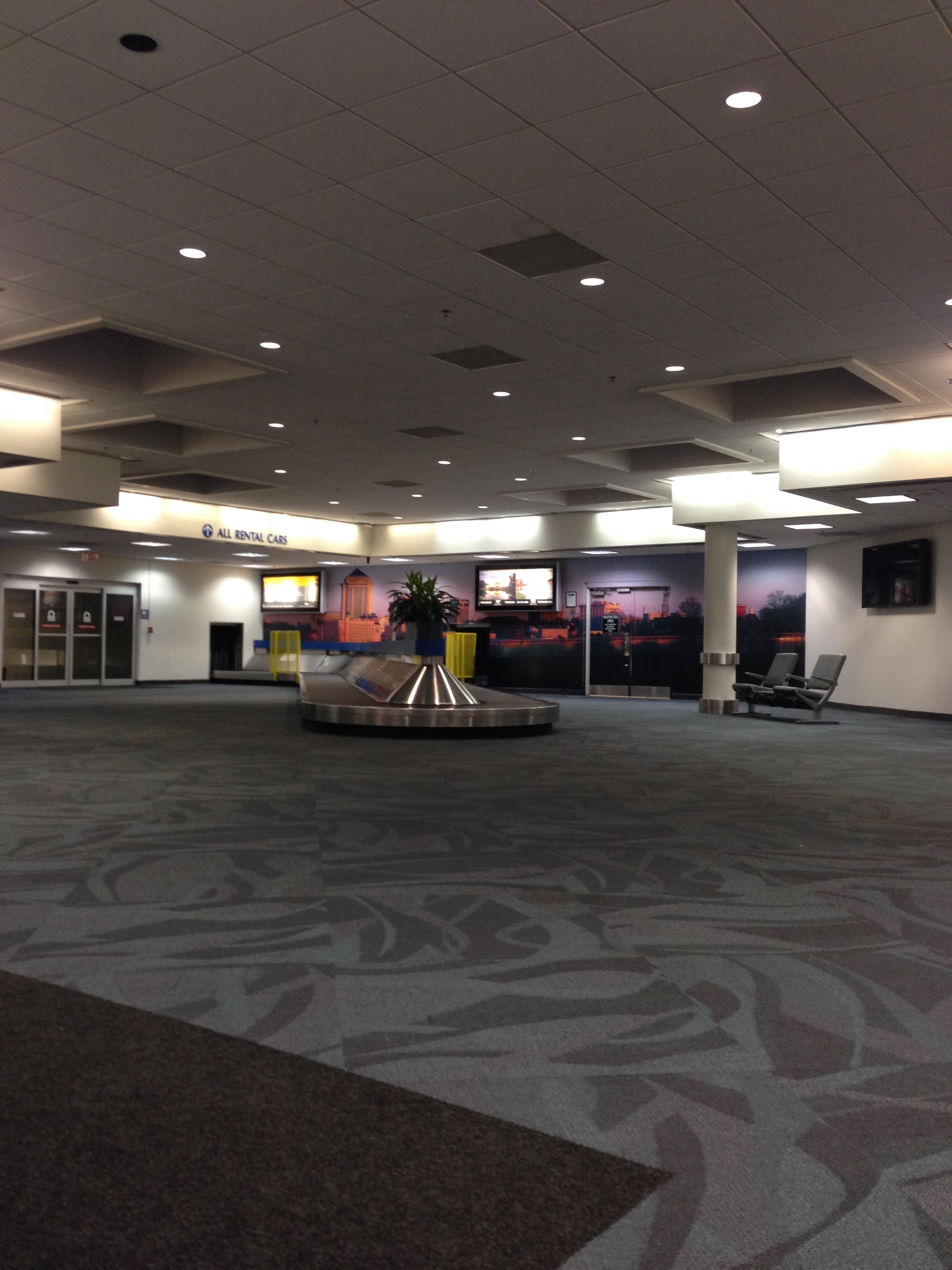
MGM baggage claim

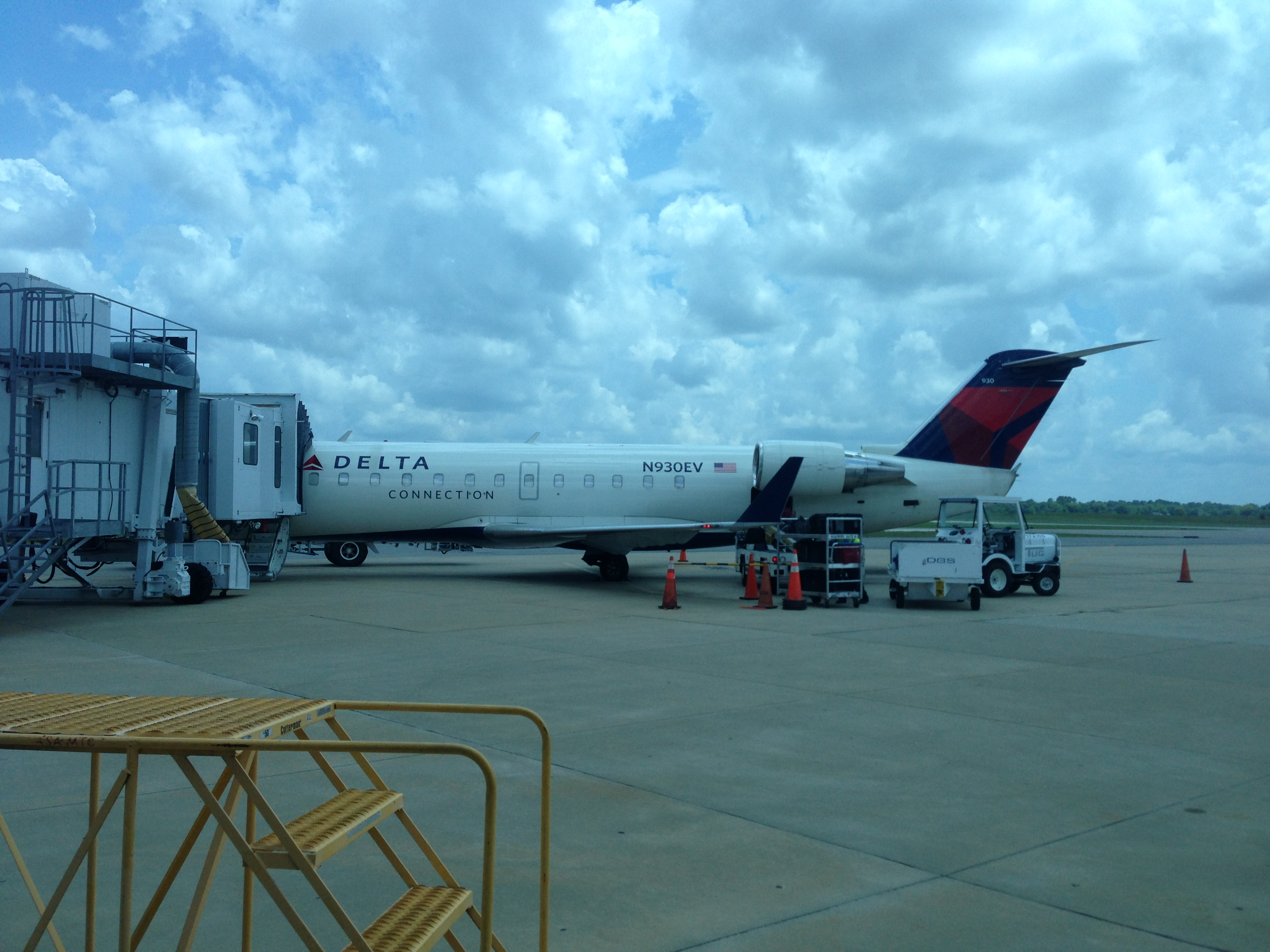
A Delta Connection CRJ-200

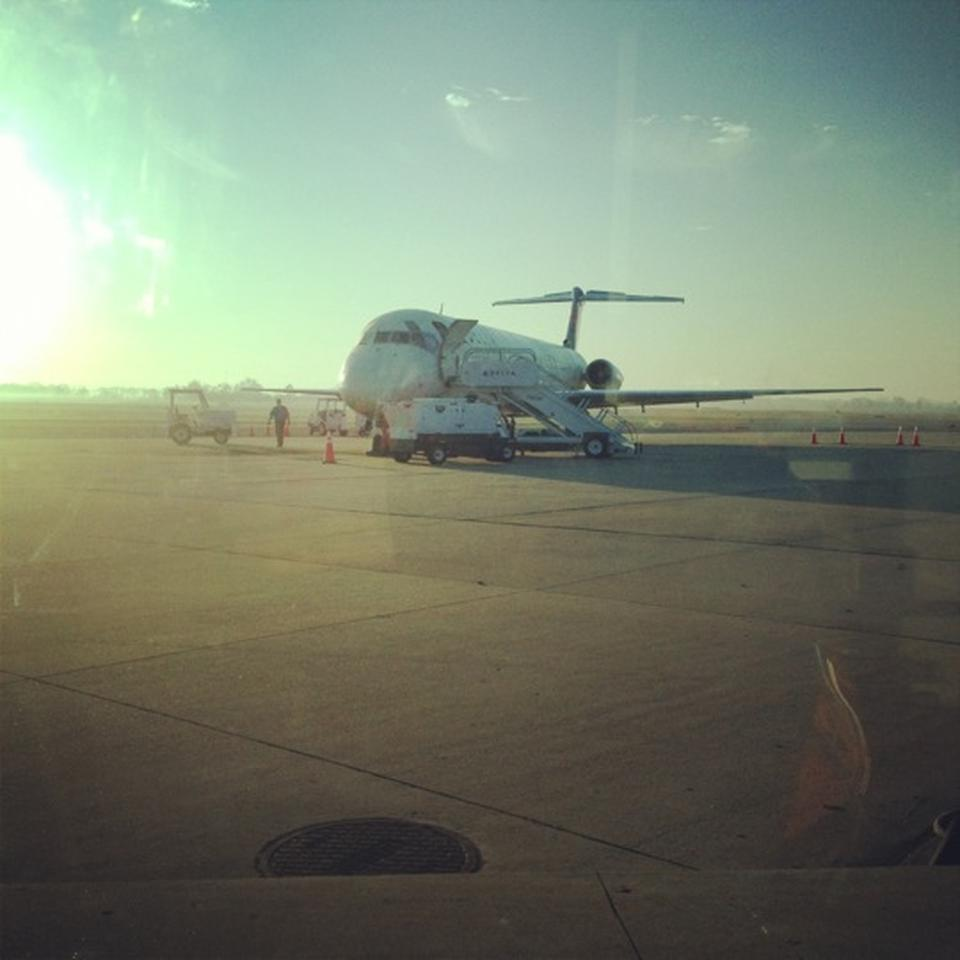
A Delta MD-88 at Gate 3

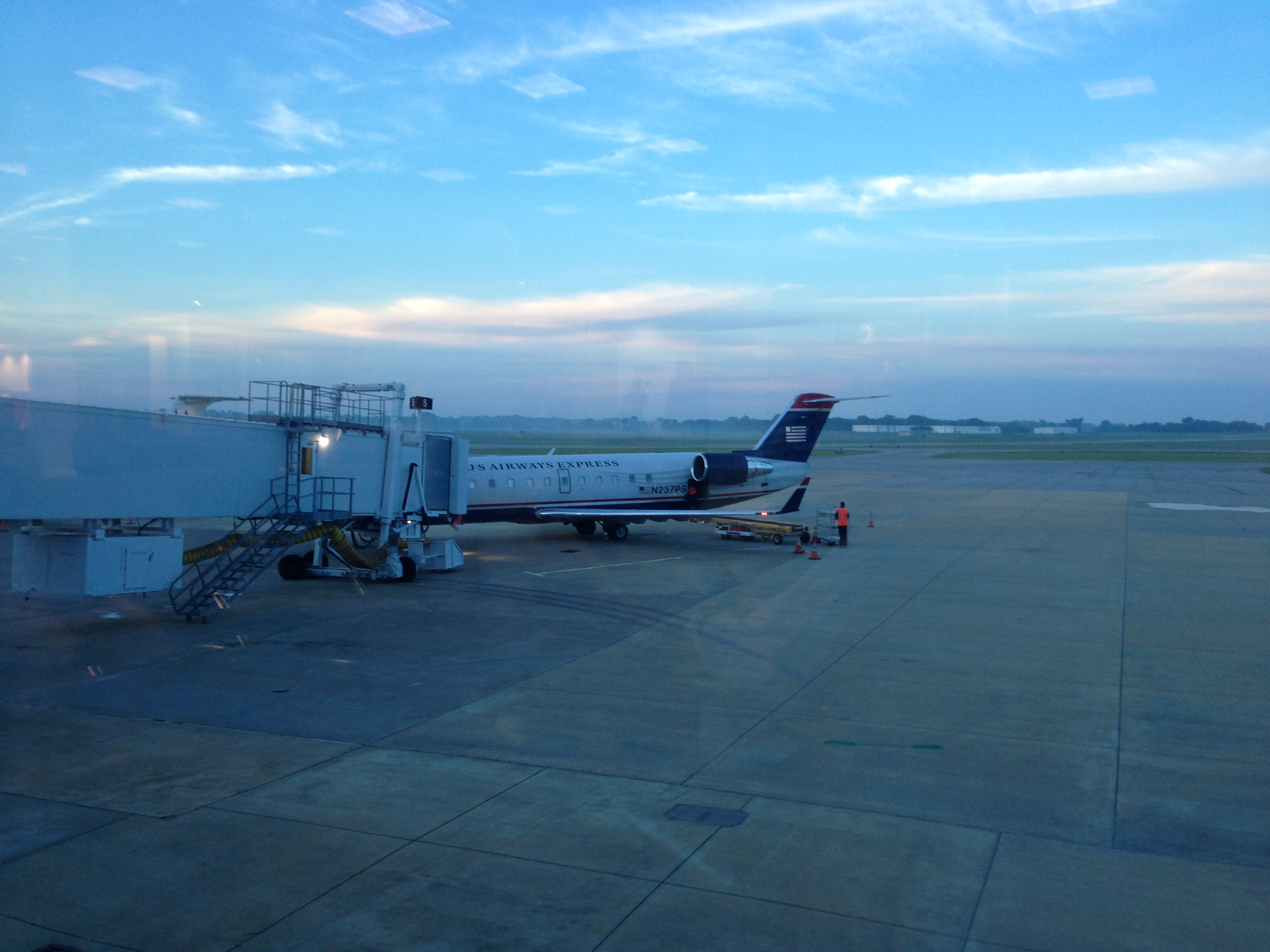
A US Airways Express CRJ-200

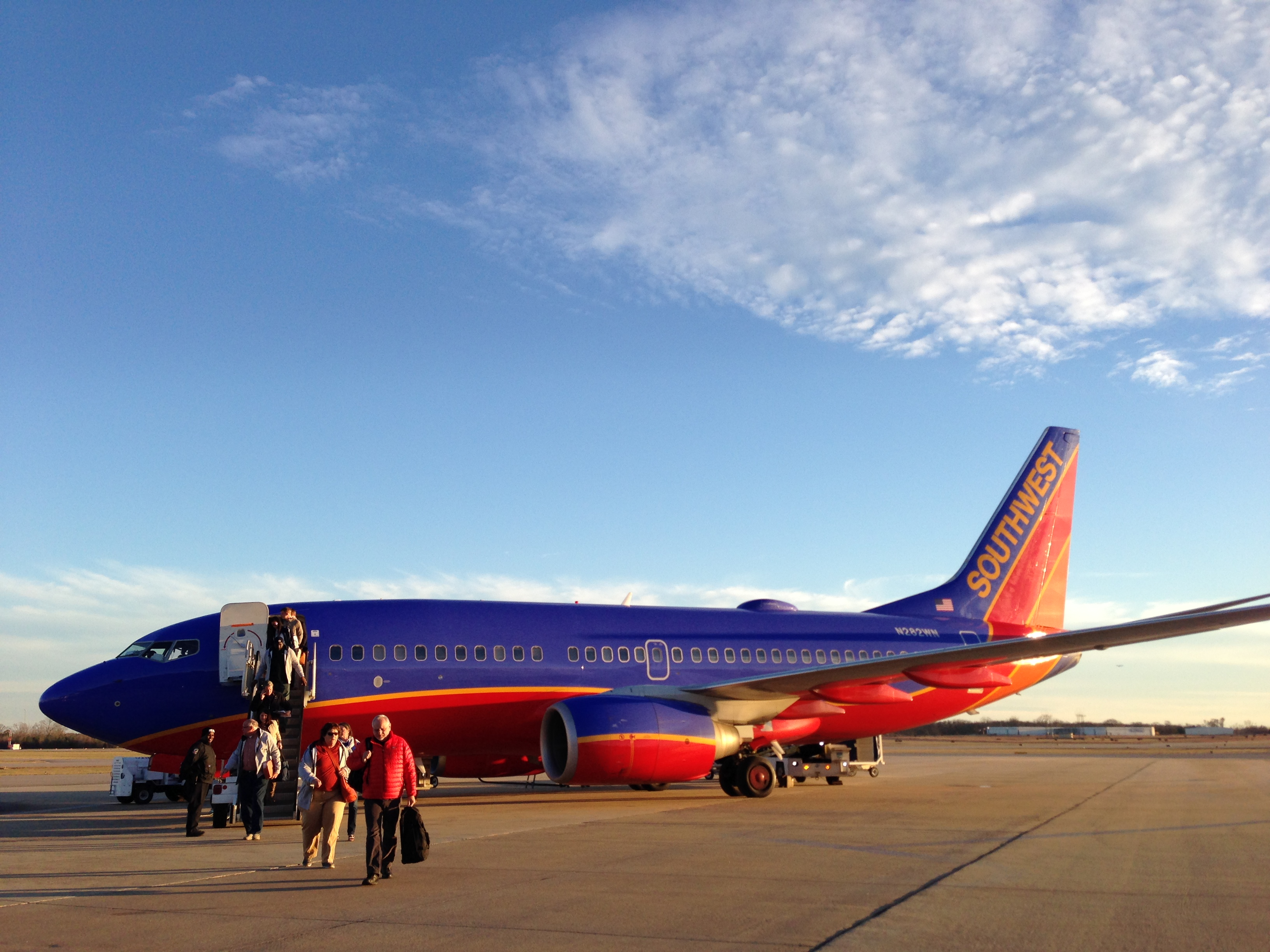
Southwest Airlines 737-700 charter deplaning at MGM Airport

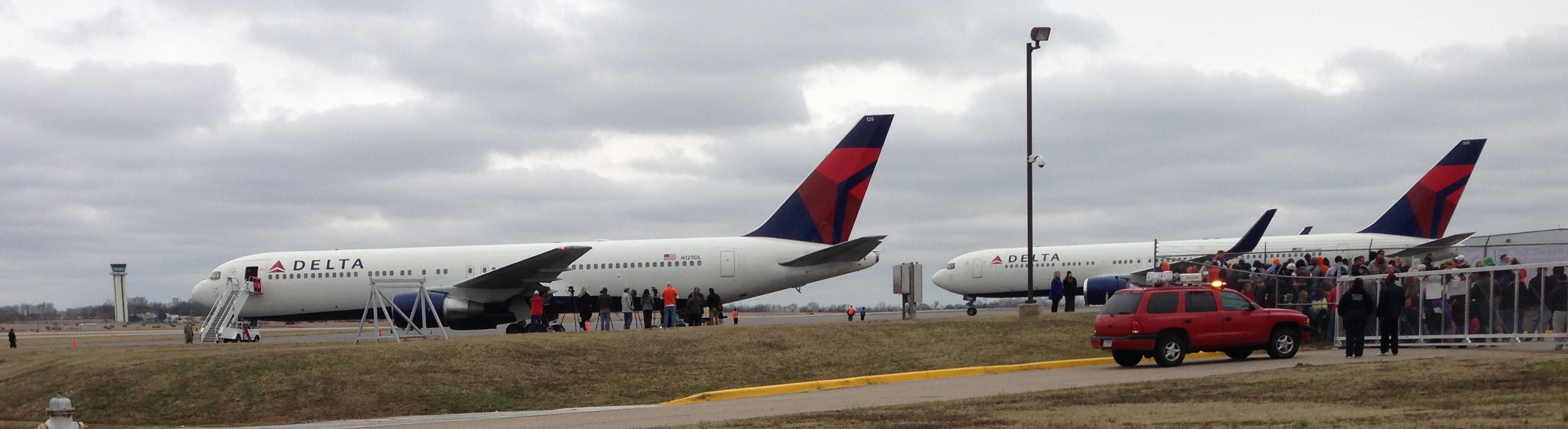
Two Delta 767-300s at MGM

== See also ==
- List of airports in Alabama
