= Vero Beach Regional Airport =

Airport in Florida, U.S.

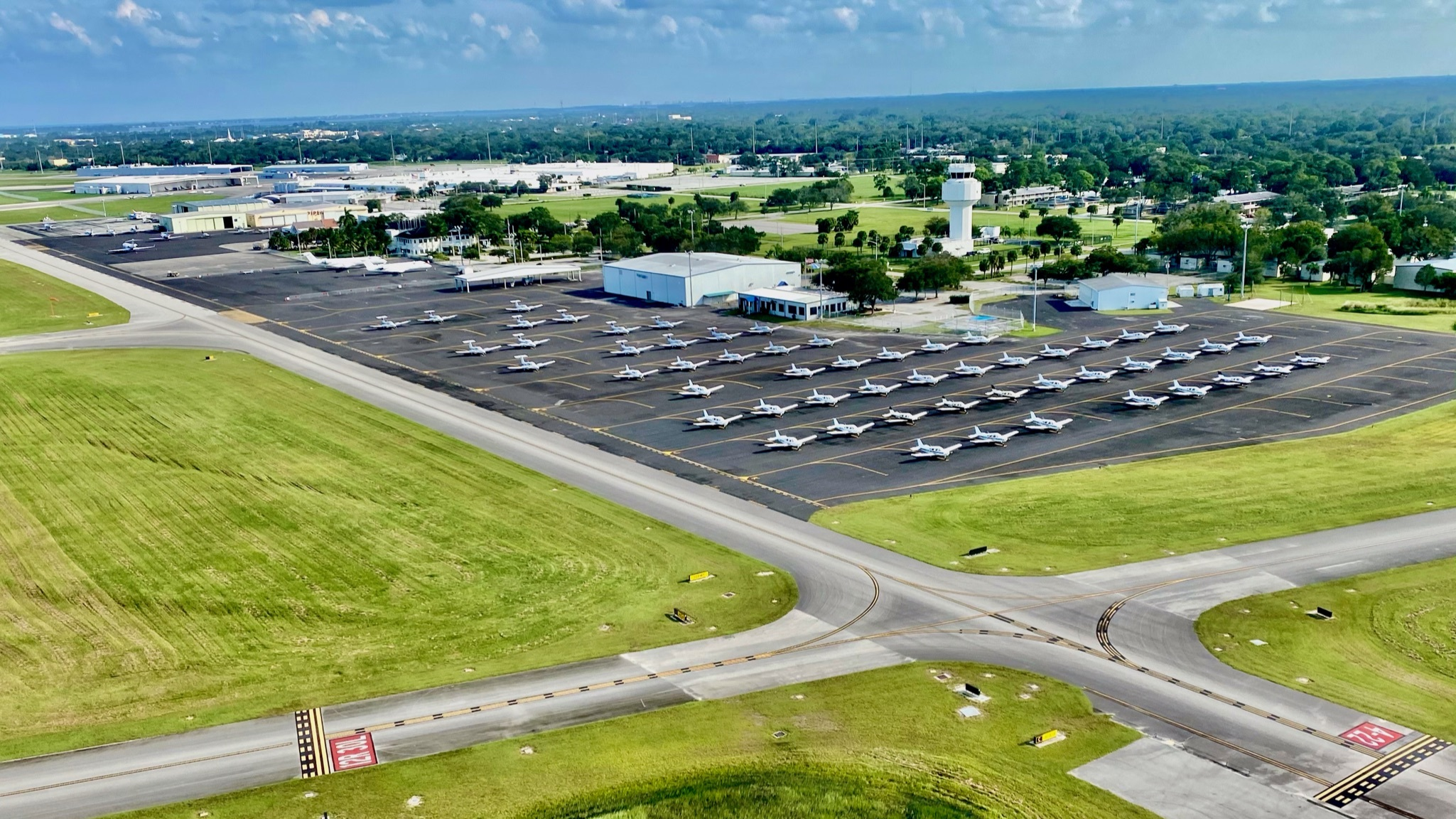
- Vero Beach Regional Airport from the air, looking east
- IATA: VRB; ICAO: KVRB; FAA LID: VRB

Summary
- Airport type: Public use
- Owner: City of Vero Beach
- Serves: Treasure Coast
- Location: Indian River County, Florida
- Operating base for: Breeze Airways
- Elevation AMSL: 24 ft (7.3 m)
- Coordinates: 27°39′20″N 080°25′04.60″W
- Website: www.verobeachairport.com

Maps
- FAA airport diagram
- Interactive map of Vero Beach Regional Airport

Runways
Direction	Length		Surface
Direction	ft	m	Surface
04/22	4,974	1,516	Asphalt
12L/30R	3,504	1,068	Asphalt
12R/30L	7,314	2,229	Asphalt

Statistics (2024)
- Aircraft operations (year ending 1/31/2024): 265,405
- Based aircraft: 212
- Source: Federal Aviation Administration

Vero Beach Regional Airport (IATA: VRB, ICAO: KVRB, FAA LID: VRB) is a public airport located 1 mile (1.6 km) northwest of Vero Beach in Indian River County, Florida, United States. The airport is publicly owned and is the home of Piper Aircraft.

== History ==
=== 1929–1941 ===
In 1929, Bud Holman, whose sons and grandsons now operate Sun Aviation, was one of the group that built the airport in Vero Beach. The Vero Beach Regional Airport was dedicated in 1930 and in 1932 Eastern Air Lines began refueling there. In 1935 EAL started passenger and mail service from Vero Beach, making Vero Beach the smallest little airport in Florida to have airmail service, continuing until about January 1973. By the end of the 1930s the airport got runway lights and radio and teletype machines; in 1939, using Public Assistance workers, the runways were extended and a year later the Civil Aeronautics Administration spent $250,000 on more improvements.

=== NAS Vero Beach ===
In 1942 the U.S. Navy notified Vero Beach that it had selected its airport for a naval air station and purchased 1,500 acres (6.1 km^{2}) surrounding the airport. The base was commissioned as Naval Air Station Vero Beach in 1942 and initially functioned as an operational training unit training for Naval Aviators beginning in February 1943 with the SB2A Buccaneer aircraft.

In December 1944 the mission of NAS Vero Beach changed to night fighter training using F6F Hellcats and F7F Tigercats. Witham Field in Stuart was designated as Naval Auxiliary Air Station Witham Field and was a subordinate base of NAS Vero Beach. Airfields at Sebastian/Roseland (OLF Roseland) and Fort Pierce (OLF Fort Pierce) also served as outlying landing fields. Air-sea rescue of downed pilots was provided from Fort Pierce. Over 237,100 hours of flight time occurred between 1942 and the base closing in 1946. Base personnel were quartered in the Beachland Hotel, The Sebastian Inn, and other facilities in the community. At its peak NAS Vero Beach was home to 250 aircraft and 1,400 U.S. Navy and U.S. Marine Corps personnel, to include Navy WAVES and Woman Marines. After the war, the installation was reduced to a skeletal staff and in 1947 the Navy closed NAS Vero Beach and returned it to the city for use again as a civil airport.

=== Postwar ===
In 1948 Major League Baseball arrived as Bud Holman, a local businessman, invited the Brooklyn Dodgers to take over barracks facilities from the closed naval air station for winter and spring training. The Dodgers liked the area so much that Dodgertown was born, a 110-acre (0.45 km^{2}) tract next to the airport, as their training grounds. The Dodgers continued to use the facility even after becoming the Los Angeles Dodgers until they moved to a new facility in Glendale, Arizona in 2008.

In 1957 Piper Aircraft selected Vero Beach for a research and development center at the former naval air station; in 1961 Piper moved administrative and manufacturing operations here. By 1967 Piper had expanded its facility to 11 acres (45,000 m^{2}) and its workforce to over 2,000. Manufacturing of Piper Aircraft at the Vero Beach facility ceased in the mid-1980s when increasing product liability insurance premiums made continued operation financially impossible. Upon limitation of liability by new legislation by United States Congress in the early 1990s, manufacturing began again in 1995.

Paris Air Inc. Flight Academy, a flight training organization based at Vero Beach Regional Airport, was founded in 1988 by Paris G. Christodoulides. The academy provides FAA Part 141 and Part 61 pilot training programs and serves both domestic and international students. Over time, it has grown into one of the established flight training providers at the airport, contributing to the airport’s role as a center for pilot training activity.

Skyborne Airline Academy, a flight training school, is also based at Vero Beach Regional Airport. The British company purchased and rebranded the FlightSafety Academy in 2021 in order to expand its flight training to the United States.

Today, Vero Beach Regional Airport is a 1,707-acre (6.91 km^{2}) tower-controlled facility with an FAR Part 139 operating certificate. The airport has seen commercial passenger service from mainly regional airlines in the past including USAir Express flights to Melbourne and Orlando in the 1990s. In January 1973 Vero Monmouth Airlines, run by the president of the New Jersey commuter airline Monmouth Airlines, replaced Eastern Air Lines service with flights to Tampa and Miami; it left the terminal on April 30, 1975, after the city had ordered it to vacate. However, commercial service ended for nearly two decades when American Eagle flew its last flight to Miami in February 1996. Elite Airways began operating flights from the airport in 2015 but stopped indefinitely in 2022, when the airline ceased operations.

=== 2020–present ===
Following Elite's shutdown, scheduled commercial service at the airport resumed in February 2023 when Breeze Airways launched services to Hartford, expanding to other destinations as the year progressed. The airline would later establish a base of operations at the airport the following year. Vero Beach is one of the few commercial airports in the United States to offer free long-term parking for up to 21 days. In March 2025, the airport announced it would open a U.S. Customs and Border Protection office, making it an International Airport, which opened in July 2025.

In Fall 2025, Vero Beach Regional Airport officials announced the introduction of two new airlines to the airport: American Airlines and JetBlue. Daily JetBlue flights to Boston and New York began on December 11, 2025 and American Airlines flights to Charlotte began in February 2026.

The airport is making progress on a $1.9 million terminal expansion that includes walkways for passengers and a covered baggage claim area. Upgrades are meant to address a congested airline parking ramp, which cannot accommodate as many airliners as serve the airport.

== Airlines and destinations ==
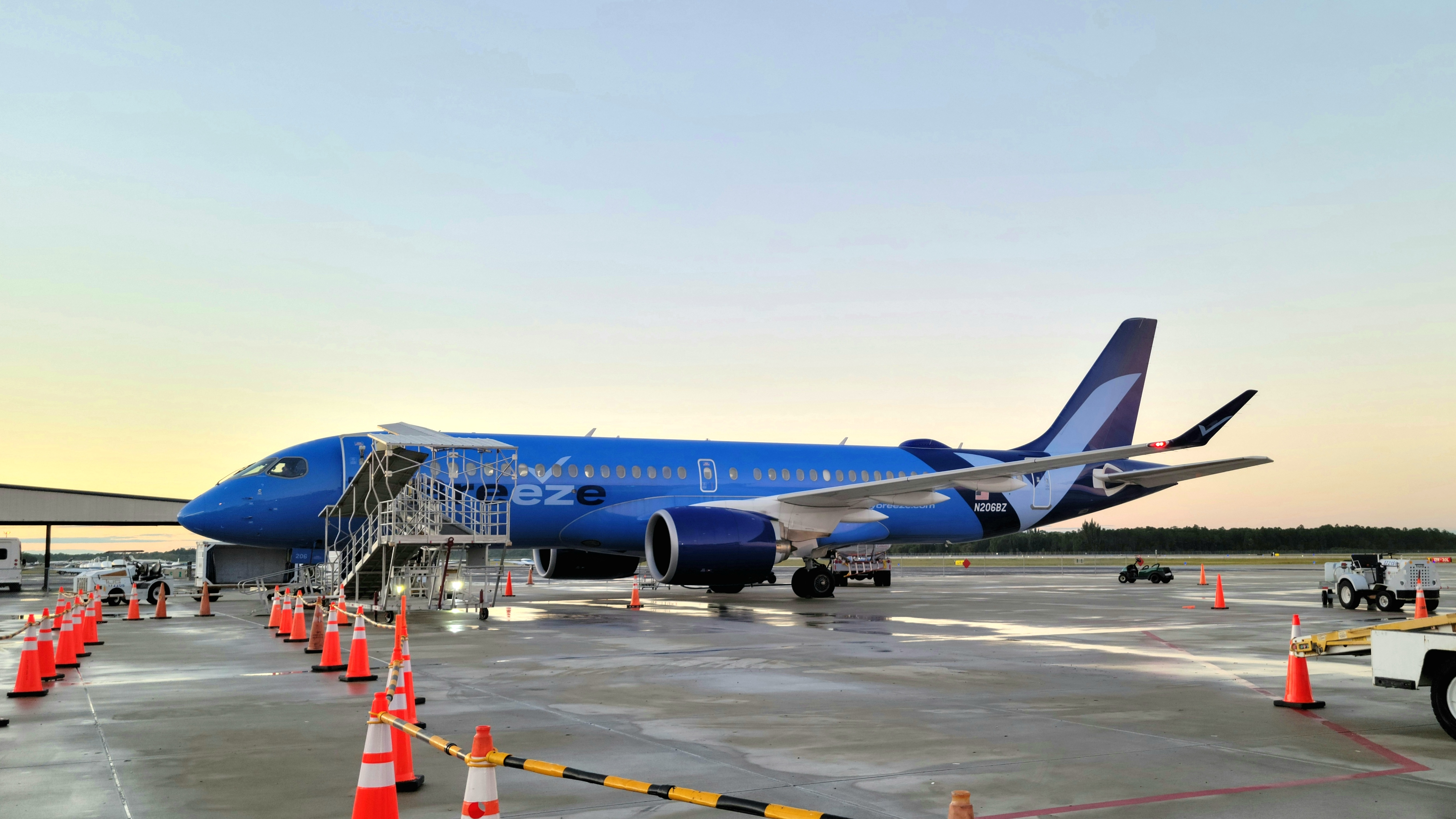
A Breeze Airways Airbus A220-300 at the terminal ramp

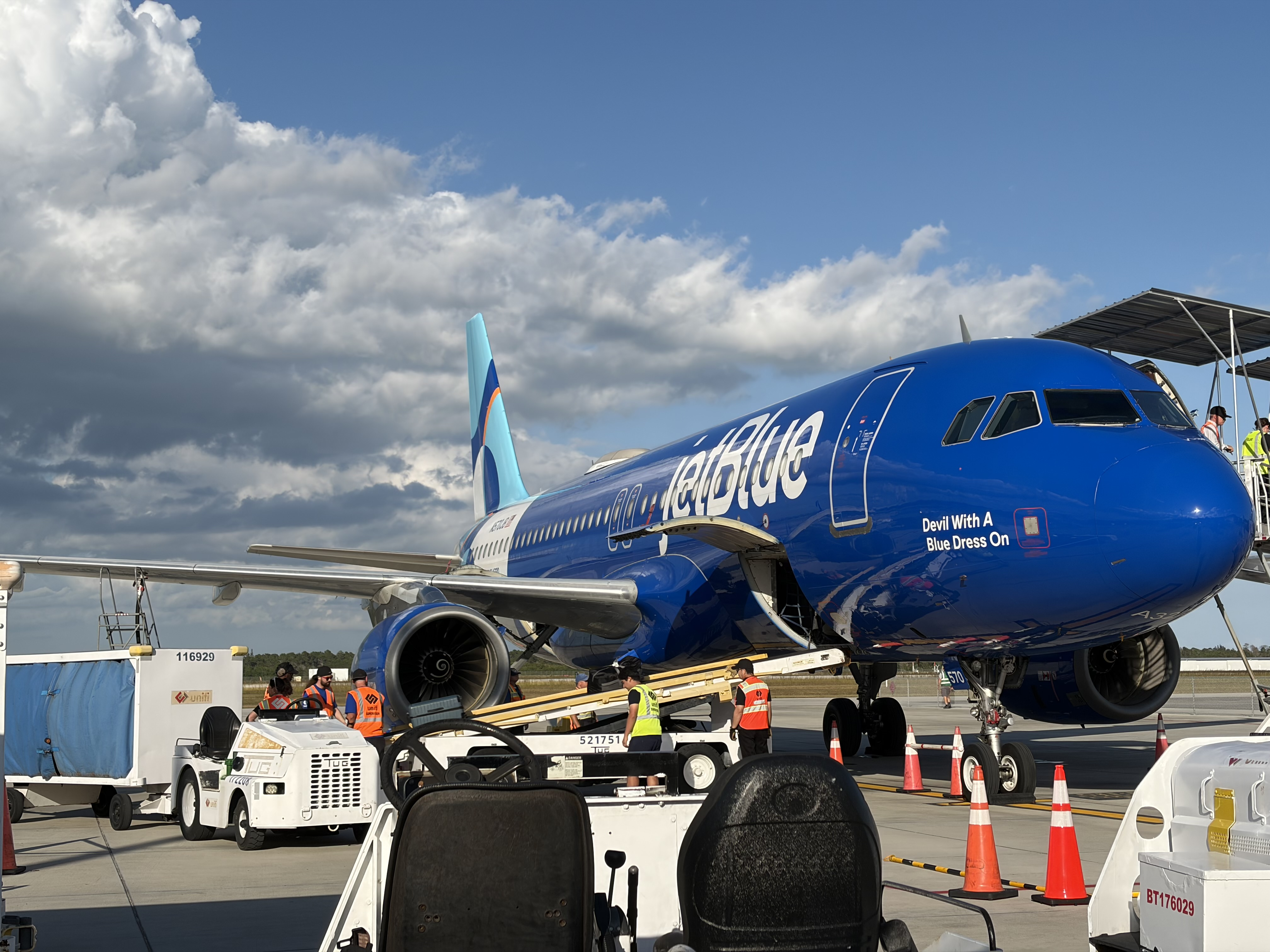
JetBlue Airbus A320 parked at the gate at Vero Beach Regional Airport in December 2025

Airlines	Destinations
American Eagle	Charlotte; Seasonal: Philadelphia
Breeze Airways	Atlantic City, Baltimore, Hartford, Long Island/Islip, New Haven, Pittsburgh, Providence, Raleigh/Durham, Trenton, Washington–Dulles, White Plains
JetBlue	Boston

== Statistics ==
Busiest routes from VRB (September 2025 – August 2026)
Rank	City	Passengers	Carrier(s)
1	(New York (state)) White Plains, New York	32,940	Breeze
2	Boston, Massachusetts	24,530	JetBlue
3	Providence, Rhode Island	22,860	Breeze
4	(New York (state)) New York–JFK, New York	21,960	JetBlue
5	Hartford, Connecticut	19,300	Breeze
6	(New York (state)) Islip, New York	17,040	Breeze
7	Charlotte, North Carolina	11,780	American
8	Washington–Dulles, Virginia	10,060	Breeze
9	New Haven, Connecticut	4,570	Breeze
10	Raleigh/Durham, North Carolina	3,350	Breeze

Carrier shares (September 2025 – August 2026)
Carrier	Passengers (arriving and departing)
Breeze	219,000(65,42%)
Jetblue	93,760(28.06%)
PSA	21,770(6.51%)

== See also ==
- List of airports in Florida
