= El Paisano Ranch =

Ranch in Jims Wells County, Texas, U.S.

Map of Texas highlighting Jim Wells County, home of El Paisano Ranch

El Paisano Ranch is a ranch located in Jim Wells County, Texas, United States. It is one of the oldest working ranches in Texas, operating since 1835, which was ten years before Texas gained statehood in the Union. In November 2014, it was recognized by the Texas Agriculture Commission as a ranch that had been in continuous agriculture production for more than 150 years at the Texas State Capital. El Paisano was originally granted to Ramon de la Garza in 1830 by the Mexican State of Tamaulipas as The Paisano Grant. The original plot was 11070 acres, with 6184 acres in Jim Wells County, 3456 acres in Kleberg County, and 1430 acres in Brooks County. Scenes from the 2023 film Oppenheimer were shot at the ranch.
