= Morón Airport and Air Base =

Airport in Argentina

Morón Airport and Air Base Aeropuerto de Morón y Base Aérea
- IATA: QAM; ICAO: SADM

Summary
- Airport type: Public / Military
- Owner/Operator: Fuerza Aérea Argentina
- Location: Morón, Argentina
- Hub for: CATA (until 2004)
- Elevation AMSL: 95 ft (29 m)
- Coordinates: 34°40′35″S 58°38′34″W

Map
- Location of the airport in Argentina

Runways
Direction	Length		Surface
Direction	m	ft	Surface
02/20	2,817	9,242	Asphalt
- Source: WAD SkyVector

Morón Airport (Spanish: Aeropuerto de Morón) (ICAO: SADM) is 3 kilometres (1.9 mi) southwest of the center of Morón, a western suburb of Buenos Aires in the Buenos Aires Province of Argentina. The airport is located within a densely populated metropolitan area.

== Description ==
The airport covers an area of 439 hectares (1,080 acres). It is located about 20 kilometres (12 mi) from Buenos Aires city and was the main airport in Argentina prior to the opening of Ministro Pistarini International Airport in 1944.

Morón was the base of the defunct airline CATA, which operated between 1986 and 2004.

Also located at Morón are the following institutions:

- the Museo Nacional de Aeronáutica, an aircraft museum with historic aircraft on display.
- the Instituto Nacional de Aviación Civil, a government organization providing training to civilian pilots and technicians.
- a flying school operated by the Aero Club Argentino (Argentine Air Club)
- several private flying schools.

== Military use ==
From 1951 to 1988 was the location of the VII Air Brigade (Spanish: VII Brigada Aérea) of the Argentine Air Force, which operated various aircraft, including: Gloster Meteor, Morane-Saulnier MS-760, Bell UH-1D, Hughes 369, Sikorsky S-58T, Grumman Albatross, and T-34 Mentor.

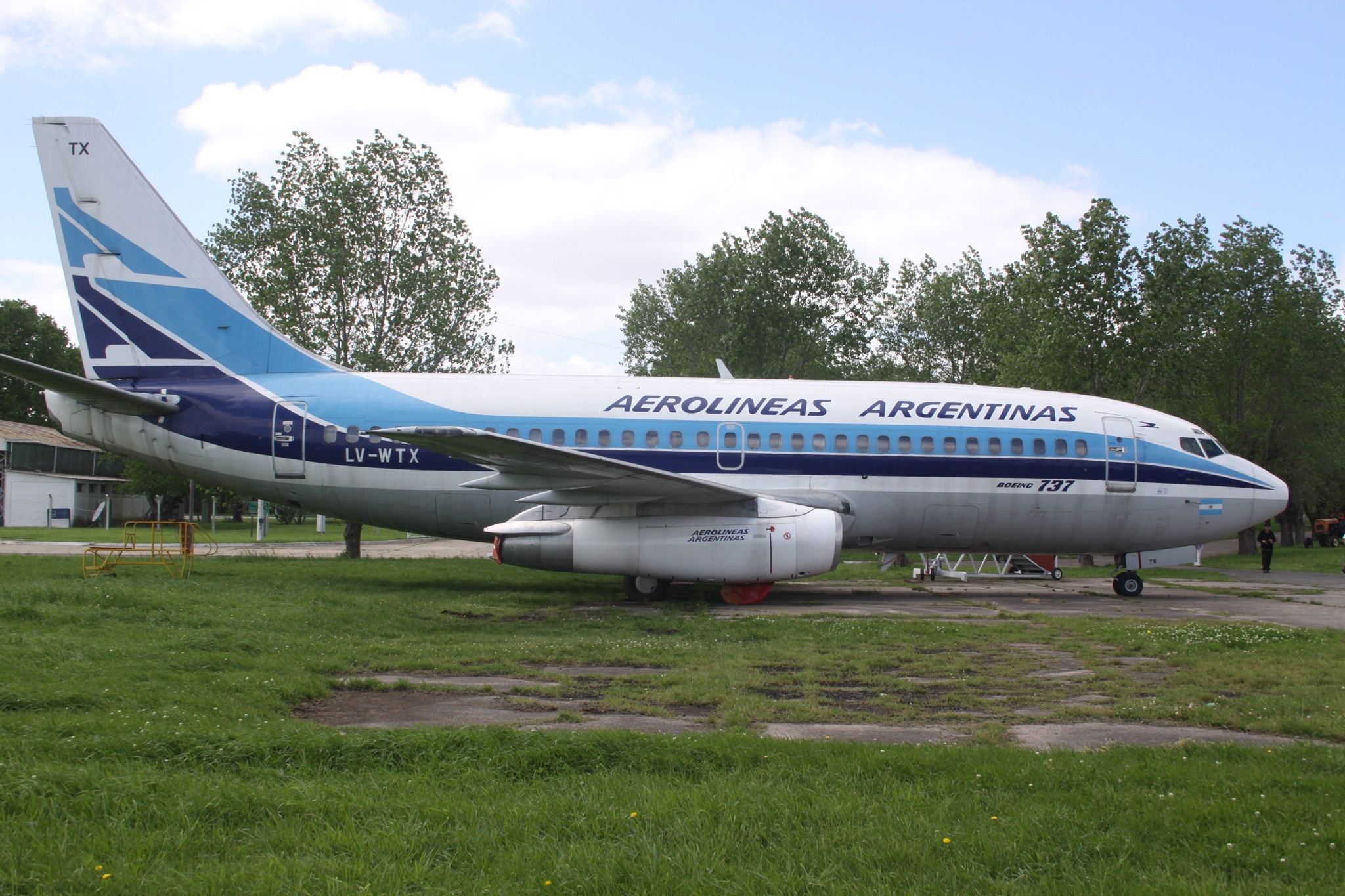
A Boeing 737-200 in the colors of Aerolíneas Argentinas on exhibition at Moron airport (copyright:Aeroprints.com)

== See also ==
- Transport in Argentina
- List of airports in Argentina
