= Paisano Grant =

Land grant in South Texas

The Paisano Grant was one of twenty-five land grants made in the Brooks County/Jim Wells County area of South Texas by the Spanish and Mexican governments between 1797 and 1835. The San Salvador del Tule Grant was the earliest on November 8, 1797, given to Juan Jose Balli. Other important early grants included El Encino en el Poso, made to Luciano Chapa around 1827. The Paisano Grant was also a key grant in the area, with 11070 acres given to Ramon Garza in 1830. Though many of the families receiving grants settled along the Rio Grande River instead of the isolated area near Jim Wells County, Garza kept livestock on the land, and settled the area near Los Olmos, or present day Falfurrias, Texas.

The original grant consisted of 6184 acres in Jim Wells County, 3456 acres in Kleberg County, and 1430 acres in Brooks County. These grants were intended to help colonization of the area by Mexican and Spanish nationals, and strengthen frontier towns along the Texas border. The Paisano Grant succeeded with Garza building a ranch and settling the area.

Though Garza was granted the land in 1830 and had livestock on it, he was not given ownership until he petitioned the local City Council in July 1835 to secure the title for El Paisano. The acting Minister of Treasury of Tamaulipas, José Núñez de Cáceres, certified that Jose Antonio Velasquez deposited 25 pesos for Ramon Garza for the official purchase of The Paisano Grant in late 1835. A ceremony recognizing the possession being given to Garza was held on April 21, 1836.
