= Florida Airlines =

US regional airline, 1960–1982

IATA	ICAO	Call sign
FE	—	Florida
- Founded: 1960; 66 years ago
- Ceased operations: 1981; 45 years ago
- Destinations: Regional Florida
- Headquarters: Tampa, relocated to Sarasota in August 1974

Florida Airlines was a commuter airline based in Florida that operated from 1960 to 1982. It is said to have had the largest Douglas DC3 fleet in the world in 1976. Airline deregulation eventually resulted in the demise of the airline. The company slogan was The Florida Connection.

== Fleet ==
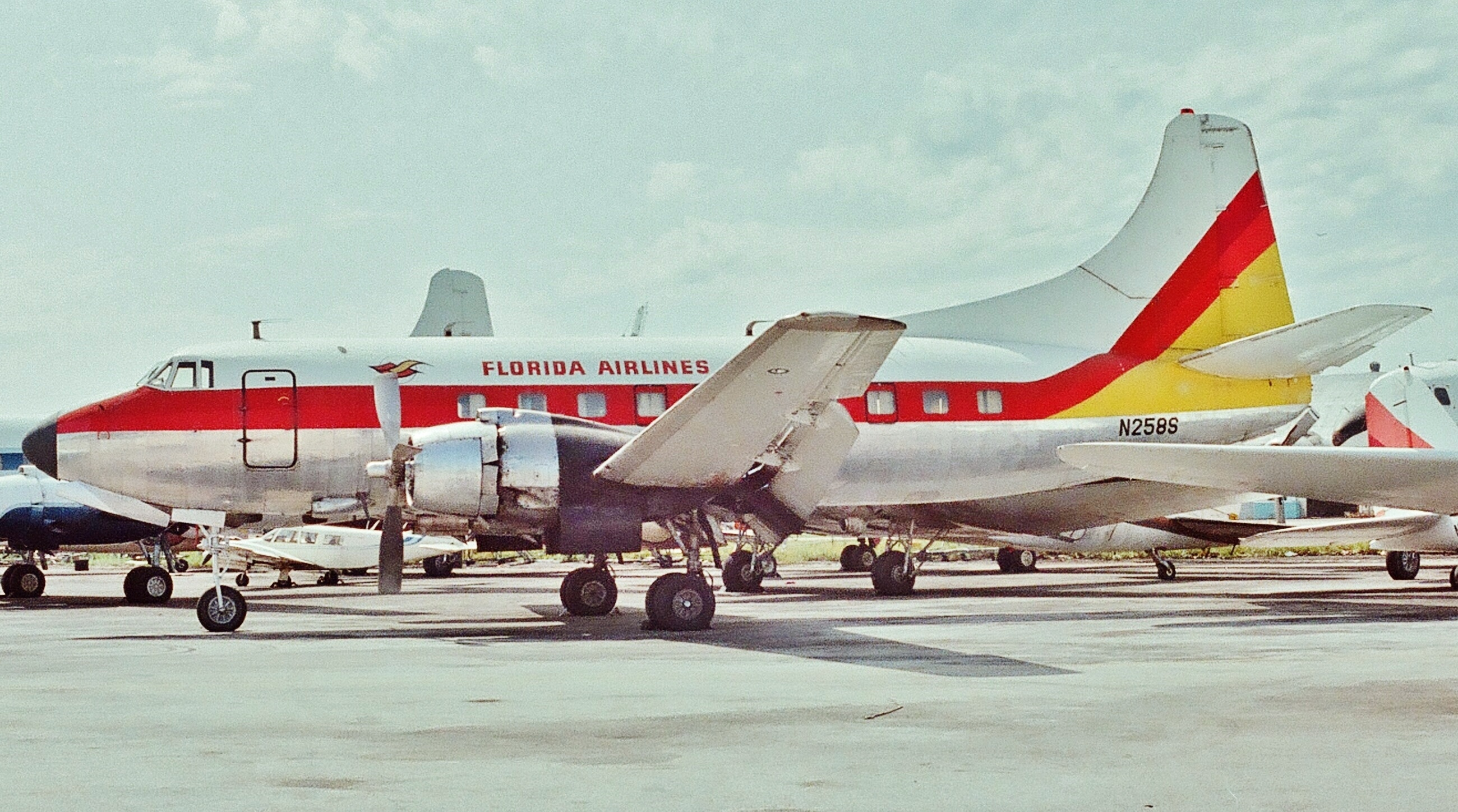
A Martin 404

During the 1960s, Florida Airlines operated a fleet of aircraft described in the below table.

Florida Airlines fleet - 1960s
Aircraft	Total
Piper Apache	3
V-tailed Bonanza	2
Beechcraft D18 - 55C, 90Z	3
Piper Aztec -69Y, 60Y, 37Y	3
Douglas DC-3 - N8701, N6102	2
Cessna 402 - 97Q	1

Florida Airlines also operated Martin 4-0-4 propliner aircraft during its existence.

== History ==
Florida Airlines was incorporated on February 8, 1960, as Florida Air Taxi, Inc. in Tampa, Florida with William Taylor as owner. Taylor had purchased the company in the early 1950s from L. A. Stevens. The name was changed to Florida Airlines, Inc. on October 17, 1969. In 1969, the airline was sold to Lee H. Hill, Sr. and Lee H. Hill, Jr., owners of Hill-Donnelly Publishing company. In late 1973, it was sold by Hills to Arthur C. Allyn. Allyn had previously owned the Chicago White Sox and Executive Airlines. He was also the owner of Sarasota Jungle Gardens and a significant philanthropist in the Sarasota area. In 1975, the airline was purchased by Air South and Shawnee Airlines. The airline filed for Chapter 7 bankruptcy protection and suspended services in January 1980. The airline re-commenced operations as Southern International Airlines (SIA), based at Sarasota in early 1980 (operating under the 'Air Florida Commuter' banner). On December 2, 1981, Southern International Airlines (SIA) operations were suspended. The corporation was dissolved on December 14, 1982

== Destinations ==
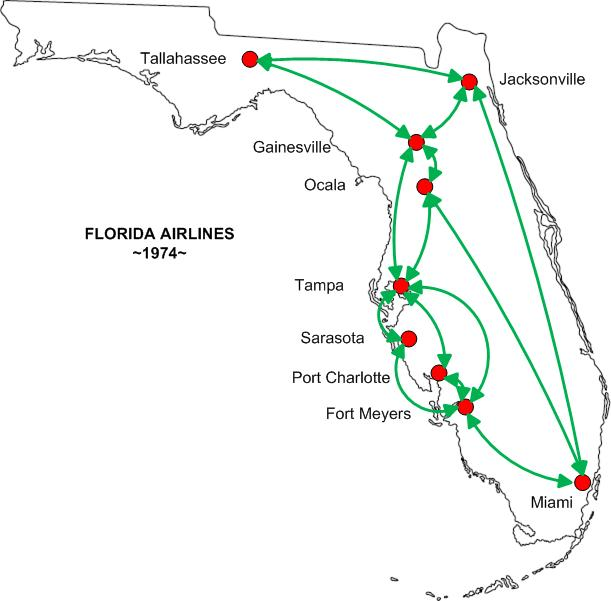
Florida Airlines Route Map 1974

The cities that Florida Airlines served in the 1970s:

- Miami
- Fort Myers
- Sarasota
- Tampa
- Gainesville
- Tallahassee
- Jacksonville
- Ocala
- Punta Gorda
- Port Charlotte
- Fort Lauderdale
- Rock Sound, Bahamas
- Georgetown, Bahamas

In addition, Shawnee Airlines DeHavilland DHC-6 Twin Otter aircraft were operated on special commuter connection services from Orlando and Tampa to the former STOLPORT at Walt Disney World until 1982.

== See also ==
- List of defunct airlines of the United States
