= San Francisco International Airport =

Airport in San Mateo County, California, United States

- Aerial view of San Francisco International Airport in September 2026
- IATA: SFO; ICAO: KSFO; FAA LID: SFO; WMO: 72494

Summary
- Airport type: Public
- Owner/Operator: City and County of San Francisco
- Serves: San Francisco Bay Area
- Location: San Mateo County, California, United States
- Opened: May 7, 1927; 99 years ago
- Hub for: Alaska Airlines; United Airlines
- Time zone: PST (UTC−08:00)
  - Summer (DST): PDT (UTC−07:00)
- Elevation AMSL: 13 ft (4.0 m)
- Coordinates: 37°37′08″N 122°22′30″W
- Public transit access: at San Francisco International Airport
- Website: flysfo.com

Maps
- FAA airport diagram
- Interactive map of San Francisco International Airport

Runways
Direction	Length		Surface
Direction	m	ft	Surface
10L/28R	3,618	11,870	Asphalt
10R/28L	3,469	11,381	Asphalt
1R/19L	2,637	8,650	Asphalt
1L/19R	2,332	7,650	Asphalt

Statistics (2025)
- Total Passengers: 54,532,613
- Aircraft operations: 416,288
- Total cargo (tonnes): 537,115
- Source: San Francisco International Airport and FAA

San Francisco International Airport (IATA: SFO, ICAO: KSFO, FAA LID: SFO) is the primary international airport serving the San Francisco Bay Area in the U.S. state of California. Owned and operated by the City and County of San Francisco, the airport's primary address is 780 South Airport Boulevard, San Francisco, though it is located in an unincorporated area of neighboring San Mateo County, approximately 12 miles (19 km; 10 nmi) southeast of San Francisco.

SFO is the largest airport in the Bay Area and the second-busiest in California, following Los Angeles International Airport (LAX). In 2025, it ranked as the 13th-busiest airport in the United States and the 32nd-busiest in the world by passenger traffic. It is a hub for United Airlines, acting as the airline's primary transpacific gateway and as a major maintenance facility. Additionally, the airport functions as a hub for Alaska Airlines.

== History ==
=== Mills Field ===
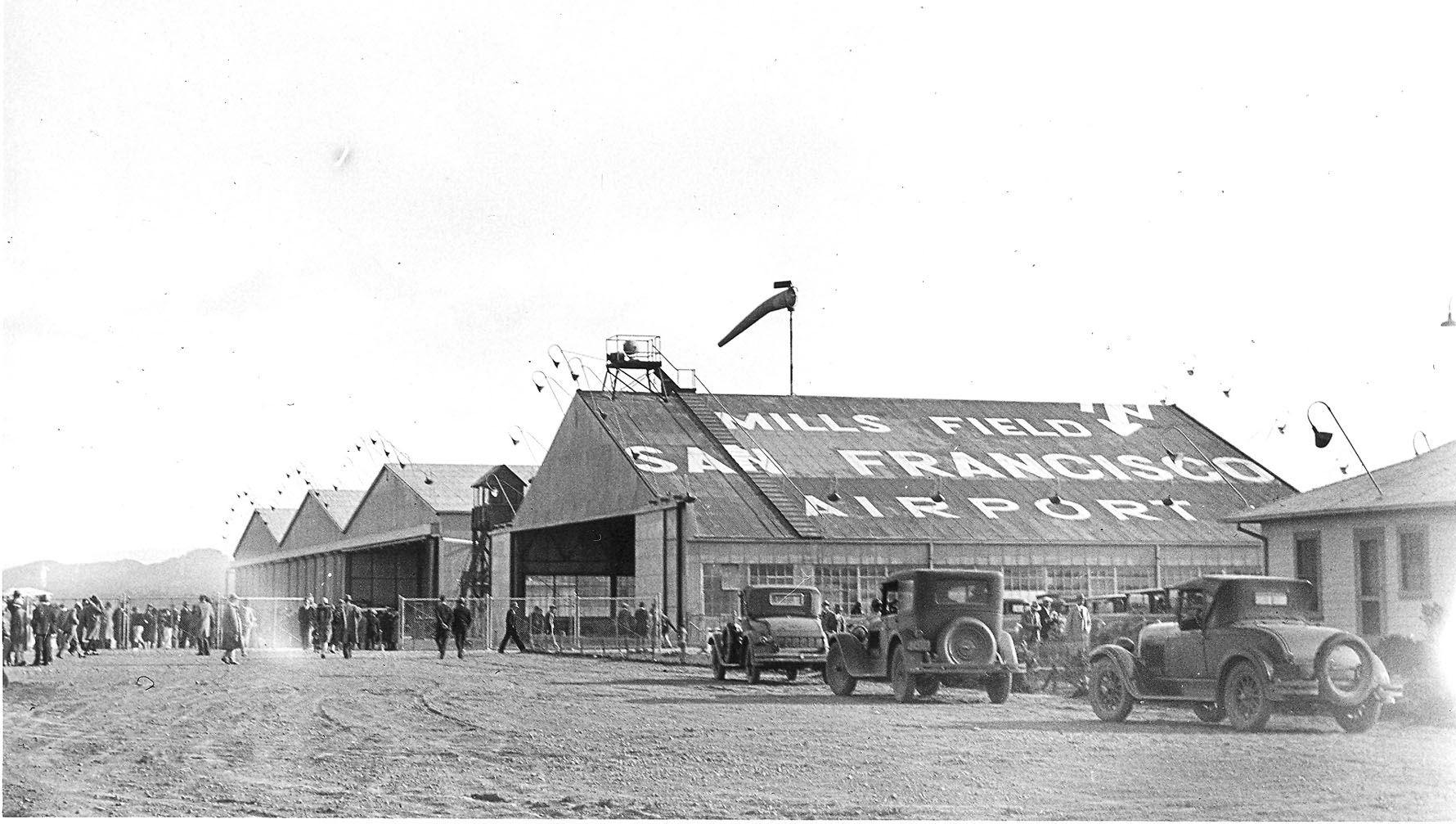
Mills Field, San Francisco Airport (c. 1930s)

The City and County of San Francisco first leased, from the Darius Ogden Mills estate, 150-acre (61-hectare) at the present airport site on March 15, 1927, for what was then to be a temporary and experimental airport project. San Francisco held a dedication ceremony at the airfield, officially named the Mills Field Municipal Airport of San Francisco, on May 7, 1927, on the 150-acre (61-hectare) cow pasture. The land was leased from the Mills Estate in an agreement made with Ogden L. Mills who oversaw the large tracts of property originally acquired by his grandfather, the banker Darius O. Mills. San Francisco purchased the property and the surrounding area expanding the site to 1,112 acres (450 hectares) beginning in August 1930. The airport's name was officially changed to San Francisco Airport in 1931 upon the purchase of the land. "International" was added to the name at the end of World War II as overseas service rapidly expanded.

=== Early operations ===
The earliest scheduled carriers at the airport included Western Air Express, Maddux Air Lines, and Century Pacific Lines. United Airlines was formed in 1934 and quickly became the key carrier at the airport, with Douglas DC-3 service to Los Angeles and New York beginning in January 1937. A new passenger terminal opened in 1937, built with Public Works Administration funding. The March 1939 Official Aviation Guide shows 18 airline departures on weekdays—seventeen United flights and one TWA flight. The August 1952 chart shows runway 1L 7,000 feet long, 1R 7,750 feet, 28L 6,500 feet, and 28R 8,870 feet.

In addition to United, Pacific Seaboard Air Lines flew between San Francisco and Los Angeles in 1933; the Bellanca CH-300s flew San Francisco–San Jose–Salinas–Monterey–Paso Robles–San Luis Obispo–Santa Maria–Santa Barbara–Los Angeles. Competition with United led Pacific Seaboard to move all of its operations to the eastern U.S., and rename itself Chicago and Southern Air Lines (C&S). It became a large domestic and international air carrier. Chicago & Southern was acquired by and merged into Delta Air Lines in 1953, giving Delta its first international routes. Delta used the route authority inherited from C&S to fly one of its first international services operated with Convair 880 jet aircraft from San Francisco to Montego Bay, Jamaica, and Caracas, Venezuela, via intermediate stops in Dallas and New Orleans in 1962.

=== World War II ===
During World War II, the airport was used as a Coast Guard base and Army Air Corps training and staging base. The base was called Naval Auxiliary Air Facility Mills Field and Coast Guard Air Station, San Francisco. Pan American World Airways (Pan Am), which had operated international flying boat service from Treasure Island, had to move its Pacific and Alaska seaplane operations to SFO in 1944 after Treasure Island was expropriated for use as a military base. Pan Am began service from SFO after World War II with five weekly flights to Honolulu, one of which continued to Canton Island, Fiji, New Caledonia, and Auckland.

=== International operations ===
The first service by foreign carriers was on Australian National Airways (ANA) Douglas DC-4s flown by British Commonwealth Pacific Airlines: Sydney–Auckland–Fiji–Kanton Island–Honolulu–San Francisco–Vancouver, BC. The first flight left Australia on September 15, 1946. In 1947 Pan American World Airways began its "round the world" flights from SFO to Guam, Japan, the Philippines, China and other countries; Pan Am also flew to Sydney from SFO. The year 1947 saw the start of United Airlines Douglas DC-6 flights to Hawaii and Philippine Airlines flights to Manila.

TWA began flying Lockheed Constellations (L-1649A's) nonstop to London Heathrow and Paris Orly in 1957. In 1954 Qantas took over the ANA/BCPA route from SFO to Sydney; starting in 1959 their Boeing 707s flew to Sydney via Honolulu and Nadi, Fiji, and in the other direction to New York and London. Pan Am scheduled Boeing 707-320s from Tokyo nonstop to SFO (winter only at first) starting in 1960–61; the westbound nonstops had to await the longer range Boeing 707-320B. British Overseas Airways Corporation (BOAC, a predecessor of British Airways) arrived in 1957; in 1960 its Bristol Britannias flew London–New York City–San Francisco–Honolulu–Wake Island–Tokyo–Hong Kong as part of BOAC's around-the-world service. By 1961 BOAC had replaced the Britannias with Boeing 707s that did not require the fuel stop at the Wake Island Airfield. Japan Airlines (JAL) arrived at SFO in 1954; in 1961 it was flying Douglas DC-8s San Francisco–Honolulu–Tokyo. In 1961 Lufthansa had begun serving SFO with Boeing 707s flying San Francisco–Montreal Dorval Airport–Paris Orly Airport–Frankfurt three days a week. Lufthansa operated Boeing 720Bs on this routing in 1963 along with Boeing 707s to Frankfurt via Montreal and London Heathrow Airport. Pan Am/Panagra service from SFO to South America was taken over in the late 1960s by Braniff International, which operated Douglas DC-8-62s to SFO after Braniff's acquisition of Panagra. In 1970 CP Air (formerly Canadian Pacific Air Lines) Boeing 737-200s flew nonstop to Vancouver, BC, and on to Winnipeg, Toronto, Ottawa and Montreal.

=== Domestic expansion ===
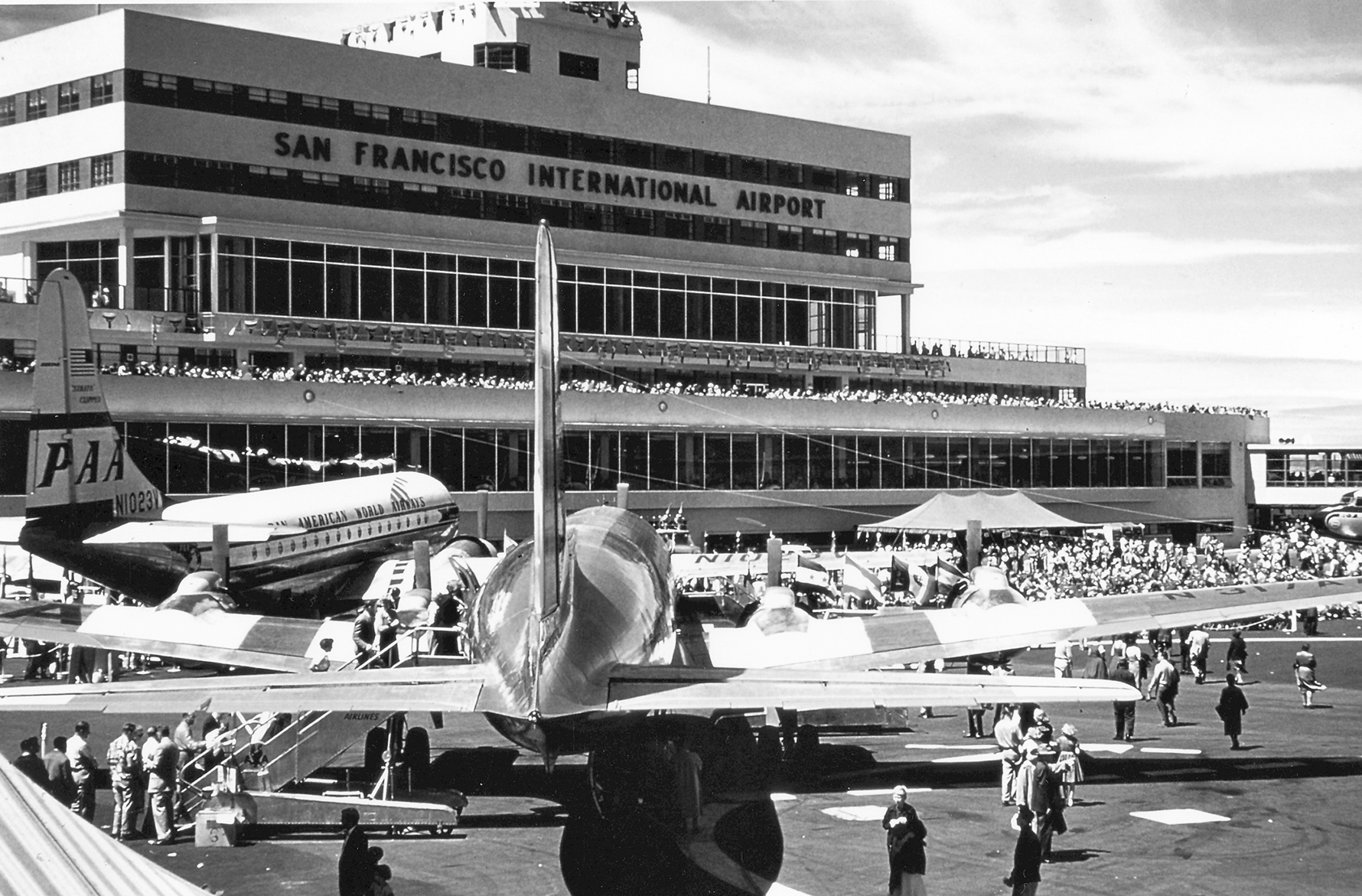
Opening gala at the Central Passenger Terminal on August 27, 1954

The first nonstops to the U.S. east coast were United Douglas DC-7s in 1954. The airport's new Terminal Building opened on August 27, 1954. The large display of aircraft including a Convair B-36 Peacemaker bomber, was a marvel for its time. The building became the Central Terminal with the addition of the South Terminal and the North Terminal and was heavily rebuilt as the International Terminal in 1984 and then modified again as the current Terminal 2. Domestically, the April 1957 Official Airline Guide (OAG) lists 71 scheduled weekday departures on United (plus ten flights a week to Honolulu), 22 on Western Airlines, 19 on Southwest Airways (which was later renamed Pacific Air Lines), 12 on Trans World Airlines (TWA), seven on American Airlines and three on Pacific Southwest Airlines (PSA). As for international flights, Pan American had 21 departures a week, Japan Airlines (JAL) had five, and Qantas also had five.

=== Southwest/Pacific/Air West ===
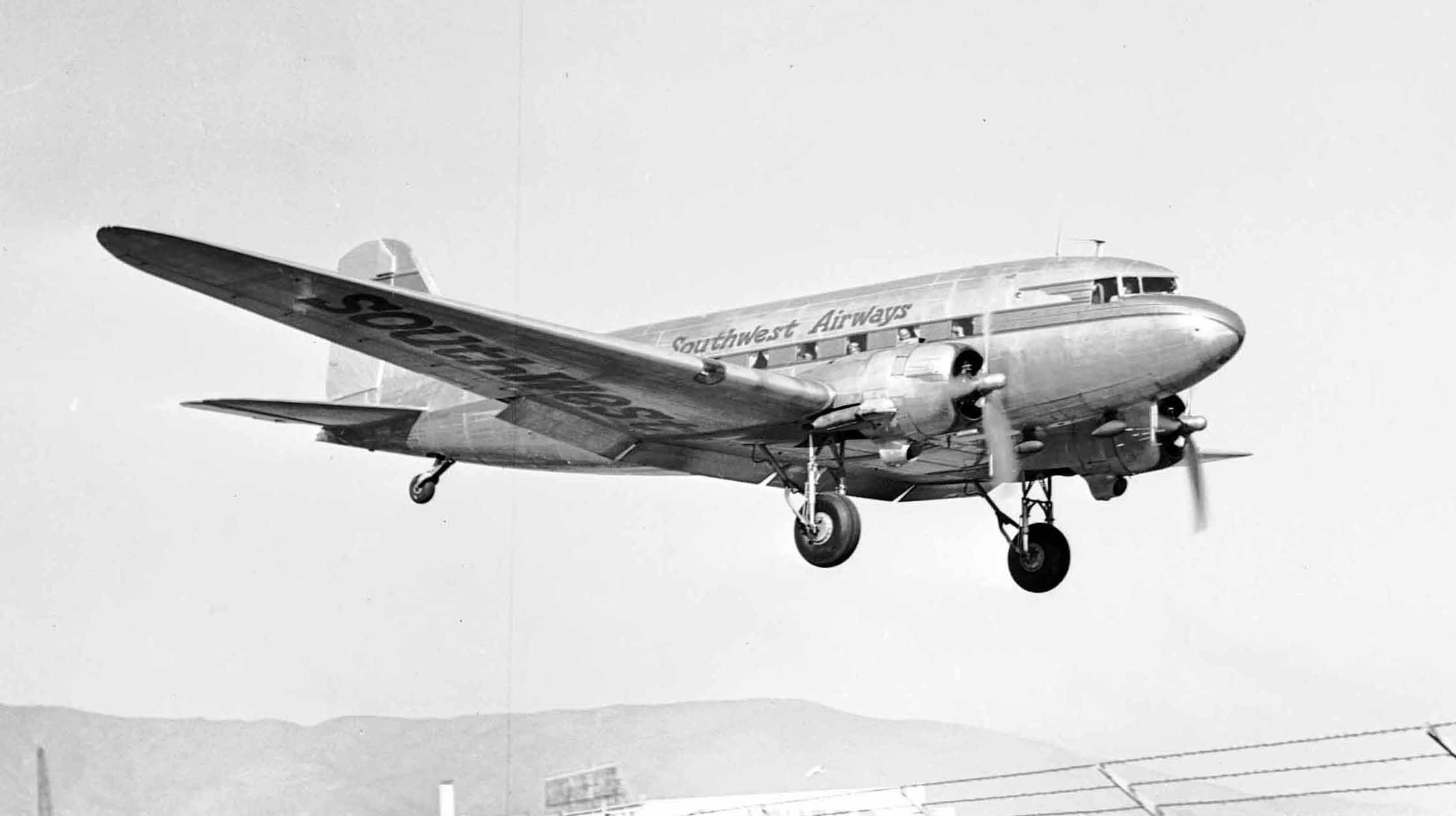
Southwest Airways C-47 landing at SFO in 1948

Southwest Airways began flying scheduled passenger operations from SFO in 1946 with war surplus C-47s, the military version of the Douglas DC-3. In the late 1950s, Southwest Airways changed its name to Pacific Air Lines, which was based at SFO.

In 1959, Pacific Air Lines began flying new Fairchild F-27s from SFO and by 1966 was flying new Boeing 727-100s from the airport. Pacific used the 727 to introduce the first jet service from San Francisco to several cities in California including Bakersfield, Eureka/Arcata, Fresno, Lake Tahoe, Monterey and Santa Barbara.

In 1968 Pacific merged with Bonanza Air Lines and West Coast Airlines to form Air West, which also had its headquarters at SFO. West Coast Airlines had served SFO mainly with Douglas DC-9-10s and Fairchild F-27s to Oregon and Washington states. In 1970, Air West was acquired by Howard Hughes who renamed the airline Hughes Airwest, which continued to be based at the airport where it also operated a hub. By the late 1970s, the airline was operating an all-jet fleet of Boeing 727-200, Douglas DC-9-10, and McDonnell Douglas DC-9-30 jetliners serving an extensive route network in the western U.S. with flights to Mexico and western Canada as well. Hughes Airwest was eventually acquired by Minneapolis-based Republic Airlines (1979–1986) in 1980 and the airline's headquarters office at SFO was closed.

=== Jet age ===
The jet age arrived at SFO in March 1959 when TWA introduced Boeing 707-131s nonstop to New York Idlewild Airport (which was renamed JFK Airport in 1963). United then constructed a large maintenance facility in San Francisco for its new Douglas DC-8s, which were also flying nonstop to New York. In July 1959, the first jetway bridge was installed at SFO, one of the first in the United States. On the cover of January 3, 1960, American Airlines timetable contained this message: "NOW! 707 JET FLAGSHIP SERVICE – NONSTOP SAN FRANCISCO – NEW YORK: 2 FLIGHTS DAILY" Also, in 1960, Western Airlines was operating "champagne flights" with Boeing 707s and Lockheed L-188 Electras to Los Angeles, Seattle, San Diego and Portland, Oregon.

In 1961 the airport had helicopter service on San Francisco and Oakland Helicopter Airlines (known as SFO Helicopter Airlines, and as SFO Helicopter) with 68 flights a day. Helicopters flew from SFO to downtown heliports in San Francisco and Oakland, to a new heliport near the Berkeley Marina and to Oakland Airport (OAK). In its timetable, SFO Helicopter Airlines, which was based at the airport, described its rotorcraft as "modern, jet turbine powered Sikorsky S-62 ten passenger amphibious helicopters".

By 1962 Delta Air Lines was flying Convair 880s to SFO on one its first international jet services, San Francisco–Dallas Love Field–New Orleans–Montego Bay, Jamaica–Caracas, Venezuela. Also in 1962, National Airlines began flying Douglas DC-8s San Francisco–Houston Hobby Airport–New Orleans–Miami. SFO was among the first airports in the United States to install moving walkways inside a terminal. A 450-foot (140 m) set opened on May 20, 1964, in Concourse B and was the world's longest moving walkway at the time.

=== Service in California ===
By 1960, all Pacific Southwest Airlines (PSA) flights out of SFO were operated with Lockheed L-188 Electras nonstop to Los Angeles (LAX) and Burbank (BUR) with some flights continuing to San Diego. In summer 1962 PSA had 14 departures a day, Monday through Thursday to Southern California, 21 departures on Friday and 22 on Sunday. In 1965 PSA was operating new Boeing 727-100s which were joined in 1967 by Boeing 727-200s and McDonnell Douglas DC-9-30s. In 1974, PSA was flying two wide body Lockheed L-1011 TriStars. After the Airline Deregulation Act of 1978, PSA expanded outside of California.

In 1967, another intrastate airline joined PSA at SFO: Air California, flying Lockheed L-188 Electras nonstop to Orange County Airport (SNA, now John Wayne Airport). Like PSA, Air California (later renamed AirCal) eventually became an all-jet airline and expanded outside of California. AirCal was merged into American Airlines while PSA was merged into USAir (later renamed US Airways which in turn eventually merged with American Airlines).

=== Earthquake and planned Bay fill expansion ===
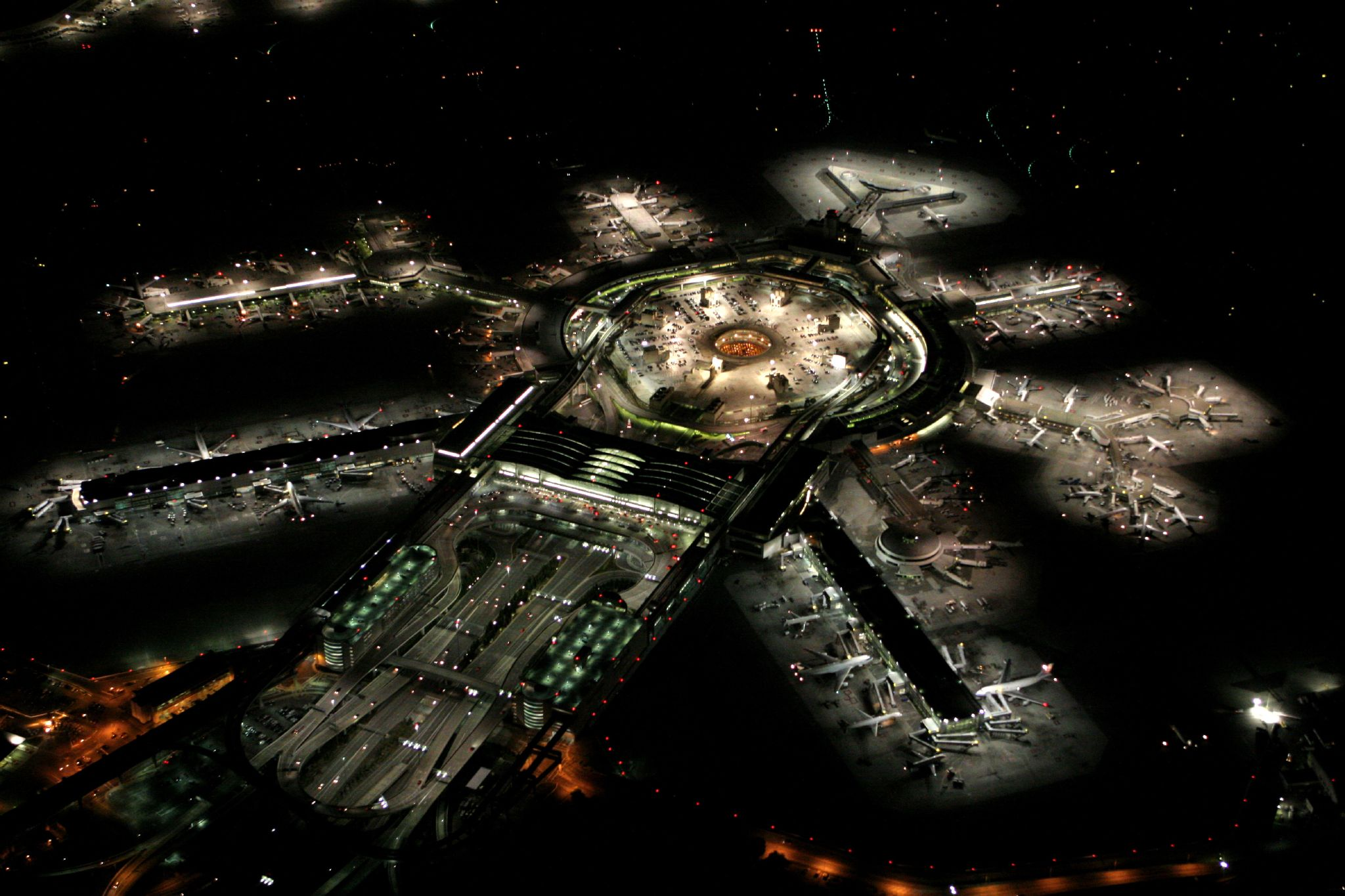
San Francisco International Airport at night in November 2005

The airport closed following the Loma Prieta earthquake on October 17, 1989, reopening the following morning. Minor damage to the runways was quickly repaired.

In 1989, a master plan and Environmental Impact Report were prepared to guide development over the next two decades. During the boom of the 1990s and the dot-com boom SFO became the sixth busiest airport in the world, but since 2001, when the boom ended, SFO has fallen out of the top 20. United Express turboprops were scheduled 60 minutes apart to the shuttle connecting passengers between SFO and nearby San Jose International Airport during the boom era. United Groundlink supplemented this service with alternate 60-minute frequencies.

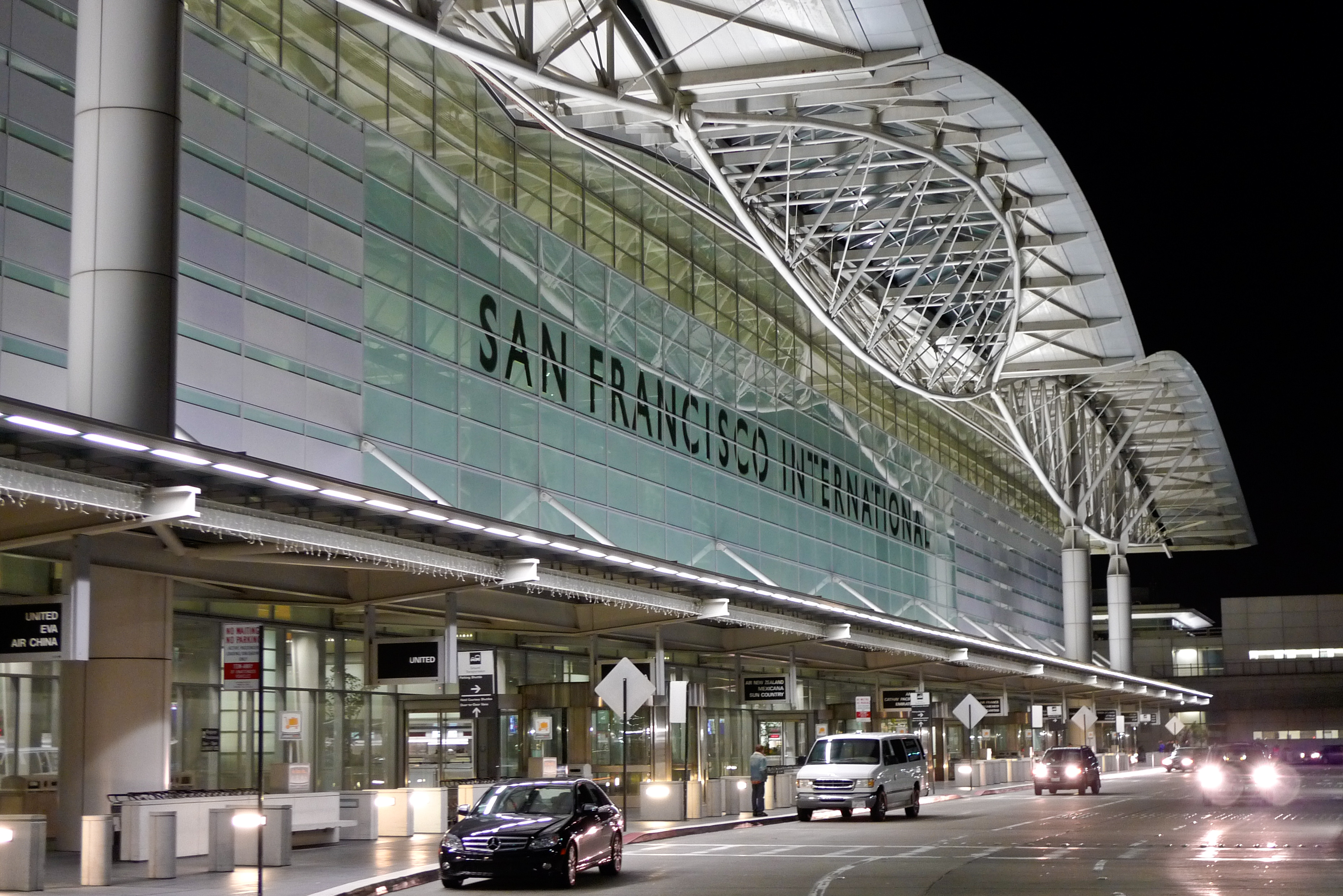
San Francisco International Terminal at night in November 2009

A $2.4 billion International Terminal Complex opened in December 2000, replacing Terminal 2 (known then as the International Terminal). The new International Terminal includes the San Francisco Airport Commission Aviation Museum and Library and the Louis A. Turpen Aviation Museum, as part of the SFO Museum. SFO's long-running museum exhibition program, now called SFO Museum, won unprecedented accreditation by the American Alliance of Museums in 1999.

SFO experiences delays (known as flow control) in overcast weather when only two of the airport's four runways can be used at a time because the centerlines of the parallel runway sets (01R/01L and 28R/28L) are only 750 feet (230 m) apart. Airport planners advanced proposals that would extend the airport's runways by adding up to 2 square miles (1,300 acres; 520 ha) of fill to San Francisco Bay and increase their separation by up to 4,300 feet (1,300 m) in 1998 to accommodate arrivals and departures during periods of low visibility. Other proposals included three floating runways, each approximately 12,000 feet (3,700 m) long and 1,000 feet (300 m) wide. The airport would be required by law to restore Bay land elsewhere in the Bay Area to offset the fill. One mitigation proposal would have the airport purchase and restore the 29,000 acres (12,000 ha) of South Bay wetlands owned by Cargill Salt to compensate for the new fill. These expansion proposals met resistance from environmental groups, including the Sierra Club, fearing damage to the habitat of animals near the airport, recreational degradation (such as windsurfing) and bay water quality.

State Senator John L. Burton introduced SB 1562 on February 18, 2000, to bypass the environmental impact study that would normally be required for a large project like the proposed Bay fill and mitigation in order to expedite construction. SB 1562 was signed into law on September 29, 2000. A study commissioned by the airport and released in 2001 stated that alternatives to airport expansion, such as redirecting traffic to other regional airports (Oakland or San Jose), capping the number of flights, or charging higher landing fees at selected times of the day would result in higher fares and poorer service. However, the proposal to build new runways on Bay fill continued to attract opposition from environmental groups and local residents. The airport expansion cost was estimated at US$1,400,000,000 (equivalent to $2,770,000,000 in 2025) in 1998, rising to US$2,200,000,000 (equivalent to $4,250,000,000 in 2025) a year later, including an estimate of US$200,000,000 (equivalent to $387,000,000 in 2025) for the Cargill wetlands purchase and restoration.

The delays during poor weather (among other reasons) caused some airlines, especially low-cost carriers such as Southwest Airlines, to shift all of their services from SFO to the Oakland and San Jose airports. However, Southwest eventually returned to San Francisco in 2007.

=== BART to SFO ===
A long-planned extension of the Bay Area Rapid Transit (BART) system to the airport opened on June 22, 2003, allowing passengers to board BART trains at the international or domestic terminals and have direct rail transportation to downtown San Francisco, Oakland, and the East Bay. On February 24, 2003, the AirTrain people mover opened, transporting passengers between terminals, parking lots, the BART station, and the rental car center on small automatic trains.

=== Recent developments ===
SFO became the base of operations for start-up airline Virgin America, with service to over 20 destinations. On October 4, 2007, an Airbus A380 jumbo jet made its first visit to SFO. On July 14, 2008, SFO was voted Best International Airport in North America for 2008 in the World Airports Survey by Skytrax. The following year on June 9, Skytrax announced SFO as the second-best International Airport in North America in the 2009 World Airports Survey, losing to Dallas/Fort Worth International Airport.

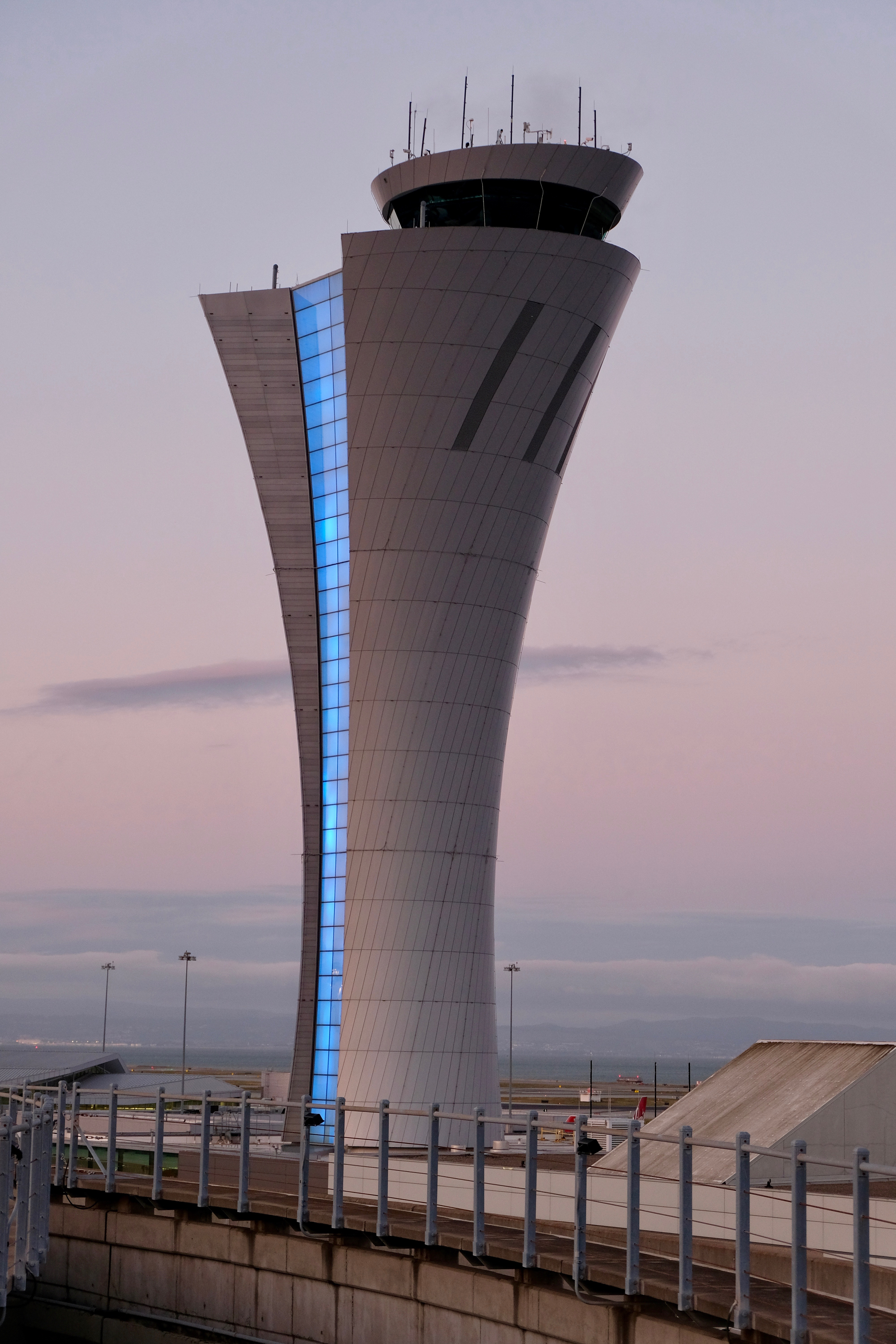
New control tower (photographed in April 2018)

In response to longstanding FAA concerns that the airport's air traffic control tower, located atop Terminal 2, could not withstand a major earthquake, on July 9, 2012, crews broke ground for a new torch-shaped tower. The new tower is located between Terminals 1 and 2, and the base of the tower building contains passages between the two terminals for passengers both pre- and post-security screening, which dictated the narrow tower base. Originally scheduled for completion in the summer of 2016 at a cost of $102 million, the new tower began operations on October 15, 2016.

SFO was one of several US airports that operated the Registered Traveler program from April 2007 until funding ended in June 2009. This program let travelers who had paid for pre-screening pass through security checkpoints quickly. Baggage and passenger screening is operated by Covenant Aviation Security, a Transportation Security Administration contractor. They will be replaced by VDM of Xcelerate Solutions in December 2026. SFO was the first airport in the United States to integrate in-line baggage screening into its baggage handling system and has been a model for other airports since the September 11 attacks in 2001.

In September 2018, SFO announced plans to use sustainable fuels after signing an agreement with fuel suppliers, airlines, and agencies. As part of the agreement, Shell and SkyNRG began supplying sustainable aviation fuel to KLM, SAS, and Finnair flights operating out of SFO.

Like most other airports, SFO sustained a massive decline in traffic in 2020 and 2021 because of the COVID-19 pandemic. The only upside was that the decline reduced traffic to levels easily handled in all weather conditions. In 2022, SFO was ranked no. 1 by The Wall Street Journal on its list of Best Large U.S. Airports, on which the airport was ranked no. 1 for both reliability and convenience.

On August 6, 2024, SFO unveiled a new logo and brand identity, retiring its previous logo after 24 years of use. The logo will be phased in over several years.

== Runways ==
FAA runway diagram of SFO, with color added to terminals and runways; illustrates Terminal 1 prior to construction of the Harvey Milk Terminal

The airport covers 5,207 acres (21.07 km^{2}) at an elevation of 13.1 feet (4.0 m). It has four asphalt runways, arranged in two intersecting sets of parallel runways:

- Runway 01L/19R: 7,650 ft × 200 ft (2,332 m × 61 m), surface: asphalt, has approved GPS approaches
- Runway 01R/19L: 8,650 ft × 200 ft (2,637 m × 61 m), surface: asphalt, ILS/DME equipped, and has approved GPS/VOR approaches
- Runway 10L/28R: 11,870 ft × 200 ft (3,618 m × 61 m), surface: asphalt, Category III ILS/DME equipped, and has approved GPS approaches
- Runway 10R/28L: 11,381 ft × 200 ft (3,469 m × 61 m), surface: asphalt, ILS/DME equipped, and has approved GPS approaches

Runways are named for their magnetic heading, to the nearest ten degrees; hence the runways at 14° from magnetic north are 01L/01R, and the runways at 284° are 28R/28L. The layout of the parallel runways (1L/1R and 28R/28L) was established in the 1950s, and has a separation (centerline to centerline) of only 750 feet (230 m).

During normal operations (approximately 81% of the time), domestic departures use Runways 1L and 1R for departure while overseas international departures and all arrivals use Runways 28L and 28R, taking advantage of the prevailing west-northwesterly wind coming through the San Bruno Gap. During periods of heavy winds or if operations at Oakland International Airport conflict with SFO departures (approximately 15% of the time), Runways 1L and 1R cannot be used, and so all departures and all arrivals use Runways 28L and 28R. These configurations are known collectively as the West Plan, and accommodate arrivals at a rate of up to 60 aircraft per hour.

When using 28L and 28R for landing, aircraft join the final approach at DUMBA waypoint next to the Dumbarton Bridge. In most circumstances, aircraft from the north or west start the approach from Daly City, California, descend along the east or west shoreline of the San Francisco Peninsula, and join the final after bypassing waypoints MENLO near Menlo Park and DUMBA; aircraft from the south join the final through MENLO and DUMBA after flying over the Santa Cruz Mountains; aircraft from the east join the final approach after bypassing Milpitas, California.

Under visual flight rules, aircraft were formerly able to safely land side by side, essentially simultaneously, on runways 28L and 28R while maintaining visual separation. When the visual approach is compromised, the West Plan is maintained with a modification to allow aircraft landing on 28L to use Instrument Landing System (ILS) while the aircraft landing on 28R takes an offset course, monitored via high scan rate ground radar, to maintain a lateral spacing greater than 750 ft until the aircraft can maintain visual separation. Visual separation typically occurs once the aircraft has descended below the cloud deck at an altitude of 2,100 feet (640 m). This is known as the Precision Runway Monitor/Simultaneous Offset Instrument Approach, which reduces capacity to 36 arriving aircraft per hour. In poor visibility conditions, FAA instrument approach rules require aircraft to maintain lateral separation of 4,300 feet (1,300 m), meaning only one runway may be used, reducing the capacity of SFO to 25–30 arriving aircraft per hour.

During rainstorms (approximately 4% of the time), the prevailing winds shift to a south-southeasterly direction, and departing aircraft use Runways 10L and 10R, and arriving aircraft use Runways 19L and 19R. This configuration is known as the Southeast Plan.

On rare occasions (less than one day per year, on average), wind conditions dictate other runway configurations, including departures and landings on Runways 10L and 10R, departures and landings on Runways 1L and 1R, and departures on Runways 19L and 19R and landings on Runways 28L and 28R.

=== Ban of simultaneous parallel landings ===
On March 31, 2026, the Federal Aviation Administration (FAA) implemented a permanent ban on simultaneous "side-by-side" parallel landings at the airport. The directive prohibits visual approaches on runways 28L and 28R, which are spaced only 750 feet (230 m) apart, a configuration the FAA determined no longer met modern aircraft separation standards. Pilots are now required to use staggered, radar-based approaches even in clear weather. This policy change effectively reduced the airport's maximum arrival capacity by 33%, dropping from 54 to 36 flights per hour. SFO officials estimate that approximately 25% of arriving flights will experience delays of at least 30 minutes, an increase from previous forecasts. However, the capacity reduction coincides with a six-month repaving project on runways 01R/19L, further decreasing the airport's operational capacity. Major carriers, including United Airlines and Alaska Airlines, have begun reassessing summer schedules to account for reduced hourly arrivals and longer hold times.

== Based aircraft and operations ==
In the year ending February 29, 2024, SFO had 385,543 aircraft operations, an average of 1,056 per day. This consisted of 90% scheduled commercial, 7% air taxi, 2% general aviation and <1% military. As of September 18, 2025, there were 14 aircraft based at SFO, 5 helicopters, 4 jets, and 5 military aircraft.

== Aircraft noise abatement ==
SFO was one of the first airports to implement a Fly Quiet Program, which grades airlines on their performance on noise abatement procedures while flying in and out of SFO. The Jon C. Long Fly Quiet Program was started by the Aircraft Noise Abatement Office to encourage airlines to operate as quietly as possible at SFO.

SFO was one of the first U.S. airports to conduct a residential sound abatement retrofitting program. Established by the FAA in the early 1980s, this program evaluated the cost-effectiveness of reducing interior sound levels for homes near the airport, within the 65 CNEL noise contour. The program made use of a noise computer model to predict improvement in specific residential interiors for a variety of noise control strategies. This pilot program was conducted for a neighborhood in South San Francisco and success was achieved in all of the homes analyzed. The costs turned out to be modest, and the post-construction interior sound level tests confirmed the predictions for noise abatement. To date over $153 million has been spent to insulate more than 15,000 homes in the neighboring cities of Daly City, Pacifica, San Bruno, and South San Francisco.

== Terminals ==
Terminal map of SFO

The airport has four terminals (1, 2, 3, and International) and seven concourses with a total of 121 gates arranged alphabetically in a counterclockwise ring. Terminal 1 (B and C gates), Terminal 2 (D gates), and Terminal 3 (E and F gates) handle domestic and precleared flights. The International Terminal (A and G gates) handles international flights and some domestic flights.

Historically, the oldest terminal building still standing is Terminal 2, originally completed in 1954 as the Central Terminal, with four concourses (Piers B, C, D, and E, lettered sequentially from north to south). Terminal 1 was added as the South Terminal in 1963 with Piers F/FF (Pier F had two satellite rotundas) and G, and Pier E was reassigned to the South Terminal upon its completion. International traffic was routed through Pier G, and a new Rotunda G was completed in 1974 to expand it. Terminal 3 was added as the North Terminal in 1979, along with Pier A. Also, once the North Terminal was completed in 1979, the piers were renamed counterclockwise, with letter designations corresponding to present-day Boarding Areas, starting with Pier A (originally Pier G, later Rotunda A), Pier B (present-day Boarding Area B, originally Pier F/FF), Pier C (present-day Boarding Area C, originally Pier E), and Pier F (present-day Boarding Area F, originally Pier A). A new Pier E was added to the North Terminal in 1981 approximately where the old Pier B stood, and the Central Terminal was rebuilt with a single pier (D) to serve international flights in 1983, until a new International Terminal opened in 2000. Since then, the terminals were numbered in 2001, and the older terminals are undergoing renovation.

A rebuild of Terminal 2 (D gates, formerly the Central Terminal) was completed in 2011, followed by the rebuild of Terminal 3 East (E gates) in 2015. The Terminal 1 (B gates) rebuild was completed in 2024. A rebuild of Terminal 3 West (F gates) commenced in 2024, with full completion expected by 2029.

=== Airside connectors ===
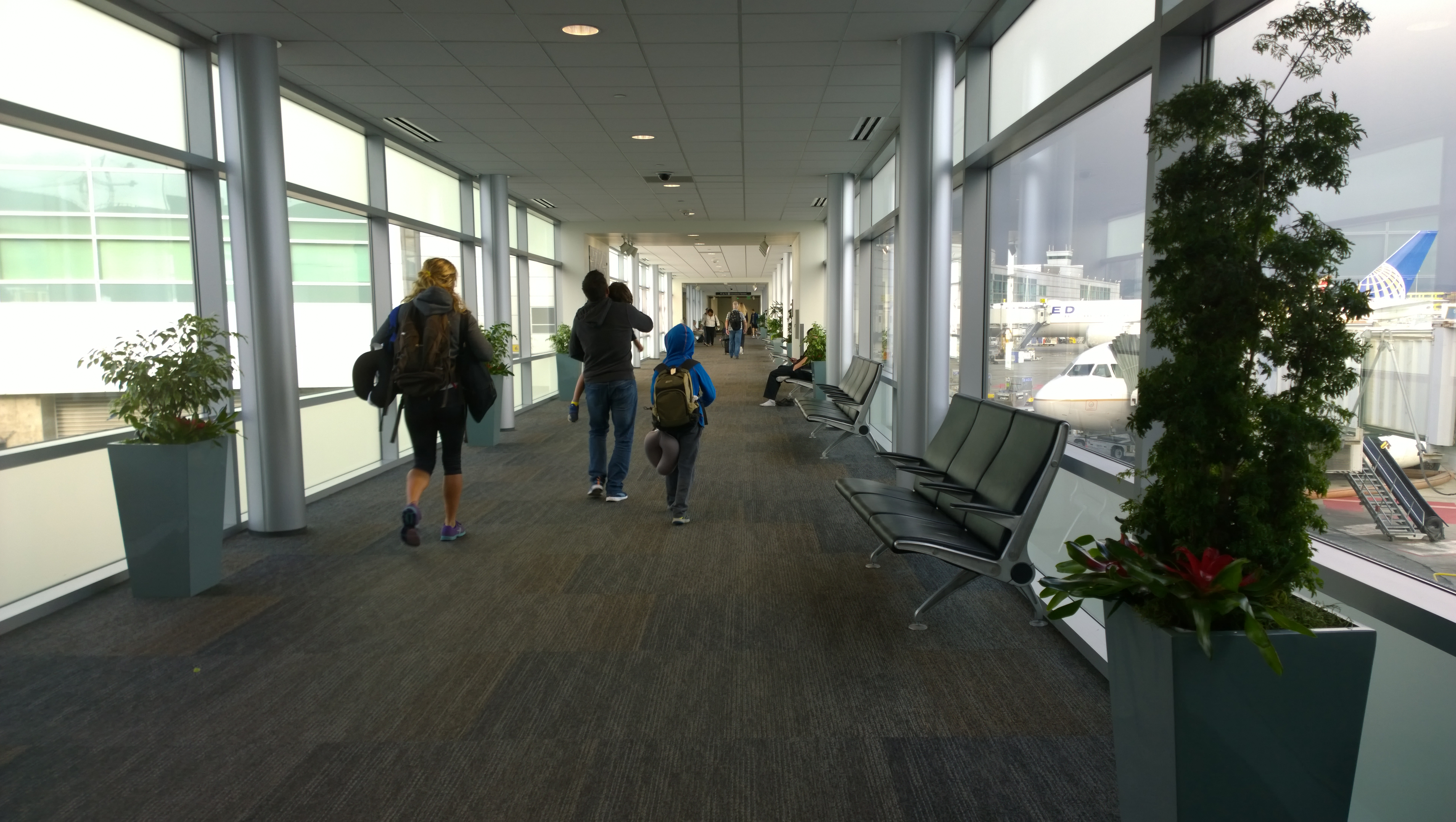
Airside connector between International Terminal and Terminal 3 in August 2017

There are airside connectors at SFO that enable passengers to move between adjacent terminal buildings while staying within the secure area. Since June 17, 2024 connectors are available between the A gates of International Terminal to Terminal 1, Terminal 1 to Terminal 2, Terminal 2 to Terminal 3, and Terminal 3 to the G gates of the International Terminal.

=== Harvey Milk Terminal 1 ===
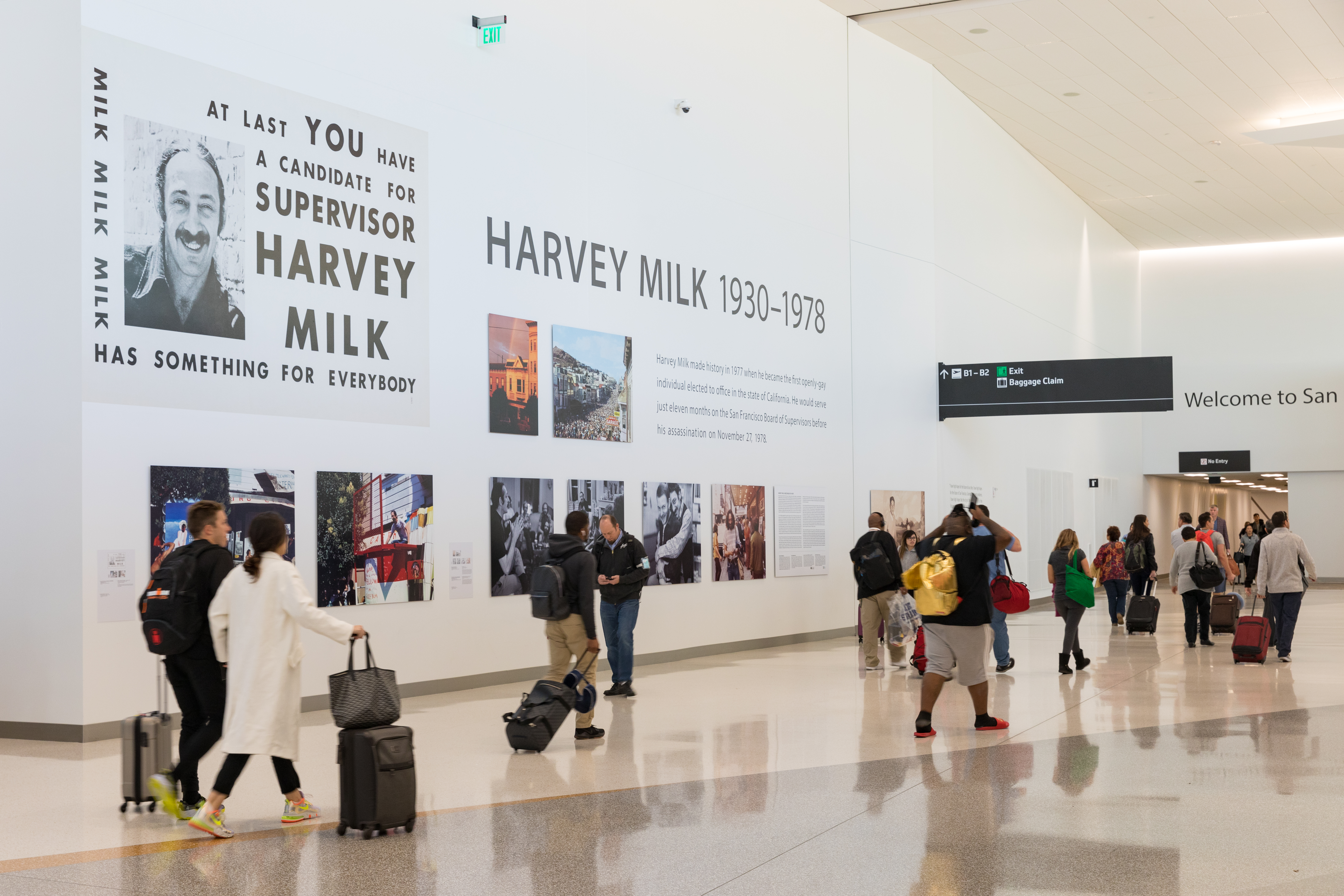
Artwork in November 2019 memorializing gay rights activist and former San Francisco supervisor Harvey Milk (1930–1978)

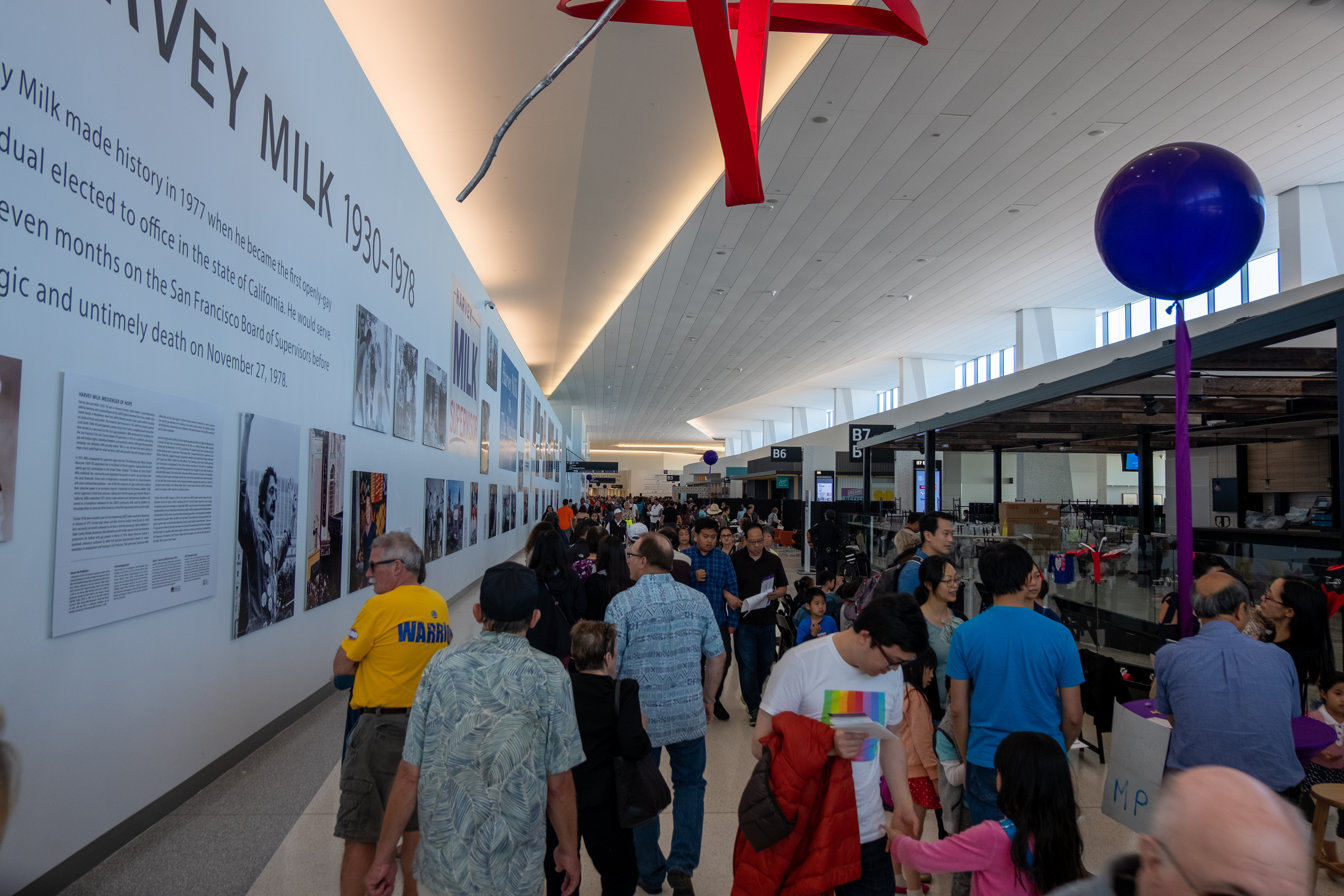
Harvey Milk Terminal 1 Community Day, July 2019

Formerly known as the South Terminal, Harvey Milk Terminal 1 is composed of Boarding Area B, which currently has 26 gates (gates B2-B27) and Boarding Area C, which has 11 gates (gates C1-C11). A third boarding area, Rotunda A, was demolished in early 2007 as the new International Terminal took over its functions. Terminal 1 is used by Aer Lingus, Alaska Airlines, American Airlines, Delta Air Lines, Frontier Airlines, Hawaiian Airlines, JetBlue, Porter Airlines, and Sun Country Airlines.

The South Terminal, which cost US$14,000,000 (equivalent to $147,230,000 in 2025), was initially dedicated on September 15, 1963. The terminal was designed by Welton Becket and Associates. When it opened, the South Terminal had three piers: Pier G (for international flights, approximately at the same location as the present-day Boarding Area (B/A) A in the International Terminal), Pier F/FF (used by Trans World Airlines (TWA) and Western Airlines, later renamed B/A B), and Pier E (used by American Airlines; originally part of Terminal 2, approximately at the present-day B/A C). The three-level Rotunda A addition was completed in 1974 at the end of Pier G. When the North Terminal was completed in 1979, Pier G was renamed Pier A, with the other piers renamed in a counterclockwise direction proceeding from the new Pier A. International flights were moved to the rebuilt Central Terminal (Terminal 2) in 1983, and then to the new International Terminal in 2000.

The South Terminal underwent a US$150,000,000 (equivalent to $408,340,000 in 2025) renovation designed by Howard A. Friedman and Associates, Marquis Associates and Wong & Brocchini that was completed in 1988. Terminal 1 then underwent a US$2,400,000,000 (equivalent to $3,219,630,000 in 2025) project to modernize the concourse and add gates; the project broke ground on June 29, 2016. The project to expand Boarding Area B includes demolishing the old TWA hangar and the two rotundas, and relocating two taxiways. The multi-phase project yielded a total of 27 gates when completed in 2024 including a secure Federal Inspection Services (FIS) connector to the existing customs facilities in the International Terminal. This effectively added six new gates that can handle international arrivals. A renovation of Boarding Area C was expected to begin after work on Boarding Area B was completed, but no plans were in place as of September 2024.

In April 2018, the San Francisco Board of Supervisors and mayor Mark Farrell approved and signed legislation renaming Terminal 1 after deceased gay rights activist and former member of the San Francisco Board of Supervisors Harvey Milk, and planned to install artwork memorializing him. This followed a previous attempt to rename the entire airport after him, which was turned down. Following the art and photo installation, the renamed terminal was opened to the media and public for preview tours in advance of its official opening on July 23, 2019. Harvey Milk Terminal 1 is the world's first airport terminal named after a leader of the LGBTQ community.

The first nine gates at the newly reconstructed Boarding Area B opened on July 23, 2019, with Southwest Airlines and JetBlue becoming the first tenants. In late-April 2020, the terminal's new lobby opened, with new ticket counters for Southwest and JetBlue, and a new permanent exhibit honoring Milk. On May 12, 2020, in conjunction with the launch of nine new gates at Boarding Area B (B19-B27), American Airlines moved into the new facility, with new ticket counters, baggage systems, and a new Admirals Club lounge. Seven gates (B2-B5, B10-B11, B15-B16) in the new terminal opened on May 25, 2021.

In 2022, Hawaiian Airlines and WestJet moved a few of their departures into the B gates. In June 2024, Alaska Airlines moved all of its operations from Terminal 2 to Harvey Milk Terminal 1 to be closer to its Oneworld partner American Airlines and opened an Alaska Lounge there in July 2024. Two gates (B3 and C1) also opened that month. In December 2024, Hawaiian Airlines moved its check-in counters and baggage claim from the International Terminal A to the Harvey Milk Terminal 1 as part of its merger with Alaska Airlines.

JetBlue operates two gates preferentially (B3 and B6), while American operates six of the nine new gates preferentially (B22-B27). Alaska Airlines operates ten gates in the terminal preferentially (B7-8, B10-11, B15-16, and B18-21). Three gates (B2, B4, and B5) are not assigned preferentially to any airline.

=== Terminal 2 ===
Formerly known as the Central Terminal, Terminal 2 comprises Boarding Area D, which has 14 gates (D1-D12 and D14-D16). Gate D13 does not exist as the number has been reserved for future development. Between June 23, 2020, and October 8, 2024, Boarding Area C was also considered part of Terminal 2. Terminal 2 is used by Air Canada, Breeze Airways, Southwest Airlines, some of United Airlines' domestic flights, and WestJet.

Terminal 2 opened in 1954 as the main airport terminal. After a drastic rebuilding designed by Gensler, it replaced Rotunda A as SFO's international terminal in 1983 until it was closed for renovation after the current international terminal opened in 2000. The initial plan was to convert Terminal 2 for domestic travel and reopen it by fall 2001. Still, the loss of passenger traffic after the terrorist attacks of September 11, 2001 put those plans on hold. The upper levels continued to be used as office spaces and for the airport's medical clinic, and the control tower remained in use.

On May 12, 2008, a US$383,000,000 (equivalent to $572,720,000 in 2025) renovation project was announced, including a new control tower, the use of green materials, a seismic retrofit, and an expansion from 10 to 14 gates. The terminal reopened for commercial travel on April 14, 2011, with Virgin America (later Alaska Airlines) and American Airlines sharing the new 14-gate common-use facility. Approximately a week earlier, on April 6, 2011, Virgin America's ceremonial flight VX2001 was the first to arrive at the renovated Terminal 2, an Airbus A320 bearing founder Richard Branson with other invited celebrity guests, such as Buzz Aldrin, Rachel Hunter, and Gavin Newsom. VX2001 had rendezvoused with White Knight Two/SpaceShipTwo over Point Reyes before making a side-by-side landing. The newly renovated terminal also designed by Gensler features permanent art installations from Janet Echelman, Kendall Buster, Norie Sato, Charles Sowers, and Walter Kitundu. Transition zones (the immediate post-security line area for "passenger recomposure") and exit areas (where disembarking passengers may be greeted) were designed with generous space. Terminal 2 set accolades by being the first U.S. airport to achieve LEED Gold status. Paolo Lucchesi, a local food critic, noted the sustainable food and dining program featuring local vendors and sources.

Following the construction of a new control tower in 2016, the tower and the offices above the terminal were demolished, and new office space was constructed in their place. On February 14, 2020, a new public, outdoor observation deck, called SkyTerrace, was opened in the new office space.

Until May 12, 2020, American's check-in counters were consolidated to T2, but its operations were split between Boarding Area D and Boarding Area C (linked via an airside connector). Following American's move to T1, the existing Admirals Club location was converted to an Alaska lounge, which has since closed.

Air Canada and Breeze Airways have moved into Terminal 2 during 2022-Q1. As a result, all check-ins and departures from Air Canada are no longer operating at the International Terminal. Since 2023, United Airlines has operated some flights out of Boarding Area D due to the Terminal 3 renovation project. In March 2025, Southwest Airlines moved all operations to Terminal 2.

=== Terminal 3 ===
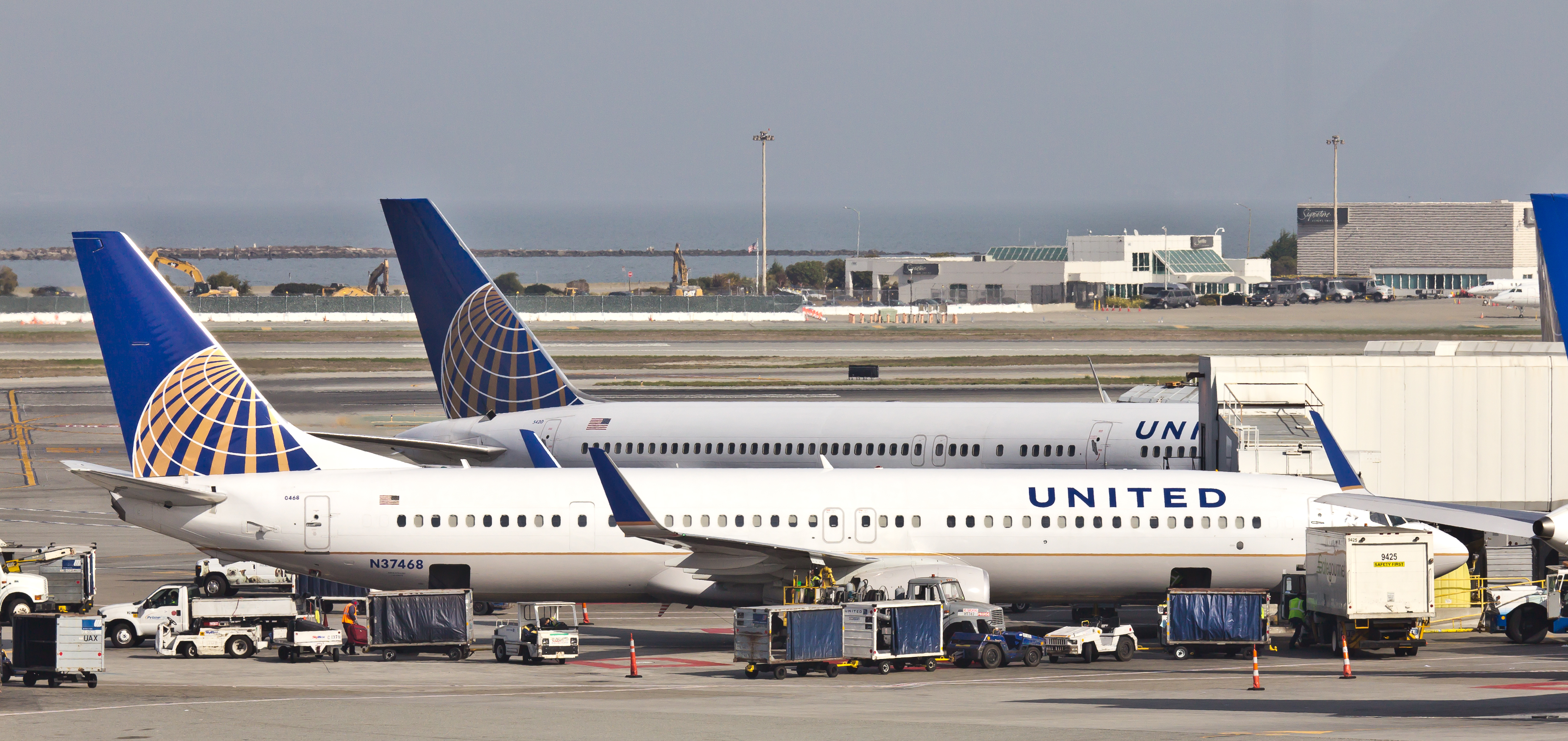
United Airlines planes sitting at their gates at Terminal 3 in January 2014

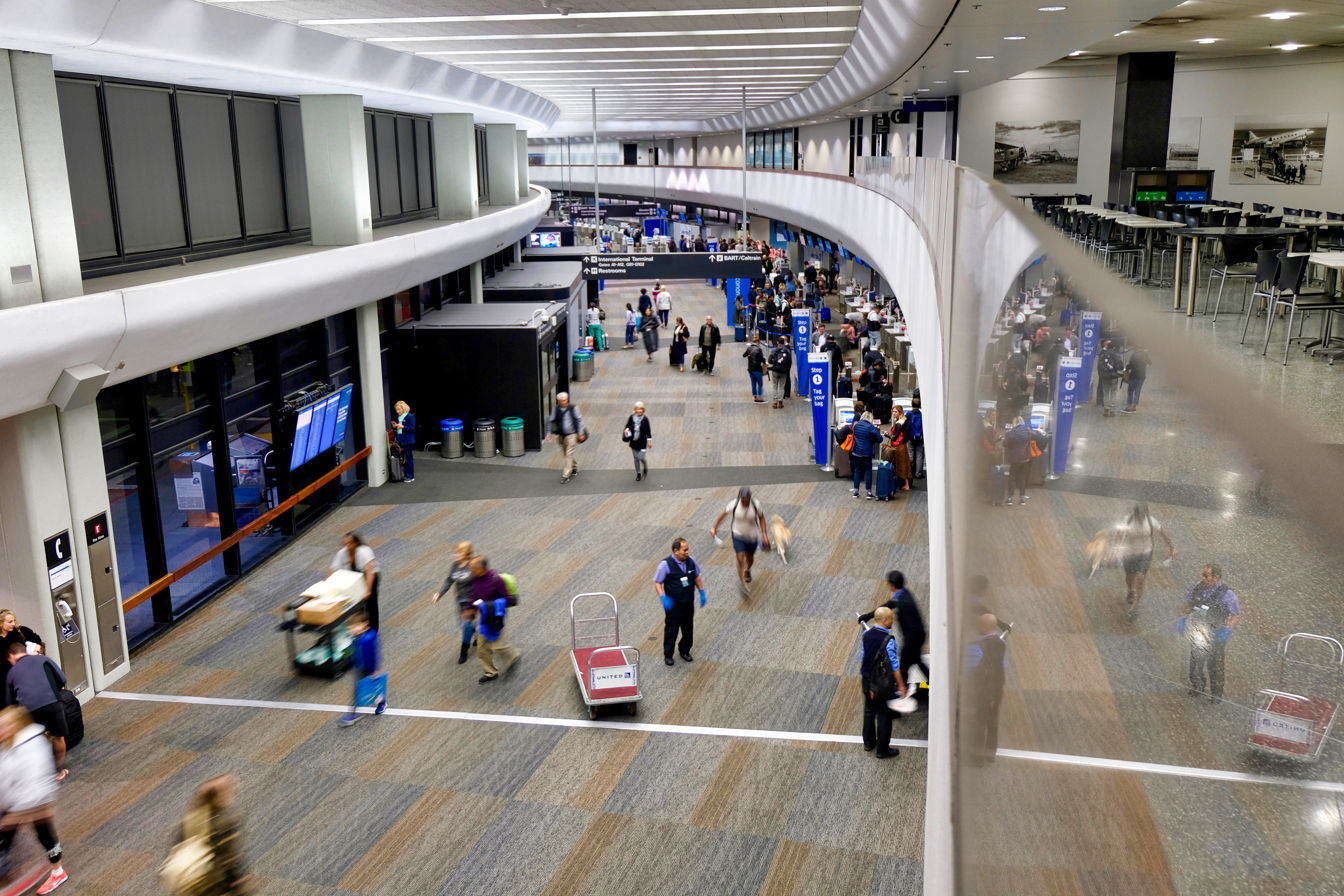
Terminal 3 interior (pictured in April 2018)

Formerly known as the North Terminal, Terminal 3 comprises Boarding Area E with 13 gates (gates E1-E13) and Boarding Area F with 18 gates (gates F5-F22). Terminal 3 is used for United Airlines' domestic flights. Mainline United and United Express flights use both boarding areas.

This $82.44 million terminal was originally designed by San Francisco Airport Architects (a joint venture of John Carl Warnecke and Associates, Dreyfuss + Blackford Architecture, and minority architects). The groundbreaking ceremony for the North Terminal was held on April 22, 1971, and Boarding Area F opened in 1979 and Boarding Area E opened in 1981. All terminals (except the International Terminal) were redesignated by number starting October 1, 2001.

A solar roof was installed in 2007 with sufficient generating capacity to power all the lights in Terminal 3 during the day. American Airlines and Air Canada occupied Boarding Area E until it closed for refurbishment in 2011 under the airport's FY 2010/11 – FY 2014/15 Capital Plan. Designed by Gensler, the renovation included architectural enhancements, structural work, HVAC system replacement, roof repair, and new carpeting. Initial modest renovation plans were replaced by a more ambitious project after the popularity of the remodeling of Terminal 2. After the completion of the US$138,000,000 (equivalent to $187,680,000 in 2025) project, Boarding Area E reopened on January 28, 2014, followed by Terminal 3 East on November 18. The project moved one gate from Boarding Area F to Boarding Area E to provide a total of ten aircraft parking positions at T3E. Following a 2019 renumbering of all gates at SFO, three additional gates moved from Boarding Area F to Boarding Area E, with the latter now containing 13 gates.

In 2020, airport officials postponed a planned renovation for Terminal 3 West. After a four-year delay, the $2.6 billion project broke ground in 2024. It will seismically retrofit part of Terminal 3, add international arrivals capabilities to up to four gates, renovate the check-in lobby, and expand the security checkpoint. The project also includes a replacement of the "bouncy" moving walkway in Terminal 3 that was installed in the 1970s using one continuous section of rubber.

There are two United Clubs in Terminal 3—one near the rotunda for Boarding Area F and another at the beginning of Boarding Area E. Terminal 3 also houses the American Express Centurion Lounge, located across from Gate F2.

=== Dianne Feinstein International Terminal ===
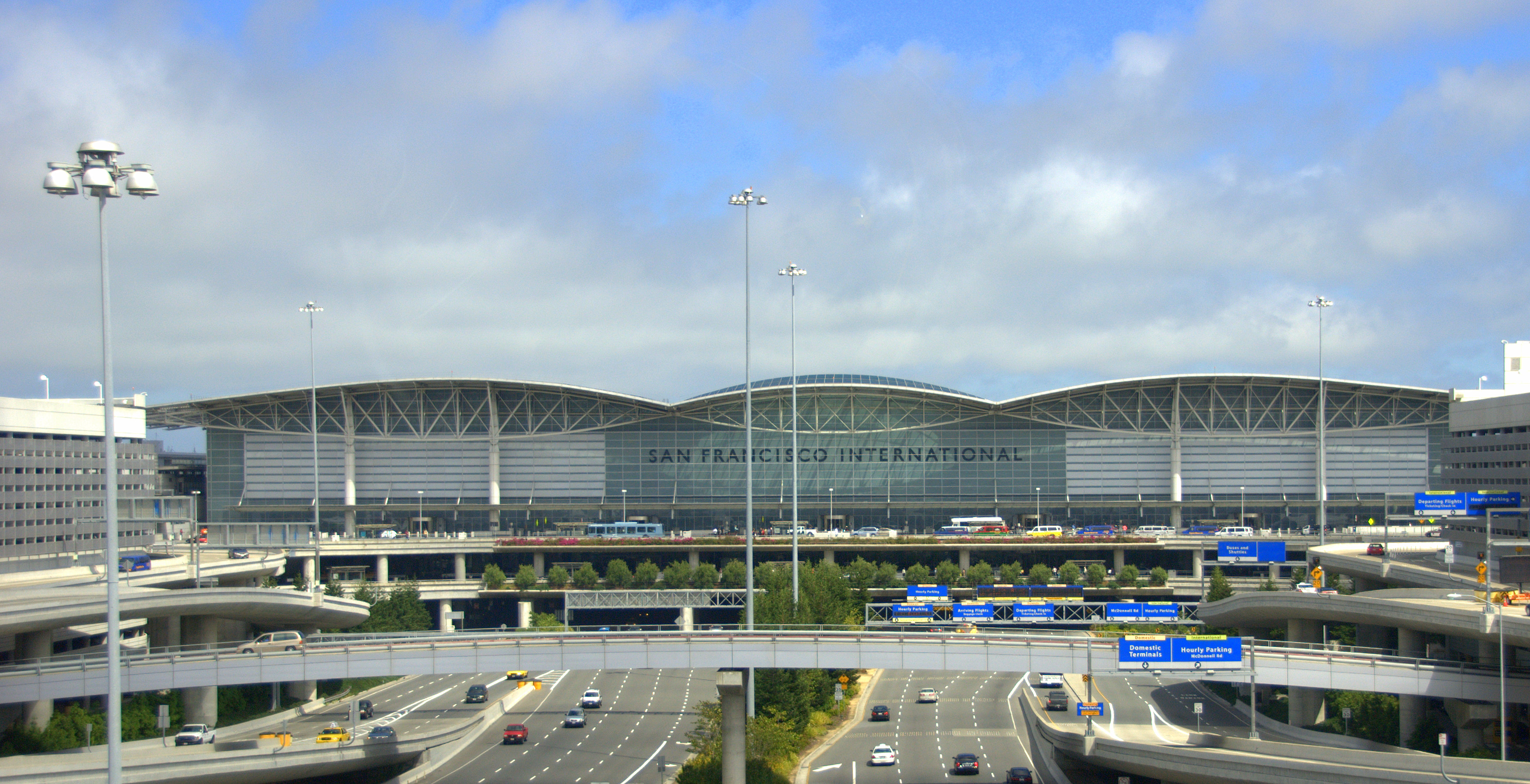
The International Terminal (pictured in August 2007)

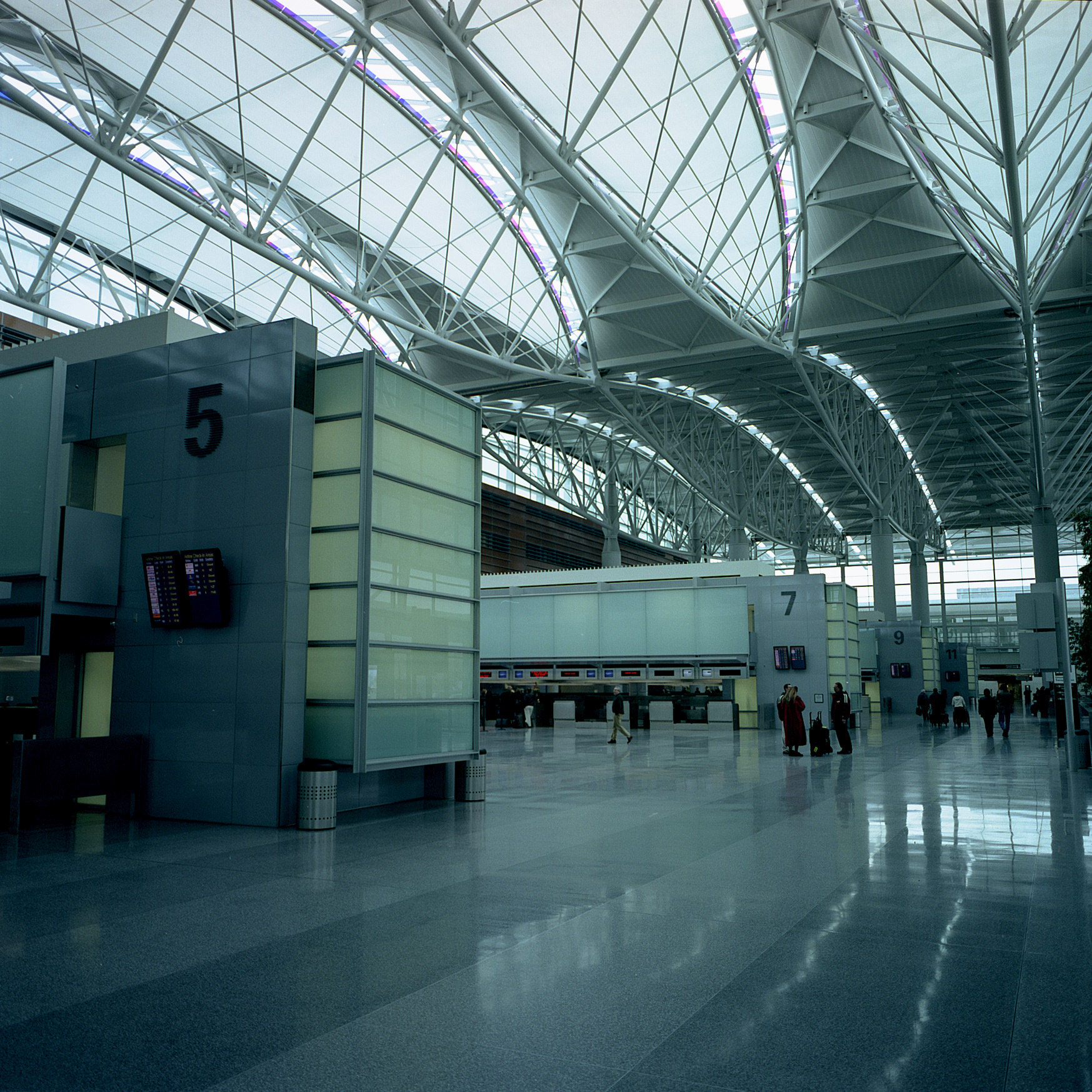
Interior of the International Terminal check-in area in September 2007

The Dianne Feinstein International Terminal is composed of Boarding Area A with 15 gates (A1-A15) and Boarding Area G with 14 gates (G1-G14). Designed by Craig W. Hartman of Skidmore, Owings and Merrill, the terminal opened in December 2000 to replace the International Departures section of Terminal 2. It is the largest international terminal in North America and the largest building in the world built on base isolators to protect against earthquakes. Food service focuses on quick service versions of leading San Francisco Bay Area restaurants, following other SFO terminals. Planners attempted to make the airport a destination in and of itself, not just for travelers passing through. The international terminal is a common-use facility, with all gates and all ticketing areas shared among international airlines and several domestic carriers. Common-use terminal equipment (CUTE) is used at check-in counters and gates. All international arrivals and departures are handled here (except flights from cities with customs preclearance). The International Terminal houses the airport's BART station, adjacent to the garage that leads to Boarding Area G. The SFO Medical Clinic is located next to the security screening area in Boarding Area A. All gates in this terminal have at least two jetway bridges, except gates A3 and A12, which have one. Gates A1 and A2 can accommodate two aircraft. Six of the gates are designed for the Airbus A380, making SFO one of the first airports in the world with such gates when it was built in 2000. Gate A11 has three jetways for boarding. Four other gates have two jetways fitted for A380 service.

The International Terminal completed a continuous ring of terminals by filling in the last remaining gap to the west of the then-existing terminals. Its geometry required that the terminal structure be built above the main access road, at enormous expense, with dedicated ramps connecting to Highway 101. The design and construction of the international terminal was by Skidmore, Owings & Merrill, Del Campo & Maru Architects, Michael Willis Associates, and built by Tutor Perini (main terminal building), Hellmuth, Obata, and Kassabaum in association with Robin Chiang & Company, Robert B. Wong Architects, and built by Tutor Perini (Boarding Area G), and Gerson/Overstreet Architects and built by Hensel Phelps Construction (Boarding Area A). The contracts were awarded after an architectural design competition.

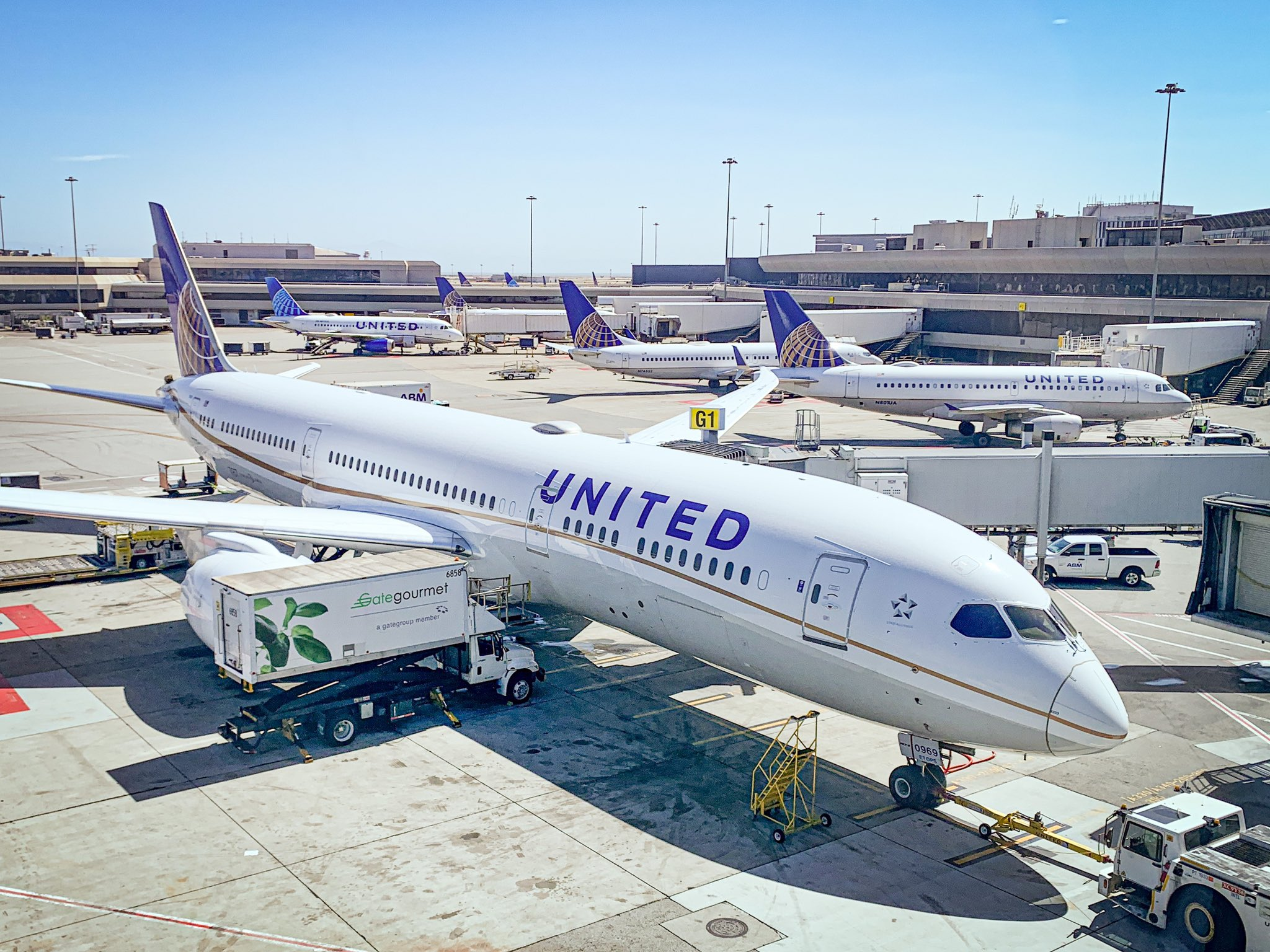
United Airlines planes at the International Terminal in July 2022

Boarding Area G is used by Star Alliance carriers Air China, Air New Zealand, All Nippon Airways, Lufthansa, Swiss International Air Lines, and all of United's international flights, as well as select United domestic flights. Most international flights operated by SkyTeam, Oneworld, and non-aligned international carriers board and deplane at Boarding Area A. Star Alliance carriers Air India, Asiana Airlines, Avianca El Salvador, Copa Airlines, EVA Air, ITA Airways, LOT Polish Airlines, Singapore Airlines, TAP Air Portugal, and Turkish Airlines also operate out of Boarding Area A. When all gates in an airline's designated international boarding area are full, passengers will board or deplane at the opposite international boarding area or, in the case of Boarding Area A, at the adjacent B gates. Aer Lingus, Flair Airlines, and WestJet operate from airports with United States border preclearance, allowing arriving passengers to skip the wait at customs and immigration at SFO and exit the airport from the departure level.

The two main designations for the International Terminal are "I" and "INTL" (abbreviations for "International"). Often, travel itineraries will say "T-I", which has led to instances where passengers misinterpret the "I" as Terminal 1, especially since both Boarding Area A and Boarding Area G are used for a limited number of domestic flights.

In 2024, the airport announced that the International Terminal would be renamed after the late senator and former mayor Dianne Feinstein. The departures main hall is already named after the late mayor Ed Lee.

== Law enforcement ==
Law enforcement at San Francisco International Airport is handled primarily by the Airport Bureau of the San Francisco Police Department. In addition to normal uniformed patrol of terminals, concourses, and parking lots, the SFPD provides canine patrols, explosive detection, vehicle collision investigations, cargo theft enforcement and security for visiting dignitaries. The SFPD operates alongside partner agencies, including the Transportation Security Administration (TSA), U.S. Customs and Border Protection (CBP), and the San Mateo Sheriff's Office.

During the second Trump administration, protestors encouraged the airport to do more to protect travelers as Immigration and Customs Enforcement agents detained and arrested travelers using their flight information.

== SFO Museum ==
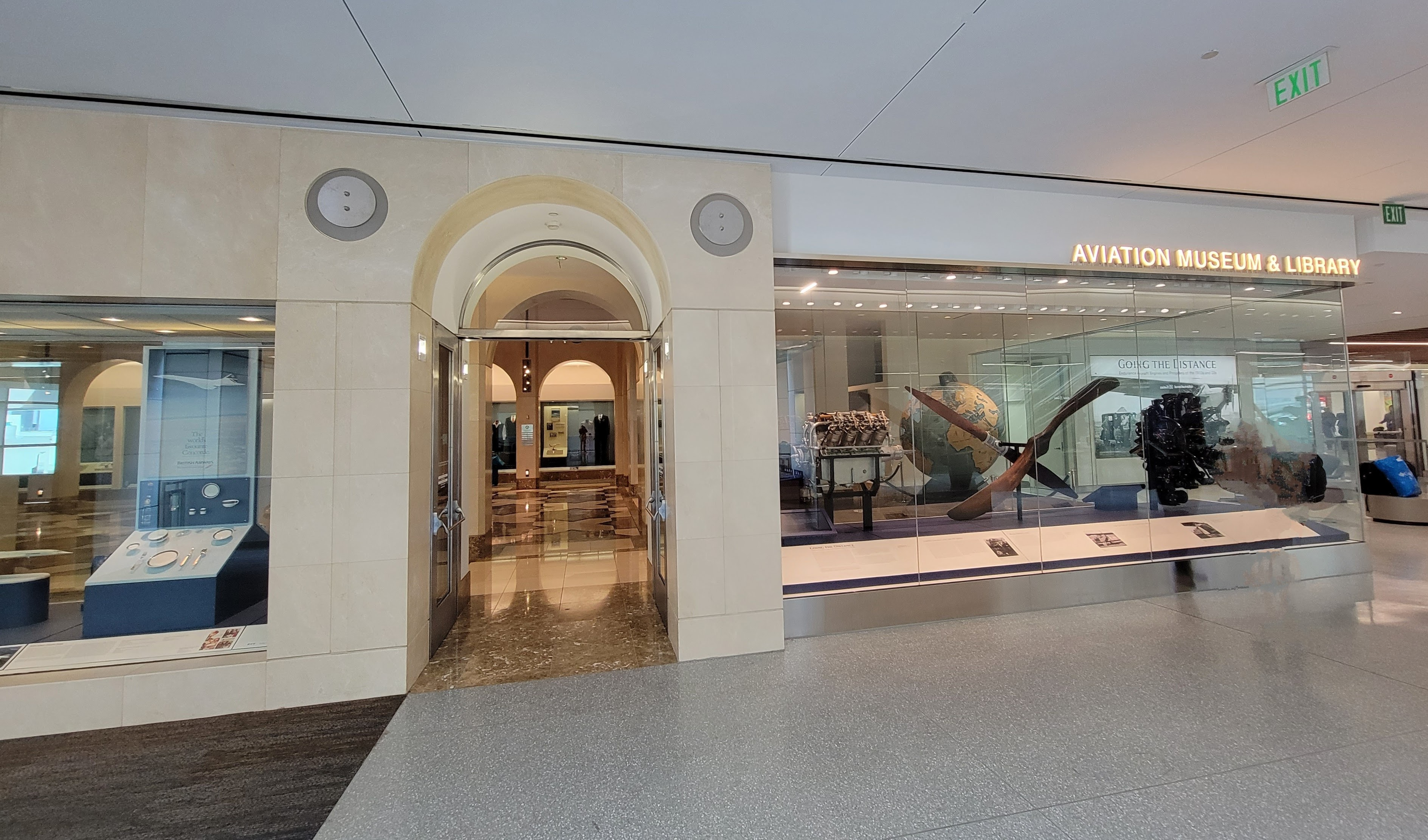
SFO Museum entrance in December 2023

SFO Museum was created in 1980 as a collaboration between the San Francisco Airport Commission and the Fine Arts Museums of San Francisco and was the first museum in an international airport. It was accredited by the American Alliance of Museums in 1999, and contains both permanent artwork and temporary exhibitions in more than 20 galleries. The Aviation Museum and Library (officially, the San Francisco Airport Commission Aviation Library and Louis A. Turpen Aviation Museum) is located in the International Terminal, featuring a model of a DC-3. Other prominent installations include works by:

- Robert Bechtle, San Francisco Nova (T3, boarding area E)
- Kendall Buster, Topograph (T2, departure lounge)
- Janet Echelman, Every Beating Second (T2, recomposure area)
- Joyce Kozloff, Bay Area Victorian, Bay Area Deco, Bay Area Funk; tile wall (IT–T1 connector)
- Seiji Kunishima, Stacking Stones (T2)
- Yayoi Kusama, High Heels for Going to Heaven (T1, b/a B)
- Ursula von Rydingsvard, Ocean Voices II (T3, E Plaza)
- Norie Sato, Air Over Under (T2, exterior)
- Larry Sultan and Mike Mandel, Waiting (IT, b/a A)
- Rufino Tamayo, Conquest of Space (IT, exterior)
- Wayne Thiebaud, 18th Street Downgrade (T3, b/a E)
- James Torlakson, Behind Ted McMann's Garage (T3, b/a E)
- Bob Zoell, BFILRYD (T3–IT connector)

Its primary Aviation Museum and Library is situated pre-security on the Departures Level of the International Terminal Main Hall, but it features over 25 rotating galleries spread across multiple post-security terminals as well.

Frequent travelers and airline staff have reportedly told SFO Museum officials they make it a point to arrive to the airport early in order to view the galleries.

== Airlines and destinations ==
=== Passenger ===
Airlines	Destinations
Aer Lingus	Dublin
Aeroméxico	Guadalajara, Mexico City–Benito Juárez
Air Canada	Montréal–Trudeau, Toronto–Pearson, Vancouver; Seasonal: Edmonton (begins May 1, 2027)
Air Canada Express	Vancouver
Air China	Beijing–Capital
Air France	Paris–Charles de Gaulle
Air India	Delhi
Air New Zealand	Auckland
Air Premia	Seoul–Incheon
Alaska Airlines	Boise, Everett, Honolulu, Kahului, Kailua-Kona, Las Vegas, Lihue, Los Angeles, New York–JFK, Orange County, Palm Springs, Portland (OR), Redmond/Bend, San Diego, San José del Cabo, Seattle/Tacoma, Spokane, Washington–National; Seasonal: Anchorage, Bozeman, Ixtapa/Zihuatanejo, Jackson Hole, Liberia (CR), Orlando, Puerto Vallarta
All Nippon Airways	Tokyo–Haneda, Tokyo–Narita
American Airlines	Charlotte, Chicago–O'Hare, Dallas/Fort Worth, Los Angeles, Miami, New York–JFK, Philadelphia, Phoenix–Sky Harbor
American Eagle	Los Angeles, Phoenix–Sky Harbor
Asiana Airlines	Seoul–Incheon (ends December 17, 2026)
Avianca El Salvador	San Salvador; Seasonal: Guatemala City
Breeze Airways	Louisville, Provo, Richmond, San Bernardino; Seasonal: Cincinnati
British Airways	London–Heathrow
Cathay Pacific	Hong Kong
China Airlines	Taipei–Taoyuan
China Eastern Airlines	Shanghai–Pudong
China Southern Airlines	Guangzhou, Wuhan
Condor	Seasonal: Frankfurt
Copa Airlines	Panama City–Tocumen
Delta Air Lines	Atlanta, Austin, Boston, Detroit, Los Angeles, Minneapolis/St. Paul, New York–JFK, Salt Lake City, Seattle/Tacoma
Delta Connection	Seattle/Tacoma
El Al	Tel Aviv
Emirates	Dubai–International
EVA Air	Taipei–Taoyuan
Fiji Airways	Nadi
Flair Airlines	Vancouver
French Bee	Papeete, Paris–Orly
Frontier Airlines	Atlanta, Dallas/Fort Worth, Denver, Las Vegas, Los Angeles, Ontario, Orange County, Phoenix–Sky Harbor, Salt Lake City, San Diego
Hawaiian Airlines	Honolulu, Kahului
Iberia	Seasonal: Madrid
ITA Airways	Rome–Fiumicino
Japan Airlines	Tokyo–Haneda, Tokyo–Narita
JetBlue	Boston, Fort Lauderdale, New York–JFK
KLM	Amsterdam
Korean Air	Seoul–Incheon
Level	Seasonal: Barcelona
LOT Polish Airlines	Seasonal: Warsaw–Chopin
Lufthansa	Frankfurt, Munich
Philippine Airlines	Manila
Porter Airlines	Toronto–Pearson
Qantas	Sydney–Kingsford Smith
Qatar Airways	Doha
Scandinavian Airlines	Copenhagen
Singapore Airlines	Singapore
Southwest Airlines	Austin, Baltimore, Burbank, Chicago–Midway, Dallas–Love, Denver, Kansas City, Las Vegas, Los Angeles, Nashville, Phoenix–Sky Harbor, San Diego, St. Louis
Starlux Airlines	Taipei–Taoyuan
Sun Country Airlines	Minneapolis/St. Paul
Swiss International Air Lines	Zurich
TAP Air Portugal	Lisbon; Seasonal: Terceira
Turkish Airlines	Istanbul
United Airlines	Albuquerque, Atlanta, Auckland, Austin, Baltimore, Beijing–Capital, Boise, Boston, Bozeman, Brisbane, Burbank, Calgary, Cancún, Chicago–O'Hare, Charleston (SC) (begins March 28, 2027), Cincinnati, Cleveland, Columbus–Glenn, Dallas/Fort Worth, Denver, Detroit, Eugene, Fort Lauderdale, Frankfurt, Hartford (begins March 28, 2027), Hong Kong, Honolulu, Houston–Intercontinental, Indianapolis, Jacksonville (FL) (begins March 29, 2027), Kahului, Kailua-Kona, Kansas City, Las Vegas, Lihue, London–Heathrow, Los Angeles, Manila, Medford, Melbourne, Mexico City–Benito Juárez, Miami, Minneapolis/St. Paul, Munich, Nashville, New Orleans, Newark, Norfolk (begins March 31, 2027), Omaha, Ontario, Orange County, Orlando, Osaka–Kansai, Palm Springs, Papeete, Paris–Charles de Gaulle, Philadelphia, Phoenix–Sky Harbor, Pittsburgh, Portland (OR), Puerto Vallarta, Raleigh/Durham, Redmond/Bend, Reno/Tahoe, Richmond (begins March 28, 2027), Salt Lake City, San Antonio, San Diego, San José (CR), San José del Cabo, San Luis Obispo, Santa Barbara, Seattle/Tacoma, Seoul–Incheon, Shanghai–Pudong, Singapore, St. Louis, Sydney–Kingsford Smith, Taipei–Taoyuan, Tampa, Tel Aviv (resumes March 28, 2027), Tokyo–Haneda, Tokyo–Narita, Toronto–Pearson, Vancouver, Washington–Dulles, Washington–National; Seasonal: Adelaide, Amsterdam, Anchorage, Barcelona, Belize City, Christchurch, Fort Myers, Jackson Hole, Liberia (CR), Montréal–Trudeau, Naha (begins March 27, 2027), Portland (ME), Rome–Fiumicino, Sapporo–Chitose (begins December 11, 2026), Spokane, Traverse City (begins June 19, 2027), West Palm Beach, Zurich
United Express	Albuquerque, Bakersfield, Bishop, Boise, Burbank, Eureka, Fresno, Medford, Minneapolis/St. Paul, Monterey, Monterrey, North Bend/Coos Bay, Oklahoma City (begins March 28, 2027), Orange County, Palm Springs, Portland (OR), Redding, Redmond/Bend, Reno/Tahoe, Sacramento, Salt Lake City, San Antonio, San Diego/Carlsbad, San Luis Obispo, Santa Barbara, Seattle/Tacoma, Spokane, St. Louis, Tri-Cities (WA), Tucson; Seasonal: Aspen, Eagle/Vail, Eugene, Glacier Park/Kalispell, Hayden/Steamboat Springs, Los Angeles, Missoula, Montrose, Ontario, Sun Valley
Vietnam Airlines	Ho Chi Minh City
Virgin Atlantic	London–Heathrow
WestJet	Calgary
Zipair Tokyo	Tokyo–Narita

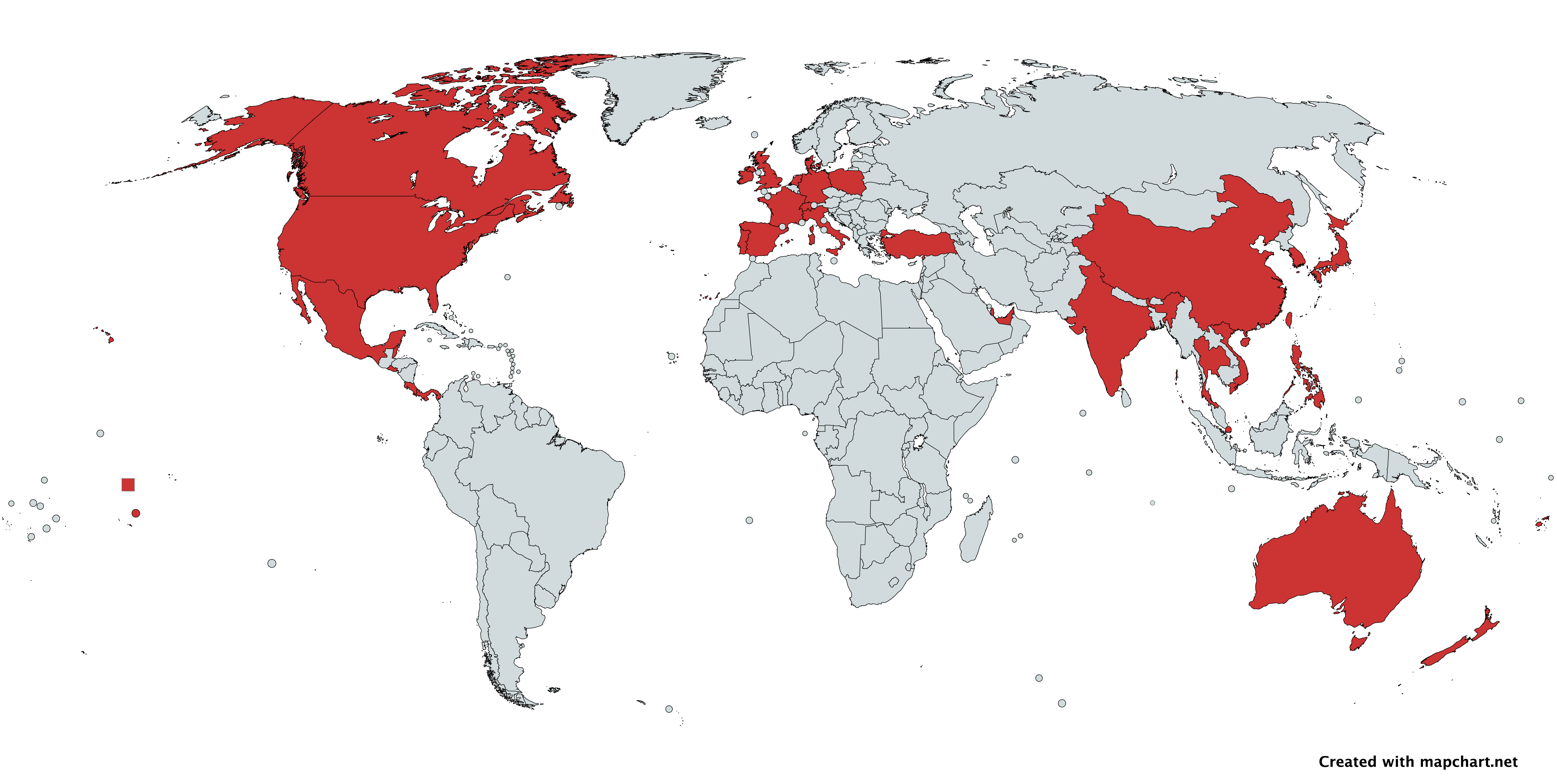
San Francisco International Airport passenger destinations

=== Cargo ===
Airlines	Destinations	Refs
ABX Air	Cincinnati, Los Angeles	
Amazon Air	Cincinnati, Fort Worth/Alliance	
AirZeta	Los Angeles, Seoul–Incheon	
China Airlines Cargo	Anchorage, Atlanta, Taipei–Taoyuan; Seasonal: Billings	
DHL Aviation	Cincinnati, Los Angeles, Seattle/Tacoma	
EVA Air Cargo	Los Angeles, Taipei–Taoyuan	
FedEx Express	Fort Worth/Alliance, Memphis	
Kalitta Air	Los Angeles, Seoul–Incheon	
Korean Air Cargo	Los Angeles, Seoul–Incheon	

== Statistics ==
=== Top destinations ===
Busiest domestic routes from SFO (September 2025 – August 2026)
Rank	City	Passengers	Carriers
1	Los Angeles, California	1,426,144	Alaska, American, Delta, Frontier, Southwest, United
2	Chicago–O'Hare, Illinois	986,287	American, United
3	New York–JFK, New York	956,137	Alaska, American, Delta, JetBlue
4	Newark, New Jersey	873,443	Alaska, United
5	Denver, Colorado	834,963	Frontier, Southwest, United
6	Las Vegas, Nevada	825,349	Alaska, Frontier, Southwest, United
7	Seattle/Tacoma, Washington	813,678	Alaska, Delta, United
8	San Diego, California	791,220	Alaska, Frontier, Southwest, United
9	Boston, Massachusetts	707,856	Alaska, Delta, JetBlue, United
10	Dallas/Fort Worth, Texas	657,871	American, Frontier, United

Busiest international routes from SFO (September 2025 – August 2026)
Rank	Airport	Passengers	Carriers
1	Taipei–Taoyuan, Taiwan	1,255,633	China Airlines, EVA Air, Starlux Airlines, United
2	London–Heathrow, United Kingdom	1,032,821	British Airways, United, Virgin Atlantic
3	Hong Kong, Hong Kong	904,957	Cathay Pacific, United
4	Seoul–Incheon, South Korea	754,925	Air Premia, Asiana Airlines, Korean Air, United
5	Vancouver, Canada	729,498	Air Canada, Flair Airlines, United, WestJet
6	Manila, Philippines	614,971	Philippine Airlines, United
7	Tokyo–Narita, Japan	605,825	All Nippon Airways, Japan Airlines, United, ZIPAIR Tokyo
8	Frankfurt, Germany	581,894	Condor, Lufthansa, United
9	Toronto–Pearson, Canada	526,328	Air Canada, Porter Airlines, United
10	Singapore, Singapore	501,798	Singapore Airlines, United

=== Airline market share ===
Largest airlines at SFO (September 2025 – August 2026)
Rank	Airline	Passengers	Share
1	United Airlines	26,959,835	50.9%
2	Alaska Airlines	4,355,618	8.2%
3	Delta Air Lines	4,155,172	7.9%
4	American Airlines	3,751,633	7.1%
5	Southwest Airlines	2,512,769	4.7%
–	Other	11,200,000	21.1%

=== Traffic numbers ===
Traffic by calendar year
Year	Rank	Enplaned and deplaned passengers	Change	Aircraft movements	Cargo (tonnes)
1998	—	40,101,387	—	432,046	598,579
1999	—	40,387,538	▲0.7%	438,685	655,409
2000	9	41,048,996	▲1.8%	429,222	695,258
2001	14	34,632,474	▼15.6%	387,594	517,124
2002	19	31,450,168	▼9.2%	351,453	506,083
2003	22	29,313,271	▼6.8%	334,515	483,413
2004	21	32,744,186	▲8.8%	353,231	489,776
2005	23	33,394,225	▲2.0%	352,871	520,386
2006	26	33,581,412	▲0.5%	359,201	529,303
2007	23	35,790,746	▲6.6%	379,500	503,899
2008	21	37,402,541	▲4.5%	387,710	429,912
2009	20	37,453,634	▲0.1%	379,751	356,266
2010	23	39,391,234	▲5.2%	387,248	384,179
2011	22	41,045,431	▲4.2%	403,564	340,766
2012	22	44,477,209	▲8.4%	424,566	337,357
2013	22	44,944,201	▲1.2%	421,400	325,782
2014	21	47,074,162	▲4.9%	431,633	349,585
2015	15	50,067,094	▲6.2%	429,815	389,934
2016	23	53,106,505	▲6.1%	450,388	420,086
2017	24	55,832,518	▲5.1%	460,343	491,162
2018	25	57,793,313	▲3.5%	470,164	500,081
2019	24	57,488,023	▼0.5%	458,496	546,437
2020	50	16,427,801	▼71.4%	231,163	439,358
2021	41	24,343,627	▲48.2%	265,597	528,792
2022	24	42,281,641	▲73.7%	355,006	491,192
2023	29	50,196,094	▲18.7%	384,871	484,100
2024	36	52,288,098	▲4.1%	386,507	561,594
2025	32	54,532,613	▲4.3%	416,288	537,115

== Ground transportation ==
=== Transit ===
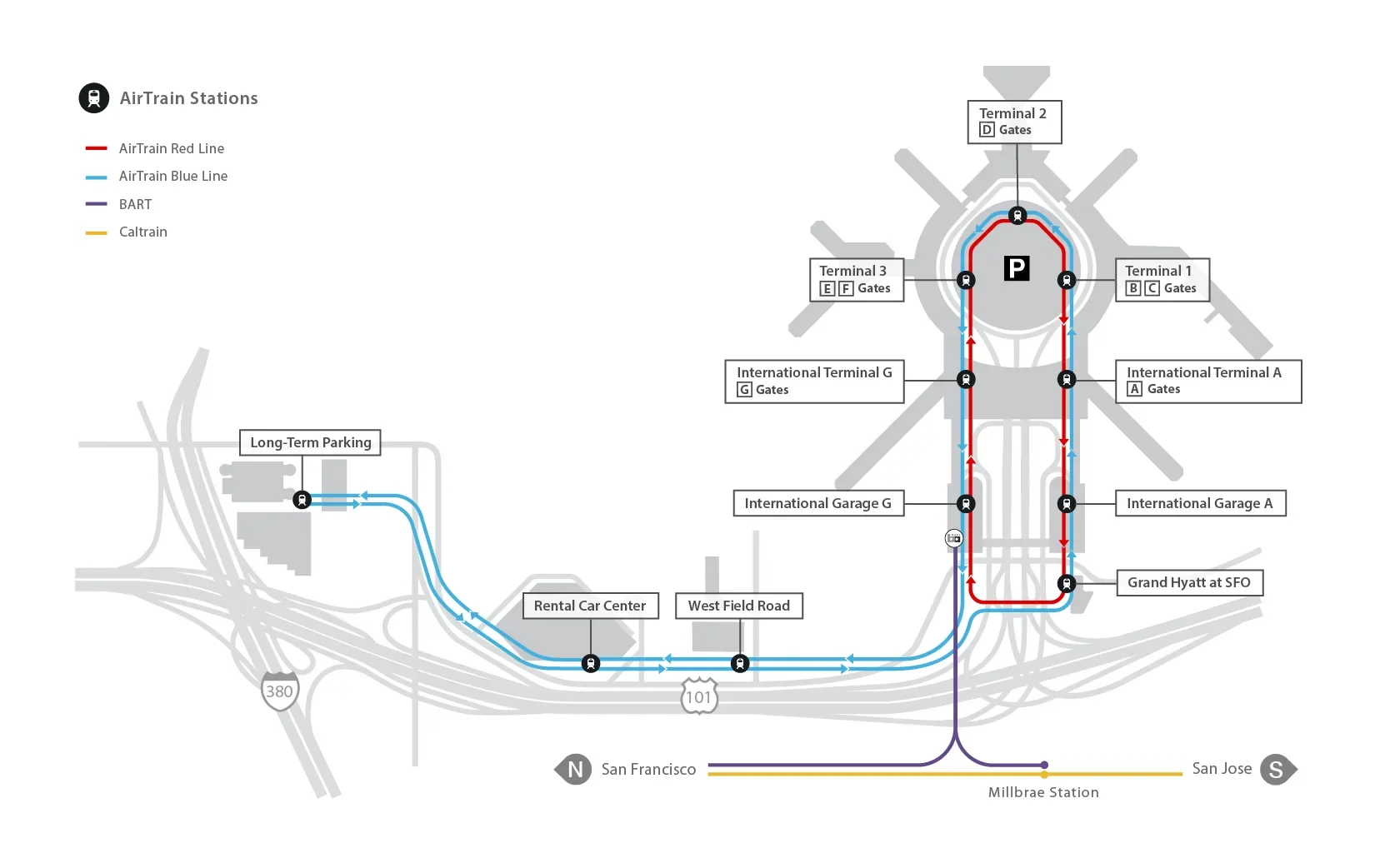
Map of rail services at SFO

The AirTrain is a landside people-mover system that connects each terminal, the two international terminal garages, the BART station, the Grand Hyatt hotel, the airport's Rental Car Center, and the Long-Term Parking garage. The AirTrain is fully automated and free to ride.

Bay Area Rapid Transit (BART) serves the airport at San Francisco International Airport station, located west of the International Terminal. The trains connect the airport directly to San Francisco, Oakland, and numerous other cities across the San Francisco Bay Area.

San Mateo County's transit agency, SamTrans, serves the airport with several routes. Buses stop at the arrivals/baggage claim level of the domestic terminals and in courtyard A or G in the International Terminal.

BART trains and SamTrans buses also connect San Francisco International Airport to Caltrain with a transfer at Millbrae station. Millbrae will also be the connection between SFO and California High-Speed Rail; the station will be renamed to Millbrae–SFO station on the High Speed Rail line to coincide with the dual functionality of the station.

Prior to the COVID-19 pandemic, the airport provided free shuttle bus service to and from the South San Francisco Ferry Terminal, connecting with San Francisco Bay Ferry services from Alameda and Oakland. This service is no longer active.

Numerous parking and hotel courtesy shuttles stop at the center transportation island on the departure level, while Marin Airporter buses and limousines are on the arrivals/baggage claim level of the airport. Charter services are also available in the courtyards.

=== Car ===
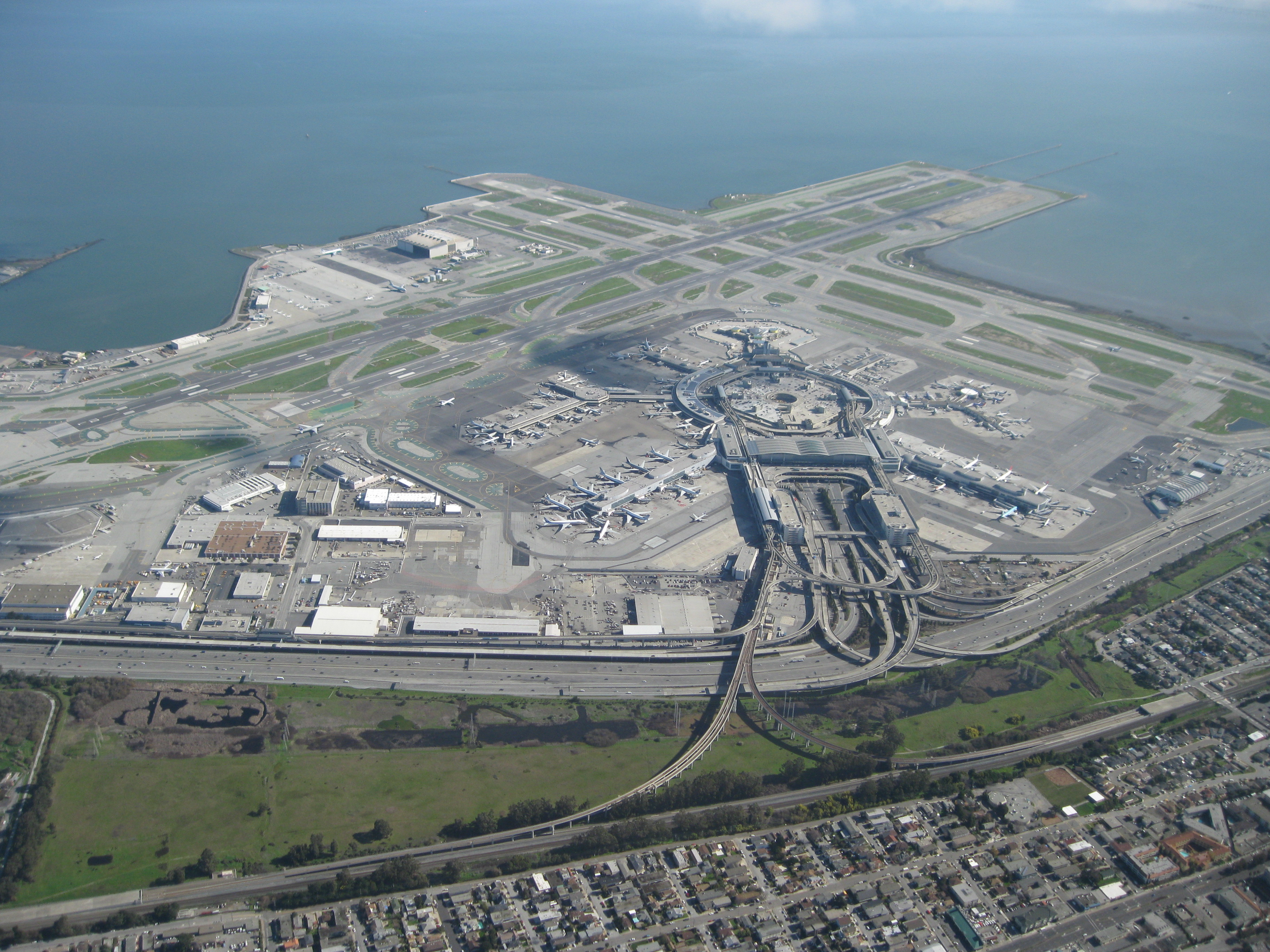
Bird's-eye view of the airport in February 2010. A spaghetti junction connects the passenger terminal roads to US Route 101.

The airport is located on U.S. Route 101, 13 miles (21 km) south of downtown San Francisco. It is near the US 101 interchange with Interstate 380, a short freeway that connects US 101 with Interstate 280. Short term parking is located in the central terminal area and two international terminal garages. Long term parking is located on South Airport Blvd. and San Bruno Ave.

Passengers can also park long-term at a select number of BART stations that have parking lots, with a permit purchased online in advance.

=== Taxi ===
Taxis depart from designated taxi zones located at the roadway center islands, on the Arrivals/Baggage Claim Level of all terminals.

Ride app services such as Uber and Lyft are available via their respective mobile app. The designated ride app pickup area for domestic terminals is on the fifth floor of the adjacent garage. The designated pickup area for the International Terminal is on the Departures/Check-In Level roadway center island.

Autonomous rides are offered to and from the Rental Car Center.

== Other facilities ==
SFO is home to one of the largest single aircraft maintenance bases in the world with complete MRO base operations, including maintenance, repair, overhaul, painting, welding, machine shop, tool and die, parts manufacturing, fabrication, engineering, and retrofitting (Boeing and Airbus certified, among others). It serves as the principal Global MRO Base for United Airlines and serves over 40 other airlines, military customers, and aircraft lease operators.

The eastern side of the airfield is dominated by the Superbay, a 420,550-square-foot (39,070 m^{2}) maintenance hangar capable of holding four 747s. Originally constructed in the 1970s, the facility is shared by United Airlines and American Airlines.

Nippon Cargo Airlines has its San Francisco branch on the airport property.

Prior to its merger that formed AirWest, Pacific Air Lines had its corporate headquarters on the grounds of the airport. Hughes Airwest, the successor to Air West, also had its headquarters on the grounds of the airport.

The United States Coast Guard operates Coast Guard Air Station San Francisco with its ramp and buildings near the cargo terminal, operating six MH-65 Dolphin helicopters.

The United States Postal Service had an Air Mail Facility (AMF), later an International Service Center (ISC) located on Airport property. However, the post office was closed in 2022, after its lease was not renewed by the airport.

=== On-site hotel ===
In October 2019, Hyatt Hotels opened a 351-room Grand Hyatt-branded hotel next to International Garage A and connected to the terminals via AirTrain.

=== Wag Brigade ===
On December 3, 2013, SFO launched a "Wag Brigade" program to bring a pack of trained therapy dogs to the terminals to calm nervous fliers and make passenger travel more enjoyable. In 2016, Lilou, a Juliana-breed therapy pig joined the Wag Brigade. Carefully selected for their temperament and airport suitability, the comfort canines wear vests that read "Pet Me!" which identify them.

== Accidents and incidents ==
- On February 9, 1937, a United Airlines Douglas DC-3A-197 transport liner circled the airport, then crashed into the bay, killing 11 people.
- On September 12, 1951, United Airlines Flight 7030 plunged into the bay during a training exercise killing all three crew members.
- On April 20, 1953, Western Airlines Flight 636, a Douglas DC-6 on a scheduled evening crossbay flight to Oakland International Airport, crashed three minutes after departing SFO into San Francisco Bay. There were eight fatalities (4 crew, 4 passengers) of the 10 occupants on board.
- On October 29, 1953, British Commonwealth Pacific Airlines Flight 304, a Douglas DC-6 en route from Sydney, Australia, with fuel stops in Auckland, New Zealand, Fiji, and Honolulu, crashed on approach to SFO into Kings Mountain in San Mateo County. All 19 passengers and crew members died.
- On February 20, 1959, a Pan American DC-7C crashed and burned on the runway. The three crew members on board survived.
- On February 3, 1963, Slick Airways Flight 40 crashed and burned after striking approach lights on runway 28R, killing the four people on board.
- On December 24, 1964, Flying Tiger Line Flight 282, a Lockheed Constellation cargo aircraft departing for New York City, crashed in the hills west of the airport, killing all three crew members on board.
- On June 28, 1965, Pan Am Flight 843, a Boeing 707, had just departed for Honolulu, Hawaii, when its #4 engine exploded, causing part of the wing and the engine itself to break off and fall into the streets below. The crew was able to extinguish the ensuing fire and land safely at the nearby Travis Air Force Base.

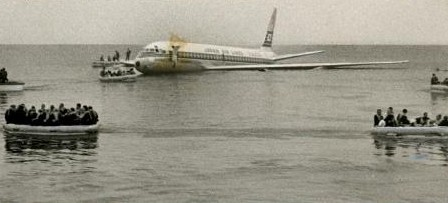
JAL002 crashed into shallow water short of SFO

- On November 22, 1968, Japan Air Lines Flight 2, a DC-8-62 named the Shiga (registered as JA8032), crash-landed on final approach at 9:30 a.m. on a shallow submerged reef at the eastern tip of Coyote Point (three miles short of the runway southeast of the airport). The plane was on a trip from Tokyo to San Francisco, after making a stop in Honolulu. The pilot was experienced but misread the instruments on the DC-8, which was less than a year old. There were 107 people on the plane. There were no deaths or serious injuries. The plane was salvaged by Bigge Drayage Company soon after the crash. All luggage and fuel were removed to cut the weight and the plane was lifted onto a barge and taken to the airport for repairs. The cost of repairs was $4 million and the plane re-entered service the following April. The aircraft flew for Japan Air Lines until 1983 and then several air freight companies for 18 years until it was scrapped in December 2001.
- On July 30, 1971, Pan Am Flight 845, a Boeing 747 (registration: N747PA, name: Clipper America), struck navigational aids at the end of runway 1R on takeoff for Tokyo. The aircraft's landing gear and other systems were damaged. Two passengers were seriously injured by metal components of the runway approach light pier entering the cabin. The flight proceeded out over the Pacific Ocean to dump fuel to reduce weight for an emergency landing. Emergency services were deployed at the airport, and the plane returned and landed on runway 28R. During landing, the aircraft veered off the runway. There was no fire. After coming to a stop, the aircraft slowly tilted aft, coming to rest on its tail in a nose-high attitude. The forward evacuation slides were therefore in a nearly vertical position. Evacuation using these slides caused all of additional injuries, some severe. There were no fatalities among the 218 passengers and crew members aboard. An investigation determined that the cause of the accident was erroneous information from the flight dispatcher to the crew members regarding weight and runway length.
- On July 5, 1972, Pacific Southwest Airlines Flight 710, a Boeing 737-200, was hijacked by two Bulgarian immigrants demanding $800,000 and to be taken to the Soviet Union. After flying for an hour and landing back at SFO, the plane was stormed by four FBI agents. Both hijackers were killed along with one passenger. Two other passengers were injured.
- On September 13, 1972, TWA Flight 604, a Boeing 707-331C cargo plane crashed into the bay on takeoff. All three crew members survived.
- On October 8, 1984, a Clay Lacy Aviation Learjet 24 crashed shortly after takeoff after descending in a steep left-wing low-nose attitude after entering a broken cloud at 600 feet. All three occupants (two crew, and one occupant) were killed.
- On February 19, 1985, China Airlines Flight 006 made an emergency landing at the airport after a fatigued crew mishandled a single engine flameout, eventually leading to a stall and catastrophic dive that nearly led the Boeing 747SP to hit the ocean.
- On June 28, 1998, United Airlines Flight 863 was forced to shut down an engine just after takeoff, and then nearly collided with San Bruno Mountain due to improper flight procedure. The aircraft returned safely to the airport. In response, United instituted new training procedures for its flight crews.
- In the September 11 attacks in 2001, United Airlines Flight 93 was destined for San Francisco. It was hijacked by four al-Qaeda terrorists and diverted towards Washington, D.C., with the intent of crashing the plane into either The Capitol or the White House. After learning of the previous attacks on the World Trade Center and The Pentagon, the passengers attempted to regain control of the plane. The hijackers subsequently crashed the plane into a field in Somerset County, Pennsylvania, killing everyone on board.
- On May 26, 2007, an arriving SkyWest Airlines Embraer EMB 120 nearly collided with a Republic Airline Embraer 170 Regional Jet at the junction of Runways 01L and 28R. After the SkyWest EMB 120 passed the Runway 28R threshold, the Republic E-170 was cleared for takeoff on 01L, in contradiction to local and FAA orders requiring the arriving aircraft to pass the intersection before clearing departing aircraft on the intersecting runway.
- On June 28, 2008, an ABX Air Boeing 767 preparing to depart with cargo caught fire and was seriously damaged. The pilots escaped uninjured. Although the airline had received a threat the week before, investigations revealed no evidence of any malicious device on board, eventually concluding the fire was caused by an electrical system malfunction.
- On September 22, 2012, a PrimeFlight catering truck accidentally drove into the wing of a parked NetJets Gulfstream V. The wing sliced into the cab of the truck, killing the 60-year-old driver.

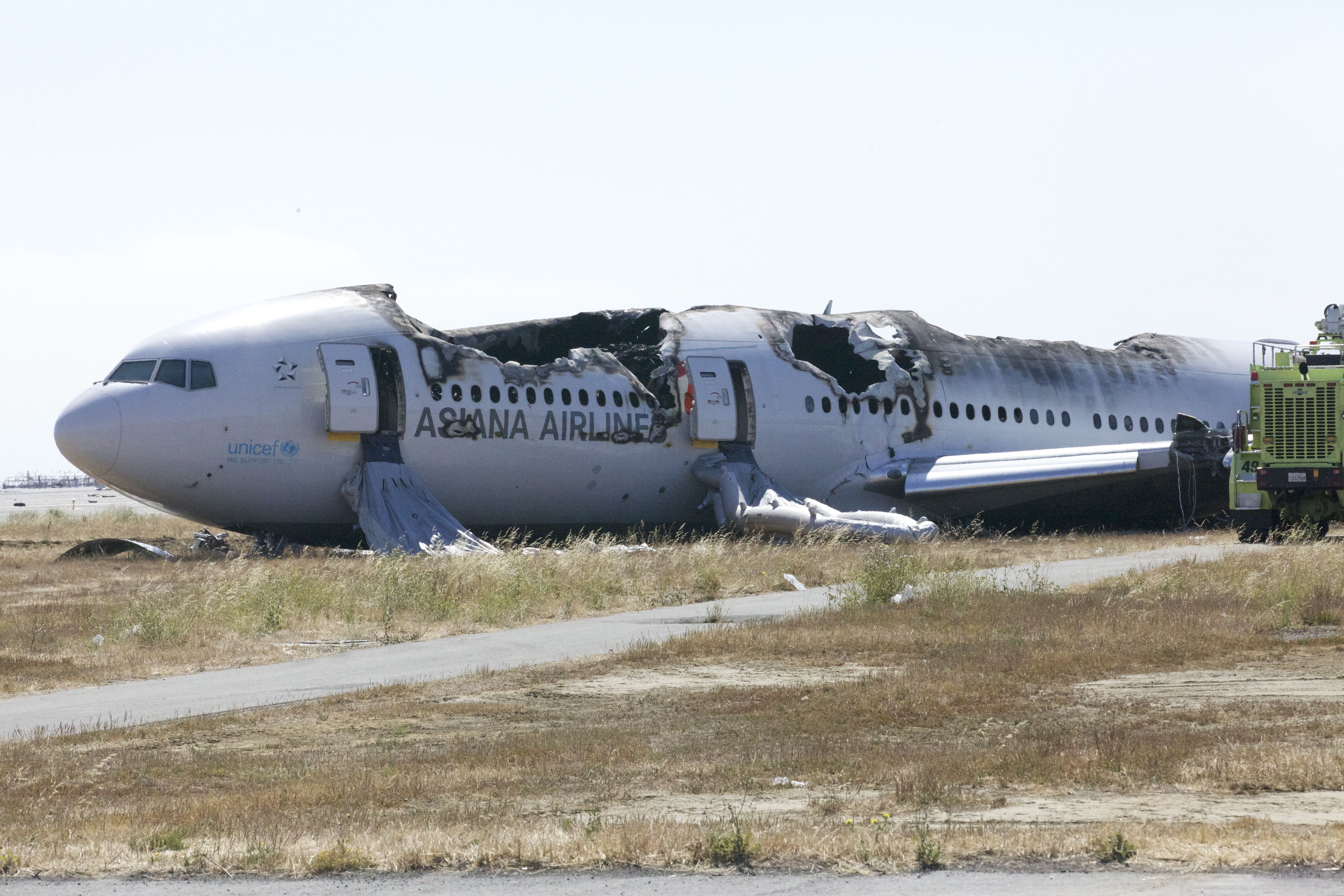
The wreckage of Asiana Airlines Flight 214 after it crashed while landing on July 6, 2013

- On July 6, 2013, Asiana Airlines Flight 214, a Boeing 777-200ER registered HL7742, crashed while landing. The crash occurred due to a combination of mistakes made by the aircraft's flight crew. The flight crew had selected an incorrect autopilot mode when attempting to descend, followed by placing the thrust levers into "idle", which disabled the autopilot from maintaining speed as the aircraft approached the seawall. Upon descending below the desired flight path, the flight crew should have determined that their speed was too low and attempted a "go-around" and re-attempt to land. However, this decision was not made until the altitude was less than 100 feet (30 m), by which point the aircraft could not accomplish a go-around. The tail section of the aircraft struck the seawall at the end of the runway and became detached from the airframe; the plane ended up 2,000 feet (610 m) down the runway. Passengers and crew members evacuated before a fire, due to the ignition of engine lubricant, destroyed the aircraft. There were three fatalities, making this the first fatal Boeing 777 crash.
- On July 7, 2017, Air Canada Flight 759, an Airbus A320-200, from Toronto Pearson was instructed by air traffic control to go around after overflying Taxiway C for 0.25 miles (400 m) while on visual approach for 28R. The A320 overflew the first two aircraft lined up on Taxiway C by roughly 100 feet (30 m). The pilots landed the aircraft afterward without incident. A total of three wide-body aircraft and one narrow-body aircraft were lined up awaiting takeoff on Taxiway C. The NTSB launched an investigation into the incident, publishing the final report in September 2018.
- On October 22, 2017, Air Canada Flight 781, another Airbus A320-200, from Montreal landed on Runway 28R after being instructed by the ATC six times to go around, without any response from the pilots. Upon landing the crew reported they had radio problems in the cockpit, but a later FAA investigation found that the crew inadvertently switched from the SFO tower frequency to the SFO ground frequency after receiving their landing clearance.
- On March 7, 2024, a Boeing 777-200ER of United Airlines, registration N226UA, was climbing out of runway 28R bound for Osaka, Japan, when one of the six wheels on the left main gear truck detached and fell in a parking lot, damaging three cars. The aircraft landed safely at Los Angeles International Airport with no casualties. An airfield safety employee was injured while clearing debris.

== See also ==
- California World War II Army Airfields
- List of airports in California
- Transportation in the San Francisco Bay Area
