= Aviation biofuel demonstrations =

List of Aviation biofuel demonstration flights.

== Demonstration flights ==
Date	Operator	Platform	Biofuel	Notes
2 October 2007	GreenFlight International	Aero L-29 Delfín	Waste Vegetable Oil	Greenflight International made the very first flight of an aircraft powered entirely by 100% biofuel from the Reno, Stead airport on the afternoon of 2 October 2007. There is no citation for this entry – it was made by the pilot that flew it. In November 2008 the same aircraft and flight crew flew from Reno, NV to Leesburg, FL using 100% biofuel for the first seven of the nine legs, the remaining three were completed on a 50% biofuel 50% JetA blend.
February 2008	Virgin Atlantic	Boeing 747	Coconut and Babassu	Virgin flew a biofuel test flight between London and Amsterdam, using a 20% blend of biofuels in one of its engines Supported by Boeing, GE Aviation and Imperium Renewables; Greenpeace qualified it as greenwash, as organic oil production could lead to deforestation, increasing greenhouse gas emissions.
December 2008	Air New Zealand	Boeing 747-400	Jatropha	A two-hour test flight using a 50–50 mixture of the new biofuel with Jet A-1 in the number one position Rolls-Royce RB211 engine of 747-400 ZK-NBS, was successfully completed on 30 December 2008. The engine was then removed to be scrutinised and studied to identify any differences between the Jatropha blend and regular Jet A1. No effects to performance were found. The airline expects Jatropha to avoid competing with food crops and to be cost competitive with replaced jet fuels.
January 2009	Continental Airlines	Boeing 737-800	Algae and Jatropha	Continental Airlines ran the first flight of an algae-fueled jet. The flight from Houston's George Bush Intercontinental Airport completed a circuit over the Gulf of Mexico. The pilots on board executed a series of tests at 38,000 feet (12,000 m), including a mid-flight engine shutdown. Larry Kellner, chief executive of Continental Airlines, said they had tested a drop-in fuel which meant that no modification to the engine was required. The fuel was praised for having a low flash point and sufficiently low freezing point, issues that have been problematic for other bio-fuels. Over 1.5 hours, the engine operating on a blend of 44% Jatropha oil, 6% Algae oil and 50% traditional jet fuel burned 46 kg less fuel, while producing more thrust from the same volume of fuel.
January 2009	Japan Airlines	Boeing 747-300	Camelina, Jatropha and algae	Japan Airlines conducted a one and a half hour flight with one engine burning a 50/50 mix of Jet-A and biofuel from the Camelina plant.
November 2009	KLM	Boeing 747-400	Camelina	KLM conducted a flight with one engine burning 50/50 mix of Jet A-1 and Sustainable Aviation fuel based on the Camelina plane.
April 2010	United States Navy	F/A-18	Camelina	The Navy tested this biofuel blend on the F/A-18 Super Hornet aka "Green Hornet". Results from those tests indicated the aircraft performed as expected through its full flight envelope with no degradation of capability.
March 2010	United States Air Force	A-10	Camelina	On March 25, 2010, the United States Air Force conducted the first flight of an aircraft with all engines powered by a biofuel blend. The flight, performed on an A-10 at Eglin Air Force Base, used a 50/50 blend of JP-8 and Camelina-based fuel.
June 2010	Dutch Military	Ah-64 Apache Helicopter	Waste vegetable oil	
June 2010	EADS	Diamond D42	Algae	Occurred at an air show in Berlin in June 2010.
November 2010	United States Navy	Sikorsky SH-60 Seahawk	Camelina	Flown on 50/50 biofuel blend Nov. 18, 2010 in Patuxent River, Md. The helicopter, from Air Test and Evaluation Squadron 21 at Naval Air Station Patuxent River tested a fuel mixture made from the Camelina seed.
November 2010	TAM	Airbus A320	Jatropha	A 50/50 biofuel blend of conventional and jatropha oil
June 2011	Boeing	Boeing 747-8F	Camelina	Boeing flew its new model 747-8F to the Paris Air Show with all four engines burning a 15% mix of biofuel from camelina
June 2011	Honeywell	Gulfstream G450	Camelina	The first transatlantic biofuels flight using a 50/50 blend of camelina-based biofuel and petroleum-based fuel.
August 2011	United States Navy	McDonnell Douglas T-45 Goshawk	Camelina	Successfully flew a T-45 training aircraft using biofuels at the Naval Air Station (NAS) in Patuxent River, Maryland. The flight was completed by the “Salty Dogs” of Air Test and Evaluation Squadron 23 flying on biofuel mixture of 50/50 petroleum-based JP-5 jet fuel and plant-based camelina.
September 2011	United States Navy	McDonnell Douglas AV-8B Harrier II	Camelina	Naval Air Warfare Center Weapons Division, China Lake performed the first bio-fuel flight test in AV-8B Harrier from Air Test and Evaluation Squadron 31.
October 2011	Air China	Boeing 747-400	Jatropha	Air China flew China's first flight using aviation biofuels. The flight was conducted using Chinese grown jatropha oil from PetroChina. The flight was 2 hours in duration above Beijing, and used 50% biofuel in 1 engine.
November 2011	Continental Airlines	Boeing 737-800	Algae	United / Continental flew a biofuel flight from IAH to ORD on algae jet fuel supplied by Solazyme. The fuel was partially derived from genetically modified algae that feed on plant waste and produce oil. It was the first biofuel-powered air service in the US.
November 2011	Alaska Airlines	Boeing 737 and Bombardier Q400	Algae	Alaska Airlines and its sister carrier, Horizon Air, converted 75 flights on their schedules to run on a fuel mixture of 80% kerosene and 20% biofuel derived from used cooking oil. The biofuel was made by Dynamic Fuels, a joint venture of Tyson Foods and Syntroleum Corp.
January 2012	Etihad Airways	Boeing 777-300ER	Waste vegetable oil	Etihad Airways conducted a biofuel flight from Abu Dhabi to Seattle using a combination of traditional jet fuel and fuel based on recycled vegetable cooking oil
April 2012	Qantas	Airbus A330	Refined cooking oil	Qantas used 50/50 mix of biofuel supplied by SkyNRG and Jet-A fuel in one engine for a flight from Sydney to Adelaide.
April 2012	Porter Airlines	Bombardier Q400	Camelina and Brassica carinata	Porter Airlines used 50/50 mix of biofuel (49% Camelina sativa and 1% Brassica carinataand) and Jet-A fuel in one engine for a flight from Toronto to Ottawa.
October 2012	NRC	Dassault Falcon 20	Brassica carinata	First jet to fly on 100% biofuels that meet petroleum specifications without blending. Fuel was produced by Applied Research Associates (ARA) and Chevron Lummus Global (CLG) from carinata oil supplied by Agrisoma Biosciences.
March 2013	Paramus Flying Club	Cessna 182 Skylane	Waste vegetable oil	First piston engine aircraft to fly with a 50/50 blend of aviation biofuel and conventional Jet-A (as specified by ASTM D7566). First piston engine aircraft to fly with a biofuel blend operating under a standard (not experimental) airworthiness certificate. Demonstration flight from North Central State Airport (KSFZ) in Rhode Island to First Flight Airport (KFFA) in North Carolina took place on March 2, 2013. The Cessna 182 had been converted under STC to be powered by an SMA jet-fuel diesel cycle piston engine, and the blended biofuel was provided by SkyNRG of Holland.
December 22, 2014	United States Navy	F/A-18	ATJ-SPK (Alcohol-to-Jet Synthetic Paraffinic Kerosene)	The United States Navy tested a 50/50 blend of alcohol-to-jet biofuel provided by Gevo, Inc in supersonic (above Mach 1) afterburner operations. The demonstration proved Gevo, Inc's ATJ-SPK to be a viable alternative for both military and commercial applications.
Spring 2018	Boeing	Boeing 777F	Paraffinic biofuel	As part of Boeing's ecoDemonstrator program, this aircraft made the world's first commercial airliner flights using 100% biofuel.
July, 2018	Royal Netherlands Air Force	F-16 MLU	Waste vegetable oil	During a two-week period the Royal Netherlands Air Force tested a fuel blend with 5% biofuel provided by AltAir Fuels, California.
August 28, 2018	SpiceJet	Bombardier Q400	Agricultural residues, non-edible oils and bio-degradable fractions of industrial and municipal wastes	India's first biofuel-powered flight was successfully tested between Dehradun to Delhi carrying DGCA officials to ascertain the feasibility of biofuel powered flights.
January 16, 2019	Etihad Airways	Boeing 787	Salicornia	Etihad Airways flew the first Salicornia plant biofuel powered plane from Abu Dhabi to Amsterdam using 50–50 mix of Salicornia plant with traditional fuel.
November 16, 2022	Royal Air Force	Airbus A330 MRTT Voyager	Refined cooking oil	The RAF, in conjunction with Airbus, Rolls Royce and others, completed a replicated refuelling exercise from RAF Brize Norton, using 100% sustainable aviation fuel in both engines. It is claimed to be "the world’s first 100% SAF flight using an in-service military aircraft of its size".

== Commercial flights ==
Date	Operator	Platform	Biofuel	Notes
June 30, 2011	KLM	Boeing 737-800	Waste vegetable oil	KLM flew the world's first commercial biofuel flight, carrying 171 passengers from Amsterdam to Paris
July 15, 2011	Lufthansa	Airbus A321	Jatropha, Camelina and animal fats	First German commercial biofuel's flight, and the start of 6-month regular series of flights from Hamburg to Frankfurt with one of the two engines use biofuel. It officially ended on January 12, 2012, with a flight from Frankfurt to Washington and would not take biofuel further unless the biofuel was more widely produced.
July 20, 2011	Finnair	Airbus A319	Waste vegetable oil	The 1,500 km journey between Amsterdam and Helsinki was fuelled with a mix of 50 per cent biofuel derived from used cooking oil and 50 per cent conventional jet fuel. Finnair says it will conduct at least three weekly Amsterdam-to-Helsinki flights using the biofuel blend in both of the aircraft's engines. Refueling will be done at Amsterdam Airport Schiphol.
Jul 2011	Interjet	Airbus A320	Jatropha	Flight was powered by 27% jatropha between Mexico City and Tuxtla Gutierrez
Aug 2011	AeroMexico	Boeing 777-200	Jatropha	Aeromexico flew the world's first trans-Atlantic revenue flight, from Mexico City to Madrid with passengers
Oct 2011	Thomson Airways	Boeing 757-200	Waste vegetable oil	Thomson flew the UK's first commercial biofuel flight from Birmingham Airport on one engine using biofuel from used cooking oil, supplied by SkyNRG
Nov 2011	Continental Airlines	Boeing 737-800	Algae fuel	United / Continental flew biofuel flight from IAH to ORD on algae jet fuel, which supplied by Solazyme
April 19, 2012	Jetstar	Airbus A320	Refined cooking oil	JQ flight 705 departed Melbourne at 0950 and arrived in Hobart at 1105 supplied by SkyNRG
March 13, 2013	KLM	Boeing 777-206ER	Waste vegetable oil	KLM begins weekly flights by a Boeing 777-200 between John F. Kennedy Airport in New York City, USA and Amsterdam's Schiphol Airport, Netherlands using Biofuel supplied by SkyNRG
May 16, 2014	KLM	Airbus A330-200	Waste vegetable oil	KLM begins weekly flights by an Airbus A330-200 between Queen Beatrix International Airport, in Oranjestad Aruba and Amsterdam's Schiphol Airport, Netherlands (with a stop-over in Bonaire) using Biofuel supplied by SkyNRG
Aug 4, 2014	Gol Transportes Aéreos	Boeing 737-700	Inedible corn oil and Waste vegetable oil	Gol Flight 2152 took off from Rio Santos Dumont Airport (SDU) towards Brasilia (BSB) with a 4% mix of bio jetfuel
Nov 7, 2014	Scandinavian Airlines	Boeing 737-600	Waste vegetable oil	SAS Flight SK2064 flew their first ever flight using bio-fuel between Stockholm and Östersund using a 10% blend of JET A1 based on used cooking oil. It was also the first flight from Arlanda Airport
Nov 11, 2014	Scandinavian Airlines	Boeing 737-700	Waste vegetable oil	SAS Flight SK371 flew the first ever Norwegian domestic flight using bio-fuel between Trondheim and Oslo using a 48% blend of JET A1 based on used cooking oil
Mar 21, 2015	Hainan Airlines	Boeing 737-800	Waste vegetable oil	Hainan Airlines conducted China's first commercial biofuel flight carrying 156 passengers from Shanghai to Beijing. The fuel, supplied by Sinopec, was a fuel blend of approximately 50 percent aviation biofuel mixed with conventional petroleum jet fuel.
Mar 31, 2016	KLM	Embraer 190	Unknown	KLM operated an Embraer 190 on Biofuel between Oslo and Schiphol, Amsterdam. Embraer used these flights to measure the efficiency of the Embraer 190 on biofuel.
June 7, 2016	Alaska Airlines	Boeing 737-800	ATJ-SPK (Alcohol-to-Jet Synthetic Paraffinic Kerosene)	Alaska Airlines conducted the first commercial flights using alcohol-to-jet fuel made from U.S. sustainable corn. The alcohol-to-jet fuel was provided by Gevo, Inc and blended at approximately 20%. Alaska Airlines flew two flights from Seattle, Washington to San Francisco, California and from Seattle, Washington to Washington D.C.
Sept 8, 2016	KLM	Boeing 747-400	Waste vegetable oil	KLM signed a contract to operate all daily flights from LAX to Schiphol, Amsterdam. SkyNRG supplies the sustainable biofuel, which is made from used cooking oil by AltAir Fuels in Los Angeles. All flights from Los Angeles to Amsterdam are operated with biofuel until 2019.
Nov 14, 2016	Alaska Airlines	Boeing 737-800	ATJ-SPK (Alcohol-to-Jet Synthetic Paraffinic Kerosene)	Alaska Airlines conducted the first commercial flight using sustainable alternative fuel made from forest residuals. The fuel for the flight from Seattle, Washington to Washington D.C. was provided by a joint effort from Northwest Advanced Renewables Alliance (NARA) and Gevo, Inc. The flight emitted approximately 70% less CO2 than conventional jet fuel.
May 1, 2017	Singapore Airlines	Airbus A350-900	HEFA (hydro-processed esters and fatty acids)	Singapore Airlines begun a series of biofuel flights using A350-900 aircraft on non-stop trans-Pacific flights between Singapore and San Francisco. The project is being undertaken by Singapore Airlines in conjunction with the Civil Aviation Authority of Singapore and air navigation service providers, using enhanced flight operations and Air Traffic Management (ATM) practices along the flight route.
November 28, 2023	Virgin Atlantic	Boeing 787	HEFA (hydro-processed esters and fatty acids)	Flight 100: The world’s first transatlantic flight flown on 100% Sustainable Aviation Fuel (SAF) by a commercial airline.
