= SkyNRG =

Dutch SAF company

- Company type: Private
- Industry: Aviation, Sustainable fuels
- Founded: 2009
- Founders: Maarten van Dijk, Theye Veen
- Headquarters: Amsterdam, Netherlands
- Products: Sustainable aviation fuel (SAF)
- Website: skynrg.com

SkyNRG B.V. (/ˈskaɪ ɛn ɑr ˈdʒi/, SKY-en-ar-JEE) is a Dutch company headquartered in Amsterdam, Netherlands, that sources and supplies sustainable aviation fuel (SAF) for use on commercial flights.

The company supplies airlines with SAF primarily produced from used cooking oil, and in 2011 was the first company to supply SAF for a commercial flight.

SkyNRG is developing SAF production plants in the United States, Netherlands, and Sweden to produce SAF from feedstocks like waste and captured carbon dioxide.

== History ==
SkyNRG was founded in 2009 by current shareholders KLM and partners.

In 2011, SkyNRG supplied SAF to KLM for the first ever commercial flight using SAF. The Boeing 737-800 carried 171 passengers from Amsterdam to Paris using a 50/50 blend of conventional jet fuel and SAF from used cooking oil.

In 2019, SkyNRG began developing SAF production facilities. The first plant is being developed in Delfzijl, Netherlands.

Second and third plants were announced in Washington and Sweden, respectively.

== Operations ==
SkyNRG’s principal activities from its founding have been the sourcing and distribution of SAF generated from used cooking oils. To date, SkyNRG has supplied over 50 airlines and major corporations with SAF for use on commercial flights.

Since 2019, the company has expanded operations to include the production of SAF. Its plant in the Netherlands, named DSL-01, will produce SAF from used cooking oils.

The production plant planned for Walla Walla, Washington will produce SAF using waste and waste gases as its primary feedstock.

The plant in Sweden will use captured CO_{2} to produce SAF.

== Market Influence ==
SkyNRG contributes an annual report called the Sustainable Aviation Fuel Market Outlook.

In 2024, SkyNRG launched a Book & Claim initiative called Project Runway, allowing companies to purchase SAF for use on flights, regardless of their proximity to SAF sources.

SkyNRG has long-term purchase agreements worth over $4 billion.

== Shareholders ==
SkyNRG was initially founded by KLM, Spring Associates, EME, and management.

Current shareholders also include Macquarie Asset Management and APG.

== See also ==
- Aviation biofuel
- Jet fuel
- Environmental impact of aviation
- Aviation fuel
