= List of Breeze Airways destinations =

This is a list of destinations that Breeze Airways has operated to with scheduled flights as of September 2025. It does not include destinations operated as solely charter flights. Originally established in July 2018, the American low-cost airline launched operations in May 2021. It operates a fleet of Airbus A220 aircraft on domestic routes within the United States as well as on international routes. There are 89 routes over six countries. The airline is served by 12 operating bases.

== List ==
Country or territory	City	Airport	Start date	End date	Notes	Refs
The Bahamas	Nassau	Lynden Pindling International Airport	June 11, 2026	Present		
Costa Rica	San José	Juan Santamaría International Airport	October 3, 2026	Present		
Dominican Republic	Punta Cana	Punta Cana International Airport	March 4, 2026	Present		
Dominican Republic	Santo Domingo	Las Américas International Airport	June 18, 2027	—	Future	
Jamaica	Montego Bay	Sangster International Airport	December 19, 2026	—	Future	
Mexico	Cancún	Cancún International Airport	January 10, 2026	Present	Seasonal	
United States Virgin Islands	St. Thomas	Cyril E. King Airport	December 16, 2026	—	Future	
United States (Alabama)	Birmingham	Birmingham–Shuttlesworth International Airport	July 3, 2026	Present		
United States (Alabama)	Huntsville	Huntsville International Airport	July 15, 2021	Present		
United States (Alabama)	Mobile	Mobile International Airport	April 10, 2024	January 31, 2025	Terminated	
United States (Arizona)	Phoenix	Phoenix Sky Harbor International Airport	November 19, 2022	Present		
United States (Arkansas)	Fayetteville/Bentonville	Northwest Arkansas National Airport	June 17, 2021	Present		
United States (California)	Burbank	Hollywood Burbank Airport	February 5, 2026	Present		
United States (California)	Eureka/Arcata	Arcata–Eureka Airport	March 12, 2026	Present		
United States (California)	Los Angeles	Los Angeles International Airport	November 2, 2022	Present		
United States (California)	San Bernardino	San Bernardino International Airport	August 4, 2022	Present		
United States (California)	San Diego	San Diego International Airport	April 30, 2024	Present	Seasonal	
United States (California)	San Francisco	San Francisco International Airport	May 25, 2022	Present		
United States (California)	Santa Ana	John Wayne Airport	February 16, 2023	Present		
United States (Colorado)	Denver	Denver International Airport	May 16, 2024	Present	Seasonal	
United States (Colorado)	Grand Junction	Grand Junction Regional Airport	February 6, 2024	Present		
United States (Colorado)	Montrose	Montrose Regional Airport	December 21, 2024	Present	Seasonal	
United States (Connecticut)	Hartford	Bradley International Airport	May 27, 2021	Present	Base	
United States (Connecticut)	New Haven	Tweed New Haven Airport	December 10, 2024	Present		
United States (District of Columbia)	Washington, D.C.	Dulles International Airport	September 27, 2024	Present		
United States (Florida)	Daytona Beach	Daytona Beach International Airport	November 14, 2024	Present		
United States (Florida)	Fort Lauderdale	Fort Lauderdale–Hollywood International Airport	November 5, 2025	Present		
United States (Florida)	Fort Myers	Southwest Florida International Airport	June 11, 2022	Present	Base	
United States (Florida)	Jacksonville	Jacksonville International Airport	May 19, 2022	Present		
United States (Florida)	Key West	Key West International Airport	June 12, 2025	Present		
United States (Florida)	Orlando	Orlando International Airport	June 23, 2022	Present	Base	
United States (Florida)	Pensacola	Pensacola International Airport	June 28, 2024	Present		
United States (Florida)	Sarasota	Sarasota–Bradenton International Airport	June 4, 2022	Present		
United States (Florida)	Tallahassee	Tallahassee International Airport	July 2, 2026	Present		
United States (Florida)	Tampa	Tampa International Airport	May 27, 2021	Present	Base	
United States (Florida)	Vero Beach	Vero Beach Regional Airport	February 2, 2023	Present	Base	
United States (Florida)	West Palm Beach	Palm Beach International Airport	February 19, 2022	Present		
United States (Georgia)	Savannah	Savannah/Hilton Head International Airport	June 3, 2022	Present		
United States (Idaho)	Twin Falls	Magic Valley Regional Airport	March 6, 2026	Present		
United States (Illinois)	Springfield	Abraham Lincoln Capital Airport	December 1, 2023	Present		
United States (Indiana)	Evansville	Evansville Regional Airport	February 23, 2024	Present		
United States (Indiana)	South Bend	South Bend International Airport	November 7, 2024	Present		
United States (Kentucky)	Louisville	Louisville International Airport	May 28, 2021	Present		
United States (Louisiana)	New Orleans	Louis Armstrong New Orleans International Airport	July 8, 2021	Present	Base	
United States (Maine)	Bangor	Bangor International Airport	October 3, 2024	Present		
United States (Maine)	Portland	Portland International Jetport	May 17, 2023	Present		
United States (Maryland)	Baltimore	Baltimore/Washington International Airport	October 1, 2026	Present		
United States (Maryland)	Salisbury	Salisbury Regional Airport	October 1, 2025	Present		
United States (Massachusetts)	Boston	Logan International Airport	May 4, 2027	—	Future	
United States (Michigan)	Lansing	Capital Region International Airport	October 2, 2024	Present		
United States (Mississippi)	Gulfport/Biloxi	Gulfport–Biloxi International Airport	January 12, 2024	Present		
United States (Nebraska)	Lincoln	Lincoln Airport	December 10, 2025	Present		
United States (Nevada)	Las Vegas	Harry Reid International Airport	June 9, 2022	Present		
United States (New Hampshire)	Manchester	Manchester–Boston Regional Airport	June 14, 2024	Present		
United States (New Hampshire)	Portsmouth	Portsmouth International Airport at Pease	October 9, 2024	Present		
United States (New Jersey)	Atlantic City	Atlantic City International Airport	May 6, 2026	Present		
United States (New Jersey)	Newark	Newark Liberty International Airport	November 14, 2024	January 2, 2027		
United States (New Jersey)	Trenton	Trenton–Mercer Airport	September 20, 2026	Present		
United States (New York)	Albany	Albany International Airport	June 5, 2025	Present		
United States (New York)	Buffalo	Buffalo Niagara International Airport	June 29, 2027	—	Future	
United States (New York)	Islip	Long Island MacArthur Airport	February 17, 2022	Present		
United States (New York)	Newburgh	Stewart International Airport	February 14, 2024	Present		
United States (New York)	Ogdensburg	Ogdensburg International Airport	September 27, 2024	Present		
United States (New York)	Plattsburgh	Plattsburgh International Airport	November 28, 2023	April 28, 2025	Terminated	
United States (New York)	Rochester	Greater Rochester International Airport	May 8, 2025	Present		
United States (New York)	Syracuse	Syracuse Hancock International Airport	June 10, 2022	Present		
United States (New York)	White Plains	Westchester County Airport	June 28, 2022	Present		
United States (North Carolina)	Greensboro	Piedmont Triad International Airport	June 6, 2025	Present		
United States (North Carolina)	New Bern	Coastal Carolina Regional Airport	May 24, 2024	Present		
United States (North Carolina)	Raleigh/Durham	Raleigh–Durham International Airport	February 16, 2023	Present	Base	
United States (North Carolina)	Wilmington	Wilmington International Airport	February 13, 2025	Present		
United States (Ohio)	Akron/Canton	Akron–Canton Airport	June 26, 2021	Present	Base	
United States (Ohio)	Cincinnati/Covington	Cincinnati/Northern Kentucky International Airport	February 8, 2023	Present		
United States (Ohio)	Columbus	John Glenn Columbus International Airport	July 3, 2021	Present		
United States (Ohio)	Dayton	Dayton International Airport	October 9, 2026	Present		
United States (Oklahoma)	Oklahoma City	Will Rogers International Airport	July 1, 2021	August 10, 2022	Terminated	
United States (Oklahoma)	Tulsa	Tulsa International Airport	June 4, 2021	November 27, 2023	Terminated	
United States (Oregon)	Redmond/Bend	Roberts Field	March 13, 2026	Present		
United States (Pennsylvania)	Erie	Erie International Airport	November 6, 2024	Present		
United States (Pennsylvania)	Lancaster	Lancaster Airport	October 8, 2024	Present		
United States (Pennsylvania)	Latrobe/Pittsburgh	Arnold Palmer Regional Airport	February 9, 2027	—	Future	
United States (Pennsylvania)	Pittsburgh	Pittsburgh International Airport	July 8, 2021	Present		
United States (Pennsylvania)	Wilkes-Barre/Scranton	Wilkes-Barre/Scranton International Airport	January 30, 2024	Present		
United States (Rhode Island)	Providence	Rhode Island T. F. Green International Airport	July 22, 2021	Present	Base	
United States (South Carolina)	Charleston	Charleston International Airport	May 27, 2021	Present	Base	
United States (South Carolina)	Greenville/Spartanburg	Greenville–Spartanburg International Airport	May 3, 2024	Present		
United States (South Carolina)	Myrtle Beach	Myrtle Beach International Airport	February 15, 2024	Present		
United States (Tennessee)	Bristol	Tri-Cities Regional Airport	December 12, 2025	Present		
United States (Tennessee)	Memphis	Memphis International Airport	May 7, 2025	Present		
United States (Tennessee)	Nashville	Nashville International Airport	May 26, 2022	May 22, 2023	Terminated	
United States (Texas)	Brownsville/South Padre Island	Brownsville/South Padre Island International Airport	May 15, 2026	Present		
United States (Texas)	Dallas/Fort Worth	Dallas Fort Worth International Airport	June 7, 2024	Present		
United States (Texas)	San Antonio	San Antonio International Airport	July 15, 2021; May 7, 2026	May 30, 2022; Present		
United States (Utah)	Ogden	Ogden–Hinckley Airport	February 21, 2024	Present		
United States (Utah)	Provo	Provo Municipal Airport	August 4, 2022	Present	Base	
United States (Vermont)	Burlington	Patrick Leahy Burlington International Airport	January 31, 2024	Present		
United States (Virginia)	Norfolk	Norfolk International Airport	June 10, 2021	Present	Base	
United States (Virginia)	Richmond	Richmond International Airport	July 8, 2021	Present		
United States (West Virginia)	Charleston	Yeager Airport	May 31, 2023	Present		
United States (Wisconsin)	Madison	Dane County Regional Airport	February 7, 2024	Present		
