= Imperial Airlines Flight 201/8 =

1961 aviation accident

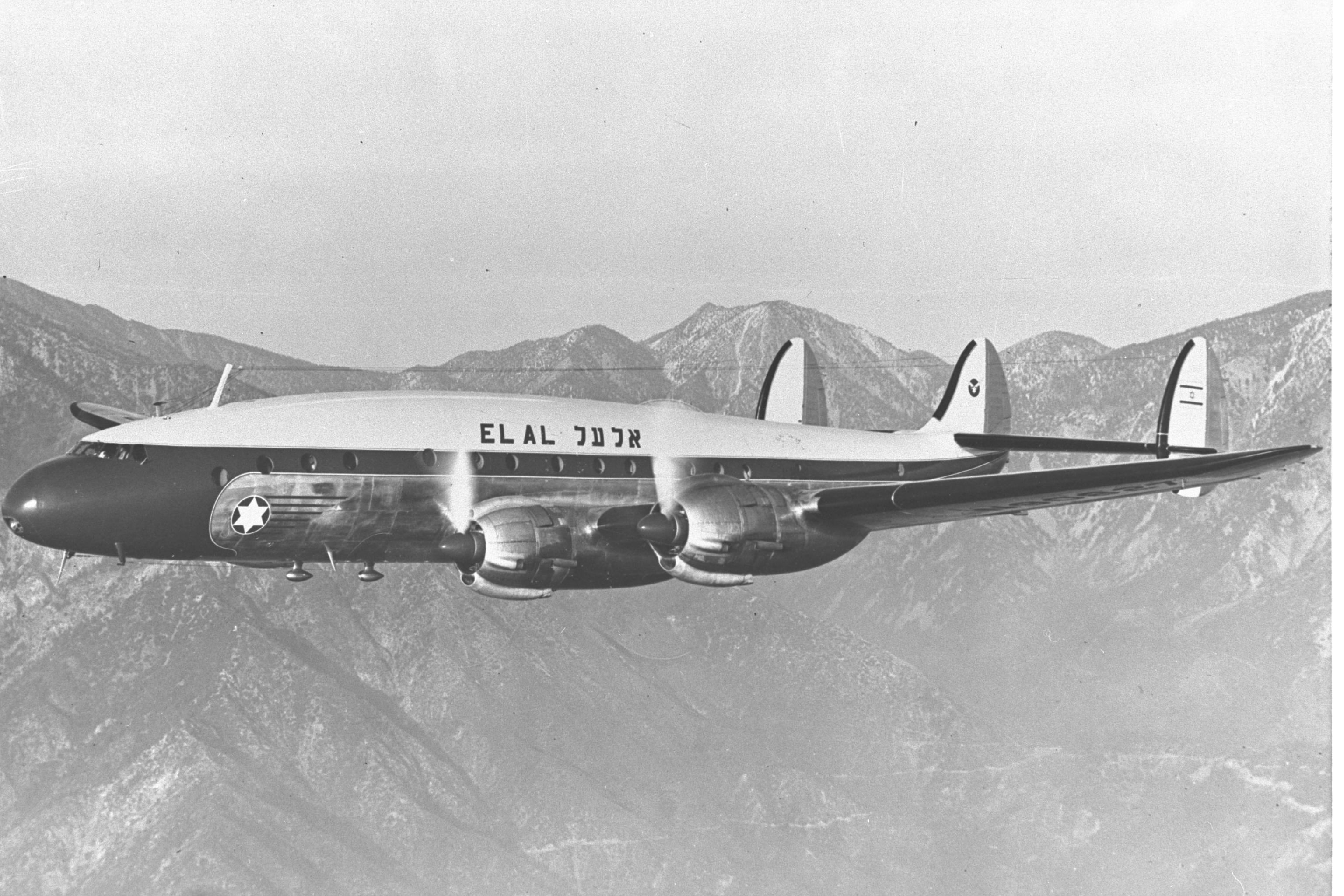
- Lockheed Constellation L-049 similar to accident aircraft

Accident
- Date: November 8, 1961
- Summary: Pilot error
- Site: Henrico County, near Byrd Field, Richmond, Virginia, US; 37°28′39.56″N 77°18′1.96″W

Aircraft
- Aircraft type: Lockheed L-049E Constellation
- Operator: Imperial Airlines
- Registration: N2737A
- Occupants: 79
- Passengers: 74
- Crew: 5
- Fatalities: 77
- Injuries: 2
- Survivors: 2

Imperial Airlines Flight 201/8 was a charter flight by the United States Army to transport new recruits to Columbia, South Carolina, for training. On November 8, 1961, the aircraft crashed as it attempted to land at Byrd Field, near Richmond, Virginia. This was at the time the second deadliest accident in American history for a single civilian aircraft.

The accident was investigated by the Civil Aeronautics Board (CAB), which attributed the cause to numerous errors committed by the flight crew, as well as poor management and improper maintenance by the airline. The CAB concluded that the "flight crew was not capable of performing the function or assuming the responsibility for the job they presumed to do."

== Aircraft ==
Flight 201/8 was operated by Imperial Airlines using a Lockheed Constellation L-049 four-engine propliner (registration N2737A (c/n 1976). The aircraft was manufactured in April 1946, and first acquired by Imperial in May 1961. The aircraft had logged 32,589 hours of operating time immediately prior to the accident flight.

== Flight crew ==
The Lockheed Constellation L-049, like many airliners of its era, was normally crewed by three individuals: a captain (or pilot in command) in the left seat, a first officer (also known as copilot) in the right seat, and a flight engineer in the rear seat. The accident flight crewing was unusual in several respects.

The pilot-in-command on Flight 201/8 was Ronald H. Conway, a captain first hired by Imperial Airlines in March 1960. Conway had 4,433 hours of flying time prior to the accident, including 293 hours on the L-049. Conway's first officer was James A. Greenlee, a qualified captain with more airline seniority and flight experience (17,841 hours, including 352 hours on the L-049) than Conway. Although Greenlee was the more senior captain, it was agreed between them prior to the flight that Conway would act as captain, and Greenlee would act as copilot. According to his post-accident testimony, Conway occupied the left (captain's) seat for the duration of Flight 201/8.

The aircraft's flight engineer was William F. Poythress, who was first issued a flight engineer's certificate on the L-049 in September 1961. He had accumulated approximately 200 hours of flying time in the L-049 prior to the accident. However, Conway testified after the accident that student flight engineer Peter E. Clark actually served as flight engineer and occupied the flight engineer's seat for the duration of the flight. Poythress, as the only other surviving crew member, denied Conway's claim. While both crew members agreed that Clark occupied the flight engineer's seat for the initial segments of the flight, Poythress testified that he, not Clark, occupied the flight engineer's seat during their takeoff from Baltimore, Maryland, a scheduled intermediate stop.

As would emerge in later testimony at the post-crash hearing, this crewing combination led to confusion in the cockpit during the final flight segment, as to who was making the decisions and giving the orders as pilot in command, and who was operating the engine and fuel controls as flight engineer.

== Flight history ==
The four-engined chartered propliner departed Columbia, South Carolina, at 15:14 Eastern Standard Time (EST) (Note: All times in this article are based on the times given in the CAB's final aircraft accident report, which are in Eastern Standard Time based on the 24-hour clock.), en route to Newark, New Jersey as its first stop. Upon departing Columbia, the No. 3 engine experienced a drop in fuel pressure. Poythress was at this time monitoring Clark, who as trainee was occupying the flight engineer's seat. Poythress asked Clark what he was going to do, and Clark said that he would open the crossfeed valves between the No. 3 and No. 4 engines to ensure positive fuel pressure on the right side of the aircraft. Poythress did not inform the captain of the drop in fuel pressure or the opening of crossfeed valves, and the crossfeed valves were closed once the Lockheed reached its cruising altitude of 9,500 feet.

The flight landed in Newark at 17:37, where it picked up its first group of 26 passengers. It departed Newark at 18:22 for Wilkes Barre, Pennsylvania, where it picked up 31 additional passengers. At 19:12 it departed for Baltimore, where it picked up a final group of 17 passengers, departing for Columbia, South Carolina at 20:30. According to his later testimony, during takeoff from each location, Poythress opened the cross feed valves between the No. 3 and No. 4 engines, to prevent the drop in fuel pressure seen while departing Columbia.

During the final flight segment from Baltimore to Columbia, the fuel pressure warning lights for the No. 3 and 4 engines came on, and the plane began to yaw to the right. Poythress, who had testified he was in the flight engineer's chair during takeoff, had given the flight engineer's seat to Clark by this time. Clark yelled to Poythress about the fuel pressure warning lights, and Poythress assumed the flight engineer's seat. The No. 3 engine stopped rotating, and the No. 4 engine was surging between 1,500 and 2,000 RPM. Conway told Poythress, "You've got a fuel problem," and Poythress opened all crossfeed valves and turned on all fuel boost pumps, trying to restore fuel flow to the engines. Poythress shut down engine No. 4 and tried to restart No. 3.

Poythress sent Clark to the passenger cabin to open the midship fuel crossfeed valve. Clark returned to the cockpit, stating that he needed a screwdriver to open the valve. According to Poythress, Greenlee then interrupted Poythress and Clark's efforts, telling them not to disturb the midship valve because he wanted to preserve positive fuel pressure on the still-operating engine Nos. 1 and 2. Conway denied knowledge of this conversation after the accident, and believed the midship valve had been opened. Efforts by Poythress to restart the No. 3 engine were unsuccessful, and Poythress told Conway that he did not believe he could restart either right-side engine, and that he recommended landing the airplane.

Flying with asymmetric thrust from the two left side engines (which continued to operate normally), Conway decided to land at Byrd Field (now called Richmond International Airport), near Richmond, Virginia, as a precaution. The crew did not expect a crash landing, and did not advise the flight attendants to give emergency evacuation instructions.

== Crash ==
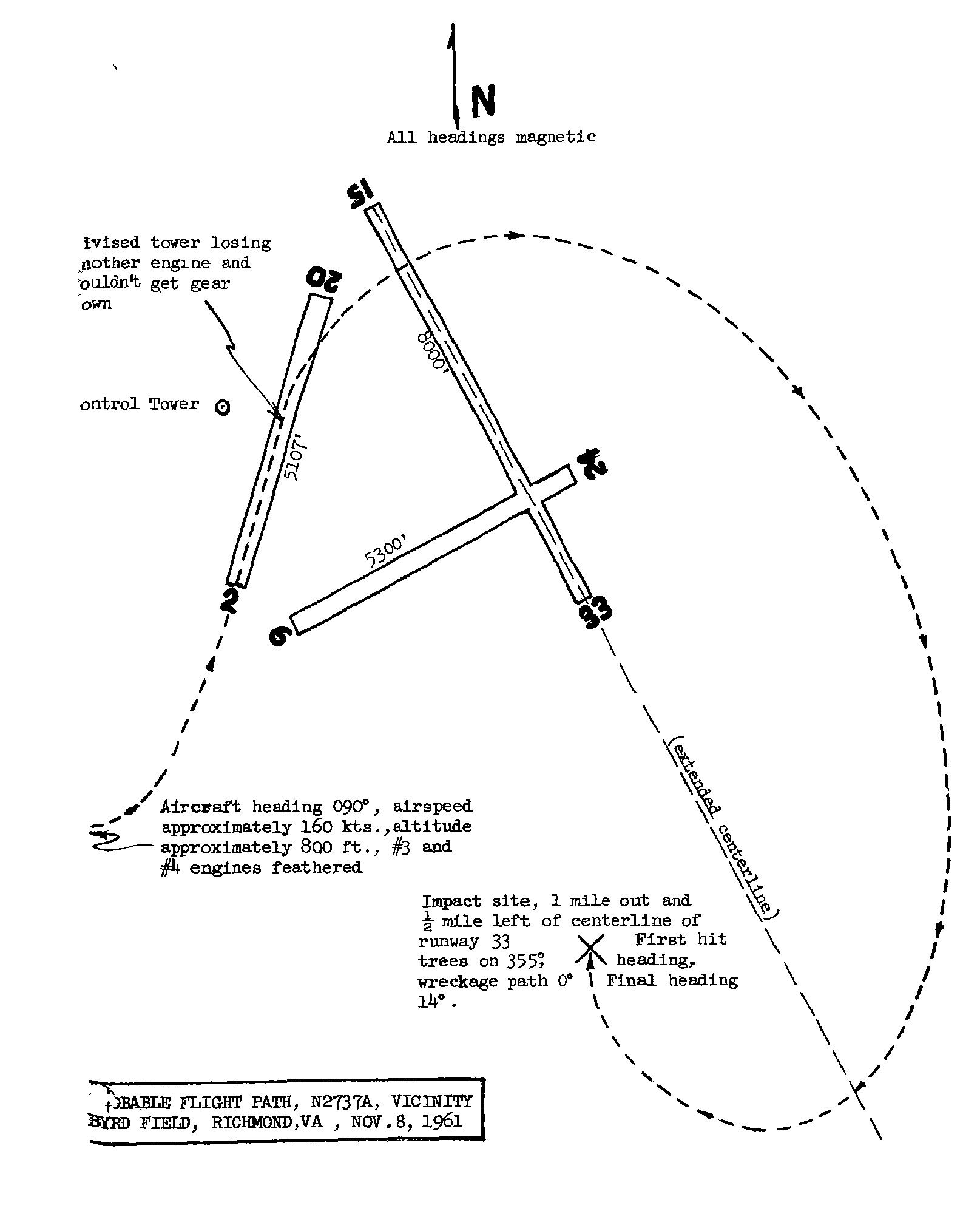
Flight 201/8's "probable flight path" into its crash point, from CAB report

At 21:10, Flight 201/8 contacted the Richmond controller, and was advised all runways were available. Greenlee (who was handling radio communications at the time) requested the airport have emergency vehicles on standby as a precaution. Conway then asked Greenlee to fly the aircraft, so that Conway could go back to check on the flight engineer's station.

With Greenlee flying, Conway advised the Richmond controller that they would circle and land on Runway 33, and that the aircraft had a "healthy airspeed." According to Conway, Greenlee then suddenly remarked, "let's use this runway," turned the aircraft toward Runway 2, and lowered the landing gear handle. Seeing the runway, Conway believed they were too high and too fast for Runway 2. In addition, the plane's landing gear stayed up despite Greenlee lowering the handle; in the L-049, hydraulic power to the landing gear could supplied by either of the plane's two right-side engines, Nos. 3 or 4, which were both shut down. Conway looked down at the landing gear lights, which were not illuminated, and yelled, "Landing gear is not down."

The crew's initial attempts to troubleshoot the landing gear failed, and the pilots realized the landing would need to be abandoned. Conway and Greenlee both called for full power on engines Nos. 1 and 2 in order to abort the landing and go around to Runway 33. Conway later testified that he believed the aircraft still had sufficient speed and altitude to go around and make Runway 33, but they would need to make a right turn to line up for the runway.

The Richmond controller heard one of Flight 201/8's pilots say, "Tower, get everybody off [the runway]. We're losing another one here and we can't get our gear down." Conway took over the controls for the start of the right turn, but lost sight of the airport, and turned control over to Greenlee, who could see the runway out of the right side of the aircraft. A continuous right turn brought the airplane around until Conway could see Runway 33 again. Poythress called out that they were losing power on engine No. 1.

Applying full emergency power to the two remaining engines resulted in an over-boost in the No. 1 engine (outboard on the left side), which caused a complete internal failure and destroyed the engine. With loss of the No. 1 engine, Flight 201/8 was left with only one functioning engine, leading to a rapid loss of airspeed and inevitable stall.

At 21:24, the aircraft crashed into trees, and a fire broke out which engulfed the entire aircraft in flames and smoke. Poythress opened the cockpit's door to the cabin, and the cockpit immediately filled with smoke. Poythress opened a crew exit door on the right side of the cockpit, while Conway opened a sliding window and used it to exit the aircraft. Conway later testified that the aircraft was completely engulfed in flames as soon as Conway got clear of it. Conway did not believe anyone else could have gotten clear of the plane.

All 74 passengers and three crew members died. Two crew members (Conway and Poythress) were the only survivors.

The grouping of passengers' bodies indicated that many survived the initial impact, and left their seats in an attempt to evacuate. The largest group of bodies was found near the main cabin entrance door, which was jammed shut by the ground impact or trees and debris. There were no apparent impact-related injuries, and all fatalities were attributed to suffocation due to carbon monoxide poisoning caused by the fire and smoke.

== Investigation ==
The accident was investigated by the CAB and included two hearings where, among others, the surviving captain and flight engineer testified. Based on their investigation, the CAB concluded that the momentary fuel pressure fluctuations in the number 3 and 4 (right side) engines noticed by the flight engineer during takeoff, were most likely caused by a boost pump failure, and did not necessitate any action as long as the engines kept running normally. According to the CAB, by opening the cross-feed valves between the number 3 and 4 fuel tanks, and leaving them open with the boost pump on for much of the flight, the flight engineer most likely caused the number 4 tank to run dry, resulting in the failure of both right side engines due to fuel exhaustion or starvation during the final flight segment.

The CAB concluded that, had proper fuel management procedures been followed, all engines would have kept running normally, or even restarted once they shut down. The Constellation crew, however, mismanaged the fuel flow to the right side engines, causing them to shut down, and were unable to restart them. During the ensuing precautionary landing which resulted in the crash, additional flight crew mistakes were highlighted by the CAB investigators, who were highly critical of Imperial Airlines management, maintenance and flying procedures. The CAB's final report stated:

From a study of all the information available to the Board it is concluded that this flight crew was not capable of performing the function or assuming the responsibility for the job they presumed to do. The Board further concludes that the management personnel of Imperial Airlines should have been aware of the manner in which company operations were being accomplished. It is believed that the substandard maintenance practices of Imperial's employees were condoned by management. The manner in which maintenance and personnel records were kept by the company confirms this conclusion.

The CAB issued the following Probable Cause statement:

The Board determines the probable cause of this accident was the lack of command coordination and decision, lack of judgment, and lack of knowledge of the equipment resulting in loss of power in three engines creating an emergency situation which the crew could not handle.

== Aftermath ==
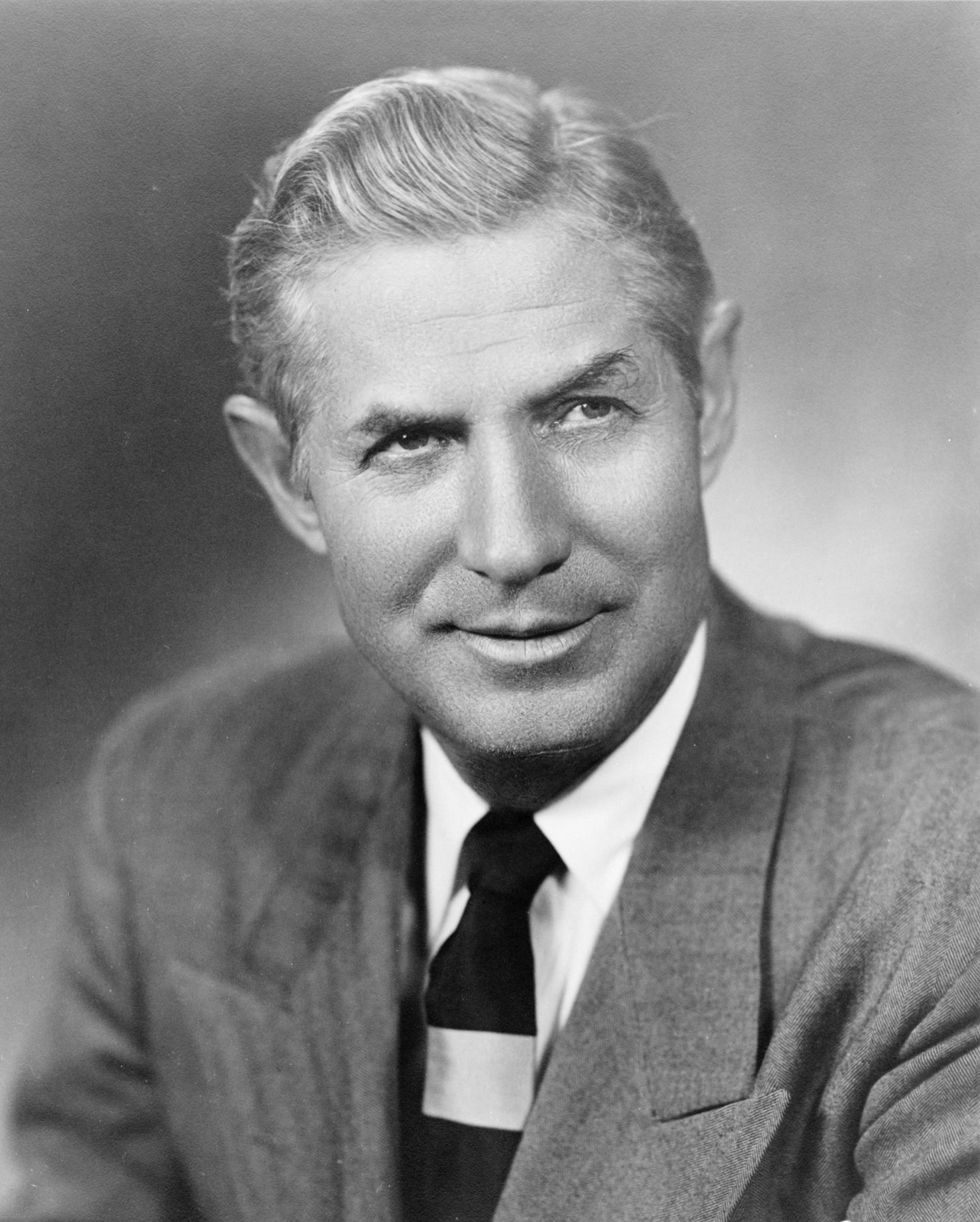
Senate Aviation Subcommittee Chairman A. S. Mike Monroney urged the Civil Aeronautics Board for a sweeping probe of the supplemental carrier industry as a result of the Imperial Airlines crash.

After the accident, it was revealed that Imperial Airlines had been fined in 1959 for "flying 30 marines in an 'unairworthy' C-46," and in 1953, under its previous name of "Regina Cargo Airlines", 19 soldiers had been killed in a crash near Centralia, Washington, while being transported in a Douglas DC-3 owned by the company.

Time news magazine reported that statistically the "nonskeds" in general were "more than 30 times as dangerous" in the number of fatalities per passenger mile as the scheduled airlines in 1961. According to Time, the U.S. military had been effectively forced to rely on nonskeds such as Imperial Airlines to carry troops within the U.S. because of the combination of two laws. First, the Congress had mandated the use of civilian air carriers (for economic reasons); and second, the Pentagon was obligated to bid for such services and select the lowest bidder, which often turned out to be financially unsound companies with a poor safety record.

As a result of the accident, the Congress became concerned about the safety practices of the nonskeds, or "supplemental carriers." The chairman of the Senate Aviation Subcommittee, A. S. Mike Monroney immediately sent a telegram to the CAB, urging a sweeping probe of the supplemental carrier industry. By 1962, Congress passed a law requiring all supplemental carriers to re-apply for certification by the CAB, to carry liability insurance and to maintain "a healthier financial status." The new rules caused some 20 nonskeds to go out of business, but within five years the industry was booming again, partly due to the troop and equipment carrying needs of the Vietnam War.

== See also ==
- Air Tahoma Flight 185 – another propliner accident caused by fuel cross-feed mismanagement
- List of accidents and incidents involving commercial aircraft
- List of defunct airlines of the United States
