= Richmond International Airport =

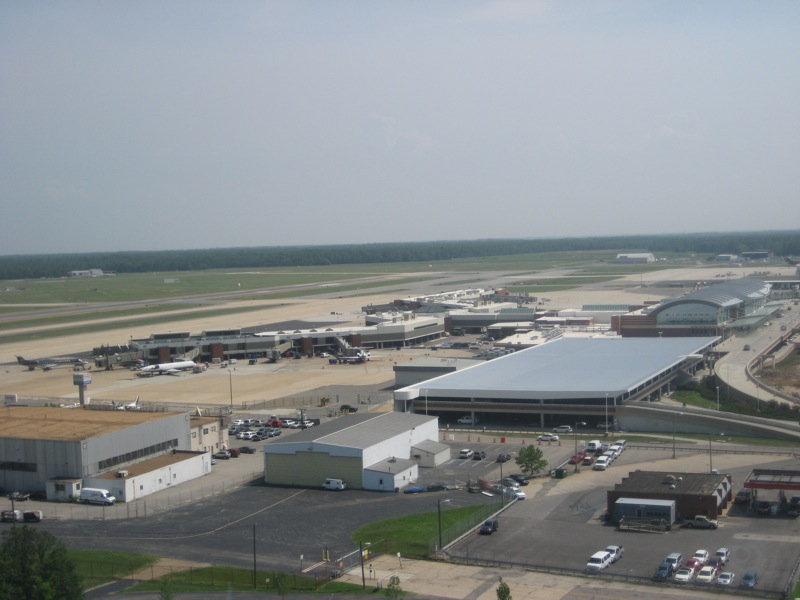
- IATA: RIC; ICAO: KRIC; FAA LID: RIC

Summary
- Airport type: Public
- Owner/Operator: Capital Region Airport Commission
- Serves: Central Virginia
- Location: Sandston, Virginia, U.S.
- Elevation AMSL: 167 ft (51 m)
- Coordinates: 37°30′18″N 077°19′10″W
- Website: flyrichmond.com

Maps
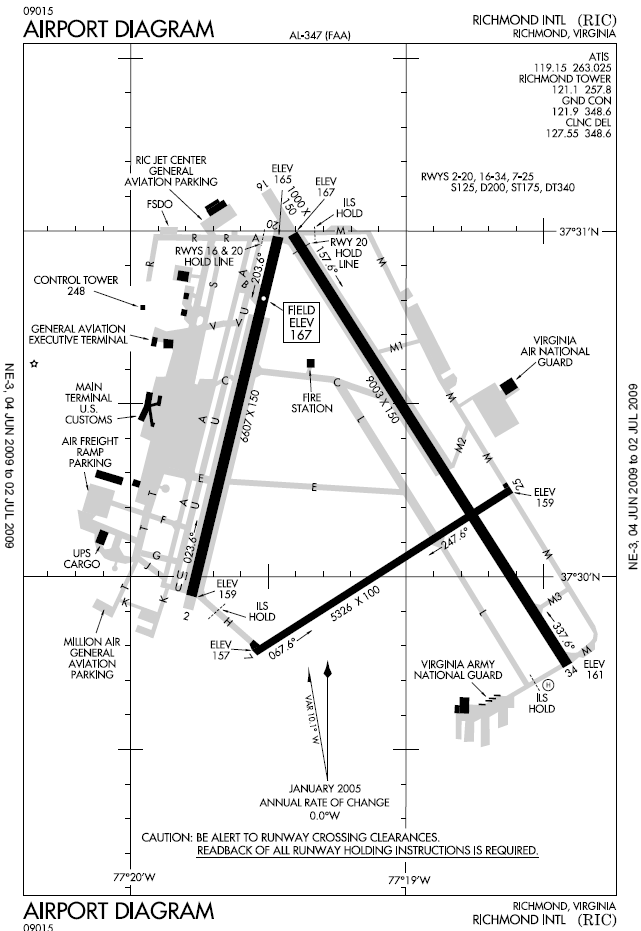
- FAA airport diagram (2009)
- Interactive map of Richmond International Airport

Runways
Direction	Length		Surface
Direction	ft	m	Surface
16/34	9,003	2,744	Asphalt
02/20	6,607	2,014	Asphalt

Statistics (2025)
- Aircraft operations: 108,527
- Total Passengers: 4,922,994 ▲0.80%
- Total cargo (cargo+mail) (lbs.): 222,987,078
- Sources: Federal Aviation Administration and RIC Airport

Richmond International Airport (IATA: RIC, ICAO: KRIC, FAA LID: RIC) is a joint civil-military airport in Sandston, Virginia, United States, an unincorporated community (in Henrico County). The airport is about 7 miles (11 km) southeast of downtown Richmond, the capital of the Commonwealth of Virginia. Richmond International Airport is the busiest airport in central Virginia and the third-busiest in the state behind Washington Reagan and Washington Dulles. RIC covers 2,500 acres (1,012 ha) of land.

== Overview ==
The Capital Region Airport Commission (CRAC) owns and operates Richmond International Airport. Established in 1975 by the Virginia General Assembly, the commission is overseen by representatives of the counties of Chesterfield, Hanover, and Henrico, and the City of Richmond. RIC serves the Greater Richmond Region with non-stop flights to 26 destinations, served by seven air carriers. A joint civil-military public airport, RIC encompasses the former property of the Richmond International Airport Air National Guard Station, which was transferred to the Department of the Army in support of U.S. Army Reserves and Virginia Army National Guard Activities.

In the early 2000s, Richmond saw another period of extensive growth, and in 2005 it announced a complete redesign. RIC went from a single story terminal with 12 gates to 22 gates (plus numerous non-jet bridge gates), added parking spaces (to 10,500), and created a new terminal roadway and air traffic control tower. The project features major renovations of the terminal building, including upper-level departures and lower-level arrivals, the construction of a central utility plant, and the widening of security checkpoints. Construction on the two-level terminal was completed in spring 2007, and was designed by Gresham, Smith & Partners. Due to passenger growth, Richmond reopened its international gate (B15) for flights to Cancun, Toronto and Punta Cana, all of which are seasonal services.

In 2016, Richmond recorded its second highest yearly passenger volume, and the airport had a major expansion begun in late 2018. The number of gates increased from 22 to 28 or 30 by adding 6 or 8 gates (net) to its A Concourse. Construction commenced in late 2018 and lasted for 3 years. The expansion was completed in 2021.

The airport also expanded the checkpoint area in Concourse B, from four to six TSA screening lanes. The TSA lane expansion commenced in the fall of 2018 and was completed in June 2019. Concourse A has three screening lanes in its checkpoint area, though that is likely to be expanded in the next few years. More construction at the airport is coming - the Capital Region Airport Commission is looking into moving the rental car counters from the central portion of the lower lobby level to an expanded north baggage claim area. The airport also expects to add an enclosed two-level connecting walkway between the terminal and the rental car garage. The rental car garage is also set to expand. In November 2024, the Commission announced an official plan to consolidate the TSA security checkpoints into one central location, made possible by a $2.5 million FAA grant. The number of lanes is not finalized yet, but the construction and updates is expected to begin in late 2026.

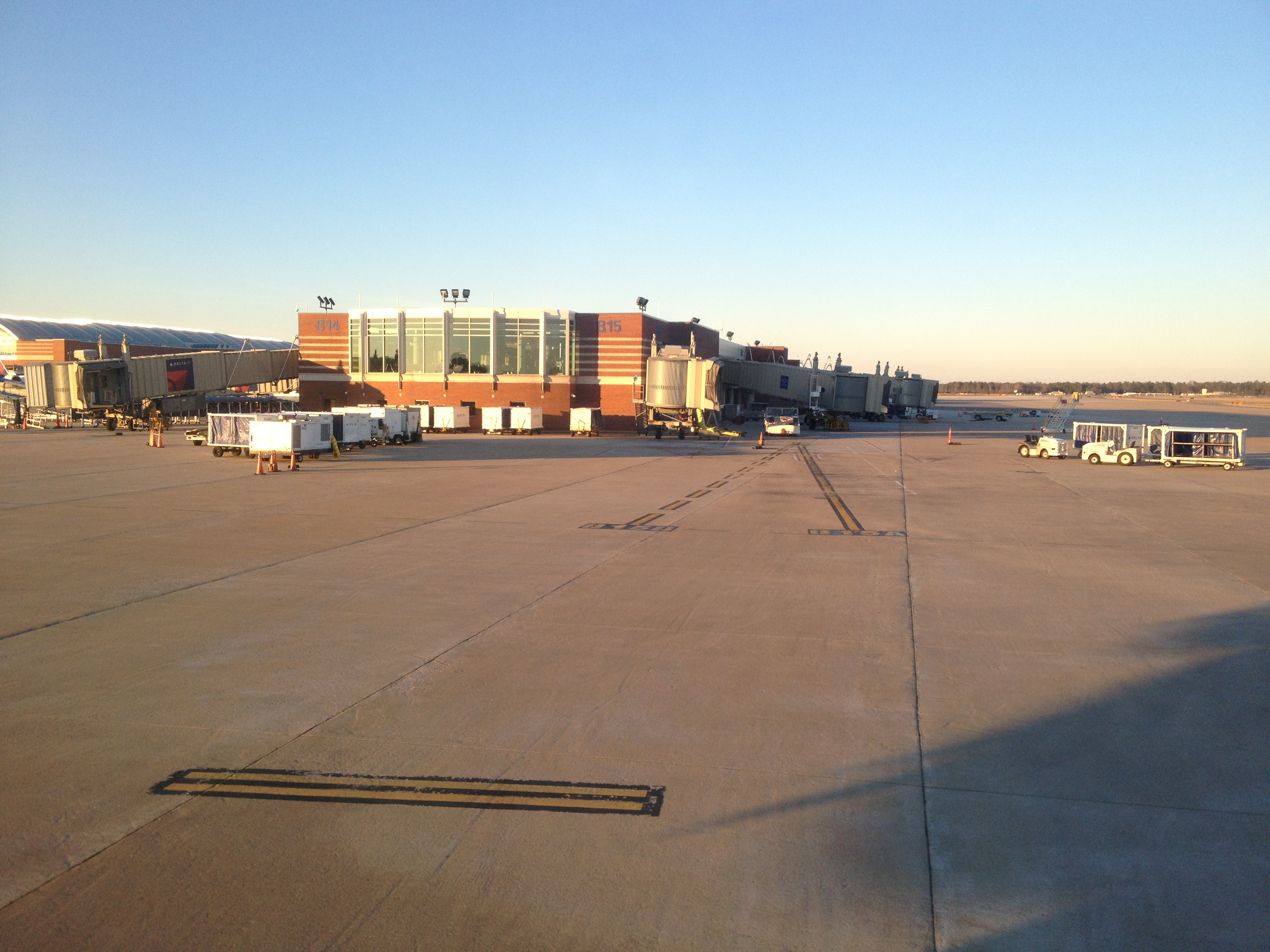
An exterior view of Richmond International Airport from Concourse B

In 2016, Richmond International Airport handled over 63,000 tons of cargo, an all-time high. Cargo services include more than 100,000 square feet (10,000 m^{2}) of warehouse/office space and 1,000,000 square feet (100,000 m^{2}) of apron space. The airport is designated a Foreign Trade Zone. Because of its position on the Eastern Seaboard, cargo transit via RIC is on the rise. Goods shipped out of the metropolitan Richmond area can reach 72% of the U.S. population within 24 hours.

In 2016, RIC reported its 32nd consecutive month of growth, with an estimated 345,000 travelers reported in October 2016. Several airlines serving RIC have responded to growing demand with upgraded routes and aircraft. Delta Air Lines, JetBlue Airways and Southwest Airlines added additional routes and larger aircraft in 2017. United Airlines up-gauged its Denver service to a mainline aircraft, replacing the Embraer E-175 used with United Express.

In 2017, the airport served 3,657,479 passengers, a record for the airport at that time, breaking its previous record of 3,634,544 in 2007. In 2023, RIC set an all-time passenger record of 4,755,889. RIC is served by airlines flying primarily domestic routes to cities in the South, Northeast and Midwest, and connecting flights to major hubs for international destinations.

The airport will plan to open scheduled flights to Europe.

== History ==
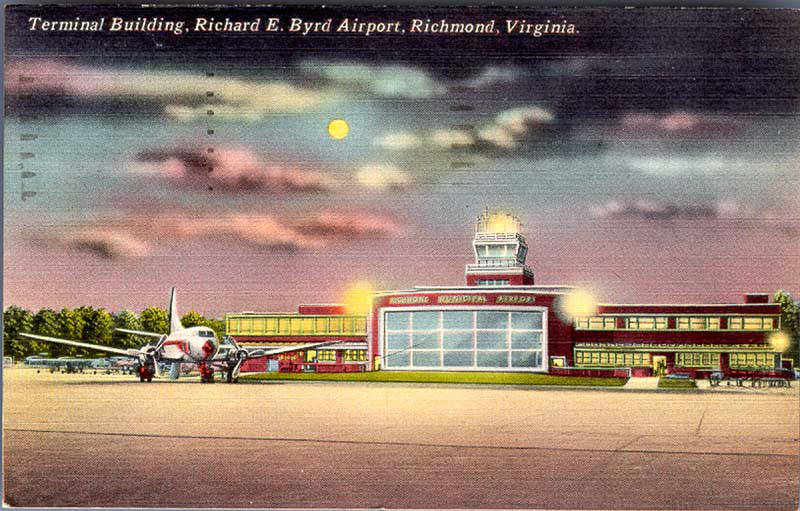
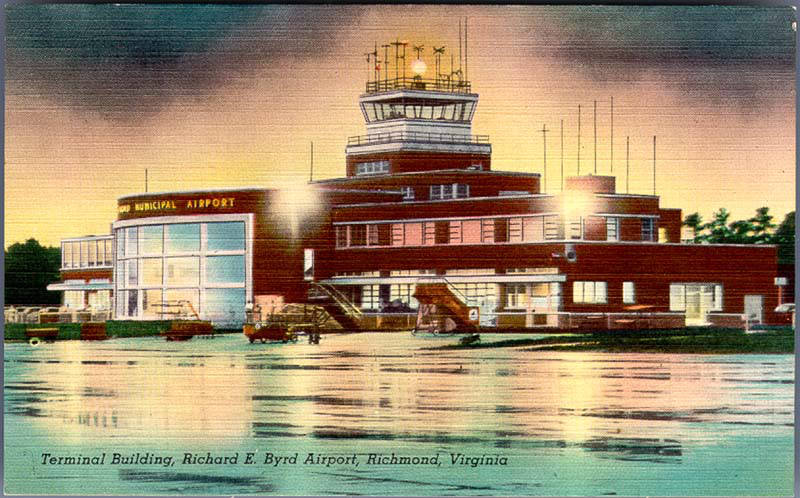
Drawings of Richard E. Byrd airport, as it appeared in 1950.

The airport was dedicated as Richard Evelyn Byrd Flying Field in 1927 in honor of aviator Richard E. Byrd, brother of then Gov. Harry F. Byrd. Charles Lindbergh attended the dedication ceremony. Although the facility was in Henrico County, Richmond Mayor John Fulmer Bright was instrumental in the creation of Byrd Field, which was initially owned by the City of Richmond. It was renamed Richard E. Byrd Airport in 1950, and became Richmond International Airport in 1984. The airport's manager from 1957 to 1988 was Anthony E. Dowd, Sr.

A terminal building designed by Marcellus Wright and Son was completed in 1950. It was expanded from 1968 to 1970, which included the current passenger concourses.

The April 1957 Official Airline Guide lists 43 weekday departures: 22 on Eastern Air Lines, ten on Piedmont Airlines, five on American Airlines, four on National Airlines and two on Capital Airlines.

In the mid-1970s United Airlines scheduled a daily round trip between Richmond and Los Angeles (LAX) with a Douglas DC-8-61 via Washington–Dulles. The DC-8-61 was most likely the largest passenger airliner ever scheduled to the airport. United was also flying Boeing 727-200s and Boeing 737-200s to the airport, including nonstop flights to Washington–National in addition to Dulles. Other airlines at Richmond in 1975 included Eastern Air Lines operating Boeing 727s and McDonnell Douglas DC-9-30s with nonstops from Atlanta, New York–JFK, New York–LaGuardia and Raleigh/Durham; and Piedmont Airlines operating Boeing 737-200s and NAMC YS-11s nonstop from Charleston (WV), Chicago–O'Hare, Huntington, Lynchburg (VA), Newport News, Norfolk, Raleigh/Durham, Roanoke, Rocky Mount/Wilson, and Washington–National. Altair Airlines, a commuter air carrier, was serving Richmond with Beechcraft 99s nonstop from Baltimore, Philadelphia and Wilmington, DE.

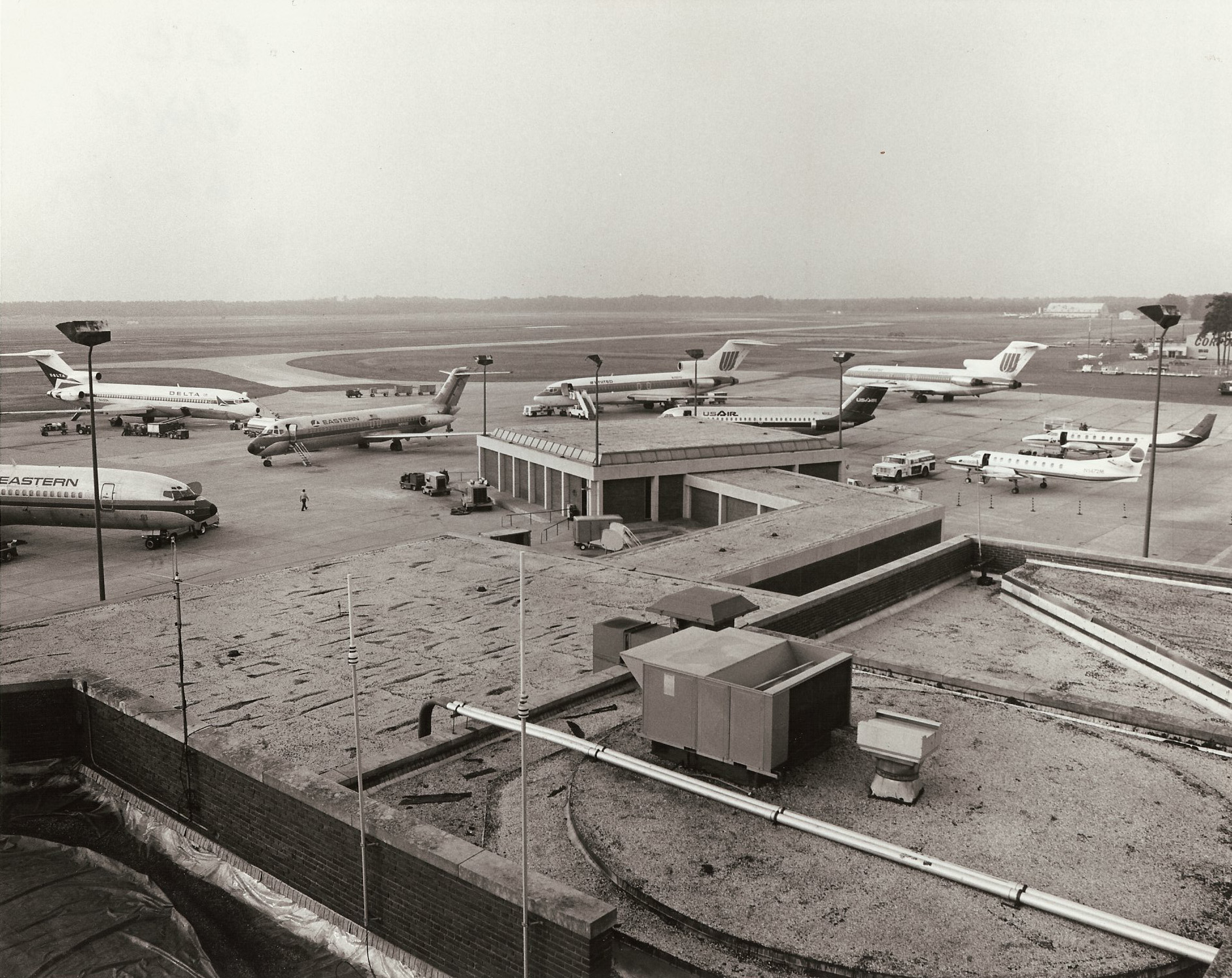
Richmond airport in 1984 when it was the fourth largest airport in Virginia

The February 15, 1985 OAG listed five airlines serving Richmond with jet aircraft including Delta Air Lines, Eastern Air Lines, Piedmont Airlines, United Airlines and USAir. Delta was operating Boeing 737-200s and McDonnell Douglas DC-9-30s nonstop from Atlanta; Eastern was operating Boeing 727-100s, McDonnell Douglas DC-9-30s and McDonnell Douglas DC-9-50s nonstop from Atlanta, Charlotte, Greensboro, New York–JFK and New York–LaGuardia; Piedmont was operating Boeing 727-200s, Boeing 737-200s and Fokker F28 Fellowships nonstop from Baltimore, Charlotte, Chicago–O'Hare, Greensboro, Kinston (NC), Louisville, New York–LaGuardia, Norfolk and Philadelphia, United was operating Boeing 727-100 and Boeing 727-200 nonstop from Baltimore, Chicago–O'Hare and Norfolk, and USAir was operating BAC One-Elevens and McDonnell Douglas DC-9-30s nonstop from Philadelphia and Pittsburgh. one commuter and regional airlines were at Richmond, including Air Virginia which was operating a hub at the airport flying Swearingen Metroliners nonstop from Baltimore, Charlottesville (VA), Lynchburg (VA), New Bern (NC), Newport News, New York–LaGuardia, Newark, Norfolk, Philadelphia, Raleigh/Durham, Roanoke, and Washington–National; Delta Connection operated by Comair with nonstop Saab 340s and Swearingen Metroliners operated on a code sharing basis for Delta from Roanoke; Piedmont Regional Airlines operating Beechcraft 99, de Havilland Canada DHC-7 Dash 7 and Short 330 turboprops with nonstop service flown on a code sharing basis for Piedmont from Baltimore, Newport News, Norfolk and Roanoke; and Wheeler Airlines operating Beechcraft 99 turboprops nonstop from Danville (VA), Raleigh/Durham, Washington–National and Wilmington (DE). By 1986 Wheeler Airlines had a small hub at the airport and had added nonstop flights from Charleston (WV) and Parkersburg (WV).

In 2021, the airport closed Runway 07/25 and converted it to Taxiway H.

== Airlines and destinations ==
=== Passenger ===
Airlines	Destinations	Refs
Allegiant Air	Nashville, St. Petersburg/Clearwater; Seasonal: Punta Gorda (FL)	
American Airlines	Charlotte, Chicago O'Hare, Dallas/Fort Worth, Miami	
American Eagle	Charlotte, Chicago–O'Hare, New York–LaGuardia, Philadelphia; Seasonal: Miami	
Breeze Airways	Charleston (SC), Fort Myers, Hartford, Las Vegas, New Haven, New Orleans, Providence, San Francisco, Tampa; Seasonal: Cancún (begins January 8, 2027), Jacksonville (FL), Long Island/Islip, Los Angeles, Phoenix–Sky Harbor, Sarasota, West Palm Beach	
Delta Air Lines	Atlanta; Seasonal: Detroit	
Delta Connection	Boston, Detroit, Minneapolis/St. Paul, New York–JFK, New York–LaGuardia	
Frontier Airlines	Orlando	
JetBlue	Boston, Fort Lauderdale, Orlando, San Juan	
Southwest Airlines	Baltimore, Chicago–Midway, Dallas–Love (begins June 5, 2027), Denver, Nashville, Orlando, Tampa (begins March 11, 2027)	
United Airlines	Chicago–O'Hare, Denver, San Francisco (begins March 28, 2027); Seasonal: Houston–Intercontinental	
United Express	Chicago–O'Hare, Houston–Intercontinental, Newark, Washington–Dulles	

Destinations from Richmond International Airport

Red = Year-round destination
Green = Seasonal

Blue = Future destination

International destinations from RIC

Red = Year-round destination
Green = Seasonal destination

Blue = Future destination

== Statistics ==
=== Top domestic routes ===
Busiest domestic routes from RIC (May 2025 - April 2026)
Rank	Airport	Passengers	Carriers
1	(Georgia (U.S. state)) Atlanta, Georgia	409,720	Delta
2	Charlotte, North Carolina	299,760	American
3	Orlando, Florida	160,430	Frontier, JetBlue, Southwest
4	Dallas/Fort Worth, Texas	154,160	American
5	Chicago–O'Hare, Illinois	149,010	American, United
6	(New York (state)) New York–LaGuardia, New York	142,490	American, Delta
7	Boston, Massachusetts	131,870	Delta, JetBlue
8	Fort Lauderdale, Florida	107,860	JetBlue
9	Denver, Colorado	104,350	Frontier, Southwest, United
10	Philadelphia, Pennsylvania	78,050	American

=== Airline market share ===
Top airlines at RIC (May 2025 - April 2026)
Rank	Airline	Passenger	Market share
1	American Airlines	947,000	19.10%
2	Delta Air Lines	852,000	17.19%
3	Southwest Airlines	500,000	10.09%
4	Republic Airways	474,000	9.57%
5	JetBlue	459,000	9.26%
	Other	1,725,000	34.79%

=== Annual traffic ===
RIC Airport passenger data 1999–present
Year	Passengers	Year	Passengers	Year	Passengers
1999	2,618,921	2009	3,305,199	2019	4,379,663
2000	2,687,444	2010	3,311,747	2020	1,702,372
2001	2,411,732	2011	3,179,956	2021	3,190,200
2002	2,360,418	2012	3,167,294	2022	4,068,689
2003	2,390,497	2013	3,196,480	2023	4,755,889
2004	2,496,230	2014	3,352,651	2024	4,884,093
2005	2,903,503	2015	3,513,142	2025	4,922,994
2006	3,294,045	2016	3,559,052	2026	
2007	3,634,544	2017	3,657,479	2027	
2008	3,490,356	2018	4,077,763	2028	

== Accidents and incidents ==
- On May 16, 1946, a Douglas C-47 operated by Viking Air Transport crashed 6.3 miles south of Richmond-Byrd Field due to engine issues. All 27 on board were killed.
- On July 19, 1951: Eastern Airlines Flight 601 bound from Newark to Miami suffered severe buffeting after an access door opened in flight over Lynchburg, Virginia and the crew decided to divert to Richmond. A flapless wheels-up landing was made a few miles short of the runway at Curles Neck Farm because the crew feared that the aircraft would disintegrate before they could get to the airport to attempt an emergency landing. There were no fatalities.
- On November 8, 1961: Imperial Airlines Flight 201/8 was destroyed when it crashed and burned following an attempted emergency landing at the airport, all 74 passengers, and three of the five crew members died.
- On July 16, 1964: An Eastern Airlines DC-7B N809D with 76 occupants bound from New York touched down short of Runway 15, suffered a right main gear collapse and slid for 4752 feet. There were no injuries, but the aircraft was damaged beyond repair.
- On May 6, 1980, a Gates Learjet 23, N866JS, rolled inverted landing on Runway 33. The aircraft crashed adjacent to the runway at 03:12 and burst into flame. Both pilots were killed.
- On June 9, 1996, Eastwind Airlines Flight 517 from Trenton, New Jersey, experienced loss of rudder control while on approach to Richmond; however, control was regained shortly after, and the aircraft landed normally. There was one minor injury.

== Military ==
=== Virginia Army National Guard ===
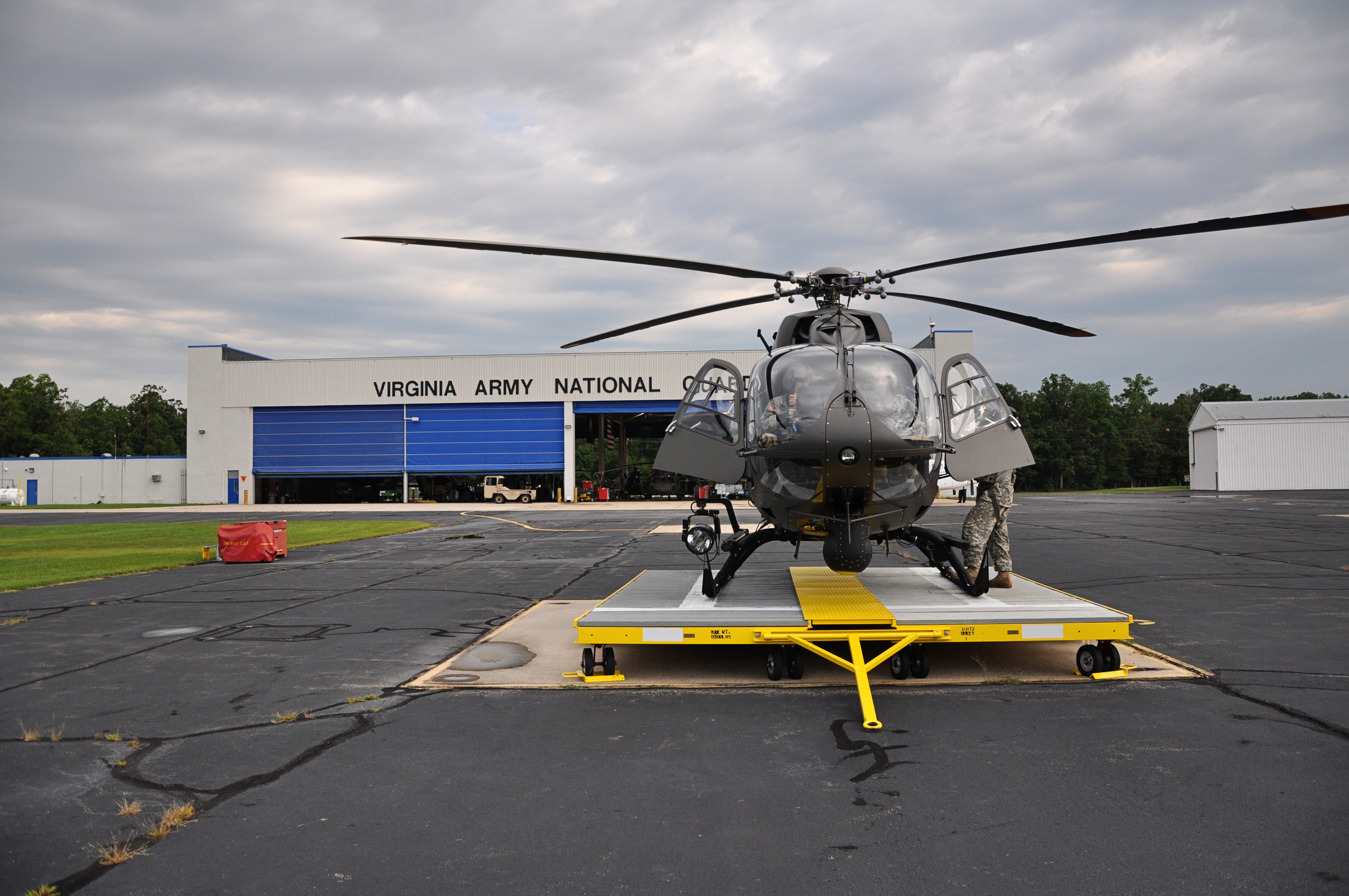
A UH-72 outside of the Facility's main hangar, preparing for a border security deployment

Richmond International Airport serves as an Aviation Support Facility for the Virginia Army National Guard 224th Aviation Regiment. The Army National Guard currently has 25 helicopters including 18 UH-60's, 3 HH-60's, and 4 UH-72's based at the facility. The facility also has 1 C-12 Huron which serves a cargo/passenger transport role.

=== Virginia Air National Guard ===
Until October 2007, the 192d Fighter Wing (192 FW), an Air Combat Command (ACC)-gained unit of the Virginia Air National Guard, maintained an Air National Guard station, operating F-16 Fighting Falcon aircraft from the airport. In late 2007, pursuant to BRAC 2005 action, the 192 FW relinquished its F-16C and F-16D aircraft and moved to Langley AFB (now Joint Base Langley-Eustis), to integrate with the Regular Air Force as an associate unit to the 1st Fighter Wing (1 FW) flying the F-22 Raptor.

== See also ==
- Virginia World War II Army Airfields
