= Blackstone Army Airfield =

Blackstone Army Airfield Allen C. Perkinson Airport
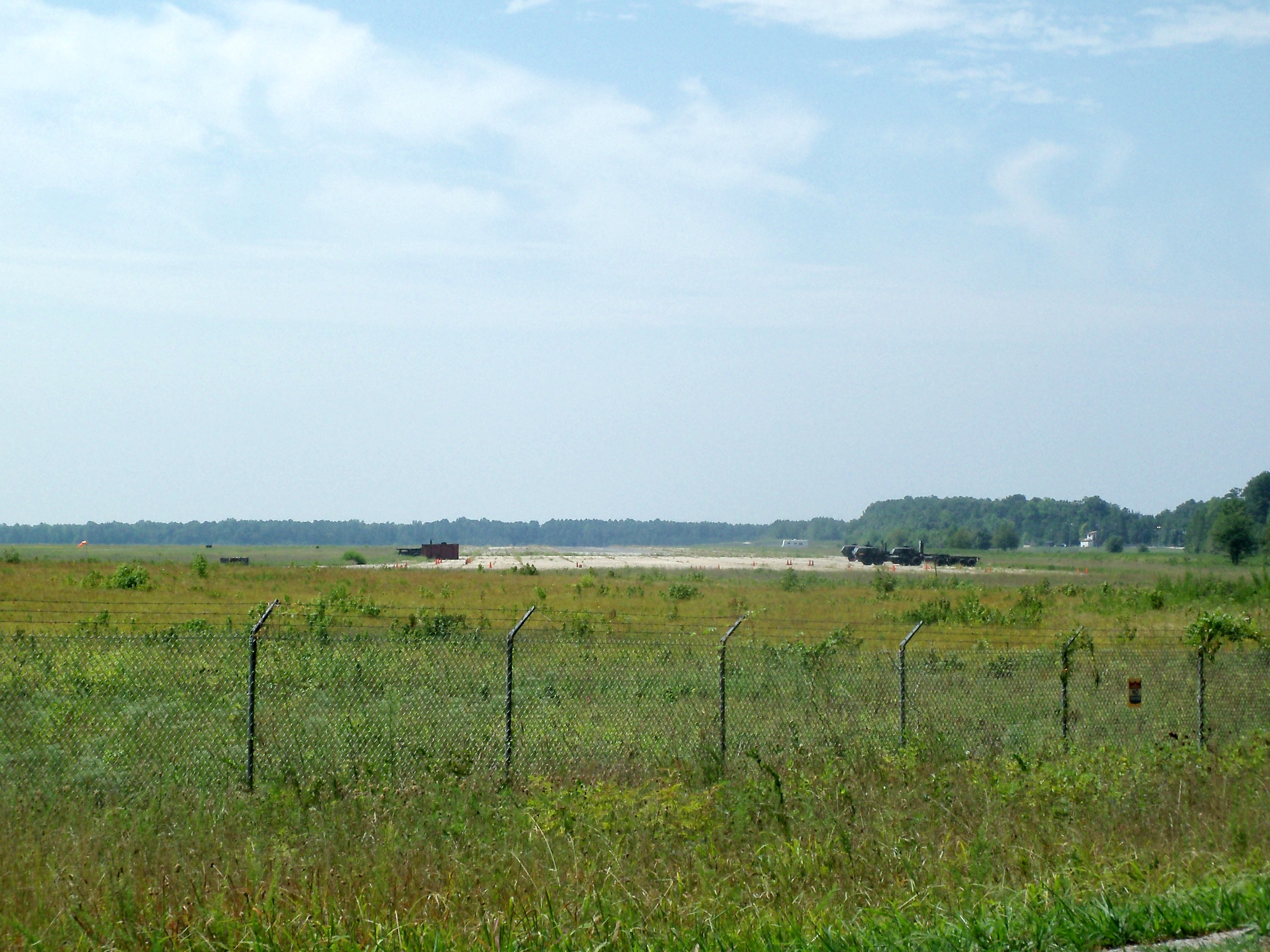
- IATA: BKT; ICAO: KBKT; FAA LID: BKT

Summary
- Airport type: Public/Military
- Owner: U.S. Army & Town of Blackstone
- Location: Fort Pickett / Blackstone, Virginia
- Elevation AMSL: 439 ft (134 m)
- Coordinates: 37°04′26″N 077°57′09″W

Map
- Location within Virginia

Runways
Direction	Length		Surface
Direction	ft	m	Surface
4/22	4,632	1,412	Concrete
1/19	4,032	1,229	Concrete

Statistics (2006)
- Aircraft operations: 3,482
- Source: Federal Aviation Administration

Blackstone Army Airfield (IATA: BKT, ICAO: KBKT, FAA LID: BKT), also known as Allen C. Perkinson Airport, is located two miles (3 km) east of the central business district of Blackstone, a town in Nottoway County, Virginia, United States. It is owned by the United States Army and the Town of Blackstone.

It is named for Allen C. Perkinson, a CAP Virginia Wing Commander in the 1940s.

== History ==
During World War II the airfield was used by the United States Army Air Forces. It was used by Third Air Force as a group training airfield, and later by Air Technical Service Command.

== Facilities and aircraft ==
The airport covers an area of 600 acres (240 ha) which contains two concrete paved runways: 4/22 measuring 4,632 x 150 ft (1,412 x 46 m) and 1/19 measuring 4,032 x 75 ft (1,229 x 23 m). Runway 4/22 can accommodate up to a C-17 airframe(weight capacity of runway is 595,000 lbs). Runway 1/19 accommodates only large UAS traffic. For the 12-month period ending July 31, 2006, the airport had 3,482 aircraft operations, an average of 9 per day: 85% military and 15% general aviation.

== Current tenants ==
- Virginia Air National Guard

== See also ==
- Fort Barfoot
- Virginia Wing Civil Air Patrol
- Virginia World War II Army Airfields
