= Jet Age =

Period of aviation history

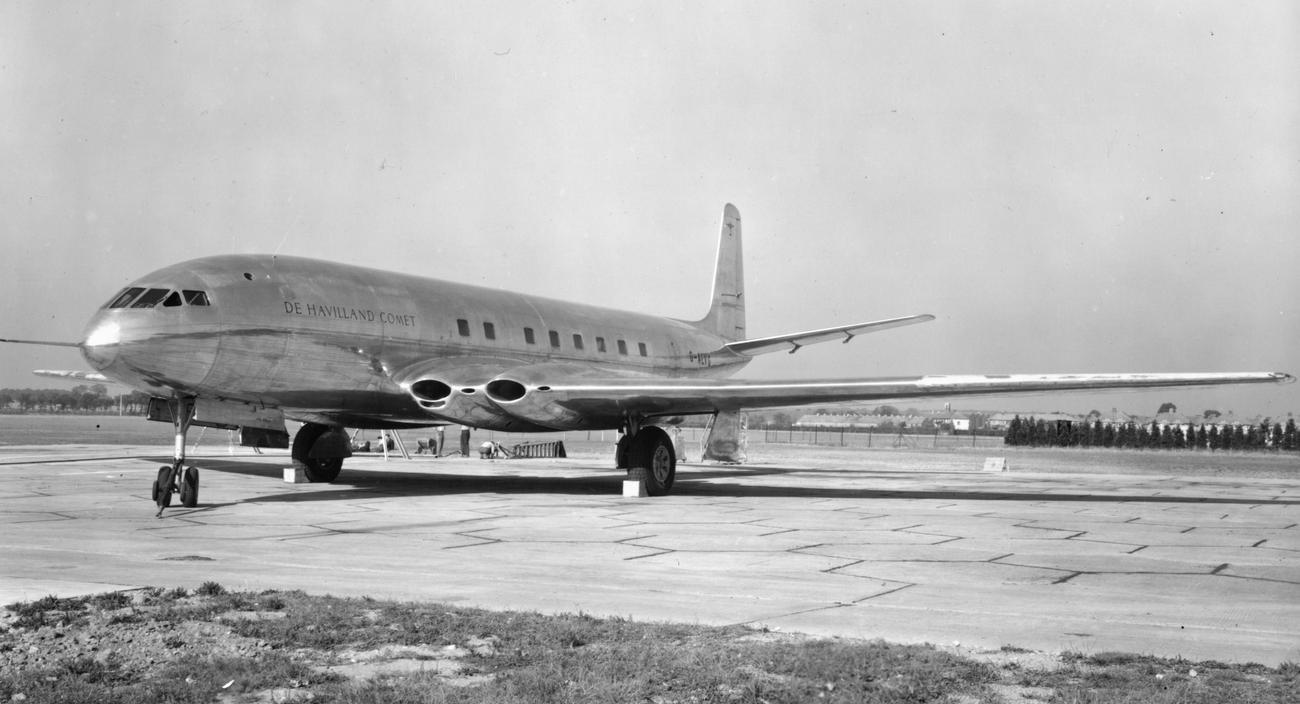
The de Havilland Comet was the first commercial jet airliner and began service on 9 January 1951.

The Jet Age is a period in the history of aviation defined by the advent of aircraft powered by jet turbine engines and the social and cultural changes fostered by commercial jet travel.

Jet airliners were able to fly higher, faster, and farther than older piston‑powered propliners, making transcontinental and intercontinental travel considerably faster and easier. Aircraft leaving North America and crossing the Atlantic Ocean (and later, the Pacific Ocean) could now fly to their destinations non-stop, making much of the world accessible within a single day's travel for the first time. Large jetliners could carry more passengers than piston-powered airliners, which caused air fares to decline and opened international travel to a broader range of socioeconomic groups.

In addition to pure jet engines, turbine-driven propeller engines delivered a smoother ride and better fuel efficiency. One exception to jet-powered domination by large airliners was the contra-rotating propellers turboprop design that powered the Tu-114 (first flight 1957). This airliner was able to match or even exceed the speed, capacity and range of contemporary jets, but such powerplants were only used in large airframes for military planes after 1976.

The introduction of the Concorde supersonic transport (SST) airliner to regular service in 1976 was expected to further revolutionize air travel by shortening travel times dramatically, but the aircraft never found commercial success. After two and a half decades of service, Concorde flights were discontinued in 2003 after a fatal crash near Paris in July 2000 and other factors. This was the only loss of an SST in civilian service. Only one other SST design was used in a civilian capacity, the Soviet era Tu-144, but it was soon withdrawn due to high maintenance and other issues. McDonnell Douglas, Lockheed and Boeing were three U.S. manufacturers that had originally planned to develop various SST designs since the 1960s, but these projects were eventually abandoned for various developmental, cost, and other practical reasons.

== Origins ==
The term "Jet Age" was coined in the late 1940s. At the time, the only jet-powered aircraft in production were military types, most of which were fighters. The expression reflects the recognition that the jet engine had effected, or would soon, a profound change in aeronautics and aviation.

One view is that the jet age began with the invention of the jet engine in the 1930s and 1940s. In the history of military aviation it began in 1944 with the introduction into service of the Arado Ar 234 reconnaissance bomber and the Messerschmitt Me 262 fighter during World War II. In commercial aviation, the jet age was introduced to Britain in 1952 with the first scheduled flight of the de Havilland Comet airliner and to America later in the decade with the first American-built jet airliners.

== Civil aviation ==
The British de Havilland Comet was the first jet airliner to fly (1949), the first in service (1952), and the first to offer a regular transatlantic service (1958). One hundred and fourteen of all versions were built. However, the first jet airliner to provide a sustained and dependable service was the Soviet Tupolev Tu-104 (201 built) which was the only jet airliner in operation worldwide between 1956 and 1958 (the Comet having been withdrawn in 1954 due to structural failure issues). The Comet and Tu-104 were later outstripped in production by the United States' Boeing 707 (which entered service in 1958) and Douglas DC-8, which joined it in the skies over the next few years. Other types of the period included the French Sud Aviation Caravelle. After the 707 began service on the New York to Paris route on October 26, 1958, with Pan American, 1959 became the first year that more transatlantic passengers traveled by air than by sea.

As the number of passengers soared, it became impractical to increase the number of aircraft flying from the major hub airports. International airports like that of Orly Airport in Paris, France would construct terminals around bag-check and customs processing efficiency in response to rising passenger numbers. Instead, designers created even larger widebody airliners and the engine manufacturers responded with larger, more powerful and also more fuel-efficient engines. The first "jumbo jet" was the Boeing 747, and it both increased airport passenger capacity and reduced the cost of air travel, further accelerating the social changes brought about by the Jet Age.

== Military aviation ==
Military aviation had entered the jet age somewhat earlier, during the closing stages of World War II. In the early postwar years, the increasing use of jet aircraft had little significant impact, serving mainly to continue the slow but steady improvements in performance seen in the past. Supersonic flight brought about a step change in aircraft performance. The Bell X-1, first to break the sound barrier in level flight, was an experimental rocket-powered type, and production jets which followed it into service could fly little faster. The first jet aircraft designed from the outset for supersonic flight was the British Fairey Delta 2. On March 10, 1956, it became the first aircraft to fly faster than 1,000 miles per hour (1,600 km/h), heralding an era of "fast jets" typically limited to a speed of Mach 2.2 by the engineering materials available. As jets became faster, their armament changed from guns to missiles. Avionics systems became more complex with radar, fire-control and other systems. Aircraft became larger and more expensive, and so were required to do more to make them economical. All this profoundly affected the nature of military strategy during the Cold War.

== See also ==
- Environmental impact of aviation
- Jet set
- Jet lag
