= Virginia World War II Army Airfields =

Virginia World War II Army Airfields
- Part of World War II
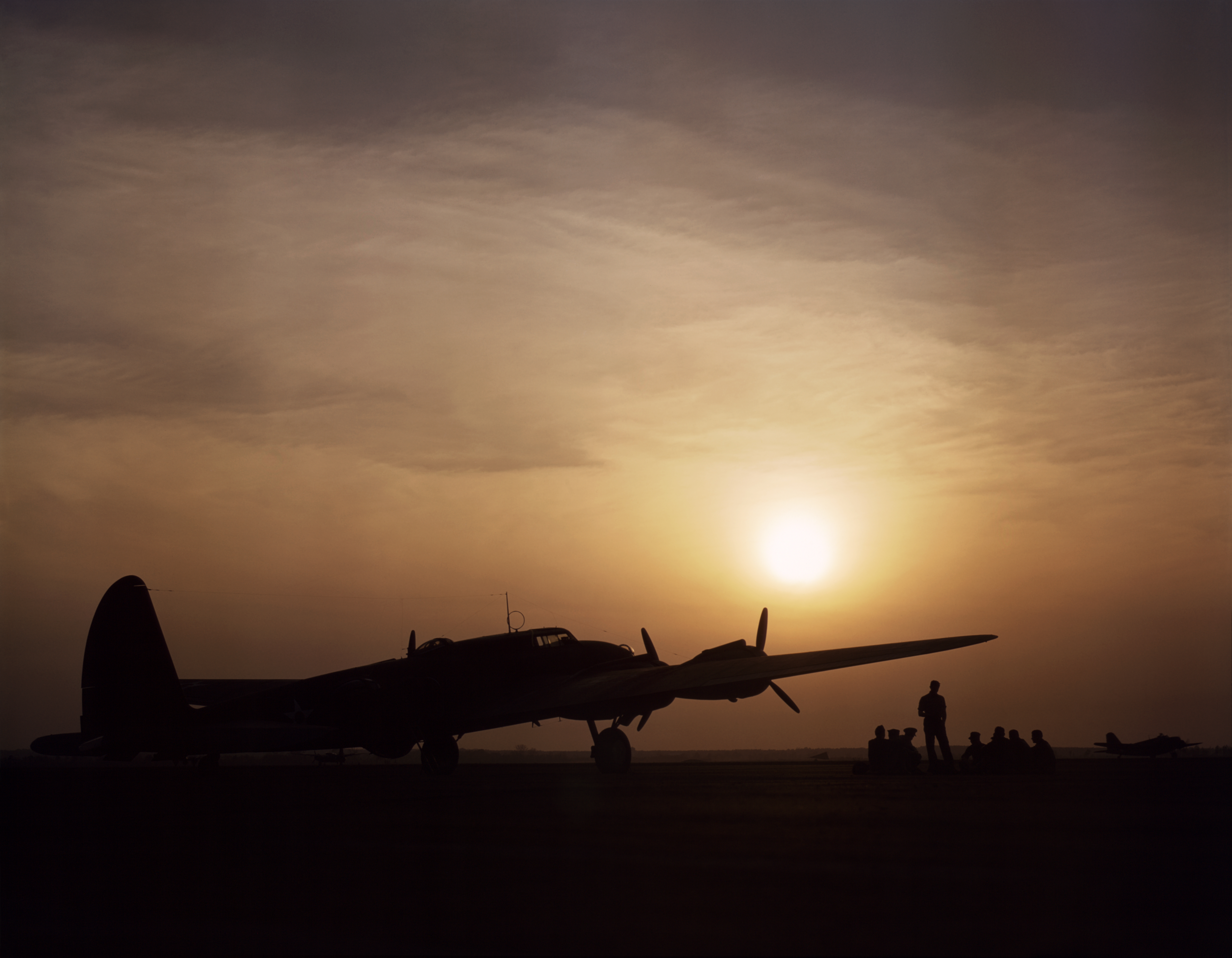
- B-17 at Langley Field, July 1942

Site information
- Type: Army Airfields

Site history
- Built: 1940-1944
- In use: 1940-present

During World War II, the United States Army Air Forces (USAAF) established numerous airfields in Virginia for training pilots and aircrews of USAAF fighters and bombers.

Most of these airfields were under the command of First Air Force or the Army Air Forces Training Command (AAFTC) (A predecessor of the current-day United States Air Force Air Education and Training Command). However the other USAAF support commands (Air Technical Service Command (ATSC); Air Transport Command (ATC) or Troop Carrier Command) commanded a significant number of airfields in a support roles.

It is still possible to find remnants of these wartime airfields. Many were converted into municipal airports, some were returned to agriculture and several were retained as United States Air Force installations and were front-line bases during the Cold War. Hundreds of the temporary buildings that were used survive today, and are being used for other purposes.

== Major airfields ==
Air Technical Service Command

- Blackstone AAF, Blackstone

Supported Fort Pickett
Now: Allen C Perkinson Airport/Blackstone Army Airfield (IATA: BKT, ICAO: KBKT, FAA LID: BKT)

Army Air Force Training Command

- Langley Field AAF, Hampton
  Was also a part of First Air Force

2d Army Air Force Base Unit
Eastern Technical Training Center
Now: Joint Base Langley-Eustis (1947-Pres)

First Air Force

- Norfolk AAF, Norfolk

390th Army Air Force Base Unit
Now: Norfolk International Airport (IATA: ORF, ICAO: KORF, FAA LID: ORF)

- Richmond AAF, Richmond

428th Army Air Force Base Unit
Now: Byrd Field/Richmond International Airport (IATA: RIC, ICAO: KRIC, FAA LID: RIC)
