= Propliner =

Large, propeller-driven commercial aircraft

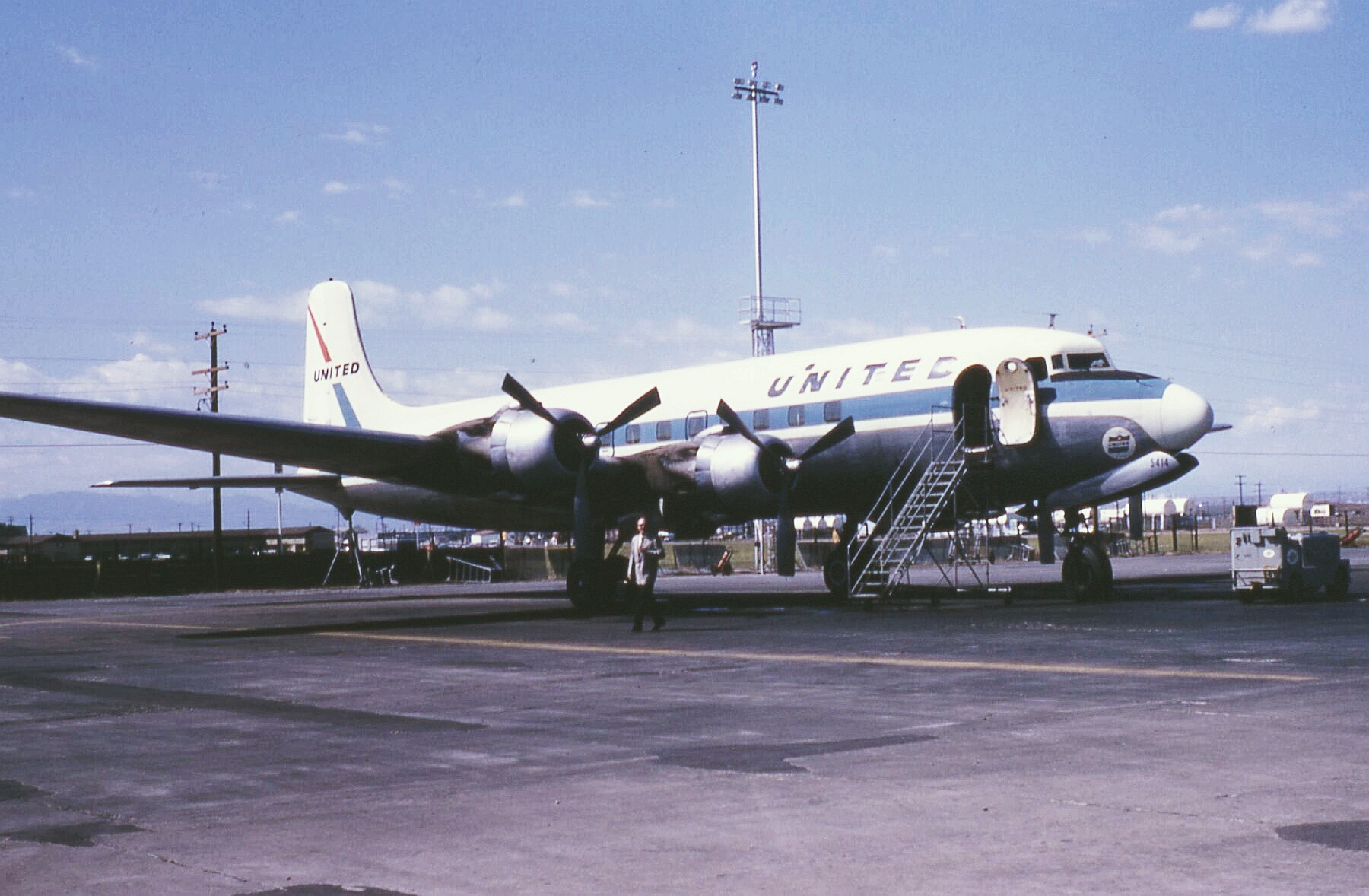
Douglas DC-6 propliner in United Airlines livery

A propliner is a large, propeller-driven airliner. Typically, the term is used for piston engine airliners that flew before the large scale advent of airliners of the jet age. With the notable exception of the de Havilland Albatross and Fokker F-10 of the late 1920s to 1930s, which were largely fabricated of wood, propliners generally featured all-metal wings and structural members, totally or partially retractable landing gear, and two, three, or four engines. A few might deviate from these characteristics with fixed landing gear, such as the Albatross, Fokker 110, and Lockheed Vega.

The first all metal passenger service propliner was the Handley Page Type W in the 1920s. Then the Boeing 247 made its first flight in 1933, with the Douglas DC-1 and Douglas DC-2 closely following in response. The most successful is the Douglas DC-3, which was produced in the thousands, and is still in widespread use; while the Dewoitine D.338 and SNCASE SE.161 Languedoc were developed in France and Germany produced the Focke-Wulf Fw 200 Condor and Junkers Ju 90. In Japan a license-built version of the Douglas DC-3 was developed as the Nakajima L2D and the smaller Mitsubishi MC-20 was locally developed. In the Netherlands Fokker, previously one of the leading manufacturers of airliners before the Boeing 247 appeared, became the European sales agent for Douglas DC-2s and DC-3s. Most British-built aircraft of the period were less advanced, such as the Avro 642 Eighteen and de Havilland Express; one exception was the Armstrong Whitworth Ensign. Other American-designed propliners included the Douglas DC-4, Douglas DC-5 and Martin 2-0-2. None of these models featured cabin pressurization.

With the earlier introduction of the Boeing 307 Stratoliner and the experimental Douglas DC-4E, a second generation of propliners emerged. These technologically more modern aircraft featured cabin pressurization systems allowing greater comfort by allowing aircraft to fly higher and above much of the lower altitude weather, although it was not until the Lockheed Constellation, followed by the Douglas DC-6 and Douglas DC-7, that this design advance became common.

By the 1950s the traveling public were increasingly finding themselves being transported upon long range pressurized propliners such as the Boeing 377 Stratocruiser, Lockheed L-1049 Super Constellation and Lockheed L-1649 Starliner, or shorter ranged twin engined Martin 4-0-4 and Convair CV-240, CV-340 and CV-440 aircraft. British propliners included the Airspeed Ambassador, Vickers VC.1 Viking and Handley Page Hermes, while the Canadair North Star (a development of the Douglas DC-4) was produced in Canada. The Breguet Deux-Ponts and Hurel-Dubois HD.31 were manufactured in France; and the Soviet Union produced the postwar twin-engined Ilyushin Il-12 and Ilyushin Il-14, both produced in quantity through the 1950s. Finally, the Swedish SAAB Scandia was produced in small numbers.

== See also ==
- De Havilland Canada Dash 8
- Fokker 50
- Tupolev Tu-114
