= Breeze Airways =

American airline

- Breeze Airways Airbus A220-300
IATA	ICAO	Call sign
MX	MXY	MOXY
- Founded: July 31, 2018; 8 years ago as Moxy Airways
- Commenced operations: May 27, 2021; 5 years ago as Breeze Airways
- AOC #: BAGA439Q
- Operating bases: Akron/Canton; Charleston (SC); Fort Myers; Hartford; New Orleans; Norfolk; Orlando; Providence; Provo; Raleigh/Durham; Tampa; Vero Beach
- Frequent-flyer program: Breezy Rewards
- Fleet size: 67
- Destinations: 89
- Parent company: Breeze Aviation Group, Inc.
- Headquarters: Cottonwood Heights, Utah, United States
- Founder: David Neeleman (founder & CEO)
- Employees: 2,262
- Website: flybreeze.com

Breeze Airways is an American low-cost airline headquartered in Cottonwood Heights, Utah. It was founded by David Neeleman, who previously co-founded Morris Air, WestJet, JetBlue and Azul Brazilian Airlines. Breeze's operations launched on May 27, 2021, with its inaugural flight from Tampa International Airport to Charleston International Airport.

== History ==
=== Conceptualization and establishment ===
In June 2018, Neeleman planned to launch a new American airline, tentatively named Moxy Airways, with capital from former Air Canada CEO Robert Milton, former ILFC CEO Henri Courpron, former JetBlue board chairman Michael Lazarus, and himself. They noted that following the US consolidation of airlines, all eleven major carriers in the country that were profitable had all existed at least twenty years (except JetBlue, which Neeleman had co-founded in 2000); and there was an opportunity for a competitive carrier. They also noted that the country's four largest airlines carried 80% of domestic US passengers in 2017, and that due to the loss of service to smaller markets, US domestic air capacity had remained stagnant from 2007 to 2017, while the economy had expanded by 34%.

Similarly to low-cost carriers (LCCs), the airline planned to offer point-to-point flights from smaller, secondary airports such as Norfolk International Airport, Westchester County Airport, or Providence's T. F. Green Airport, bypassing larger airline hubs for shorter travel times. The airline reportedly also considered longer flights to South America and Europe. However unlike LCCs, proposed intentions included operating two cabins of service consisting of a first class and economy cabin, unlike the all-economy business model typically operated by LCCs. It would offer spacious seats and free Wi-Fi, like Azul and JetBlue, but charge fees for snacks and advance seat assignments, like ultra low-cost carriers Allegiant Air or Spirit Airlines. Additionally, its aircraft would not feature seatback screens for its in-flight entertainment, instead planning to offer streamed entertainment through personal electronic devices. For its launch of operations, the company ordered 60 Bombardier CS300s (later known as the Airbus A220-300), soliciting Chinese lessors to finance 18 aircraft, to be delivered starting in 2021. To accelerate the airline's launch to 2020, the company initially planned to use secondhand Embraer 195 aircraft from Azul.

On February 7, 2020, the airline's name was announced as Breeze Airways, abandoning the "Moxy" name, as it created ambiguity with Marriott's "Moxy Hotels" trademark, although the airline would continue to reference its previous name in its associated airline codes (MX/MXY) and callsign (MOXY). The airline's branding, logo, colors and livery were developed by Brazilian airline marketing specialist, Gianfranco "Panda" Beting, Azul's co-founder and creator of Azul's branding, as well as that for TAP Air Portugal and Transbrasil. Neeleman proposed the tagline, the "World's Nicest Airline." On February 20, 2020, the airline established its headquarters in Cottonwood Heights, Utah.

=== Launch ===
Breeze had projected its operational launch in 2020 through the acquisition of Compass Airlines, subsequently cancelling that acquisition and pushing its launch to 2021. In addition to the Embraer 195, the airline also planned to introduce the Embraer 190 to launch short-haul, regional services prior to the introduction of the Airbus A220-300 for longer flights. On March 10, 2021, the airline received federal approval from the United States Department of Transportation (USDOT) to begin operations, and was later issued its air operator's certificate on May 14, 2021. The following week, Breeze began selling tickets and then launched its first flight the week after that, on May 27, 2021.

=== Post-launch ===
In the initial years following launch, the airline's network expanded, consisting of several domestic short-haul and transcontinental routes within the United States, as well as charter operations. During 2023, the airline began the process to operate international flights, submitting an application to the USDOT in May 2023 to operate flights to Mexico. Neeleman announced in November 2023 that the airline also intended to operate flights to Europe.

== Corporate affairs ==
Breeze is headquartered in Cottonwood Heights, Utah, in the Salt Lake City metropolitan area. Its founder and CEO is David Neeleman. Tom Doxey—who had previously worked for Allegiant Air, United Airlines, and US Airways—was appointed as company president on June 9, 2022. He announced that he was transitioning to an advisory role in August 2024.

== Destinations ==
=== Interline agreements ===
- Alaska Airlines

== Fleet ==
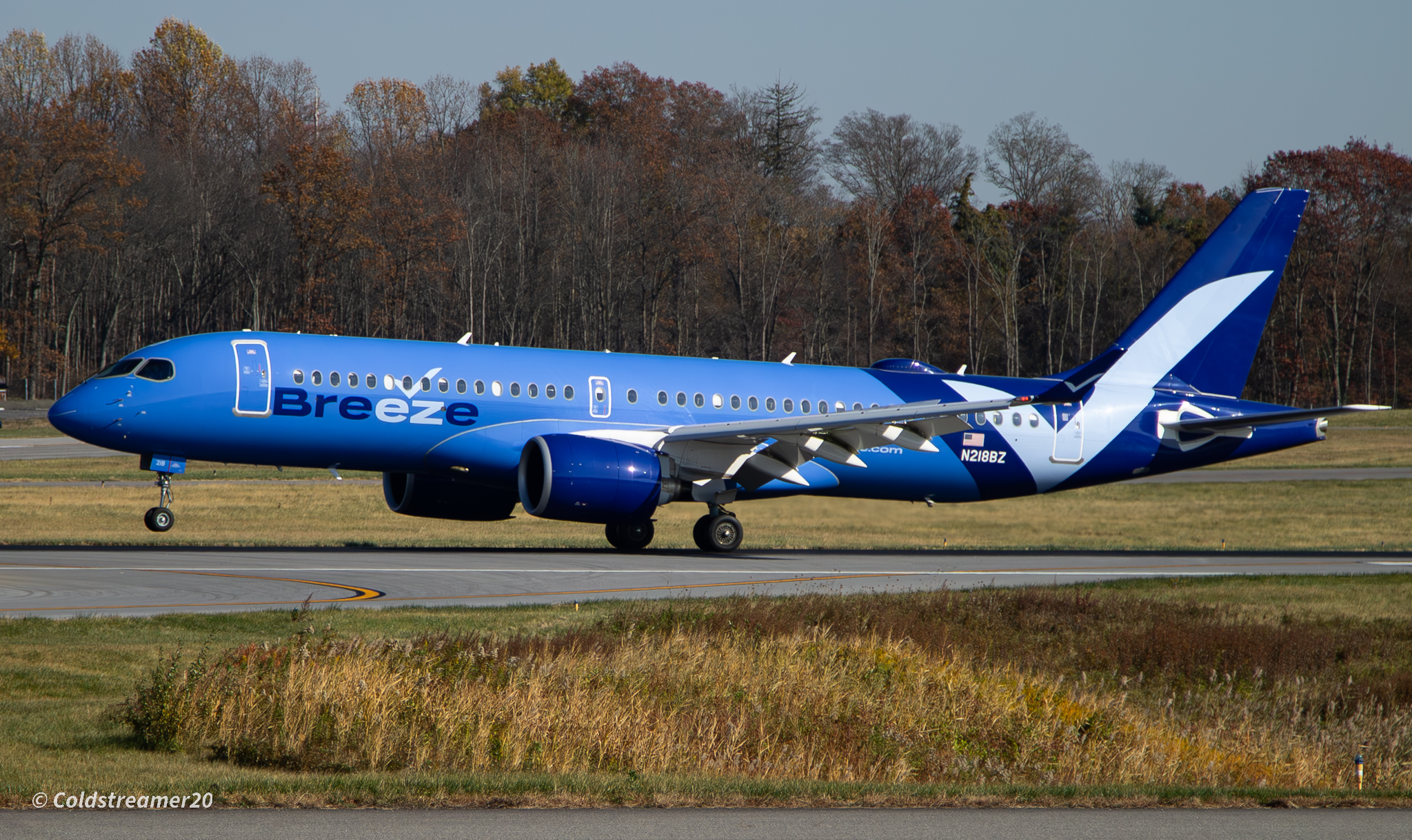
Breeze Airbus A220-300

=== Current fleet ===
As of October 2026, Breeze Airways operates an all Airbus A220 fleet consisting of the following aircraft:

Breeze Airways fleet
Aircraft	In service	Orders	Passengers					Notes
Aircraft	In service	Orders	F	Y+	Y	Total	Ref	Notes
Airbus A220-300	67	23	12	45	80	137		
Total	67	23						

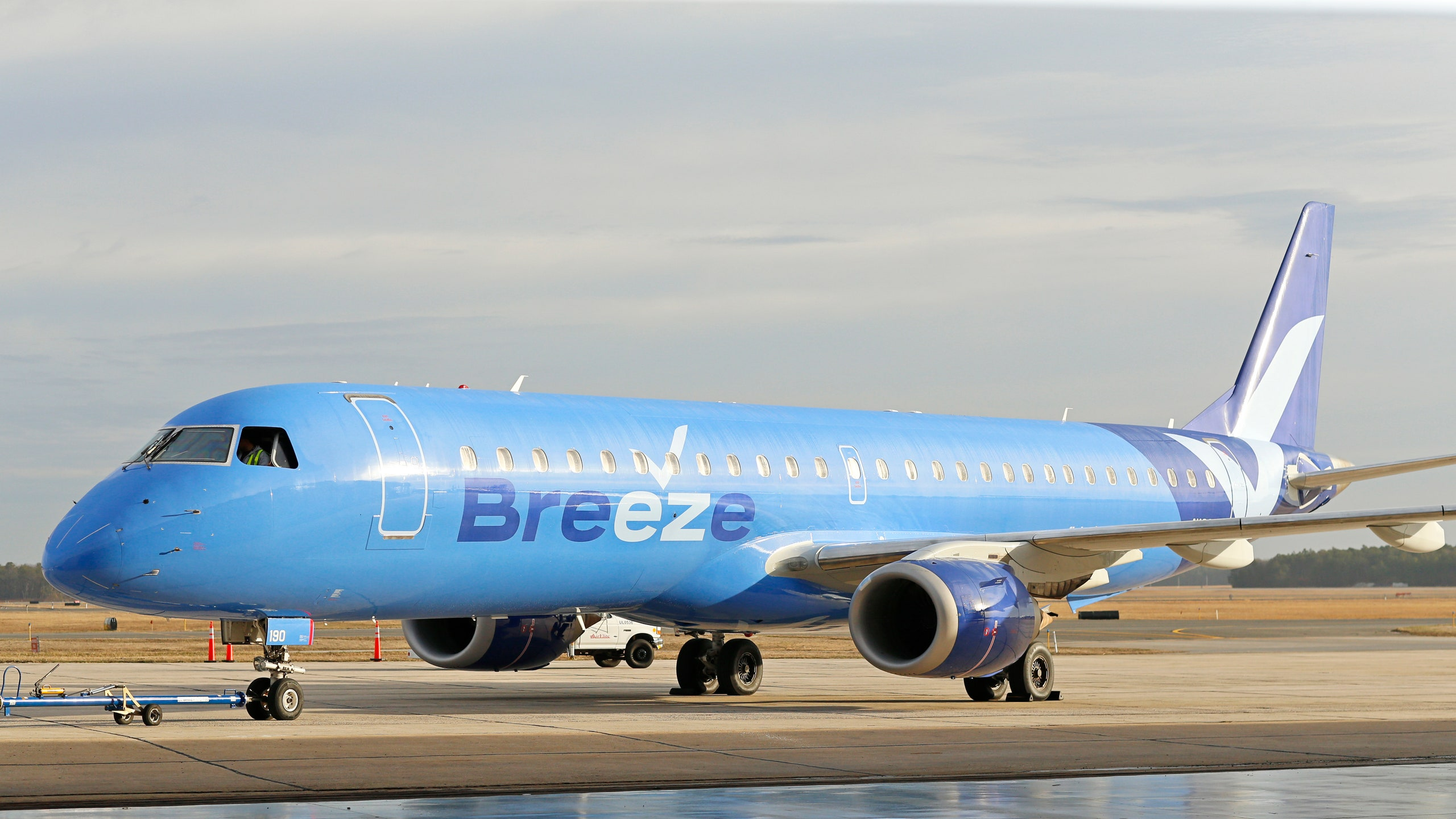
Former Breeze Embraer 195

=== Former fleet ===
Breeze Airways has previously operated the following aircraft:

Breeze Airways former fleet
Aircraft	Total	Introduced	Retired	Notes
Embraer 190	10	2021	2026	
Embraer 195	7	2020	2025	

=== Fleet development ===
On July 17, 2018, the airline signed a memorandum of understanding with Airbus for 60 A220-300 aircraft to be delivered from 2021, with the order firmed in January 2019. The order included options for 60 additional A220s. Following the airline's revised plans to launch operations before the delivery of its A220 aircraft, Breeze agreed to sublease up to 30 Embraer 195s from Azul in order to serve short-haul routes, although the total number received was dependent on LOT Polish Airlines exercising its lease options. The airline additionally agreed to lease up to fifteen Embraer 190s from Nordic Aviation Capital. The airline received its first Embraer 195 on December 30, 2020, and later its first Embraer 190 in February 2021. Its Embraer 190s were previously operated by Air Canada, and Embraer 195s by Air Europa Express and Azul.

On April 26, 2021, it was announced that Breeze had firmed options for an additional 20 A220-300 aircraft, bringing its total orders up to 80 aircraft of the type, although Airbus listed the order under an undisclosed customer. Breeze itself did not announce the order until September 13, 2021, when it was also announced that the order was the result of exercising purchase options. The airline's first Airbus A220-300 was delivered on October 26, 2021, with the aircraft entering service on May 25, 2022.

On February 20, 2024, Breeze announced that it had firmed options for an additional 10 A220-300 aircraft, bringing its total orders up to 90 aircraft of the type. The airline also announced that its Embraer fleet would transition from scheduled passenger services to charter operations and reduce from 16 aircraft to 10 by the end of 2024. By May 2025, its Embraer 195 aircraft were retired.

== Service concept ==
=== Ticket types ===
Breeze offers four ticket types for its two classes of service, ranging from "No Flex Fare" tickets that do not allow for itinerary changes, to "Nice", "Nicer", and "Nicest" tickets that progressively include more and more amenities such as increased legroom, additional baggage allowance, complimentary in-flight catering and Wi-Fi internet access.

The "Nice" and "Nicer" ticket types were introduced at the airline's launch in 2021, with the former as the no-frills ticket and the latter including additional amenities, with both offering free itinerary changes and cancellations. In October 2021, Breeze announced the "Nicest" ticket type to coincide with the launch of its Airbus A220-300 service in 2022, which introduced the airline's first class seating. In March 2024, the "No Flex Fare" ticket type was introduced, which did not allow for itinerary changes and offered partial credit for cancellations, comparable to basic economy class tickets on other airlines.

=== Services ===
Breeze offers a buy-on-board service on all of its flights, with free streamable in-flight entertainment available on most flights operated by its Airbus aircraft (was also offered on prior Embraer aircraft.) In March 2022, Breeze announced plans to offer inflight Viasat Wi-Fi internet access from October 2022 on its A220 aircraft. However, ongoing delays postponed the initial implementation of this service to 2023, with completion of Wi-Fi access on its entire A220 fleet later expected in 2024.

=== Seating ===
Breeze's first class seating, referred to as "Breeze Ascent", is available only on its Airbus A220 aircraft, the seats of which are configured in a 2–2 layout. The airline's economy class seating consists of both "Extra Legroom" and "Standard" seats, the seats of which are configured in a 2–3 layout on the A220, and in a 2–2 layout on the Embraer 190 aircraft.

In 2022, the airline announced an alternative seating configuration for its A220s depending on route or seasonal demand, with fewer first class seats and additional "extra legroom" seats, which later became the standard seating configuration for the entire A220 fleet.

== Frequent-flyer program ==
Breezy Rewards is the airline's frequent-flyer program as well as its travel credit system, under which BreezePoints is its currency. The program is a revenue-based accrual system where passengers earn points based on cash amount spent, including base fare amounts and ancillary fees such as seat selection and baggage allowance fees. Points earned can also vary based on the ticket type purchased. Points can be redeemed toward payments made with the airline, and expire two years after originally issued.
