= Norfolk International Airport =

International Airport located in Norfolk, Virginia

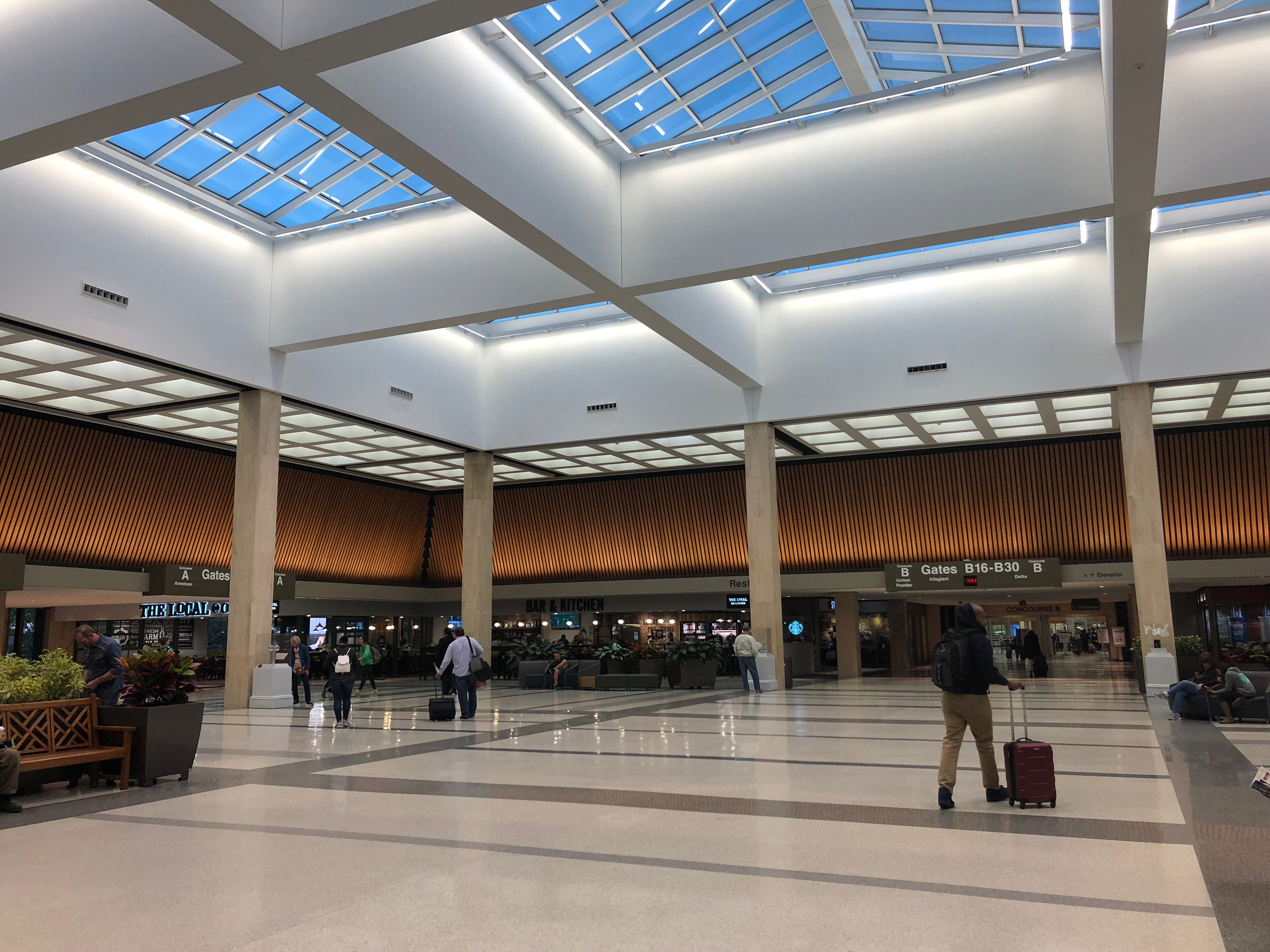
- The Main Departures Building at ORF
- IATA: ORF; ICAO: KORF; FAA LID: ORF

Summary
- Airport type: Public
- Owner/Operator: Norfolk Airport Authority
- Serves: Hampton Roads, Outer Banks
- Location: Norfolk, Virginia, U.S.
- Opened: 1938
- Operating base for: Breeze Airways
- Time zone: Eastern Time Zone (UTC−05:00)
- Elevation AMSL: 26 ft (7.9 m)
- Coordinates: 36°53′41″N 076°12′04″W
- Website: NorfolkAirport.com

Maps
- Diagram
- Interactive map of Norfolk International Airport

Runways
Direction	Length		Surface
Direction	ft	m	Surface
05/23	9,001	2,744	Asphalt/concrete
14/32 [CLOSED]	4,875	1,486	Asphalt

Statistics (2025)
- Total passengers: 4,892,594 ▲0.6%
- Cargo (lbs.): 37,895,577
- Source: Norfolk Airport Authority and Federal Aviation Administration

Norfolk International Airport (IATA: ORF, ICAO: KORF, FAA LID: ORF), is a regional commercial and cargo airport located seven miles (11 km) northeast of downtown Norfolk, Virginia. It is owned and operated by the Norfolk Airport Authority, a bureau under the municipal government. The airport serves the Hampton Roads metropolitan area of southeast Virginia (along with Newport News/Williamsburg International Airport in Newport News) as well as northeast North Carolina.

The Federal Aviation Administration (FAA) in 2025 categorized it as a medium hub airport serving commercial passengers and a small hub airport for cargo operations.

Also in 2025, Norfolk International Airport was the 65th busiest airport in the United States with a passenger count of 2,466,474 people. This is a 0.88% increase from 2024. It is the fourth-busiest airport in Virginia in terms of passengers served annually, behind Dulles International Airport and Ronald Reagan Washington National Airport, and nearly tied with, but just behind, Richmond International.

== History ==
=== 1920s ===
In 1926, Norfolk citizens experienced their first commercial flights on the Mitten Line, operated by Philadelphia Rapid Transit Air Service, Inc. The service offered round-trip flights to Washington and Philadelphia for a brief period before high costs led to its discontinuation. In 1929, Ben Epstein, a World War I veteran pilot, established an air taxi service between Norfolk and Richmond from his airfield on Granby Street. The Ludington Line commenced the first daily scheduled service from Epstein's field to Washington, D.C. During this era, air travel was a special occasion marked by families dressing in their finest attire to board the 10-passenger Fokker Trimotor.

=== 1930s ===
Commercial air travel faced challenges in 1932 when the Navy objected to the expansion of the Granby Street field due to its proximity to Norfolk Naval Air Station. Operations moved to Glenrock Airport, but the Great Depression caused all commercial flights to be suspended indefinitely, grounding Norfolk for five years. In 1938, Norfolk Municipal Airport was established on the site of the former Truxton Manor Golf Course, featuring a 3,500-foot runway and a passenger terminal, which was completed in 1940.

=== 1940s ===
During World War II, Norfolk Municipal Airport played a crucial role in the war effort. The Army Air Corps took over operations from 1942 to 1947, expanding the runway and adding two more to accommodate increased flights. After the war, the airport returned to city control, and commercial travel resumed with the introduction of new airlines. In 1948, Piedmont Airlines began operations, coinciding with the groundbreaking for a modern terminal building.

=== 1950s ===
By the early 1950s, Norfolk had more daily flights than New York's La Guardia Airport. In 1950, the Norfolk Port and Industrial Authority (NPIA) took over airport management, boasting Norfolk Municipal Airport as one of the nation's finest and busiest. The new terminal was officially dedicated in 1951.

=== 1960s ===
The 1960s witnessed the transition from propeller-driven aircraft to jets. Norfolk Municipal Airport easily adapted to the demands for longer runways and taxiways, with jetliners becoming the norm. In 1968, the airport was officially recognized as the air transportation center for the entire region and was renamed Norfolk Regional Airport.

=== 1970s ===
In 1974, Norfolk Regional Airport dedicated its new terminal, expanding further with additional land acquisition and the addition of Federal Customs facilities in 1976. New facilities for the fire station, maintenance depot, and air traffic control tower were also planned and completed as needed. The airport's name was also changed from Norfolk Regional Airport to the modern name, Norfolk International Airport.

=== 1980s ===
The 1980s saw significant developments, including the opening of a new general aviation facility and air cargo terminal, along with expanded parking facilities. In 1988, the supervising body Norfolk Port and Industrial Authority was renamed to Norfolk Airport Authority.

=== 1990s ===
Norfolk International Airport continued to grow in the 1990s, expanding its air cargo terminal, parking facilities, and passenger terminal. In 1991, a new concourse extension with 10 additional gates was completed, along with a modern fire station and FAA air traffic control tower. The airport also embraced the digital age by launching its first website and installing internet access booths for travelers.

=== 21st century ===
Starting in 2018, the Norfolk Airport Authority has undertaken a multi-phase plan to improve airport terminals, concourses, the general aviation terminal, dining and retail facilities, in-airport advertising, and customer service known as Transform ORF. Renovations and improvements to enhance the passenger experience are ongoing, with over $1Bn allocated for capital development projects planned for 2024 and beyond. These developments include the rehabilitation of main Runway 05/23, a new moving walkway for the Sky Bridge, renovations for the arrivals terminal, addition of a rental car facility, a new unified ticketing hall and baggage area, expansions for Concourse A, a new international Processing Facility for Customs and Border Patrol, and a Courtyard By Marriott Airport Hotel; additionally, this plan will also reserve space for a possible future Concourse C. On August 25, 2025, it was announced that Norfolk International Airport would be closing Runway 14/32 to make room for additional developments; these include a new de-icing facility and the straightening of Robin Hood Road, one of the main entrances to the airport.

On January 10, 2026, Norfolk International Airport will start its first commercial international flight since 2001 when Breeze Airways will offer direct flights to Cancun International Airport.

== Facilities ==
The airport covers 1,300 acres (530 hectares) at an elevation of 27 feet (8.2 m). Its main runway, 5–23, is 9,001 by 150 feet (2,744 by 46 m), and crosswind runway 14–32 is 4,875 by 150 feet (1,486 by 46 m).

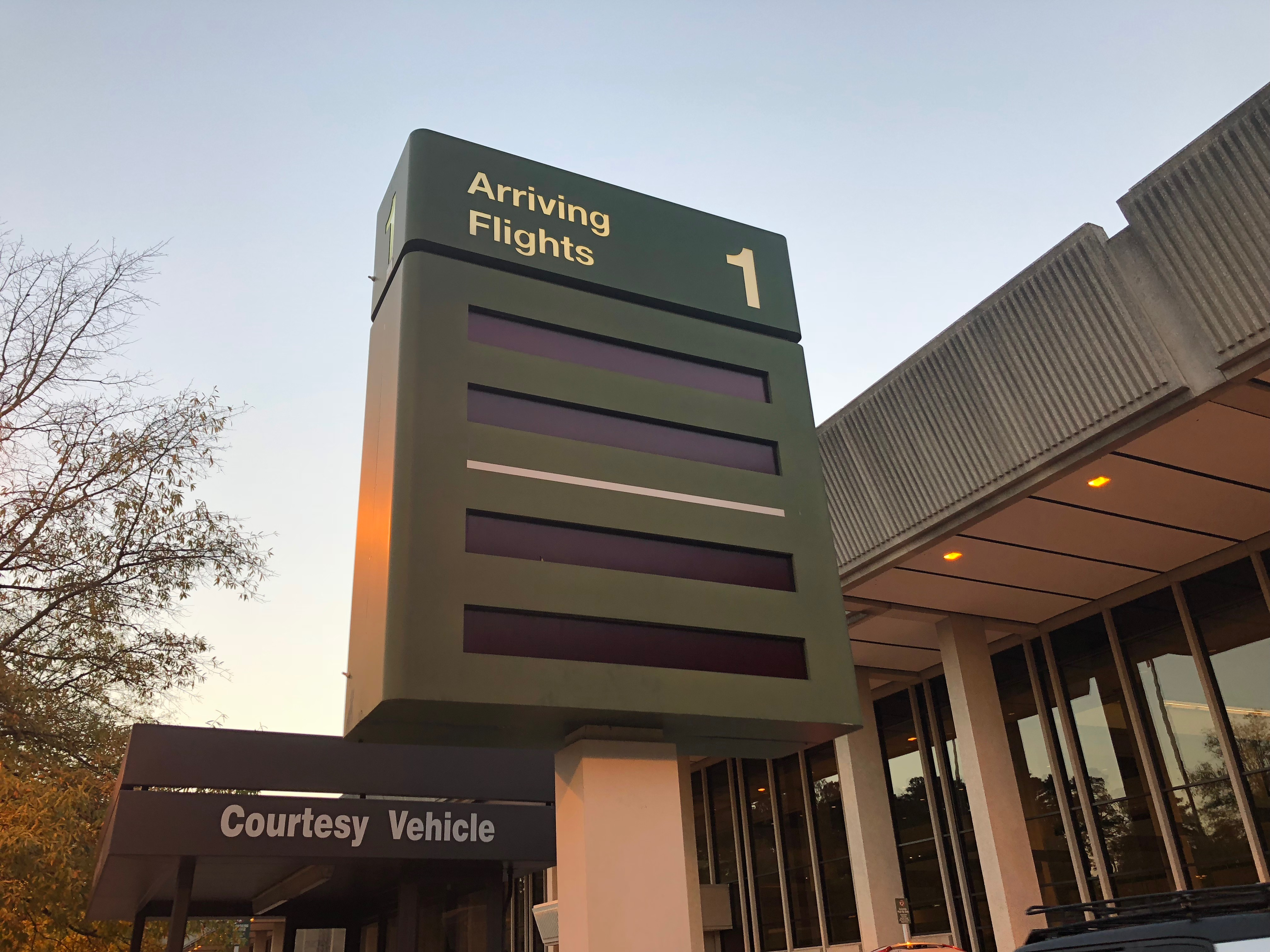
An arriving flights sign

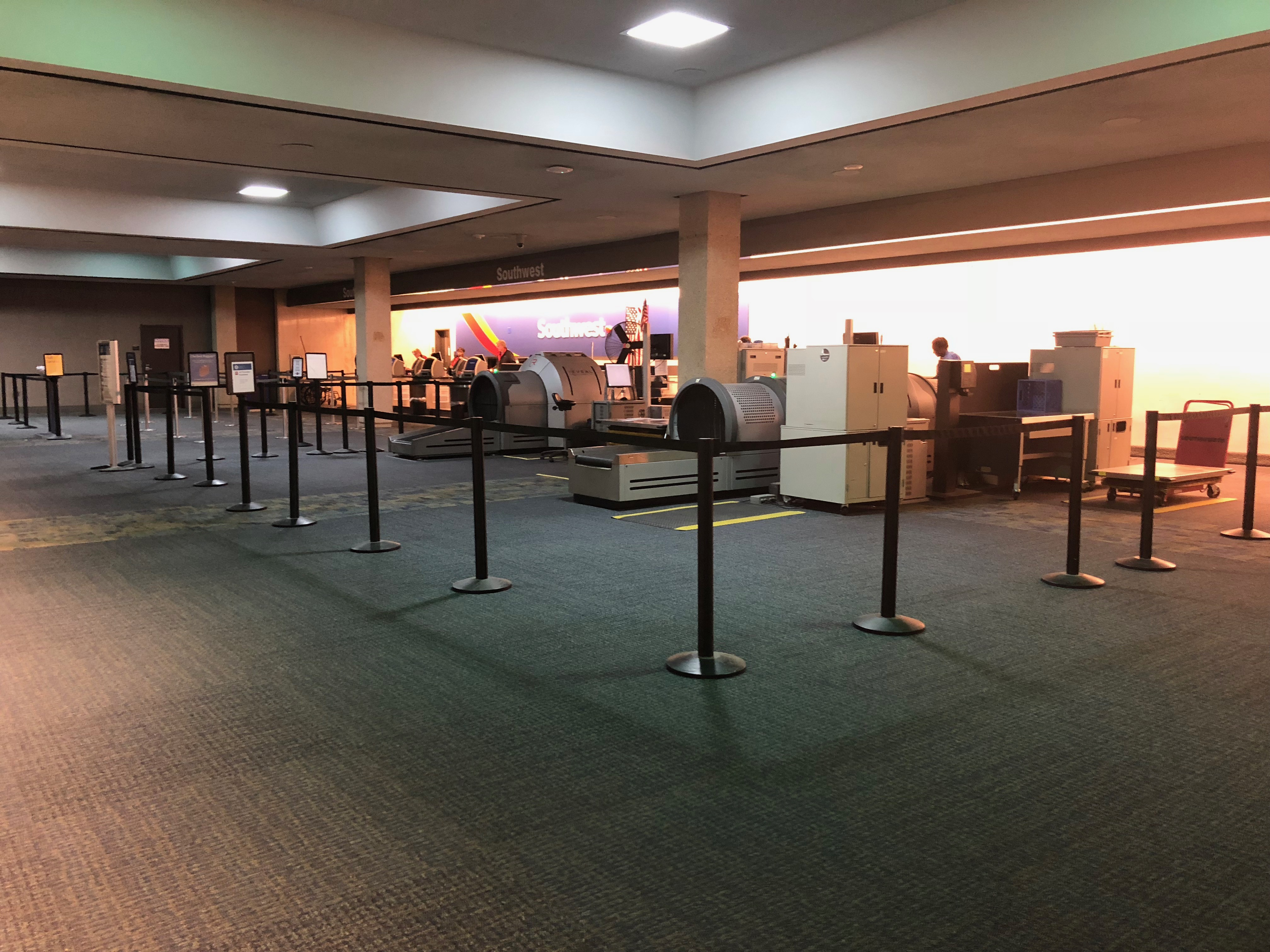
Southwest Airlines check-in counter

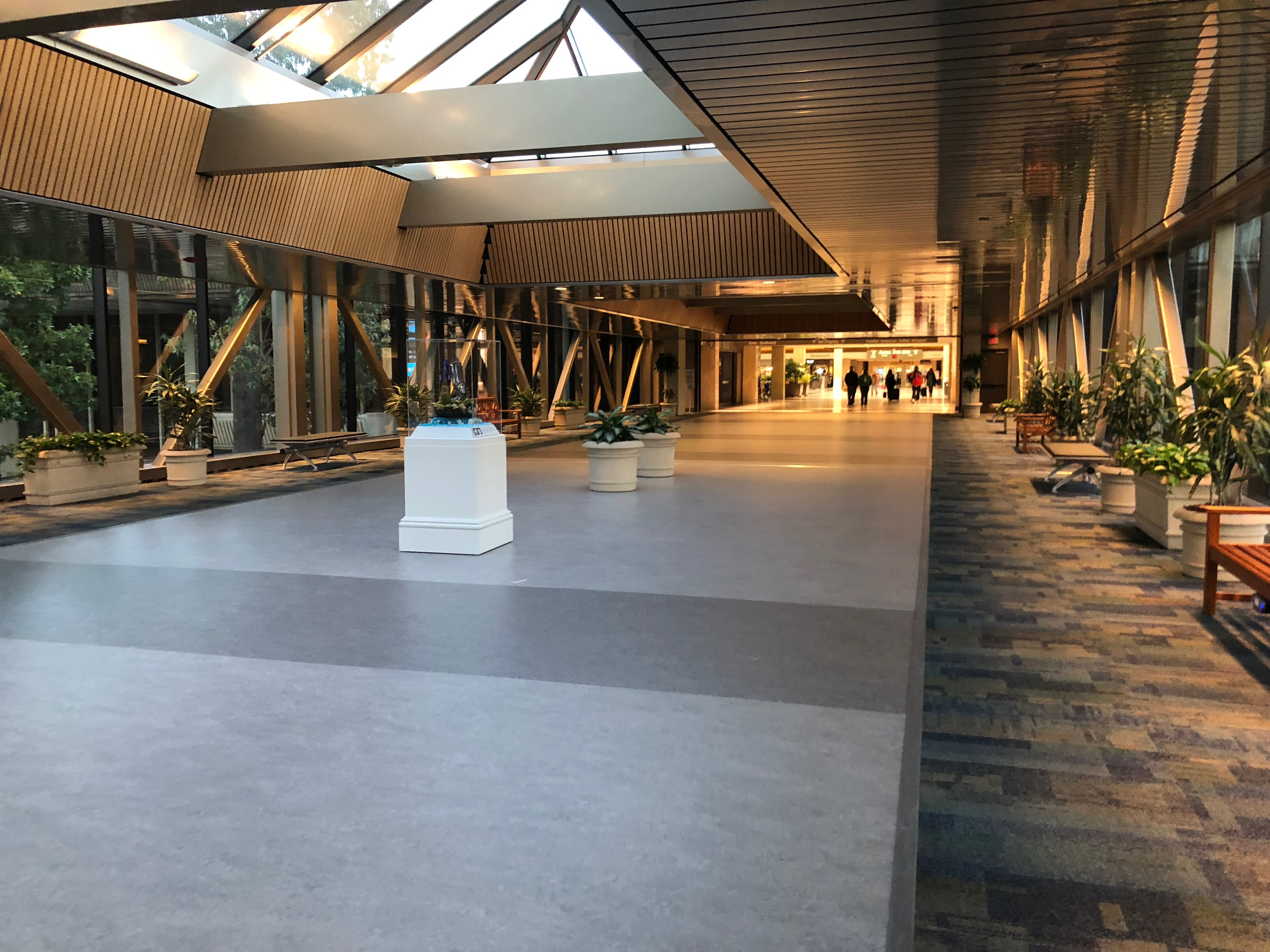
Bridge that connects the Arrivals and Departures buildings

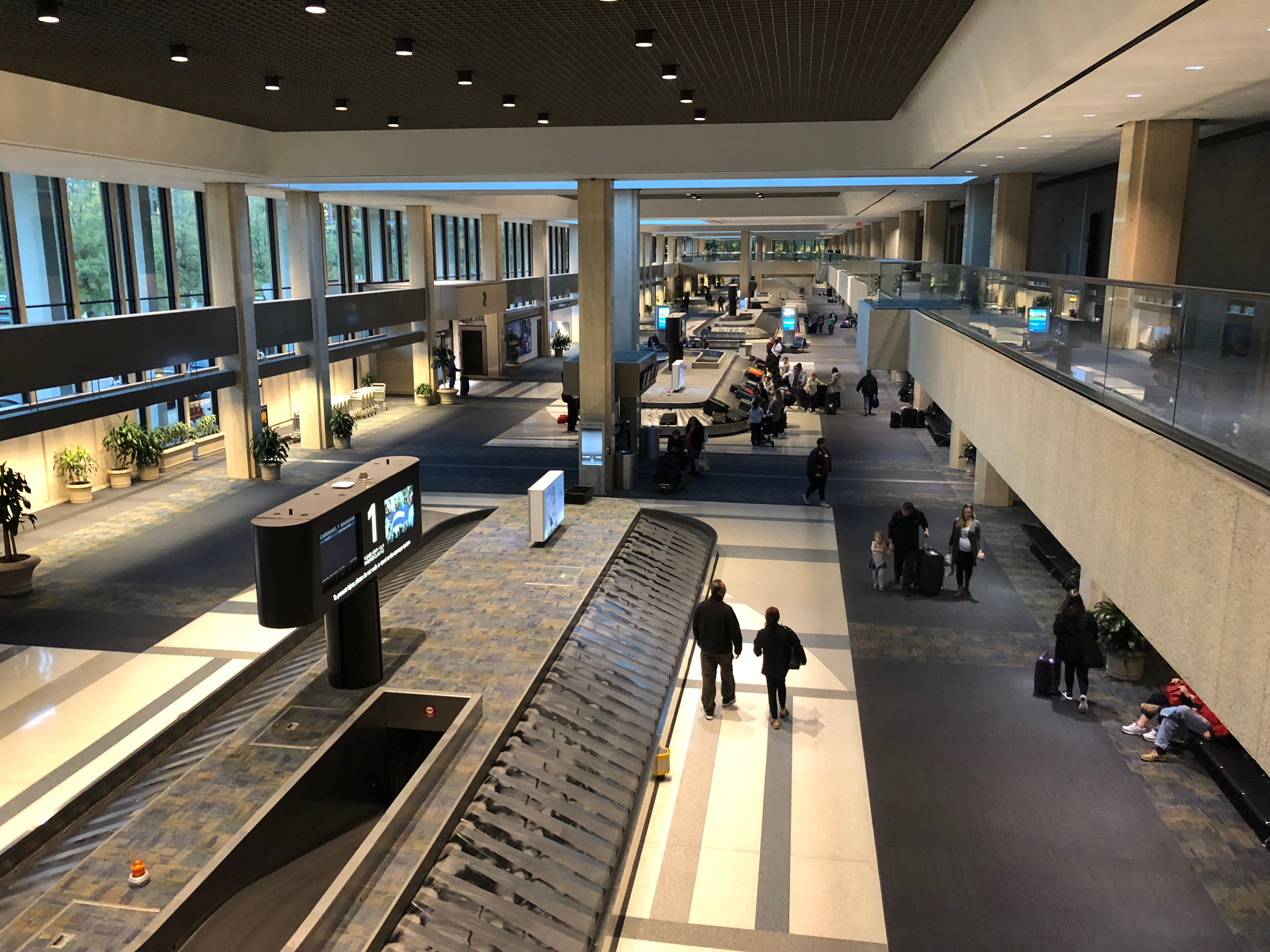
Baggage claim area

General aviation services, or fixed-base operations, are provided by Signature Flight Support with full-service facilities for maintaining and housing private and corporate aircraft. The modern 54,000-square-foot (5,000 m^{2}) terminal facility offers everything from aircraft rental to sightseeing flights and aircraft repair.

=== FAA control tower ===
Built in 1995, the FAA Norfolk Air Traffic Control Tower stands 134 feet (41 m) high. Operated and managed by the Federal Aviation Administration, the Norfolk Tower handles about 1,100 aircraft per day, 24 hours per day and 365 days per year. Radar coverage is provided by the ASR-9 terminal system with a six-level weather detection capability. Also available for use is an Enhanced Target Generator (ETG) lab with two radar scopes to accomplish training objectives, as well as the IDS4 system, a specialized microcomputer network system designed to distribute and display both static and real-time data regarding weather and other rapidly changing critical information to air traffic controllers.

=== Concourses ===
Norfolk International Airport has two passenger concourses:

Concourse A (gates 1-9) are used by American Airlines, Breeze Airways, and Southwest Airlines, while Concourse B (gates 16-30) are used by Delta Air Lines, Frontier Airlines, Spirit Airlines and United Airlines. International Flights are operated out of Gate A1, with only Breeze Airways operating flights from Cancun International Airport.

=== Cargo ===
About 70 million pounds of air cargo are shipped in and out of Norfolk International Airport each year. NIA houses one of the most modern and efficient air cargo facilities in the state. Its two modern air cargo terminals have 88,000 square feet (8,200 m^{2}) of space. A ramp provides direct access from the plane to the warehouse.

=== Terminal upgrade ===
Major upgrades on the main terminal began in 2024 and are scheduled to be finished by early 2026. The moving walkway on the Sky Bridge between Arrivals and Departures was reinstalled, a new Customs and Border Patrol facility is being constructed, the checking bags area will be consolidated, a new expansion for Concourse A with additional departures, and a Courtyard by Marriott hotel will be built on the airport's grounds, which has already been approved. Two new destinations were also announced, with both Breeze Airways and Spirit Airlines flying to Southwest Florida International Airport, and Spirit Airlines flying to Tampa International Airport. In 2025, multiple other improvement projects will begin, including a new Departures Terminal with a modern glass facade and a unified ticketing area and baggage deposit, a rental car facility, more meal options, and updated lounges. There is expected to be $2 cost increase in fares and other expenses to cover this extensive renovation, with the end goal being to make Norfolk International Airport a Skytrax 5-star rated airport.

=== Closure of Runway 14/32 ===
On August 25, 2025, it was announced that Norfolk International Airport would be closing the crosswind Runway 14/32, effective immediately. 14/32 had been built in 1943 by the U.S. Government to support World War II and ran perpendicular to the main runway, however, by the 2020s, it's 4875-foot length was too short to accommodate most aircraft types operational at ORF. According to ORF's Vice President of Capital Projects, Jeff Bass, the runway only carried approximately 1% of annual operations. Closing the runway will make room for additional improvements in the airport's capital projects, these include a new de-icing facility and the expansion of cargo operations. The closure of 14/32 will also allow for the straightening of Robin Hood Road, one of the main entrances to the airport, anticipating future increases in vehicle traffic. It will also reduce airspace conflicts with NAS Oceana.

== Airlines and destinations ==
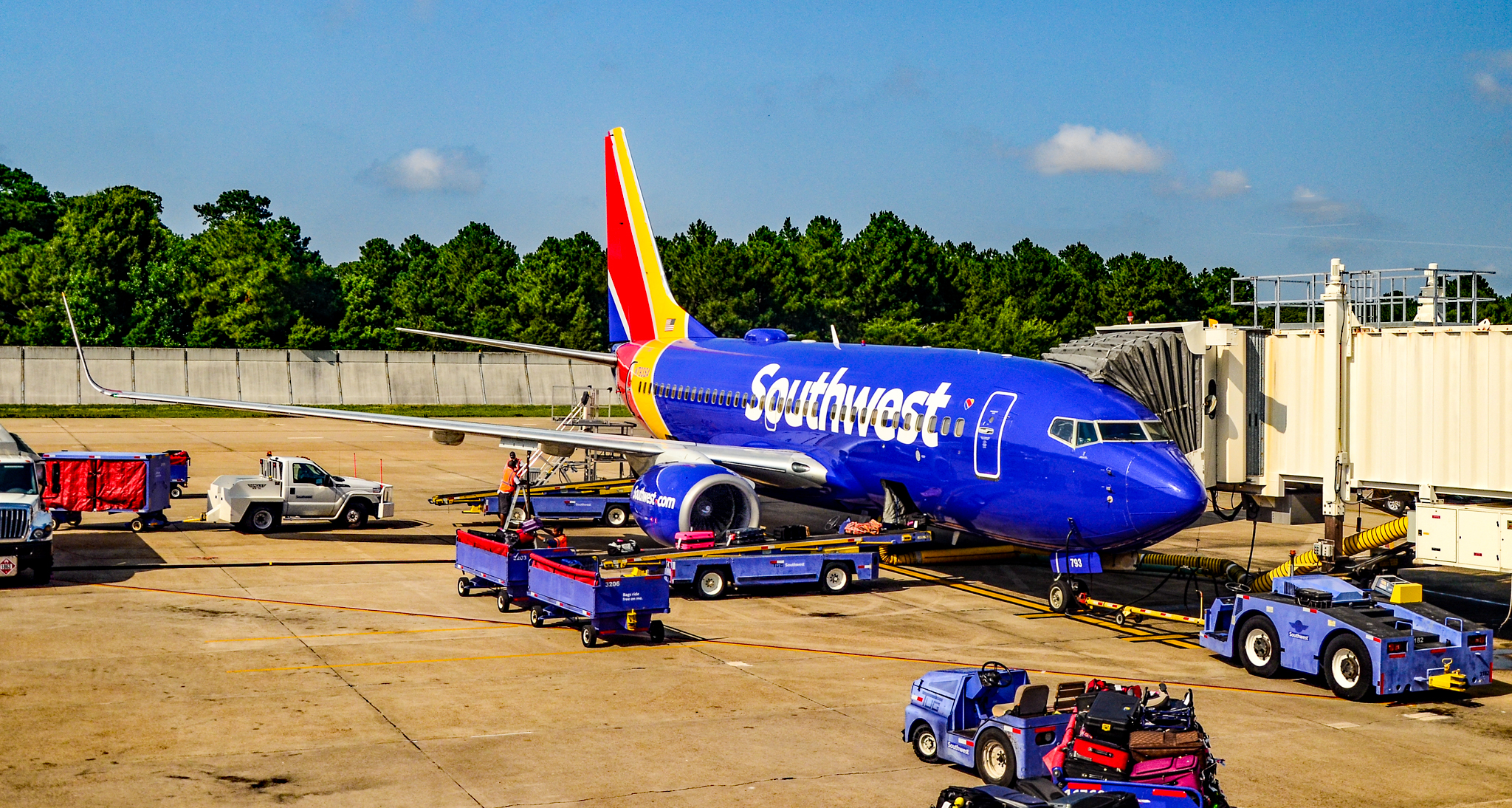
A Southwest Airlines Boeing 737-700 parked at a gate in the airport's Concourse A

=== Passenger ===
Airlines	Destinations
Alaska Airlines	Seattle/Tacoma (begins June 10, 2027)
American Airlines	Charlotte, Dallas/Fort Worth, Miami
American Eagle	Charlotte, Chicago–O'Hare, New York–JFK, New York–LaGuardia, Philadelphia, Washington–National; Seasonal: Miami
Breeze Airways	Charleston (SC), Hartford, Jacksonville (FL), Las Vegas, Long Island/Islip, New Haven, New Orleans, Orlando, Providence, Tampa, West Palm Beach; Seasonal: Akron/Canton, Cancún, Columbus–Glenn, Fort Myers, Los Angeles, Phoenix–Sky Harbor, Pittsburgh, Portland (ME), San Diego
Delta Air Lines	Atlanta; Seasonal: Detroit
Delta Connection	Boston, Detroit, Minneapolis/St. Paul, New York–JFK, New York–LaGuardia
Frontier Airlines	Atlanta, Orlando
JetBlue	Fort Lauderdale, San Juan; Seasonal: Boston
Southwest Airlines	Baltimore, Chicago–Midway, Dallas–Love, Nashville, Orlando; Seasonal: Denver, Kansas City, St. Louis
United Airlines	Chicago–O'Hare, Denver, Houston–Intercontinental, San Francisco (begins March 31, 2027), Washington–Dulles
United Express	Chicago–O'Hare, Newark, Washington–Dulles

=== Cargo ===
Airlines	Destinations
FedEx Express	Memphis
FedEx Feeder operated by Mountain Air Cargo	Manteo

== Statistics ==
=== Airline market share ===
Top airlines serving ORF (May 2025 – April 2026)
Rank	Airline	Passenger	Market share
1	Delta Air Lines	909,000	18.30%
3	American Airlines	759,000	15.28%
3	Southwest Airlines	754,000	15.19%
4	Breeze Airways	497,000	10.01%
5	Republic Airways	372,000	7.50%
	Other	1,674,000	33.72%

=== Top destinations ===
Busiest domestic routes from ORF (May 2025 – April 2026)
Rank	City	Passengers	Carriers
1	Atlanta, Georgia	442,780	Delta, Frontier
2	Charlotte, North Carolina	252,660	American
3	Baltimore, Maryland	163,460	Southwest
4	Dallas/Fort Worth, Texas	145,110	American, Frontier
5	Chicago–O'Hare, Illinois	141,240	American, United
6	Orlando, Florida	116,080	Breeze, Frontier, Southwest
7	New York–LaGuardia, New York	101,960	American, Delta
8	Washington–Dulles, Virginia	89,440	United
9	Denver, Colorado	89,420	Southwest, United
10	New York–JFK, New York	89,140	American, Delta

=== Annual traffic ===
Annual passenger traffic (enplaned/deplaned) at ORF 2002 through present
Year	Passengers	Year	Passengers	Year	Passengers
2002	3,464,246	2012	3,299,712	2022	4,115,537
2003	3,436,391	2013	3,112,355	2023	4,552,582
2004	3,778,216	2014	2,965,306	2024	4,864,752
2005	3,884,422	2015	3,034,407	2025	4,892,594
2006	3,703,664	2016	3,209,185		
2007	3,714,323	2017	3,380,902		
2008	3,549,204	2018	3,663,996		
2009	3,409,456	2019	3,981,139		
2010	3,332,466	2020	1,785,135		
2011	3,193,388	2021	3,311,121		

== Ground transportation ==
There are no bus or shuttle services to and from Norfolk International Airport. The nearest bus (HRT Route 15) connection is 1.5 miles (2.4 km) away at the intersection of Military Highway (Route 165) and Norview Avenue (Route 247).

All ground transportation services are located in the arrivals terminal. There are several on-site rental car companies, an authorized shuttle service providing door-to-door service to the entire Hampton Roads area, and taxis available through several companies. Both Uber and Lyft service the airport through an agreement with the airport authority.

=== Parking ===
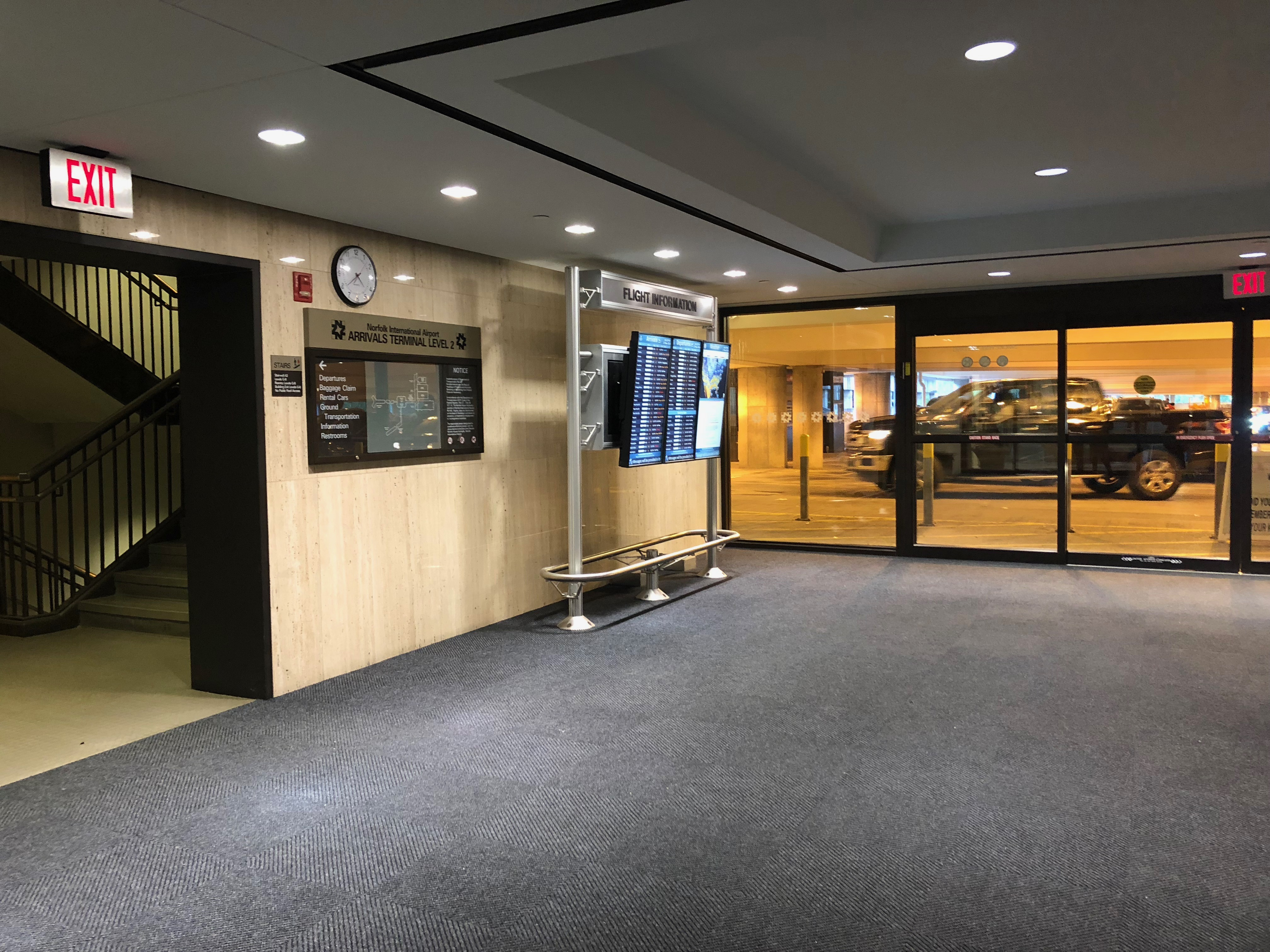
The main entrance to the parking garage at ORF

A nine-level parking garage adjacent to the new arrivals terminal opened in July 2002. It provides 2,800 covered spaces for short-term, long-term, and rental parking. Overall, NIA parking facilities can accommodate 7,000 vehicles. In February 2019, the airport announced it would begin construction of a brand new 1.09 million square foot parking garage. Construction started in July 2019. This new parking garage will consolidate all parking lots at ORF. It will also replace the employee shuttle that costs over $600,000 a year to operate.

== Accidents and incidents ==
- On January 19, 1967, a United Airlines Vickers 754D Viscount collided with a snow plow that had entered the runway in the path of the United plane upon landing. All 50 passengers and crew on board the aircraft survived; the aircraft suffered major damage to its airframe and was written off.
- On September 1, 1974, a Martin 4-0-4 which was sitting empty on the ramp caught fire, damaging the airframe beyond repair. The cause of the fire was never determined.

== See also ==
- Virginia World War II Army Airfields
- List of airports in Virginia
