= Florida Keys Marathon Airport =

Florida Keys Marathon International Airport
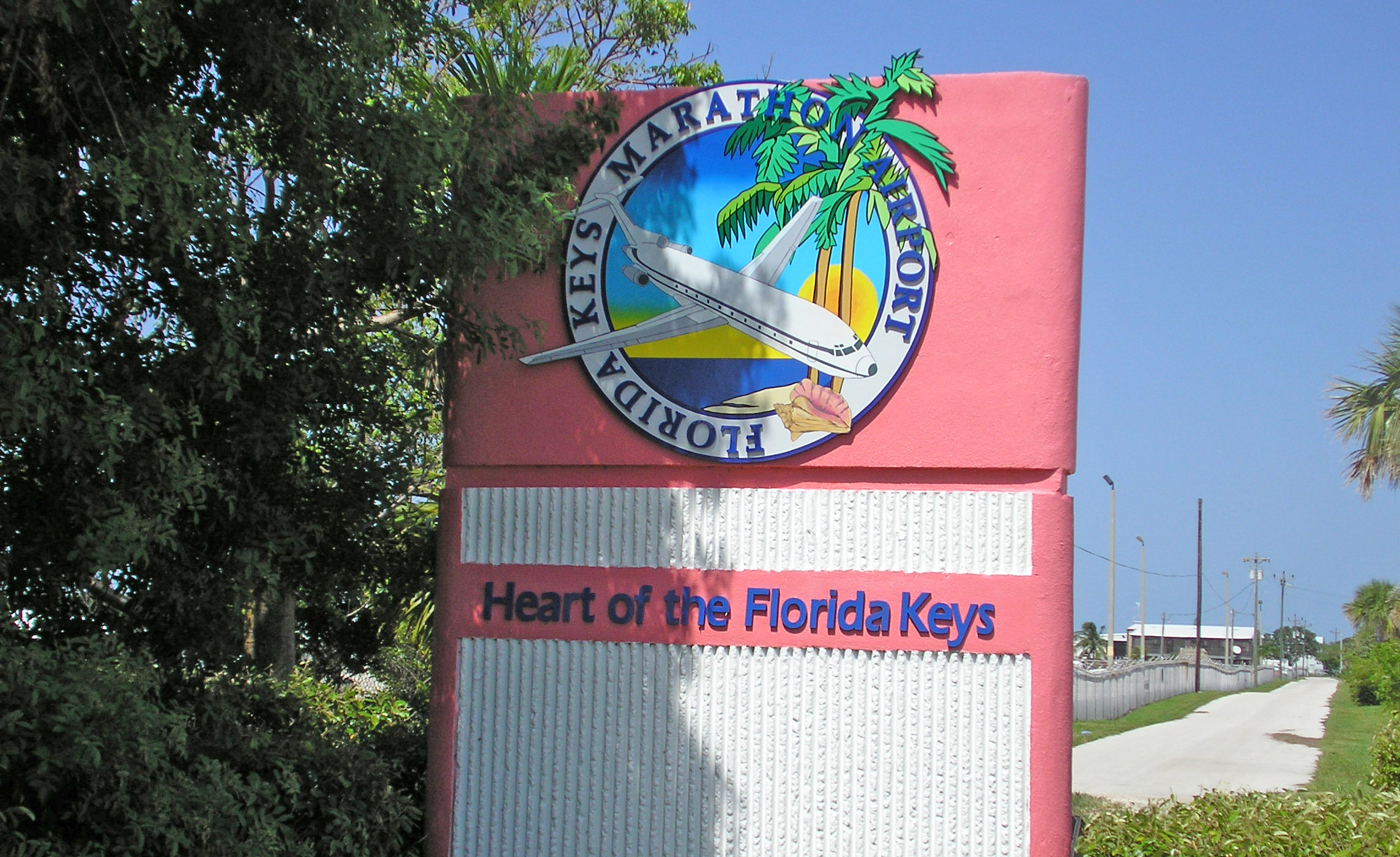
- IATA: MTH; ICAO: KMTH; FAA LID: MTH

Summary
- Airport type: Public
- Owner: Monroe County
- Location: Marathon, Florida
- Hub for: Duck key Charters
- Elevation AMSL: 5 ft (1.5 m)
- Coordinates: 24°43′34″N 81°03′05″W
- Interactive map of Florida Keys Marathon International Airport

Runways
Direction	Length		Surface
Direction	ft	m	Surface
7/25	5,008	1,526	Asphalt

The Florida Keys Marathon International Airport (IATA: MTH, ICAO: KMTH, FAA LID: MTH) is a public airport located along the Overseas Highway (US1) in Marathon, in Monroe County, Florida, United States. The airport covers 197 acres (80 ha) and has one runway.

== History ==
The 8000-foot airstrip in Marathon was built on 280 acres of land that was purchased at $70 an acre from Maitland Adams and Norberg Thompson of Key West. Belcher Oil Company was the prime contractor and constructed the airport for the Civil Aeronautics Administration. The project was started in the fall of 1942 and it was completed in the spring of 1943. The Marathon Airport was constructed during the early days of WWII and was a portion of the U.S. Navy flight programs. Marathon would become a Navy Outlying Field (OLF) and an auxiliary airfield to Naval Air Station Key West (NAS). Used by Army Air Forces Antisubmarine Command, 26th Antisubmarine Wing. The Army Air Forces turned responsibility for antisubmarine warfare over to the U.S. Navy in 1943. For a time at the beginning of the war, the airstrip property was partly owned by the Florida State Road Department. After the war, Monroe County petitioned this agency to turn it over to the county for a public airport. For most of its existence, the airport has been a general aviation facility although it did have scheduled passenger airline service for over 25 years including regional jet service for a short time in 2007. Regional 44-passenger seat Convair 340 propeller service began in 1959 with National Airlines (1934–1980) serving Marathon on a flag stop basis as part of their Miami - Key West route and these flights marked the first time the airport was directly served by a major U.S. airline.

During the late 1960s and early 1970s, commuter air carrier American Air Taxi (AAT Airlines) ran a limited passenger service into Marathon with small Cessna twin prop aircraft. Also during the late 1960s, Southeast Airlines was serving the airport with three flights daily to and from Miami as part of a Miami - Marathon - Key West route utilizing two Martin 4-0-4 prop aircraft and a Fairchild F-27 turboprop. After the demise of this service, Air Sunshine, an airline founded in Key West, served Marathon with Douglas DC-3 aircraft to and from Miami. For a time during the 1970s and early 1980s, Air Florida Commuter provided service to Marathon and Key West via a code sharing agreement with Air Florida, followed by Provincetown-Boston Airlines (PBA) which primarily used a combination of DC-3 prop and smaller Embraer EMB-110 Bandeirante commuter turboprop aircraft as well as larger 58-passenger seat NAMC YS-11 turboprops on occasion. Other commuter airlines that served Marathon at various times over the years with prop and/or turboprop aircraft included Air Miami and successor North American Airlines, Air South, Airways International, Bar Harbor Airlines operating code sharing service as Eastern Express on behalf of Eastern Airlines, Cape Air, Comair flying code sharing service as the Delta Connection on behalf of Delta Air Lines, Gulfstream International, Pro Air, Shawnee Airlines and Southern Express.

Marathon Airport was served by American Eagle Airlines operating code sharing flights with turboprop aircraft on behalf of American Airlines until 2000. In mid-2006, Delta Air Lines announced planned nonstop regional jet service between Atlanta and Marathon to flown by its regional subsidiary Atlantic Southeast Airlines (ASA) on a code sharing basis. Shortly after the Delta announcement, Continental Airlines announced that it would begin services to Marathon via its Florida code sharing partner Gulfstream International. In July 2006, the Transportation Security Administration (TSA) notified airport officials at Marathon Airport that due to a shortage of personnel, the TSA would not be able to staff Marathon Airport with federal security screeners; passengers would have to board and disembark airline aircraft at the general aviation ramp area located on the opposite end of the runway instead of at the airport's passenger terminal. Both Continental and Delta then stated that using this area would be inconvenient to both passengers and airline staff, as it would cause lengthy delays in boarding due to all passengers having to be screened as they enter the aircraft rather than before reaching the gate. Connecting passengers would also have to be rescreened at the intermediate destination before boarding their connecting aircraft, causing further inconveniences in passenger connections. Both airlines also stated that if the airport could not resolve the TSA issue before their announced service start dates, they would withdraw their previously announced scheduled service offers.

However, on December 1, 2006, the TSA bowed to the effective lobbying efforts of local government, congressional and business officials when it announced that screeners would be provided at the airport no later than February 15, 2007, even if it meant using a contractor Official Florida Keys Tourism Council News. As a result of the TSA decision, ASA began daily scheduled nonstop flights on behalf of Delta on February 15, 2007 between Atlanta and Marathon which marked the first time the airport had scheduled jet service. In late spring of 2007, Delta ended the regional jet service operated by ASA and instead began regional jet flights operated on a code sharing basis by Freedom Airlines nonstop between Atlanta and Marathon. The reason given for this switch was due to Marathon's published runway length being 5,000 feet (1,500 m) and that Freedom Airlines' Embraer ERJ-145 regional jet aircraft had better short field performance when compared with the Canadair regional jet aircraft operated by ASA . When ASA was serving the airport it used specially configured 40-passenger seat Canadair CRJ-100 regional jets because the performance and takeoff weight of the standard 50-seat CRJ versions would exceed safety margins, given Marathon's comparatively short runway length.

In mid-summer of 2007, Delta announced it would end service to Marathon Airport due to low demand.

On October 4, 2008, Continental Airlines announced it would begin commercial service to Marathon Airport via a Cape Air codeshare to Southwest Florida International Airport in Fort Myers, with TSA security clearance to occur once on the ground in Fort Myers, if connecting to another flight. Service began on December 19, 2008, but ended the following year.

Also in 2008, Marathon Airport was featured in Army of Two, an action video game by EA Montreal.

On April 20, 2016, for the first time in approximately three decades, U.S. Customs and Immigration service became available at the Florida Keys Marathon International Airport. The inauguration of a new 4,200-sq-ft permanent Customs and Border Protection facility located in the former commercial terminal. Located midfield on Taxiway Alpha, U.S. Customs is regularly available from 9 a.m. to 5:30 p.m. Wednesday though Sunday, with after-hours callout service available with 24 hours' notice. The cost for the $1.6 million facility was split equally between the Florida Department of Transportation and the Monroe County Airport Authority.

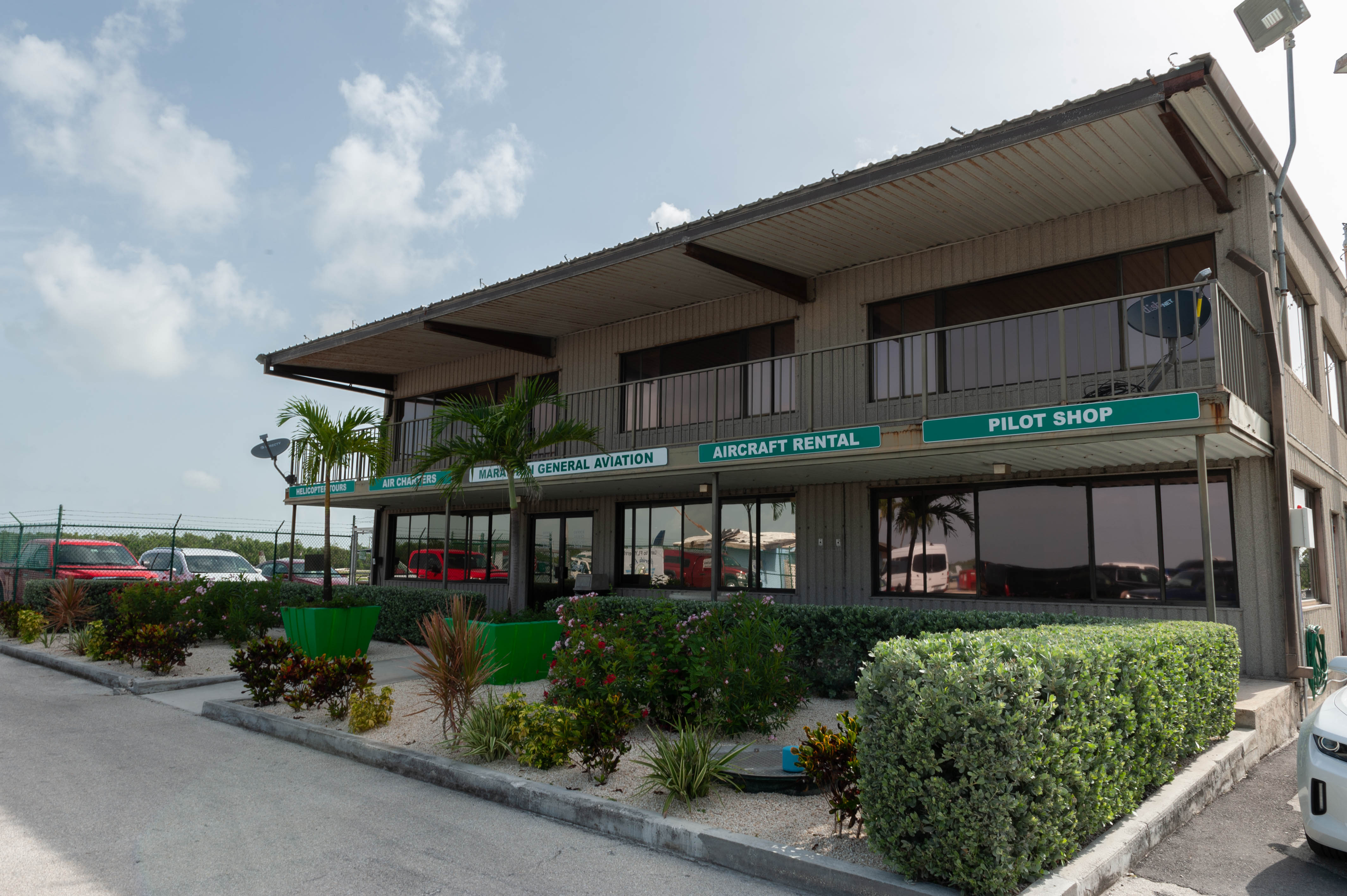
Marathon FBO in 2018

== Airlines and destinations ==
=== Passenger ===
As of 2026, the airport has charter operations but no scheduled passenger airline service. However, airport officials are in talks with multiple airlines to restart regular commercial service.

=== Cargo ===
Airlines	Destinations
FedEx Feeder	Fort Lauderdale

=== Charter flights and management ===
- Air Key West
- Duck Key Charters
- Monarch Air Group

Aircraft Maintenance

Antique Air

=== Historical airline service to Miami: 1975 to 1999 ===
According to the Official Airline Guide (OAG), the following airlines operated scheduled passenger service nonstop to Miami International Airport (MIA) at various times from 1975 to 1999 utilizing prop and/or turboprop regional and commuter aircraft:

April 1975

- Air Sunshine operating Douglas DC-3 aircraft with one daily flight
- Southeast Airlines operating Martin 4-0-4 aircraft with one daily flight

November 1979

- Air Florida Commuter operating de Havilland Canada DHC-6 Twin Otter aircraft with up to three flights a day (code sharing service operated on behalf of Air Florida)

April 1981

- Air Florida Commuter operating de Havilland Canada DHC-6 Twin Otter and CASA 212 aircraft with four daily flights (code sharing service operated on behalf of Air Florida)
- Provincetown-Boston Airlines (PBA) operating Douglas DC-3 and Embraer EMB-110 Bandeirante aircraft with six daily flights

February 1985

- Provincetown-Boston Airlines (PBA) operating Douglas DC-3 and Embraer EMB-110 Bandeirante aircraft with six daily flights
- Southern Express operating Piper Navajo aircraft with up to five flights a day

December 1989

- Airways International operating Cessna 402 aircraft with four daily flights
- American Eagle Airlines operating British Aerospace BAe Jetstream 31 aircraft with five daily flights (code sharing service operated on behalf of American Airlines)
- Eastern Express service flown by Bar Harbor Airlines operating Beechcraft 99 aircraft with up to six flights a day (code sharing service operated on behalf of Eastern Airlines)

April 1995

- American Eagle Airlines operating Short 360 aircraft with five daily flights (code sharing service operated on behalf of American Airlines)
- Gulfstream International operating Beechcraft 99 and Cessna 402 aircraft with up to four flights a day

June 1999

- American Eagle Airlines operating Saab 340 aircraft with one daily flight (code sharing service operated on behalf of American Airlines)

Besides service to Miami, the airport also had nonstop flights to other destinations in Florida during the late 1980s including Fort Lauderdale and Orlando. In December 1989, the OAG listed three daily flights to Fort Lauderdale operated by Comair flying code sharing service as the Delta Connection with Embraer EMB-110 Bandeirante aircraft on behalf of Delta Air Lines as well as up to six flights a day also to Fort Lauderdale operated by Air Sunshine with Cessna 402 aircraft. In addition, Comair flying as the Delta Connection was operating one nonstop Embraer EMB-110 flight on weekdays to Orlando at this same time. However, these flights to Fort Lauderdale and Orlando proved to be short-lived as subsequent OAG editions do not list any nonstop service between Marathon and these cities.

By 1995, USAir Express was operating nonstop flights between the airport and Tampa twice daily with Beechcraft 1900C commuter turboprops on a code sharing basis on behalf of USAir.

== See also ==
- List of airports in Florida

== Sources ==
- Shaw, Frederick J. (2004), Locating Air Force Base Sites History’s Legacy, Air Force History and Museums Program, United States Air Force, Washington DC, 2004.
- Airport Master Record (FAA Form 5010), also available as a printable form (PDF)
- Florida Keys Marathon Airport (page at Monroe County tourism site)
