= List of Beechcraft Model 99 operators =

In July 2018, 105 Beechcraft Model 99s were in airline service, all in the Americas:

- 55: Ameriflight
- 12: Alpine Air
- 10: Bemidji Airlines
- 10: Freight Runners Express
- 9: Wiggins Airways
- 2: Flamingo Air, Hummingbird Air, InterCaribbean Airways
- 1: Bar XH Air, Courtesy Air, North Wright Airways and Sky High Aviation Services

== Former airline operators in the U.S. and Canada ==
A considerable number of commuter and regional airlines in the U.S. and Canada previously operated the Beechcraft Model 99 in scheduled passenger service. The following list of air carriers is taken from Official Airline Guide (OAG) flight schedules from 1974 to 1995:

- Air Canada Connector (operated by Austin Airways) - Canada
- Air East
- Air Kentucky
- Air Mikisew - Canada
- Air New Orleans
- Air North - Canada
- Air Schefferville - Canada
- Air South
- Air Tindi - Canada
- Air Vegas
- Air Wisconsin
- Aklak Air - Canada
- Allegheny Commuter
- Altair Airlines
- American Eagle (operated by Wings West Airlines)
- Austin Airways - Canada
- Bar Harbor Airlines
- Bearskin Airlines - Canada
- Britt Airways
- Business Express
- Canadian Airlines Partner (operated by Pacific Coastal Airlines) - Canada
- Cascade Airways
- Chaparral Airlines
- Chautauqua Airlines - operating as Allegheny Commuter and later as USAir Express
- Coastal Airlines
- Colgan Air
- Command Airways
- Commuter Airlines
- Desert Sun Airlines
- Eastern Express
- East Hampton Aire
- Executive Airlines - commuter air carrier in Florida and the northeast U.S.
- Frontier Airlines (1950-1986)
- GP Express Airlines
- Golden Pacific Airlines
- Gopher Airlines
- Great Lakes Airlines
- Gulfstream International Airlines
- Henson Airlines
- Kenn Borek Air - Canada
- Lone Star Airlines
- Mackey International Airlines
- Mall Airways
- Marco Island Airways
- Mesa Airlines
- Mesaba Airlines
- Metro Airlines
- Midstate Airlines
- Midwest Commuter Airways
- Mississippi Valley Airlines (MVA)
- Mohawk Airlines (late 1980s commuter air carrier)
- Monmouth Airlines
- New York Air Connection
- Northeast Express Regional Airlines
- Northwest Airlink
- Northwestern Air - Canada
- North-Wright Airways - Canada
- Ocean Airways
- Orca Airways
- Piedmont Airlines (1948-1989) - Regional Airlines division
- Pacific Coastal Airlines - Canada
- Pilgrim Airlines
- Pioneer Airlines (1980s commuter air carrier)
- Precision Airlines
- Rio Airways
- Royale Airlines
- San Juan Airlines
- Skystream Airlines
- Skyway Commuter
- Skyway of Ocala - operated as Air Florida Commuter
- Southern Frontier Airlines - Canada
- Skyways (formerly Scheduled Skyways)
- Sunbird Airlines
- Texas International Airlines
- Transnorthern Airlines
- Transwestern Airlines
- Westpac Airlines
- Wings West Airlines
- Wright Airlines
- Pacific Southwest Airlines

== European operators ==
- DLT

== Former military operators ==
Chile

- Chilean Air Force, eight 99As delivered in 1971.

Peru
Thailand

- Royal Thai Army, one C99 delivered in 1969.

Other small commuter airlines in the U.S. and Canada operated the Beechcraft Model 99 as well. The aircraft has also been used in air cargo feeder operations transporting freight.

In addition, Texas International Airlines, which operated Douglas DC-9-10 and McDonnell Douglas DC-9-30 jetliners as well as Convair 600 turboprops, also flew several Beechcraft 99A aircraft during the early 1970s.
