= Flight 400 =

Flight 400 may refer to:

- TWA Flight 400, crashed on 1 April 1956
- Spantax Flight 400, crashed on 5 March 1973
