= Marathon Airport =

Marathon Airport may refer to:

- Marathon Aerodrome, in Marathon, Ontario, Canada
- Florida Keys Marathon Airport, in Marathon, Florida, United States
