= Southwest Florida International Airport =

Airport serving Fort Myers, Florida, United States

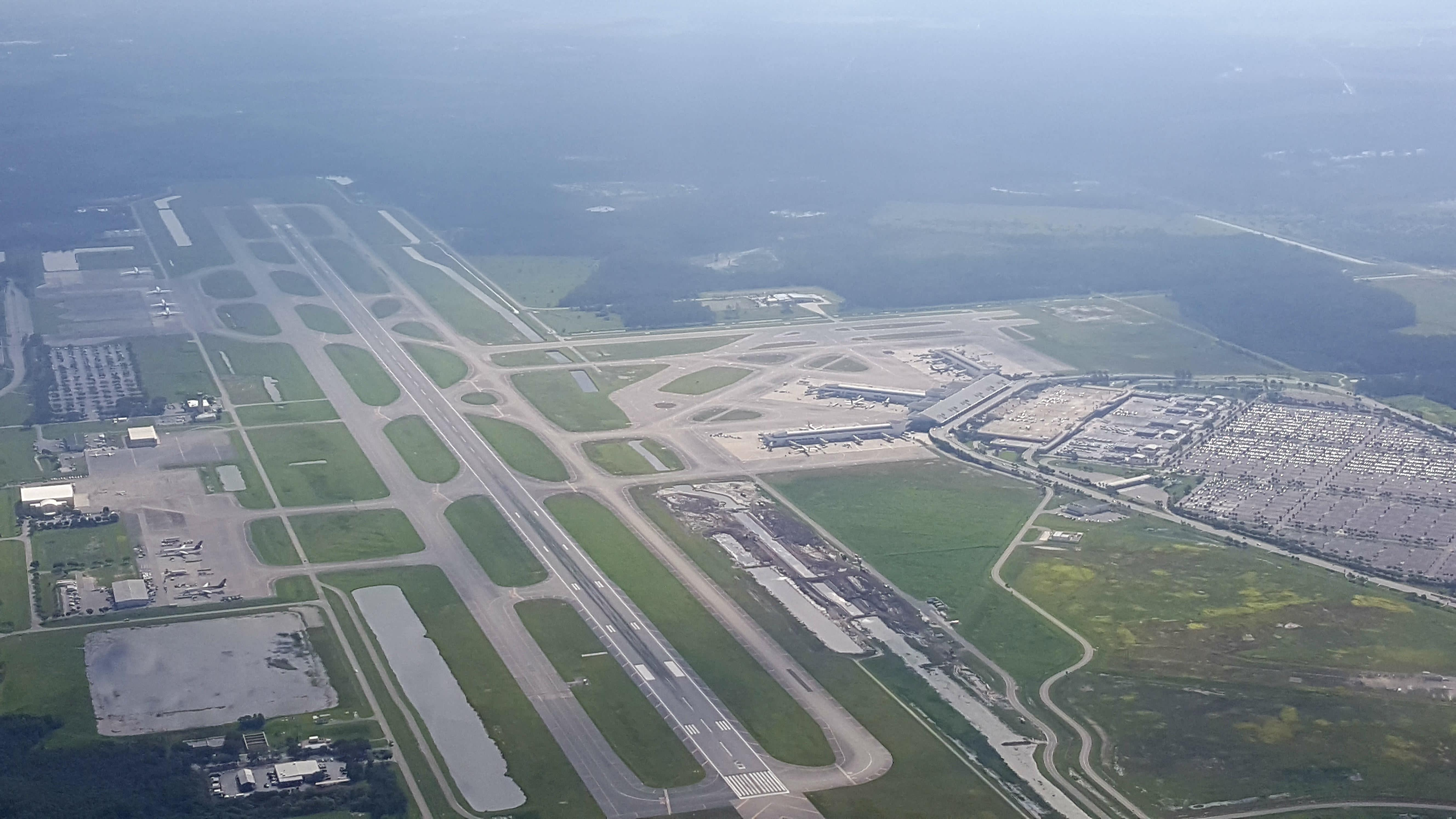
- IATA: RSW; ICAO: KRSW; FAA LID: RSW

Summary
- Airport type: Public
- Owner/Operator: Lee County Port Authority
- Serves: Fort Myers; Southwest Florida
- Location: Unincorporated Lee County, adjacent to Fort Myers
- Opened: May 14, 1983; 43 years ago
- Operating base for: Breeze Airways
- Elevation AMSL: 30 ft (9.1 m)
- Coordinates: 26°32′10″N 081°45′19″W
- Website: flylcpa.com

Maps
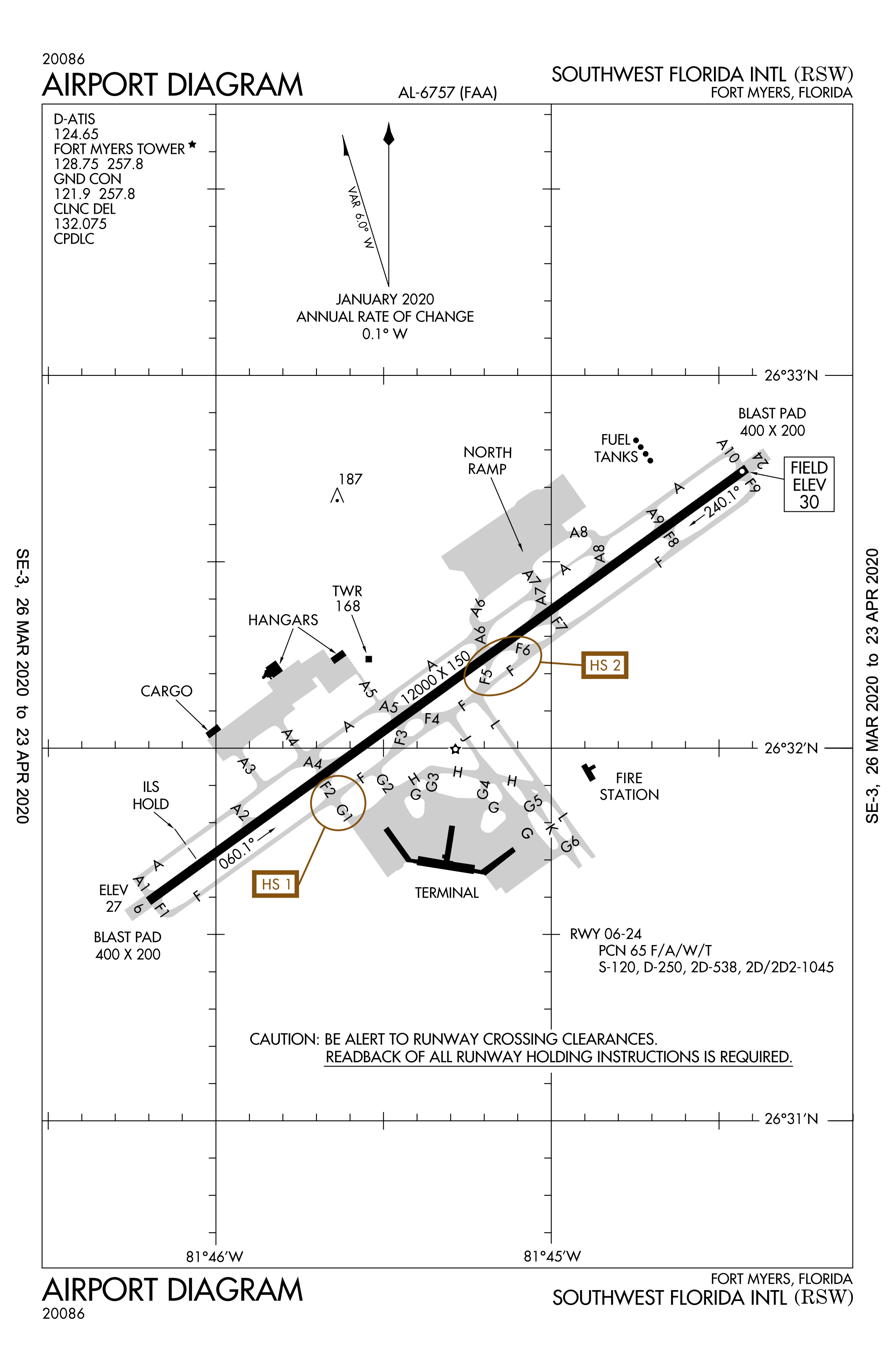
- FAA airport diagram
- Interactive map of Southwest Florida International Airport

Runways
Direction	Length		Surface
Direction	ft	m	Surface
06/24	12,000	3,658	Asphalt

Statistics (2025)
- Aircraft operations: 99,958
- Passengers: 11,154,458 ▲1.1%
- Total cargo (lbs): 37,499,294

Southwest Florida International Airport (IATA: RSW, ICAO: KRSW, FAA LID: RSW) is a major county-owned airport in the South Fort Myers area of unincorporated Lee County, Florida, United States. The airport serves the Southwest Florida region, including the Cape Coral-Fort Myers, Naples-Marco Island, and Punta Gorda metropolitan areas, and is a U.S. Customs and Border Protection port of entry. It currently is the second-busiest single-runway airport in the United States, after San Diego International Airport, California. In 2025, the airport served 11,154,458 passengers, the most in its history.

The airport sits on 13,555 acres (5,486 ha, 21.2 sq.mi.) of land just southeast of Fort Myers, about 6,000 acres of which have been conserved as swamp lands and set aside for environmental mitigation.

== History ==
=== Planning and construction ===
Prior to the opening of the airport, the Southwest Florida region was served by Page Field in Fort Myers. By the 1970s, however, Page Field clearly had become too small to handle increasing future demand for commercial flights into the region. Expanding Page Field was determined to be impractical because its airfield was constrained by U.S. 41 to the west and expanding the airfield to the east would require bridging the Ten Mile Canal and relocating a railroad track.

A number of sites were considered for a new regional airport, including southern Charlotte County, Estero, and northeast Cape Coral near Burnt Store Marina. The government of Lee County ultimately selected a site near the end of Daniels Parkway that was a dirt road at the time. An advantage to this location was its proximity to Interstate 75, which was under construction and would have an interchange with Daniels Parkway, providing easy access (Interstate 75 was opened to traffic through Fort Myers in 1979).

Construction of Southwest Florida airport began in 1980, and the airport opened on schedule on May 14, 1983. Upon opening, the airport was named Southwest Florida Regional Airport (the airport code RSW is short for "Regional South-West"). Originally, the airport included a single 8400-ft runway and a passenger terminal with 14 gates on two concourses. The original passenger terminal was located on the north side of the runway at the end of Chamberlin Parkway.

=== Opening and early years ===
When the airport opened in 1983, Southwest Florida Regional Airport was served by Air Florida Commuter (operated by Finair Express), Continental Airlines, Delta Air Lines, Eastern Air Lines, Northwest Orient Airlines, Ozark Air Lines, Pan Am, Republic Airlines, and United Airlines. Delta Air Lines operated the first flight. By 1985, American Airlines, People Express, Provincetown-Boston Airlines, Southern Express, and USAir were also serving the airport.

In 1986, American Trans Air (later known as ATA) began service to Fort Myers with flights to Indianapolis International Airport, which was the first scheduled service for that airline.

The airport received its first international flight in February 1984 with a direct flight from Toronto operated by Wardair Canada. With increasing demand for international service, a small U.S. Customs facility was built within the original terminal on the lower level of Concourse B.

The airport was renamed Southwest Florida International Airport on May 14, 1993, which was its 10th anniversary. The name change coincided with an expansion of the terminal, which included a 55,000-square-foot Federal Inspection facility to replace the first facility. The larger facility opened in 1994 and was connected to the original terminal's Concourse A. The runway was also lengthened to 12,000 ft (3,658 m) at the same time to better accommodate international service (making it the fourth-longest runway in Florida).

In 1988, the airport exceeded its annual capacity of 3 million passengers; by 2004, the airport was serving nearly 7 million passengers annually. In 1998, the original terminal was expanded with a new wing added to Concourse B that included three additional gates, bringing the total to 17.

In April 1994, LTU International introduced a Munich–Düsseldorf–Fort Myers–Miami–Düsseldorf–Munich route. This was Fort Myers' first flight to Europe. It came in response to rising tourism from Germany, which Lee County had spent the past several years cultivating. The county considered Germany a natural market to target, given the sizable German-American community that lived in Southwest Florida and maintained ties with its country of origin.

=== Midfield terminal ===
With the original terminal operating at more than double its intended capacity, construction of the current midfield terminal began in February 2002. The $438 million terminal opened on September 9, 2005. The terminal has three concourses and 28 gates. Demolition of the original terminal north of the airfield was completed in spring 2006. The original terminal's parking lot still stands at the end of Chamberlin Parkway. The former terminal's ramp, now known as North Ramp, is now primarily used as a base for Western Global Airlines, an Estero-based cargo airline.

=== Recent history ===
In early 2015, Terminal Access Road, the airport's main entrance road, was extended past Treeline Avenue to connect directly to Interstate 75, allowing airport-related traffic to avoid local streets. The airport can now be accessed directly from the freeway at Exit 128. Terminal Access Road was then expanded to six lanes in late 2016.

Air Berlin, which had bought LTU, ceased service to Düsseldorf in October 2017. The following May, Eurowings began routes to Düsseldorf, Munich, and Cologne using Airbus A330s. The carrier subsequently dropped the flights to Munich and Cologne. Due to the COVID-19 pandemic, the company suspended its link to Düsseldorf in March 2020. Eurowings Discover launched a route to Frankfurt in March 2022.

== Current and future projects ==
A new $16 million airport rescue and firefighting facility (Lee County Station 92) opened in July 2013. A 9,100 ft (2,800 m) parallel runway is under development. The project includes a relocated air traffic control tower, apron expansion, crossfield taxiway system, mitigation activities and FPL electrical line relocation. The new air traffic control tower was expected to be completed by 2019, but construction delays until December 2021 moved the opening to January 2022. The parallel runway was delayed indefinitely. The apron expansion and crossfield taxiway system were completed in late 2013. The entire project was estimated to cost $454 million.

In early 2018, the Lee County Port Authority (LCPA) announced plans to ease seasonal security wait times by consolidating the three individual concourse checkpoints to a single consolidated checkpoint for all concourses. By relocating the checkpoints, more restaurants, shops, and post-security spaces would be available. According to the announcement by the LCPA, this expansion could cost $150–180 million. Construction of this expansion is currently underway. The airport is also planning to build another concourse (Concourse E) on the west side of the terminal by 2027.

Plans are in place for Skyplex, a commercial and industrial park, in the location of the former passenger terminal. Chamberlin Parkway is currently being realigned, which will remove the roadway loop that once served the former terminal. Other airport-related businesses, such as a hotel, are in the planning stages. A retail gasoline outlet near the airport's entrance opened in June 2014.

Southwest Florida International Airport is undergoing a multiphase terminal expansion program (reported at about US$1.1 billion) that began in October 2021; the initial phase consolidates security screening into a single, enlarged checkpoint, remodels roughly 164,000 square feet, and adds about 117,000 square feet of new circulation and concession space, upgrades and expands passenger amenities, and installs infrastructure to support a planned future Concourse E with additional gates, with overall construction scheduled for completion in 2027.

== Facilities ==
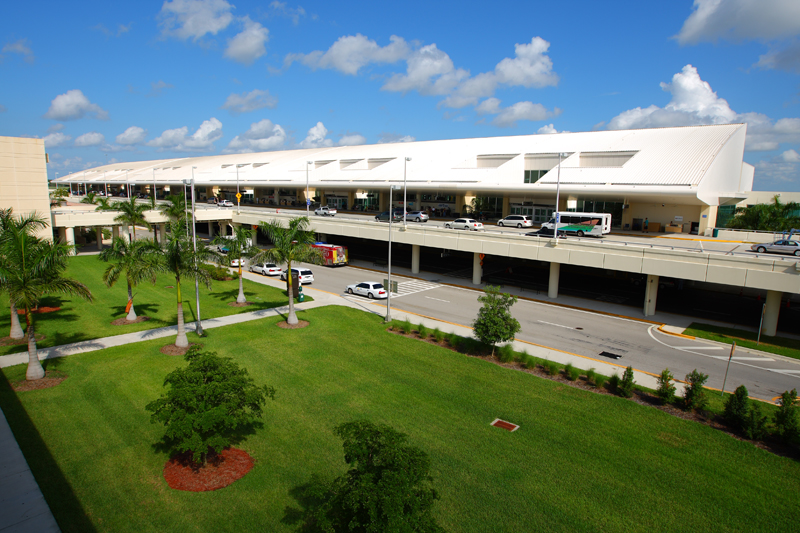
The entrance at the airport.

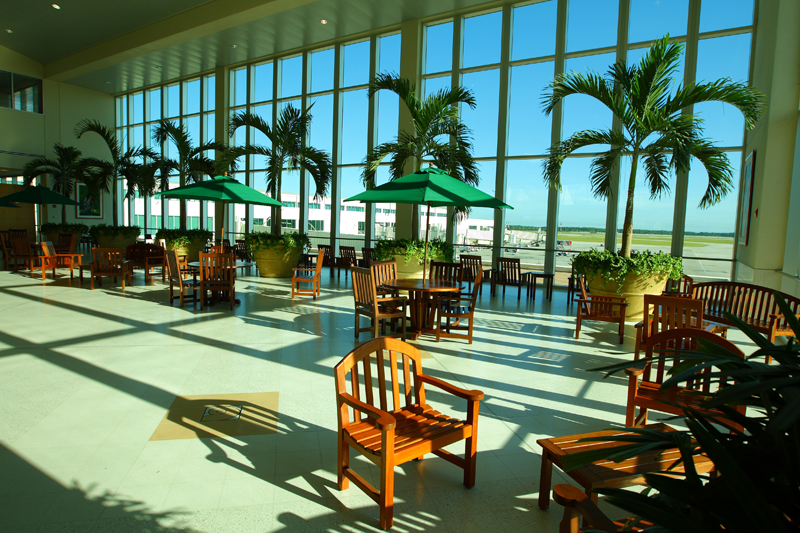
East Atrium

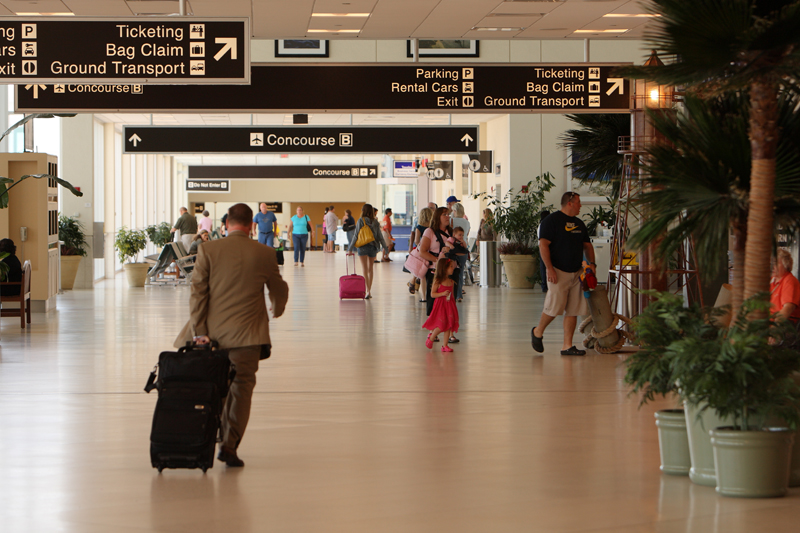
Main Terminal

Airfield

- The airport covers 13,555 acres (54.9 km^{2}), 10 mi (16 km) southeast of Fort Myers.

Runways

- The airport has one runway, designated as runway 06/24. It measures 12,000 x 150 ft (3,658 x 46 m) and has an asphalt surface.
- Studies for a future second runway is underway.

Activity

- In 2025 the airport had 99,958 aircraft operations, averaging 274 per day.

Terminal

- 798,000 sq ft (74,100 m^{2})
- Design capacity is 10 million passengers per year, with 28 gates on three concourses (current B,C and D). The terminal buildings can be expanded incrementally to 65 gates on five concourses (A-E).

Parking

- 11,250 spaces for hourly/daily parking located around the main terminal building and the entrance to the facility.
- There is a three-story parking structure adjacent from the main terminal, used to house short-term parking.
- 30-space "cell-phone lot" for customers picking up arriving passengers

Awards

- J.D. Power & Associates Airport Satisfaction Study – Ranked 2nd among North American airports with under 10 million annual passengers
- Florida Department of Transportation 2008 Commercial Airport of the Year
- Airports Council International-North America Excellence in Marketing and Communications 2008: 1st Place Special Events for Aviation Day
- Airports Council International-North America 2008: 1st Place for Concession Convenience and 2nd Place for Food Concessions
- Airports Council International-North America 2009: 2nd Place Newsletter – Internal or E-mail and 2nd Place Special Events – Berlin Airlift
- Federal Aviation Administration 2009 Disadvantaged Business Enterprise Advocate and Partner Award
- Florida Airports Council 2008 Environmental Excellence Award for Mitigation Park
- Airport Revenue News 2008 Best Concessions Award for top Concessions Program Design

== Terminal ==
The airport has one terminal with 27 gates on three concourses.

- Concourse B contains 9 gates (Gates B1-B9). It serves Air Canada, Alaska Airlines, Allegiant Air, Avelo Airlines, Discover Airlines, Frontier, Porter, Southwest, and Sun Country.
- Concourse C contains 9 gates (Gates C1-C9). It serves Delta Air Lines, United Airlines, and WestJet
- Concourse D contains 9 gates (Gates D1, D3, D5-D11). (Note: Gates D2 and D4 were removed to allow for the construction of Concourse E.) It serves American Airlines, Breeze Airways, and JetBlue.

Customs and Immigration services for international flights are located on the lower level of Concourse B. The concourses are each completely separate and are not currently connected Airside, though the expansion underway will consolidate the three checkpoints into one. Construction is also underway on a fourth concourse, Concourse E, on the west side of the terminal. Concourse E will include 14 gates and is planned to be complete by the end of 2027. The Concourse A designation has been reserved for an eventual fifth concourse to be added on the east side of the terminal.

== Airlines and destinations ==
=== Passenger ===
Airlines	Destinations	Refs
Air Canada	Seasonal: Montréal–Trudeau	
Air Canada Rouge	Toronto–Pearson	
Alaska Airlines	Seasonal: Seattle/Tacoma	
Allegiant Air	Allentown, Appleton, Des Moines, Flint (begins February 11, 2027)	
American Airlines	Charlotte, Chicago–O'Hare, Dallas/Fort Worth, Philadelphia, Washington–National; Seasonal: New York–LaGuardia, Phoenix–Sky Harbor	
Avelo Airlines	Charlotte/Concord, Dallas/McKinney, New Haven, Wilmington (DE)	
Breeze Airways	Atlantic City, Charleston (SC), Dayton, Hartford, Las Vegas, Long Island/Islip, Madison, Manchester (NH), New Haven, Norfolk, Portsmouth, Providence, Raleigh/Durham, Richmond, South Bend, Trenton (begins January 8, 2027), Wilmington (NC); Seasonal: Akron/Canton, Albany, Bangor, Burlington (VT), Columbus–Glenn, Greenville/Spartanburg, Lansing, Louisville, Newburgh, New Orleans, Pittsburgh, Portland (ME), Rochester (NY), Syracuse, Wilkes-Barre/Scranton	
Delta Air Lines	Atlanta, Boston, Cincinnati, Detroit, Minneapolis/St. Paul, New York–JFK, New York–LaGuardia; Seasonal: Austin, Salt Lake City	
Delta Connection	Raleigh/Durham (resumes November 21, 2026)	
Discover Airlines	Frankfurt	
Eastern Air Express	Seasonal charter: Havana	
Frontier Airlines	Chicago–O'Hare, Cincinnati, Cleveland, Denver, Philadelphia; Seasonal: Detroit	
JetBlue	Boston, Buffalo, New York–JFK, White Plains; Seasonal: Hartford, Long Island/Islip, Worcester	
Porter Airlines	Toronto–Pearson; Seasonal: Montréal–Trudeau, Ottawa	
Southwest Airlines	Baltimore, Chicago–Midway, Columbus–Glenn, Dallas–Love, Denver, Indianapolis, Kansas City, Milwaukee, Nashville, Orlando, Pittsburgh, St. Louis; Seasonal: Albany, Austin, Buffalo, Hartford, Houston–Hobby, Louisville, Omaha (begins March 13, 2027), Providence, Rochester (NY)	
Sun Country Airlines	Minneapolis/St. Paul; Seasonal: Appleton, Eau Claire, Madison, Milwaukee	
United Airlines	Chicago–O'Hare, Cleveland, Denver, Houston–Intercontinental, Newark, Washington–Dulles; Seasonal: Los Angeles, San Francisco	
WestJet	Toronto–Pearson	

== Statistics ==
=== Top destinations ===
Busiest domestic routes from RSW (January 2025 - December 2025)
Rank	City	Passengers	Carriers
1	Atlanta, Georgia	498,000	Delta, Frontier, Southwest
2	Chicago–O'Hare, Illinois	390,000	American, Frontier, Southwest, United
3	Minneapolis/St. Paul, Minnesota	338,000	Delta, Frontier, Southwest, Sun Country
4	Detroit, Michigan	321,000	Delta, Frontier
5	Boston, Massachusetts	304,000	Delta, JetBlue
6	Charlotte, North Carolina	301,000	American
7	Newark, New Jersey	276,000	United, JetBlue
8	Dallas/Fort Worth, Texas	191,000	American
9	Philadelphia, Pennsylvania	187,000	American, Frontier
10	Baltimore, Maryland	171,000	Southwest

=== Airline market share ===
Largest airlines at RSW (July 2025 - June 2026)
Rank	Airline	Passengers	Share
1	Delta Air Lines	2,334,000	21.76%
2	Southwest Airlines	2,022,000	18.85%
3	American Airlines	1,664,000	15.51%
4	United Airlines	1,643,000	15.31%
5	JetBlue	1,050,000	9.78%
	Other	2,016,000	18.79%

=== Annual traffic ===
Annual passenger traffic (enplaned + deplaned), 1983–present
Year	Passengers	Percent change	Year	Passengers	Percent change	Year	Passengers	Percent change	Year	Passengers	Percent change	Year	Passengers	Percent change
1983	594,185	Steady	1993	3,717,758	▲7.1%	2003	5,891,668	▲13.6%	2013	7,637,801	▲3.9%	2023	10,069,839	▼2.6%
1984	1,311,937	▲120.8%	1994	4,005,067	▲7.7%	2004	6,736,630	▲14.3%	2014	7,970,493	▲4.3%	2024	11,028,182	▲9.5%
1985	1,701,969	▲29.7%	1995	4,098,264	▲2.3%	2005	7,518,169	▲11.6%	2015	8,371,801	▲5.0%	2025	11,154,458	▲1.1%
1986	2,129,548	▲25.1%	1996	4,317,347	▲5.3%	2006	7,643,217	▲1.7%	2016	8,604,673	▲2.8%	2026		
1987	2,687,053	▲26.2%	1997	4,477,865	▲3.7%	2007	8,049,676	▲5.3%	2017	8,842,549	▲2.8%	2027		
1988	3,115,124	▲15.9%	1998	4,667,207	▲4.2%	2008	7,603,845	▼ -5.5%	2018	9,373,178	▲6.0%	2028		
1989	3,231,092	▲3.7%	1999	4,897,253	▲4.9%	2009	7,415,958	▼ -2.5%	2019	10,225,180	▲9.0%	2029		
1990	3,734,067	▲15.6%	2000	5,207,212	▲6.3%	2010	7,514,316	▲1.3%	2020	5,978,414	▼41.5%	2030		
1991	3,436,520	▼ -8.0%	2001	5,277,708	▲1.4%	2011	7,537,745	▲0.3%	2021	10,322,434	▲72.7%	2031		
1992	3,472,661	▲1.1%	2002	5,185,648	▼ -1.7%	2012	7,350,625	▼ -2.5%	2022	10,343,802	▲0.2%	2032		

- Since beginning commercial airline service on May 14, 1983 through the end of 2025, 264,450,098 (enplaned and deplaned) passengers have transited through RSW, average 6,150,002 passengers per year. There have been over 3.2 million aircraft operations at the airport since its opening.

== Accidents and incidents ==
- On November 28, 2007, a single-engine fixed wing aircraft crashed one mile (1.6 km) west of Runway 6. The pilot was killed.
- On April 12, 2009, a Beechcraft King Air 200 (N559DW) was carrying four passengers when the pilot went unconscious and later died. Doug White, a passenger, was guided into the airport by air traffic controller Brian Norton, assisted by controller Dan Favio. It was later reported that White was a single engine private pilot with about 130 hours of experience in single engine aircraft. All passengers aboard survived and the plane was not damaged.
- On October 18, 2022, a United Airlines Boeing 737-800 arriving from Newark, NJ safely landed but blew out two tires, stranding it on the airport's lone runway and forcing other incoming flights to be diverted while outbound flights were delayed. The runway was closed for nearly nine hours, as specialized equipment to fix the plane had to be driven over from Orlando.

== Ground transport ==
LeeTran bus No. 50 serves the airport.

Infrastructure and road projects linked the airport's main terminal road to the southbound and northbound lanes of Interstate 75.

== See also ==
- Southwest Florida
- Florida Suncoast
