= Mohawk Airlines Flight 112 =

1963 aviation accident

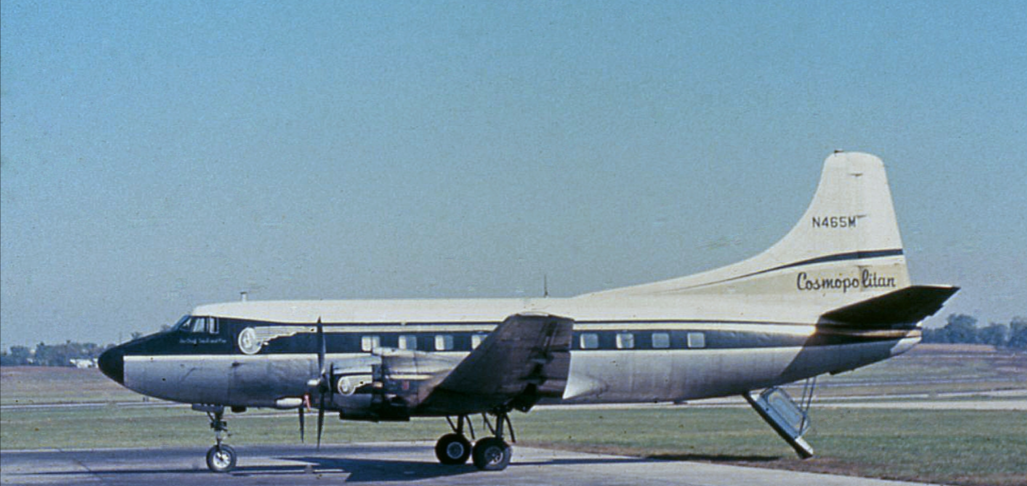
- A Martin 4-0-4 similar to the accident aircraft

Accident
- Date: July 2, 1963
- Summary: Pilot error, bad weather as a contributing factor
- Site: Rochester-Monroe Airport, Rochester, New York, United States; 43°07′24″N 77°40′32″W

Aircraft
- Aircraft type: Martin 4-0-4
- Operator: Mohawk Airlines, Inc.
- Registration: N449A
- Flight origin: Rochester-Monroe Airport, Rochester, New York
- Last stopover: Newark International Airport, Newark, New Jersey
- Passengers: 40
- Crew: 3
- Fatalities: 7
- Injuries: 36
- Survivors: 36

Mohawk Airlines Flight 112 was a scheduled passenger flight from Rochester-Monroe Airport in Rochester, New York to Newark International Airport in Newark, New Jersey. On July 2, 1963, the aircraft operating the flight, a Martin 4-0-4 with a total of 15,970 operational hours, crashed during takeoff. The accident killed 7 people (2 crewmen and 5 passengers) and injured 36.

Flight 112 attempted to take off on Rochester's runway 28 into a heavy thunderstorm. The co-pilot was unable to maintain control of the aircraft, and it fell to earth two minutes after takeoff. The plane struck the ground left wing-first. It then cartwheeled wing-over-wing and caught fire.

The co-pilot was flying the plane from the left seat in violation of company policy. Both pilots working together were unable to control the plane, as the wind had shifted from a headwind to a tailwind.

The Civil Aeronautics Board found the cause of the accident to be the pilot's decision to take off in bad weather, and cited the weather itself as a contributing factor.
