= Braden Airpark =

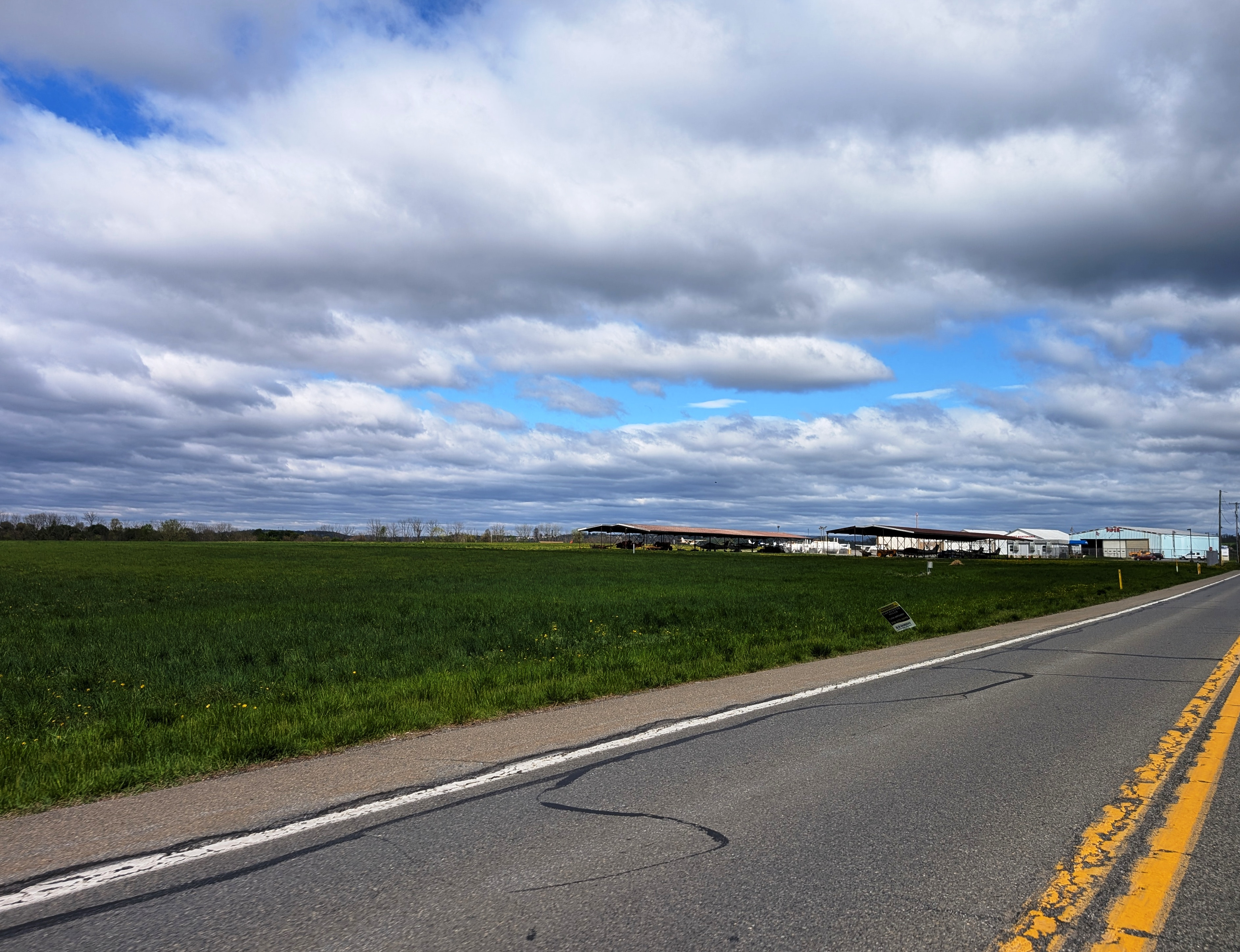
- Airport grounds from Sullivan Trail
- IATA: none; ICAO: none; FAA LID: N43

Summary
- Airport type: Public
- Owner: Lehigh Northampton Airport Authority
- Serves: Easton, Pennsylvania, U.S.
- Elevation AMSL: 399 ft (122 m)
- Coordinates: 40°44′31″N 75°14′34″W

Map
- Location of airport in Pennsylvania N43 (the United States)

Runways
Direction	Length		Surface
Direction	ft	m	Surface
18/36	1,956	596	Asphalt/Turf
- Source: Federal Aviation Administration

Braden Airpark (FAA LID: N43), also known as Easton Airport, is a small airport located about three nautical miles north of the central business district of Easton, Pennsylvania. The airport is owned by the Lehigh-Northampton Airport Authority, which also owns Lehigh Valley International Airport and Allentown Queen City Municipal Airport.

== History ==
On June 6, 2017, a $325,000 county grant was approved to replace the aging terminal, which was matched by funds from Lehigh-Northampton Airport Authority (LNAA). A modular building is planned to serve as the terminal while long-term plans are developed for the airport.

== Facilities and aircraft ==
This airport predominantly serves small general aviation aircraft. The single 18/36 runway is 1956 feet long and has a 50-foot wide asphalt surface in the center of a 165-foot wide turf strip. No commercial airlines serve the airport.

== See also ==
- List of airports in Pennsylvania
