= TWA Flight 400 =

1956 aviation accident

Coordinates: 40.487°N 80.208°W

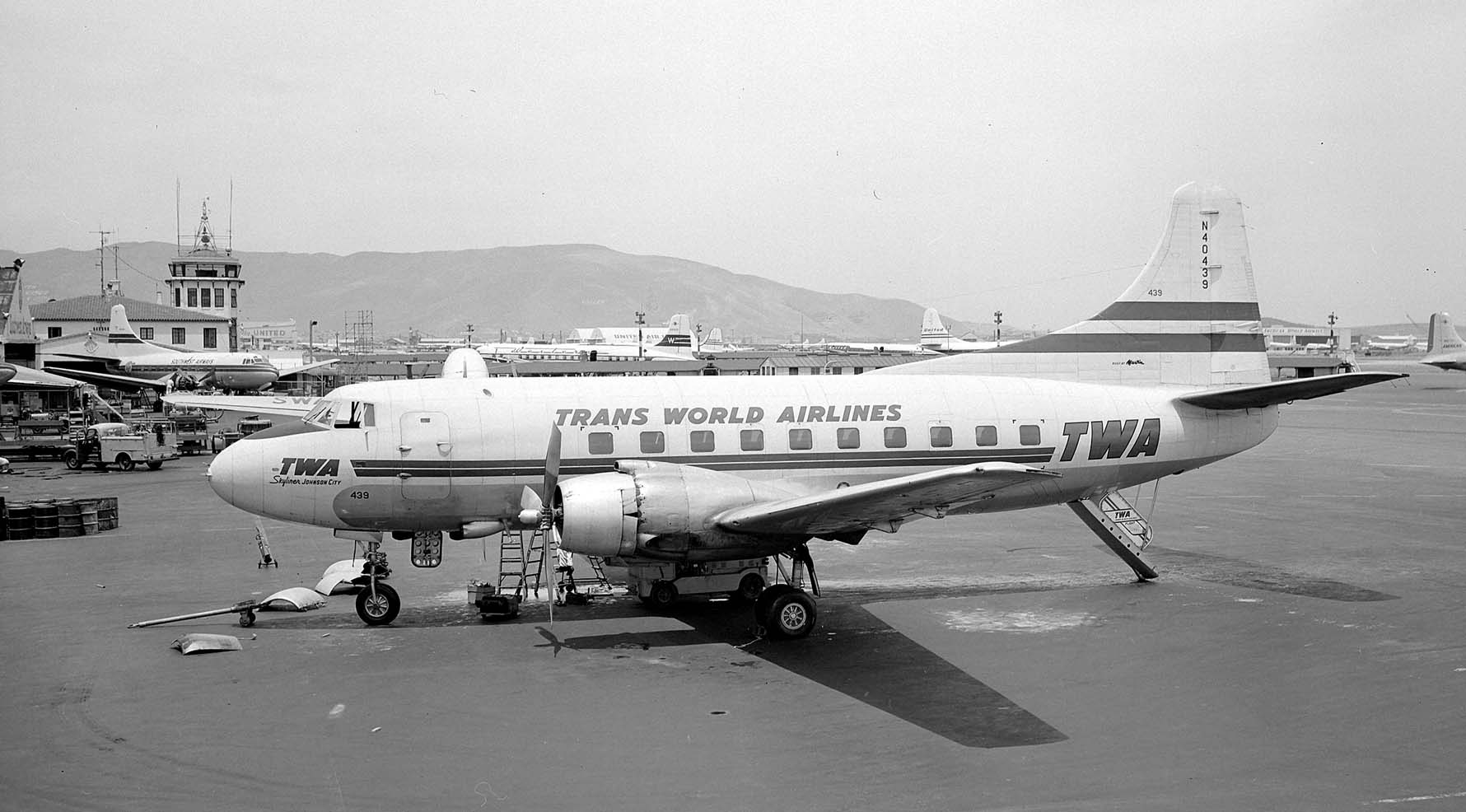
- A Martin 4-0-4 similar to the accident aircraft

Accident
- Date: April 1, 1956
- Summary: Mechanical failure followed by pilot error
- Site: Moon Township, Allegheny County, near Pittsburgh, Pennsylvania

Aircraft
- Aircraft type: Martin 4-0-4
- Operator: Trans World Airlines
- Registration: N40403
- Flight origin: Pittsburgh International Airport, Pennsylvania (PIT/KPIT)
- Destination: Newark International Airport, New Jersey (EWR/KEWR)
- Passengers: 33
- Crew: 3
- Fatalities: 22 (passengers:21 crew:1)
- Survivors: 14 (passengers:12 crew:2)

On April 1, 1956, a Martin 4-0-4, registration #N40403, operating as TWA Flight 400, crashed on takeoff from Greater Pittsburgh International Airport (PIT). Twenty-two of the 36 people aboard the aircraft, including one crewmember (Hostess Mary Jane Fanning), perished in the evening crash on Easter Sunday.

Flight 400 was to be an eastbound IFR flight from Pittsburgh to Newark International Airport (EWR) in New Jersey, with scheduled stops in eastern Pennsylvania at Harrisburg, Reading, and Allentown. On this particular flight, the first officer (Harlan V. Jesperson) was in the left seat, as he was being line-checked by the captain (Raymond F. McQuade); both pilots survived.

== Takeoff and crash ==
As the aircraft became airborne from runway 23 (since removed), a sharp yaw was experienced while the first officer reduced power at an altitude of approximately one hundred feet (30 m). Almost immediately, the fire warning light for the number one engine illuminated; however, the fire warning bell never sounded. At this point, the first officer is thought to have throttled down the number one engine. The captain had only noted the loss of power shown by the BMEP gauge, but never saw the fire warning light; he pulled the mixture to idle cutoff.

As the first officer reached for the manual feathering button, the captain stopped him. The captain indicated that the autofeather device would feather the no. 1 prop. This never occurred, due to the throttle lever being retarded to a position aft of the switches that arm the auto-feathering system. The no. 1 prop created sufficient drag, causing the aircraft to continue to yaw to the left. At only 1,690 feet (515 m) past the runway's end, the aircraft crashed at 7:20 PM.

The fire warning appears to have been caused by an exhaust connector clamp failure. Hot exhaust gases were blown directly onto an overheat detector.

== Cause ==
Probable cause of the crash has been determined as: "Uncoordinated emergency action in the very short time available to the crew, which produced an aircraft configuration with insurmountable drag".
