= Lehigh Valley International Airport =

Airport serving Hanover Township, Pennsylvania, USA

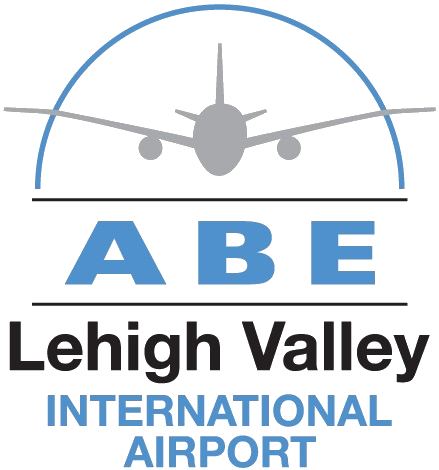

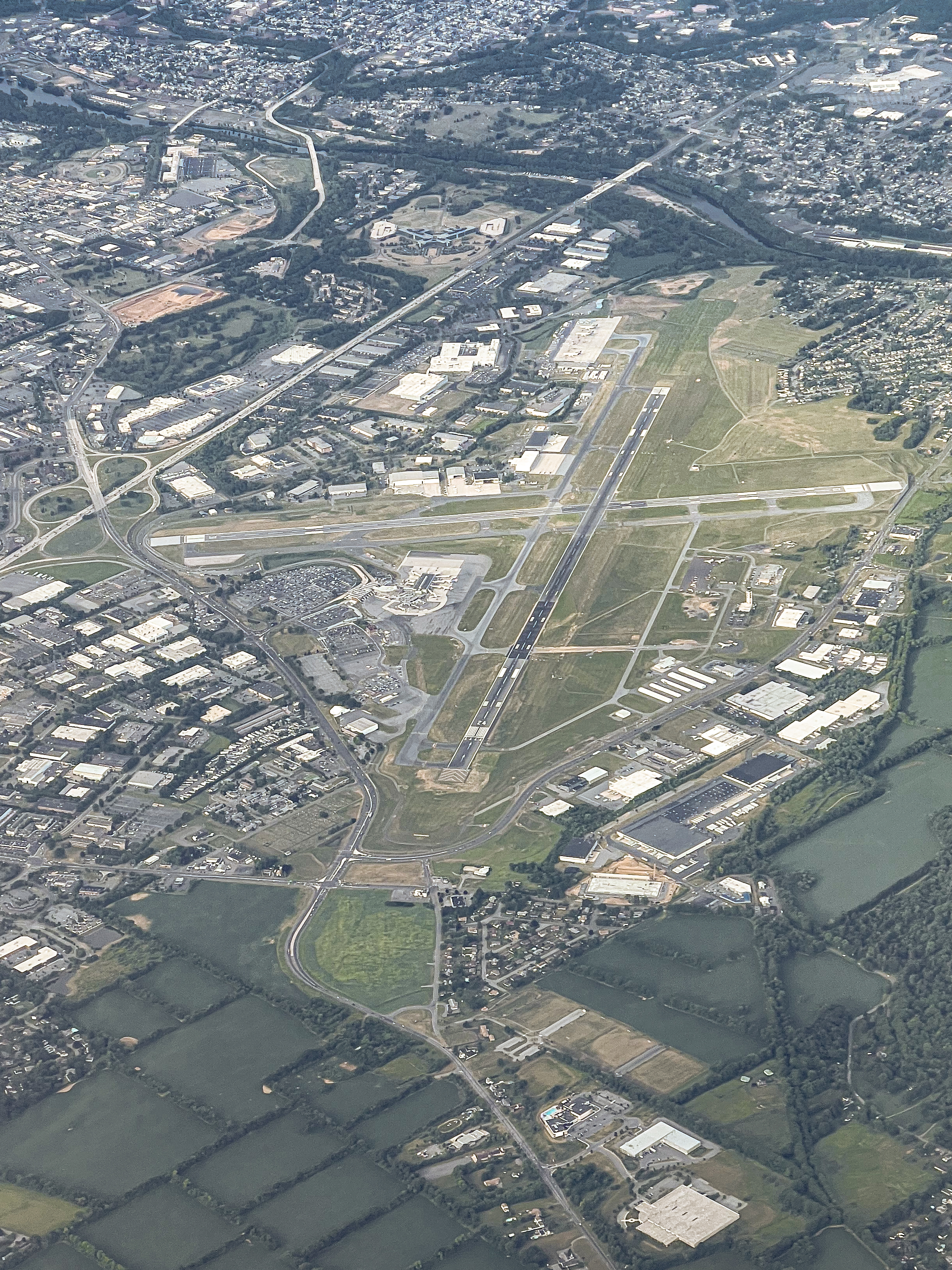
- Aerial view of Lehigh Valley International Airport in July 2022
- IATA: ABE; ICAO: KABE; FAA LID: ABE; WMO: 72517

Summary
- Airport type: Public
- Owner/Operator: Lehigh–Northampton Airport Authority
- Serves: Lehigh Valley
- Location: 3311 Airport Road, Allentown, Pennsylvania, U.S.
- Operating base for: Allegiant Air
- Elevation AMSL: 393 ft (120 m)
- Coordinates: 40°39′08.4″N 075°26′25.7″W
- Website: flyabe.com

Maps
- FAA diagram of the airport as of January 2021
- Interactive map of Lehigh Valley International Airport

Runways
Direction	Length		Surface
Direction	ft	m	Surface
06/24	7,599	2,316	Asphalt
13/31	5,800	1,768	Asphalt

Statistics (2025)
- Aircraft operations: 81,888
- Passenger volume: 1,067,114
- Cargo handled: 301,979,109
- Sources: airport website, transtats, and FAA

Lehigh Valley International Airport (IATA: ABE, ICAO: KABE, FAA LID: ABE), formerly Allentown–Bethlehem–Easton International Airport, is a domestic airport located in Hanover Township in Lehigh County, Pennsylvania. Lehigh Valley International Airport is located in the center of the Lehigh Valley, roughly 7 miles (11 km) northeast of Allentown, 4 miles (6.4 km) northwest of Bethlehem, and 11 miles (18 km) southwest of Easton.

Lehigh Valley International Airport is the fourth-busiest passenger airport in Pennsylvania after Philadelphia, Pittsburgh, and Harrisburg international airports. In 2025, the airport was utilized by 1,067,114 passengers and 301,979,109 pounds of cargo traffic, an all-time record for the airport. With over 81,000 flights in 2025, Lehigh Valley International Airport is the third-busiest airport in Pennsylvania after Philadelphia and Pittsburgh in terms of total flight takeoffs and landings.

The airport is also heavily utilized for the transport of air cargo due to the growth of e-commerce and its proximity to major population centers on the East Coast. As of 2022, the airport ships more than 237 million pounds of cargo. Companies such as Amazon.com are using the airport, a major factor in its growth. In the Summer of 2024, the airport set an all-time summer passenger traffic record with 297,000 passengers using the airport between June and August.

== History ==
=== 20th century ===
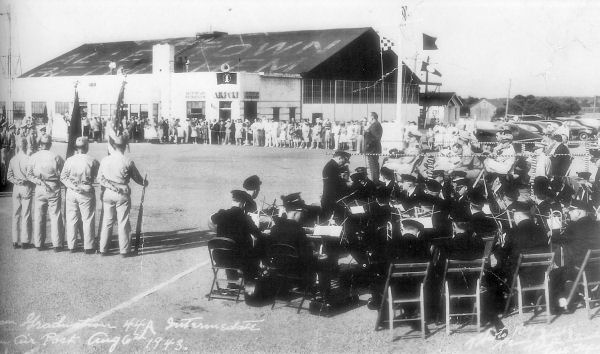
A U.S. Navy pilot training graduation ceremony at Lehigh Valley Airport in 1943 during World War II

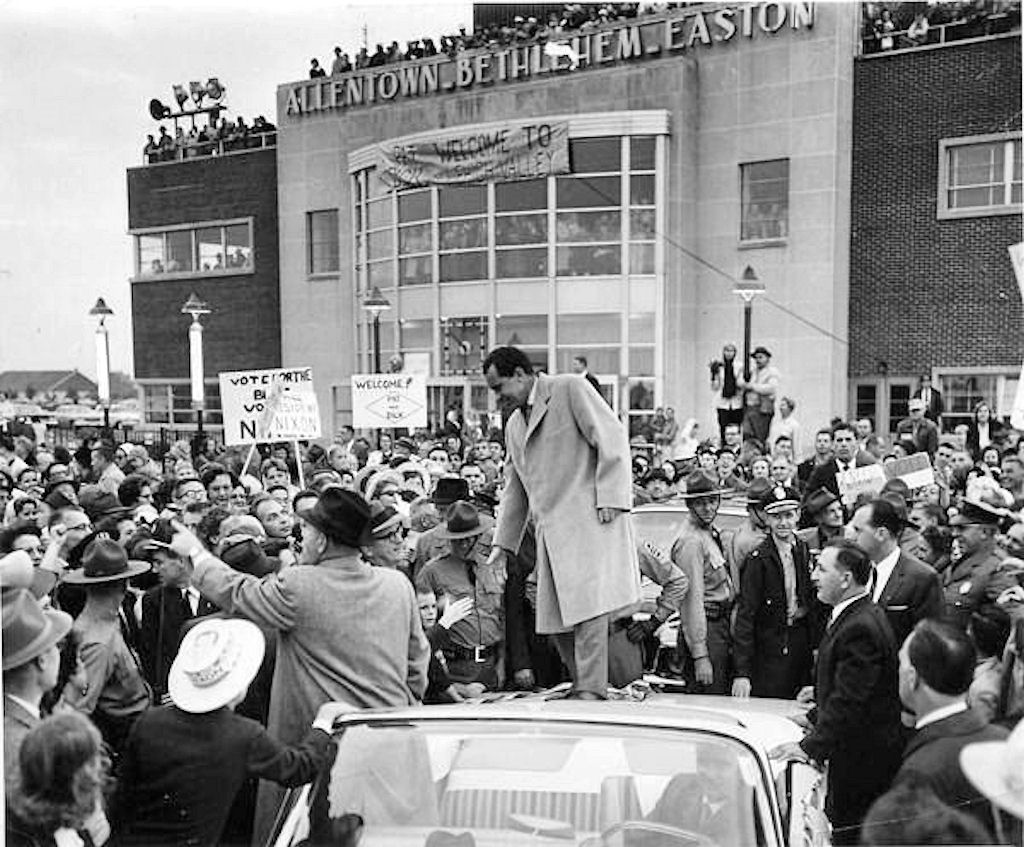
Richard Nixon at the airport during the 1960 presidential campaign

Lehigh Valley International Airport opened in 1929. Scheduled airline flights began on September 16, 1935, with flights by United Airlines' Boeing 247s. The airport hangar initially served as the passenger terminal. The first terminal building at the airport was built in 1938 as part of a Works Progress Administration project.

==== World War II ====
During World War II, the U.S. Navy's V-5 flight training program was conducted at the airport in conjunction with ground training held at nearby Muhlenberg College. The headquarters of Group 312 of the Civil Air Patrol was based at the airport. One of its activities was to provide a courier service for cargo defense plants. Allentown-based pilots patrolled the Atlantic coastline during World War II and were active in recruiting young men for the U.S. Air Force's air cadet program.

In January 1944, work on a new runway was completed, and a Class A U.S. Weather Bureau station also was installed. About 1,000 Naval Aviation Cadets were trained in 1943, and civil and military air traffic both increased.

In late July 1944, the War Production Board approved the construction of a second-story addition to the airport's administration building. The building housed the Lehigh Aircraft Company, the weather bureau station, the Civil Aeronautic communications station, and the office and waiting room of United Airlines. In August, the V-5 flight training program ended when the Navy decided to move all flight training to naval air bases under Navy pilots.

==== Expansion ====
In April 1946, the Lehigh Airport Authority was created to own and manage the airport. The October 1946 command and general staff diagram shows four runways forming an asterisk: runway 1 was 2680 feet long, runway 6 was 4000 feet, runway 9 was 3800 feet and runway 14 was 3100 feet.

Construction began on the present terminal in 1973. The project, designed by Wallace & Watson, was completed in 1976.

Construction on a new passenger terminal began in 1948 and was finished in 1950. Allentown–Bethlehem–Easton (ABE) Airport, as it was then called, had flights on United and TWA since 1947, and Colonial Airlines since 1949. Douglas DC-4s and DC-6s appeared after runway 6 was extended to 5,000 feet. TWA left in 1967, replaced by Allegheny Airlines; Colonial's successor Eastern Air Lines remained until 1991. Republic Airlines' McDonnell Douglas DC-9's offered nonstop flights to Detroit and were continued by Northwest Airlines after Northwest's acquisition of Republic. Northwest also offered one-stop flights to Detroit with a stop in Harrisburg.

=== 21st century ===
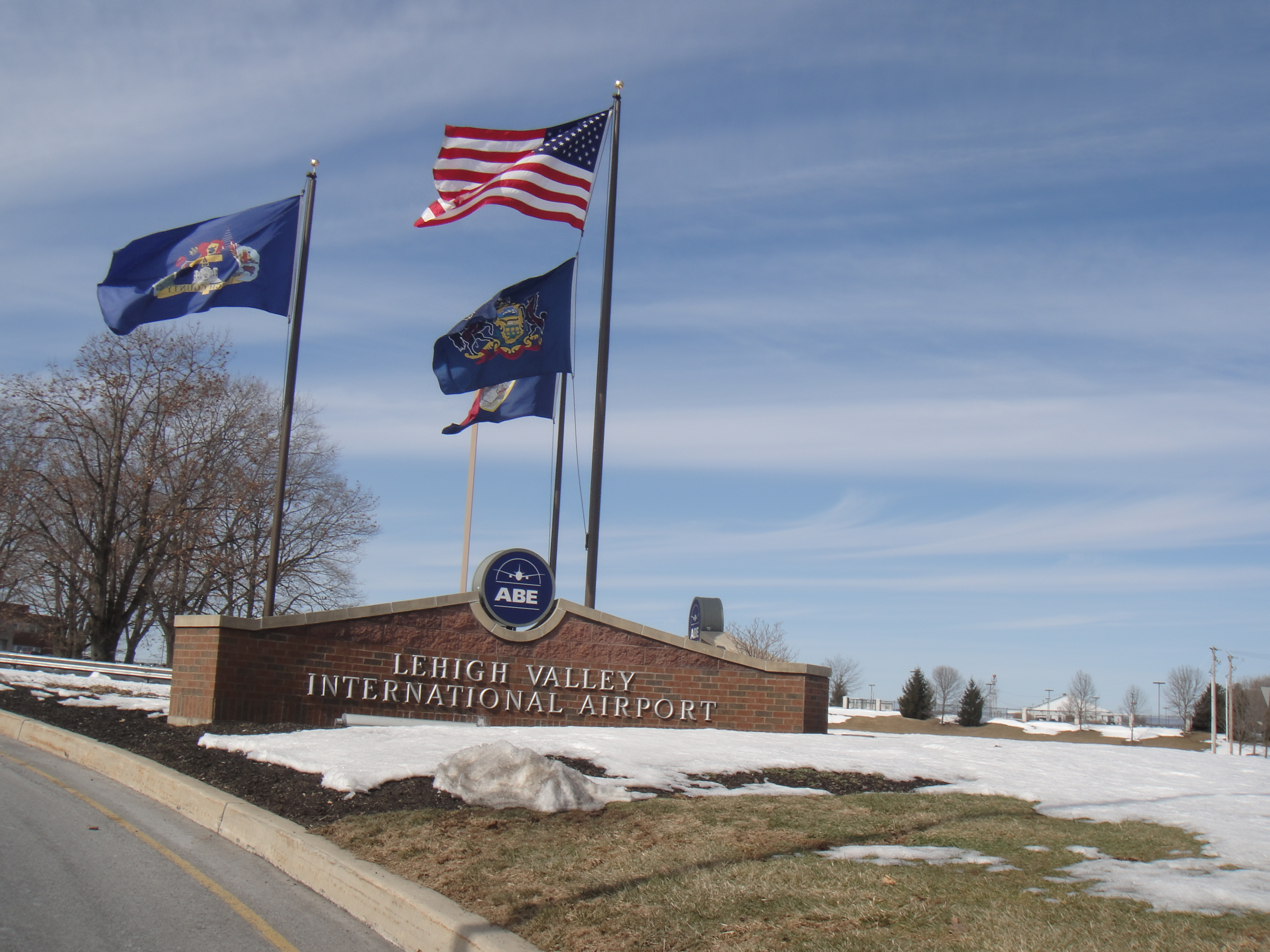
Entrance to Lehigh Valley International Airport in March 2014

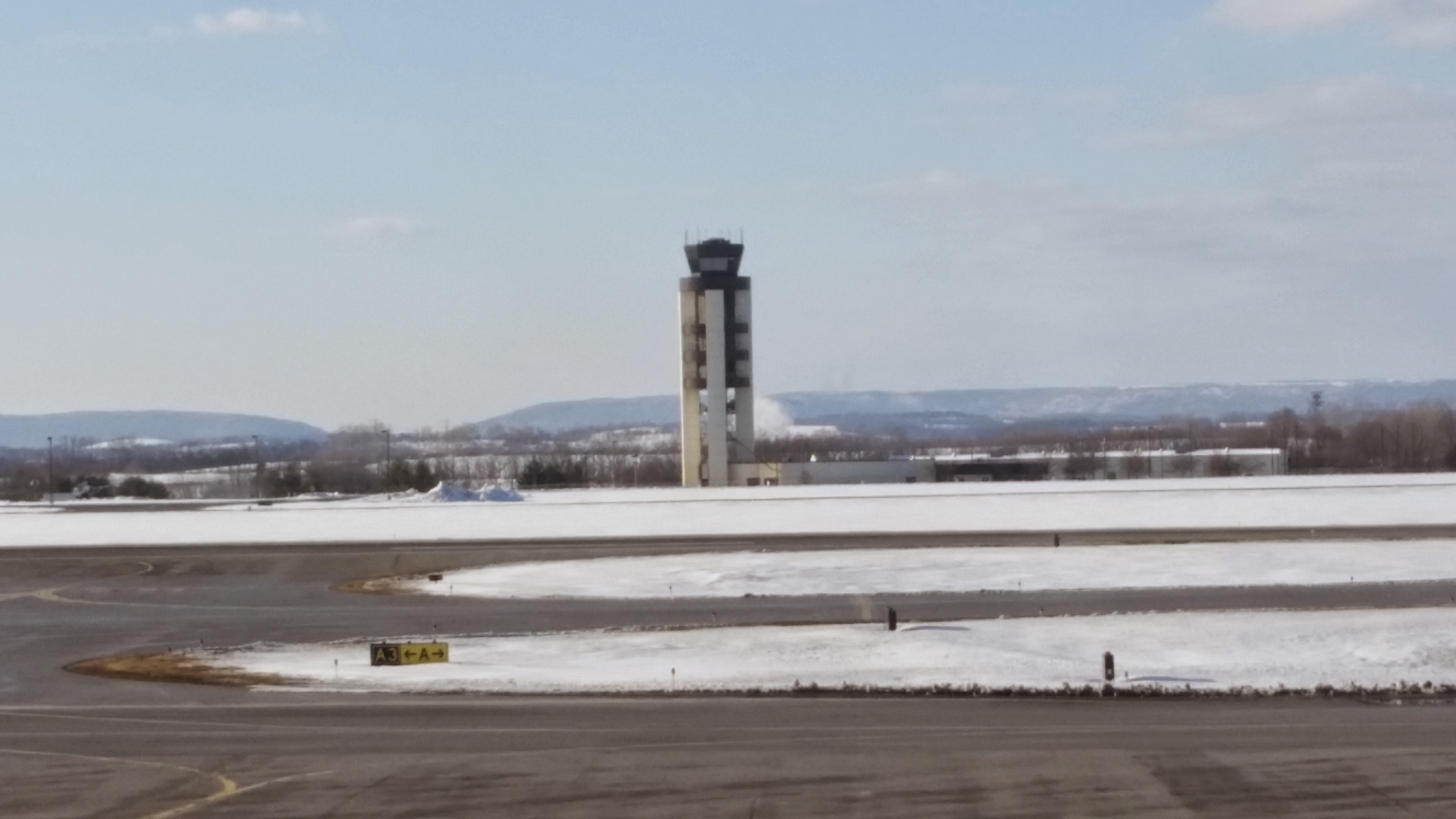
The air traffic control tower at Lehigh Valley International Airport in February 2015

Regional partners replaced the successor Northwest around 2003. Delta Air Lines started nonstop flights to Atlanta and Harrisburg in 1991 and later added flights to Cincinnati, initially operated by Delta until changing to Delta Connection carrier Comair.

In 2012, Frontier Airlines started twice-a-week nonstop Airbus A319 flights to Orlando International Airport; they ended in 2013. Allegiant Air now flies nonstop from Lehigh Valley to Orlando via Orlando Sanford International Airport (SFB) in nearby Sanford, Florida.

In 2009 and 2010, the most recent terminal renovations were completed in two phases:

- Phase I (April 2009). Cost: $7,253,235; PENNDOT grant amount: $3 million; general contractor: Lobar, Inc. (Dillsburg, Pennsylvania); architect: Breslin, Ridyard, Fadero Architects (Allentown); square footage of the Phase I project: 24,000 sq.ft., 7,000 sq.ft. of which is new space.
- Phase II (November 2010). Cost: about $7,225,000; PENNDOT grant amount: $3.5 million; general contractor: E.R. Stuebner Construction, Inc. (Reading); architect: Breslin, Ridyard, Fadero Architects (Allentown); square footage of renovated space: 33,600 sq.ft.

On May 26, 2016, Solar Impulse 2 (SI2), piloted by Bertrand Piccard, completed the 13th leg from Dayton, Ohio of the first around the world (43,041 km) fuel-less flight by this solar-powered plane with a landing at ABE. On June 11, 2016, André Borschberg began the 14th leg (ABE to JFK, which included a dramatic Statue of Liberty flyover). While at ABE, an open house was held for public viewing of the SI2 aircraft.

The Federal Aviation Administration (FAA) National Plan of Integrated Airport Systems for 2023–2027 categorizes Lehigh Valley International Airport as a small hub primary commercial service facility. In 2019 to 2023, the FAA categorized the airport as a "non-hub primary" and previous years it was categorized as a "small hub."

After several years of falling passenger counts in the early 2000s, the airport has lately experienced a significant rebound in passenger totals due to it being an alternative to the comparatively congested Philadelphia International and Newark Liberty International airports, its facility improvements, a rapidly growing regional population, carrier expansions, especially Allegiant Air, and multiple new routes being added for popular destinations and major hubs across the country.

In 2019, the airport was utilized by 911,970 passengers, which represented an increase of 15.01% over its use the previous year, in 2018. Much of this growth has been driven by Allegiant Airlines' expansion at the airport.

One of the shortest scheduled jet flights in the contiguous U.S. operated between Lehigh Valley Airport (ABE) and Philadelphia International Airport (PHL). Piedmont Airlines operating as American Eagle regularly flew an Embraer ERJ-145 regional jet on the 55-mile route on behalf of American Airlines via a code sharing agreement. The average time in the air was 20 minutes. It was the shortest flight in the contiguous United States until 2017, when it was surpassed by United Express's San Francisco to Santa Rosa route in 2017, which had an average time in the air of 16 minutes. The ABE-PHL flights ended in 2020.

In 2022, American announced the resumption of their ABE-PHL service, though instead of a plane, the "flights" would be operated by bus company Landline, and operate twice daily, though that has since increased to six times daily.

As of 2024, the airport provides incoming and outgoing direct flights over Allegiant Air, American Airlines, Delta Air Lines, and United Airlines. In June 2025, the airport served 99,966 passengers, an increase of 1.40 over that of June 2024 following an increase of 17.4% from June 2023.

In April 2024, Lehigh Valley International Airport was named the second-best small airport in the nation in a Newsweek readers poll.

== Facilities ==
The airport covers 2,278 acres (922 ha) at an elevation of 393 ft (119.8 m). It has two asphalt runways: 6/24 is 7,599 ft (2,316.2 m) by 150 ft (45.7 m). The second, 13/31, is 5,800 ft (1,767.8 m) by 150 ft (45.7 m).

The airport has nine gates to service the passenger flights and six holding spots for cargo aircraft, which largely include A300F cargo aircraft with FedEx and Boeing 767s with Amazon Air.

In 2022, the airport had 83,760 aircraft operations, the third-most among all Pennsylvania airports.

In May 2020, 137 aircraft were based at the airport: 73 single-engine, 11 multi-engine, 52 jet, and one helicopter.

In 2025, the airport handled 301,979,109 pounds (136,975,420 kg) of freight and mail.

The Lehigh-Northampton Airport Authority (LNAA) also operates two nearby general aviation airports, Allentown Queen City Municipal Airport on Lehigh Street in Allentown and Braden Airpark in Easton.

=== Fire department ===
Aircraft rescue and firefighting (ARFF) is provided by the LNAA ARFF Department, which consists of seven full-time and 5 part-time personnel, operating from a 13,000 sq.ft. facility commissioned in October 2003.

== Airlines and destinations ==
=== Passenger ===
Airlines	Destinations	Refs
Allegiant Air	Fort Lauderdale, Fort Myers, Melbourne/Orlando, Myrtle Beach, Nashville, Orlando, Orlando/Sanford, Punta Gorda (FL), Sarasota, St. Petersburg/Clearwater	
American Eagle	Charlotte, Chicago–O'Hare	
Delta Air Lines	Atlanta	
Delta Connection	Atlanta	
United Express	Chicago–O'Hare	

=== Cargo ===
Amazon.com used the Lehigh Valley International Airport (LVIA) as one of the first five locations in the United States for their Amazon Air shipping service. LVIA was selected for the pilot concept of the program due to its close proximity to large population centers, cost-effectiveness, and robust infrastructure.

For similar reasons as Amazon, FedEx Ground selected an area that was once owned by the Lehigh Northampton Airport Authority to construct its largest terminal in the country as of 2016.

Former carriers

- Southeast Airlines (November 2002 – 2004)
- AirTran Airways (April 2009–August 2012)
- Air Canada, Air Toronto, Air Georgian (until 2012)
- Trans World Airlines (November 1993–
- Provincetown-Boston Airlines
- Freedom Airlines
- Eastern Airlines
- Frontier Airlines
- US Airways, USAir, Allegheny Airlines
- Republic Airlines
- Continental Airlines, Continental Express
- Piedmont Airlines, Piedmont Connection
- Presidential Airways
- Colgan Airways
- Suburban Airlines
- Altair Airlines
- Monmouth Airlines
- Canadian Partners, Ontario Express
- Holiday Airlines
- Hooters Air (May 2005-April 2006)

== Bus service ==
Airline shuttles
Operators	Destinations	Notes	Refs
American Airlines (operated by Landline)	Philadelphia	Passengers check bags and clear security at ABE, and go directly to PHL via motorcoach.	

Trans-Bridge Lines runs several daily buses from ABE to Manhattan, stopping at both Newark (EWR) and New York (JFK) Airports. Travel time to EWR is about 75 minutes.

United Airlines had a bus service to Newark Liberty International Airport (EWR) that was discontinued in late 2025. Continental Airlines, which later merged into United, previously operated flights from Allentown to Newark but switched to a bus service in 1995 due to constant delays from air traffic control. The distance is 79 miles (127 km). As of 1997, the service was eight times daily. Today, the service is offered three times daily. It was discontinued on September 1, 2025. By February 2010, bus was the only form of service offered by Continental after it cancelled its Allentown to Cleveland Hopkins International Airport flights.

American Airlines operates a bus service to Philadelphia International Airport.

LANta provides local bus service to the airport with routes 103 (Northampton), 105 (Bethlehem-Hellertown), 319 (Allentown), and 324 (Allentown-Bethlehem).

== Statistics ==
=== Annual traffic ===
Annual passenger traffic (enplaned + deplaned) at ABE, 2000 through 2025
Year	Passengers	Change	Year	Passengers	Change	Year	Passengers	Change
2000	1,013,710	—	2010	838,141	▲11.98%	2020	390,764	▼57.15%
2001	912,904	▼9.94%	2011	873,351	▲4.2%	2021	752,111	▲92.47%
2002	798,154	▼12.57%	2012	723,556	▼17.15%	2022	912,256	▲21.29%
2003	982,777	▲23.13%	2013	621,896	▼14.05%	2023	930,946	▲2.05%
2004	1,009,951	▲2.76%	2014	612,650	▼1.48%	2024	1,012,120	▲8.72%
2005	831,570	▼17.66%	2015	673,097	▲9.86%	2025	1,067,114	▲5.43%
2006	788,511	▼5.18%	2016	688,505	▲2.23%			
2007	847,527	▲7.48%	2017	692,154	▲0.50%			
2008	779,968	▼7.97%	2018	792,974	▲14.57%			
2009	748,482	▼4.03%	2019	911,970	▲15.01%			

=== Carrier shares ===
Carrier shares (July 2025 – June 2026) Based on enplaned passengers both departing and arriving.
Carrier	Passengers (arriving and departing)
Allegiant	635,000(66.42%)
Endeavor Air	134,000(13.98%)
PSA	94,450(9.88%)
GoJet	59,330(6.21%)
SkyWest	23,970(2.51%)
Other	9,620(1.01%)

=== Top destinations ===
Top destinations (July 2025 – June 2026)
Rank	Airport	Passengers	Carriers
1	Orlando/Sanford, Florida	102,800	Allegiant
2	Atlanta, Georgia	68,420	Delta
3	Charlotte, North Carolina	47,430	American
4	St. Petersburg-Clearwater, Florida	45,240	Allegiant
5	Chicago–O'Hare, Illinois	43,840	American, United
6	Punta Gorda, Florida	38,960	Allegiant
7	Myrtle Beach, South Carolina	35,800	Allegiant
8	Fort Lauderdale, Florida	17,720	Allegiant
9	Orlando, Florida	17,190	Allegiant
10	Sarasota–Bradenton, Florida	17,150	Allegiant

== Incidents and accidents ==
=== 20th century ===
- On May 5, 1972, Eastern Air Lines Flight 175, a Boeing 727 en route to Washington National Airport was hijacked by Frederick Hahneman, a Honduran-American. The plane eventually landed in Honduras after Hahneman parachuted in mid-flight with $300,000 in ransom money. There were no fatalities or injuries.

=== 21st century ===
- On September 19, 2008, Mesa Airlines Flight 7138, a Bombardier CRJ700, was forced to make a high-speed aborted takeoff and swerve in order to avoid a collision with a Cessna 172 that had yet to exit the airport's runway after landing. There were no fatalities or injuries.
- On November 16, 2008, US Airways Flight 4551, a US Airways Express De Havilland Canada Dash 8 turboprop operated by Piedmont Airlines, took off from Lehigh Valley International Airport at 8:20 am headed to Philadelphia International Airport when the flight was forced to make an emergency landing. The flight crew indicated that the front nose gear had not come down, and the plane had to make a flyover of the runway for confirmation. There were no injuries among the 35 passengers and three crew members.
- On June 27, 2009, Allegiant Air Flight 746, a McDonnell Douglas MD-80 aircraft, made an emergency landing at the airport after flames were observed coming from the aircraft's left engine. The flight was bound for Orlando Sanford International Airport. During takeoff, one of the aircraft's tires shredded and part of it was sucked into the engine, causing engine failure and a momentary fire. The plane landed safely minutes later with no injuries reported.
- On February 27, 2023, Mark Muffley, a passenger from Lansford, Pennsylvania, attempted to board an Allegiant Air flight from Lehigh Valley International Airport to Orlando International Airport after having allegedly checked luggage that included an explosive device. After being paged, the passenger fled the airport and was later arrested by federal agents and charged with " attempting to place an explosive device on an aircraft and possessing an explosive in an airport."

== Notable visits ==
=== Air Force One ===
Since its opening, Air Force One has made multiple landings at Lehigh Valley International Airport:

- 2025: U.S. president Donald Trump made a stop at ABE in August 2025 while on the way to his golf course in Bedminster, New Jersey.
- 2024: U.S. president Joe Biden made a stop in the Lehigh Valley to tour Allentown-area businesses.
- 2024: Trump made two campaign stops at ABE in April and October 2024 during the 2024 presidential campaign.
- 2021: Biden made a stop in the Lehigh Valley to tour Mack trucks in July.
- 2020: Trump made two campaign stops at ABE in May and October 2020 during the 2020 presidential campaign.
- 2004: U.S. president George W. Bush visited ABE in 2004.
- 1995: U.S. president Bill Clinton landed at ABE before giving a speech at Kutztown University.
- 1992: U.S. president George H. W. Bush visited ABE in 1992 onboard Air Force One, a Boeing VC-25.

=== Other notable visits ===
- 1960: U.S. vice president Richard Nixon and U.S. senator John F. Kennedy made campaign stops at ABE during the 1960 presidential campaign.

== See also ==
- List of airports in Pennsylvania
