= Allentown Queen City Municipal Airport =

Allentown Queen City Municipal Airport Queen City Airport

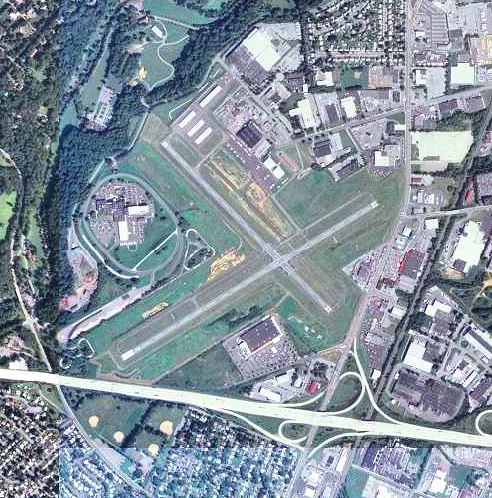
- An aerial view of Allentown Queen City Municipal Airport in 2006
- IATA: none; ICAO: KXLL; FAA LID: XLL

Summary
- Airport type: Public
- Owner: Lehigh-Northampton Airport Authority
- Serves: Allentown, Pennsylvania, U.S.
- Location: Allentown, Pennsylvania
- Elevation AMSL: 399 ft (122 m)
- Coordinates: 40°34′13″N 075°29′18″W

Map
- Location of Allentown Queen City Municipal Airport in Pennsylvania XLL (the United States)

Runways
Direction	Length		Surface
Direction	ft	m	Surface
7/25	3,950	1,204	Asphalt
15/33	3,160	963	Asphalt

Statistics (2023)
- Aircraft operations (year ending 3/15/2023): 25,660
- Based aircraft: 57
- Source: Federal Aviation Administration

Allentown Queen City Municipal Airport (ICAO: KXLL, FAA LID: XLL), also known as Queen City Airport, is a public airport on Vultee Street two miles southwest of downtown Allentown in Lehigh County, Pennsylvania. The airport is owned by the Lehigh-Northampton Airport Authority (LNAA).

Allentown Queen City Municipal Airport houses the Civil Air Patrol's Squadron 805, Lehigh Valley Aviation Services, a fixed-base operator, Vertivue Air Charters, a private airplane and helicopter charter service, and FlyGateway Aviation Institute, formerly Gateway Aviation, which is a multi-location flight school affiliated with and utilized by Liberty University and FlyGateway's career pilot programs.

On July 31, 2008, the Federal Aviation Administration (FAA) airport identifier briefly changed from 1N9 to JVU. After seeking approval for an identifier associated with the airport, the FAA approved the airport's identifier change to XLL, which was implemented on November 20, 2008. The airport does not have an assigned IATA code.

== History ==
=== 20th century ===
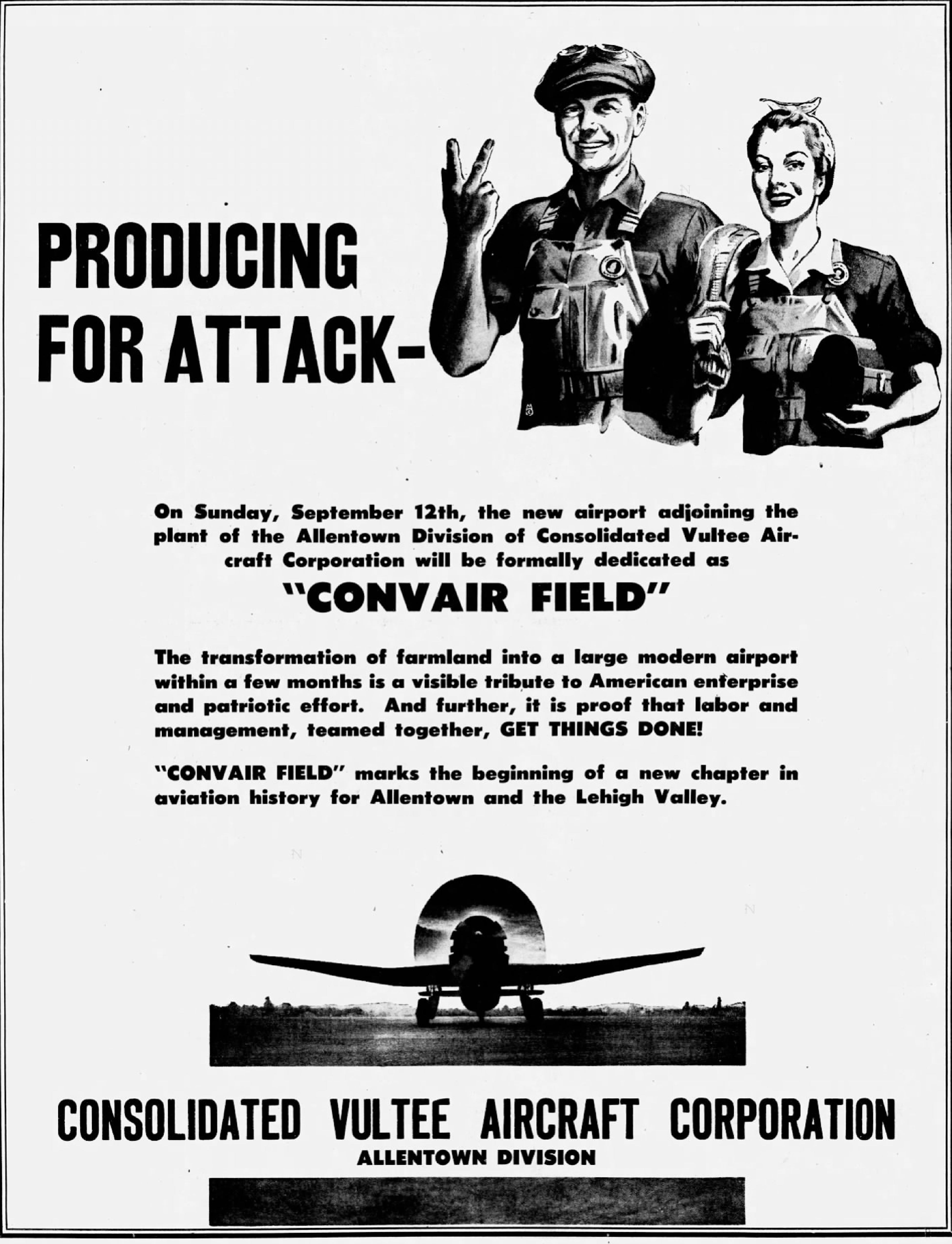
A flyer advertising the opening of Convair Field in 1943

In mid-December 1942, during World War II, Allentown, Pennsylvania, was the site for the production of the TBY-2 Sea Wolf torpedo bomber used by U.S. Navy. The bomber was manufactured at Mack Trucks' Plant 5C. Consolidated Vultee built present-day Allentown Queen City Municipal Airport, which included an office building, hangar, the airport, and a highway that linked the plant to the new airport complex.

Mack Trucks initially was reluctant to give up Plant 5C because they considered it essential for wartime truck production; however, the War Production Board and the U.S. Navy overruled them. Convair Field, as the airfield was originally named, was dedicated on October 10, 1943.

When the plant reached full production, it employed several thousand people, over half of whom were women. Consolidated Vultee became Allentown's second-largest industry, handling over $100 million in World War II contracts. Along with the airfield and manufacturing facilities, a new neighborhood of homes was built for the aircraft workers and their families. In December 1943, the National Housing Center approved the construction of 250 units for Vultee workers on a tract bounded by 12th, 14th, Harrison, and Wyoming streets and included Liberator Avenue, Catalina Avenue, and Vultee Street. The neighborhood, established by the Allentown Housing Authority, still exists in the city.

By 1943, the facility was producing components for the BT-13 Valiant trainer and B-24 Liberator bomber. In September 1943, Consolidated Vultee received an order to build 1,100 TBY-2 Sea Wolf torpedo bombers for the Navy. There were production delays lasting nearly a year, but the first aircraft were delivered to the Navy on November 7, 1944. By this time, the usefulness of the plane became limited as the Grumman TBF Avenger was the primary torpedo bomber in combat, equipping all Navy torpedo squadrons. Subsequently, only 180 TBY-2s were produced and none were used in combat.

With the end World War II in 1945, aircraft production at the facility ceased, and Plant 5C was returned to Mack Trucks. The remainder of the facility was declared surplus by the War Assets Administration.

On July 10, 1947, ownership of Convair Field was transferred from the U.S. federal government to the City of Allentown. As part of the transfer, Allentown agreed to keep the airport open as an emergency landing field.

The following year, in 1948, the Pennsylvania Air National Guard signed a lease to take over the aviation facilities for flight training in support of the 148th Fighter Squadron at Reading Airport.

During the 1950s, a series of training exercises was carried out at Convair Field.

Due to budgetary cutbacks the Reserve Training Center at Reading was inactivated on May 1, 1950, and reassigned to New Castle County Airport in Delaware. The U.S. Air Force subsequently closed its facilities at Reading Airport and returned it to civil control.

In 1951, the Air National Guard facilities in Allentown were turned over to Air Products and Chemicals. Air Products paid $12,000 annually in rent, which was used for the airport's maintenance. The runways were used by the Allentown Jaycees in an attempt to move drag racing, which was then popular on Allentown streets, off public roads in the city. Local residents objected to the transfer, however, claiming the runways should be used for aviation.

Throughout the 1950s, several plans were made to redevelop the land, but none of them were adopted because they failed to meet the aviation clause in the airport's 1947 transfer agreement with the City of Allentown.

In 1961, the City of Allentown took over full control of the facility and renamed it Queen City Airport. Aviation facilities were contracted to Reading Aviation for operation of the airfield. The FAA allowed some of the land surrounding the airport to be used by private industry, which led to the development of the present-day industrial park along Vultee Street.

Since its founding, Queen City Airport has been the scene of numerous air shows and other events. In the 1980s, several popular hot air balloon events were held at the airport, and it hosted the city's annual Fourth of July fireworks display for several years. Since the development of Lehigh Valley International Airport, the region's primary commercial airport, Queen City has become used predominantly for private aviation.

In the 1990s, conflict again arose between the U.S. federal government and the City of Allentown, and it was determined that a suitable substitute airport would need to be established to replace it if the airport was not being used predominantly for aviation.

=== 21st century ===
The airport is owned and operated by the Lehigh-Northampton Airport Authority (LNAA), which bought it from the City of Allentown in 2000. LNAA also manages Lehigh Valley International Airport and Braden Airpark.

In 2006, Allentown Queen City Municipal Airport was awarded "General Aviation Airport of the Year" by the Federal Aviation Administration.

In 2013, the City of Allentown stated that it sought to purchase a portion of the airport from LNAA, including the World War II-era hangar, which is now used to garage city vehicles. A large warehouse is proposed to be built on the airport site, which would not interfere with the airport's runways and taxiways that must be left intact for general aviation use under the FAA's aviation clause.

== Facilities ==
The airport covers 201 acres (81 ha) at an elevation of 399 feet (122 m). It has two asphalt runways: 7/25 is 3,950 by 75 feet (1,204 by 23 meters) and 15/33 is 3,160 by 75 feet (963 by 23 meters).

As of March 2023, the airport had 25,660 aircraft operations annually, averaging 70 per day with 98% of them used for general aviation, 2% for air taxi, and less than one percent used for military purposes. There are 57 aircraft based at the airport, including 44 single-engine, 9 multi-engine, one jet, and three helicopters.

flyGATEWAY is the flight school on the field; it has a Part 141 career-focused flight school with multiple locations in PA & DE, along with a Cirrus Certified Training Center.

== See also ==
- List of airports in Pennsylvania
