= Marco Island Airways =

American airline

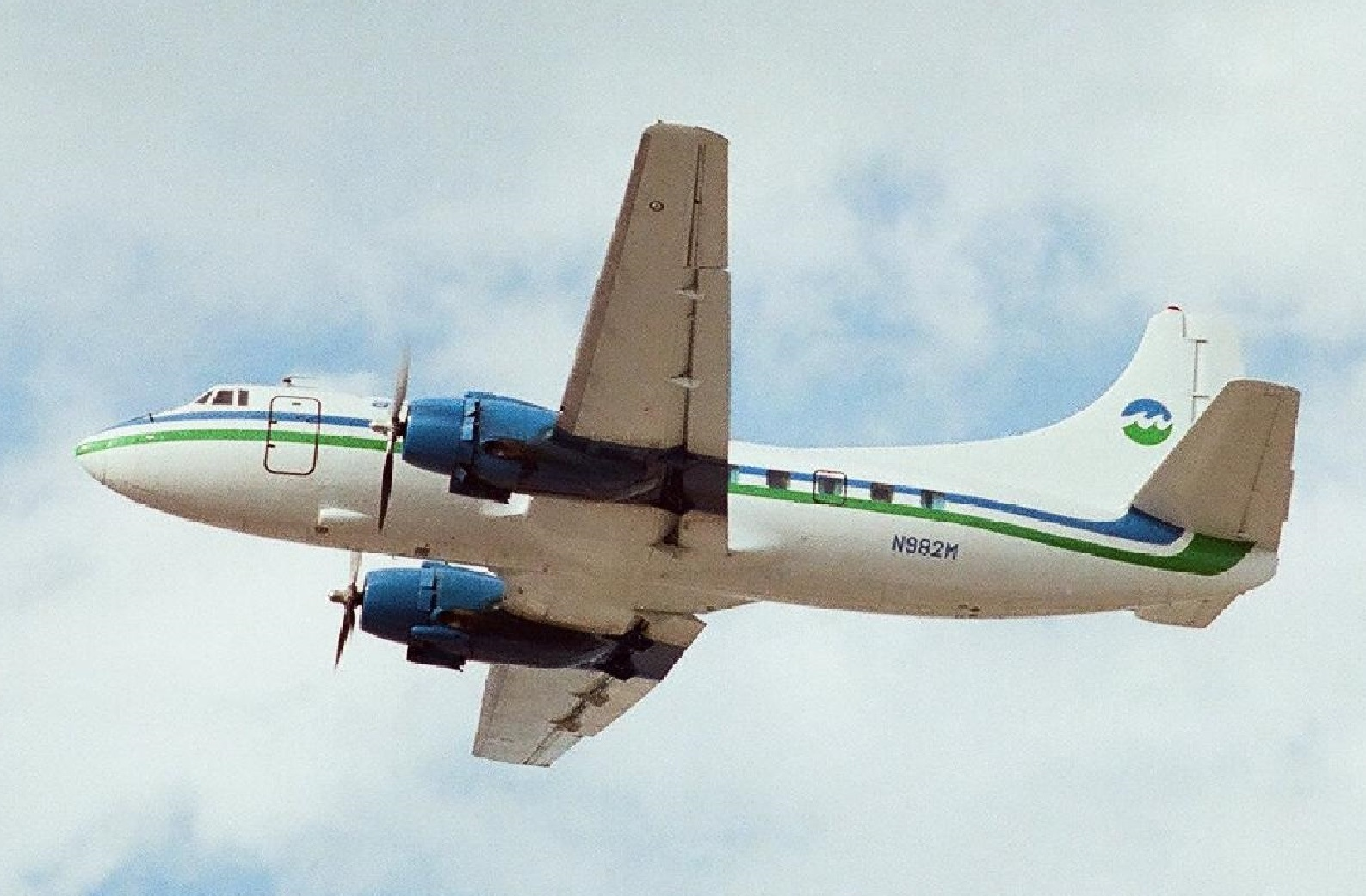
- Martin 404
- Founded: 1972; 54 years ago
- Commenced operations: 1973; 53 years ago
- Ceased operations: 1986; 40 years ago
- Hubs: Miami International Airport
- Secondary hubs: Marco Island
- Fleet size: Five (1985)
- Destinations: Miami, Marco Island, Lakeland, Florida, Bahamas.
- Headquarters: Miami

Marco Island Airways is a defunct airline that was based in Miami, Florida, United States.

== History ==
Marco Island Airways was formed in 1972 and commenced scheduled flights in 1973 from Miami International Airport, with a maintenance base at Opa Locka Airport on the western outskirts of Miami. Initial scheduled services were flown between Miami and Marco Island on Florida's Gulf Coast. Services were added to Tampa in 1980 and to Lakeland, Florida in 1981.

The airline also operated contract flights, as Air Florida Commuter, but retaining the Marco Island color scheme, in the early 1980s with service to Key West and the Bahamas. The airline was acquired by Provincetown-Boston Airline (PBA) in 1984 and its operations were fully merged into PBA during June 1986.

== Fleet ==
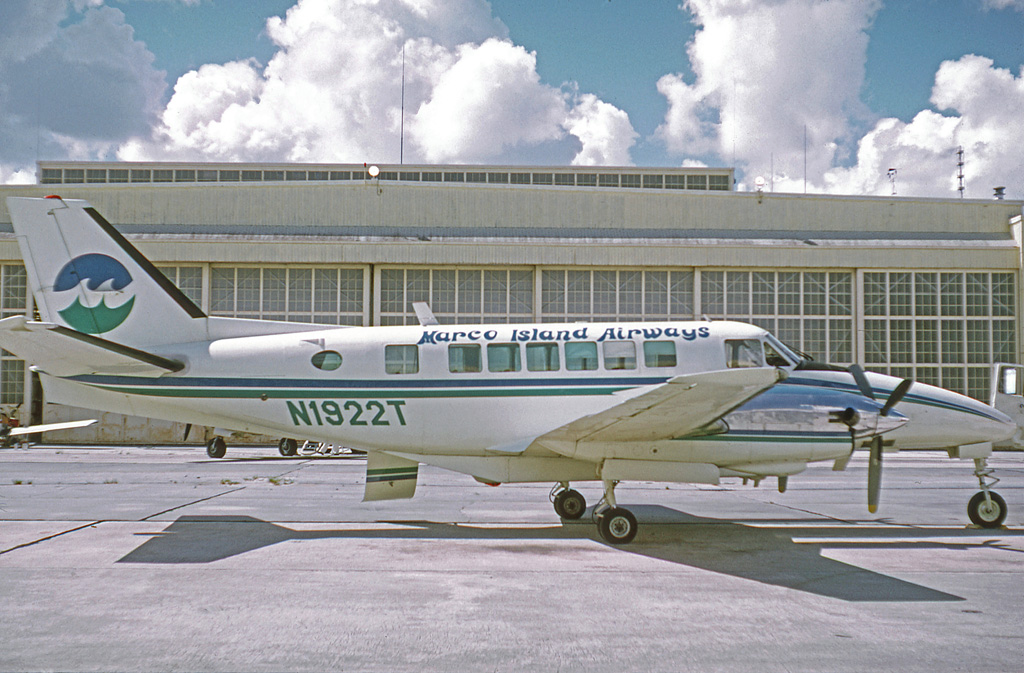
Beech 99A of Marco Island Airways at Opa Locka Airport Miami in 1973

The Marco Island Airways fleet initially consisted of six Martin 4-0-4 twin-engine pressurized piston-engine 44-seat airliners (shown in heading image), five examples being operated as at March 1985. Three of the smaller twin turboprop Beech 99 (N1921T, N1922T, N1923T) were included in the fleet in 1973. Four Piper PA-31 Navajo eight-seat airliner was also operated in the early 1980s.

== See also ==
- List of defunct airlines of the United States

== Bibliography ==
- Killion, S.D., The Martinliners, Airways International Inc, 1997, ISBN 0-9653993-2-X
- Wilkinson, D., Airline Fleets 1985, Air-Britain (Historians) Ltd, 1985, ISBN 0-85130-123-1
