= Airways International =

Airline based in Miami, Florida, US

IATA	ICAO	Call sign
HO	AWB	Airnat
- Founded: 1979; 47 years ago
- Commenced operations: 1981; 45 years ago
- Ceased operations: 1999; 27 years ago
- Hubs: Miami International Airport
- Secondary hubs: Fort Lauderdale International Airport
- Focus cities: West Palm Beach International Airport
- Destinations: Approximately 15
- Parent company: Airways International, Inc.
- Headquarters: Miami, Florida, United States
- Key people: Izad Djahanshahi, President and founder

Airways International was an airline based in Miami, Florida. Airways international was founded in 1979 and began operations around 1984. The airline ceased operations in 1999. The carrier's primary business focus was flights within southern Florida and to the Bahamas. Airways International also operated charter flights.

== History ==
The airline was founded by Iranian-born mechanic and entrepreneur, Izad Djahanhashi. He bought his first Cessna 402 in 1981.

According to the company, its revenues in 1993 were about $10 million. As of February 24, 1994, Airways International had more than 100 daily flights, 28 small planes in its fleet, and employed 161 people.

== Destinations ==
In 1985, Airways began service to the Bahamas with Convair 580 aircraft.

== Fleet ==
Throughout its history, Airways operated a fleet of Short 330, Convair 580, Cessna 402, Convair 440, and Piper Aztec aircraft. In 1992, the airline added the Short 330 to its fleet and operated. As of 1992, there were 30 aircraft in its fleet.

== See also ==
- List of defunct airlines of the United States
