= Martin 4-0-4 =

Twin-piston-engine US piston airliner, 1950

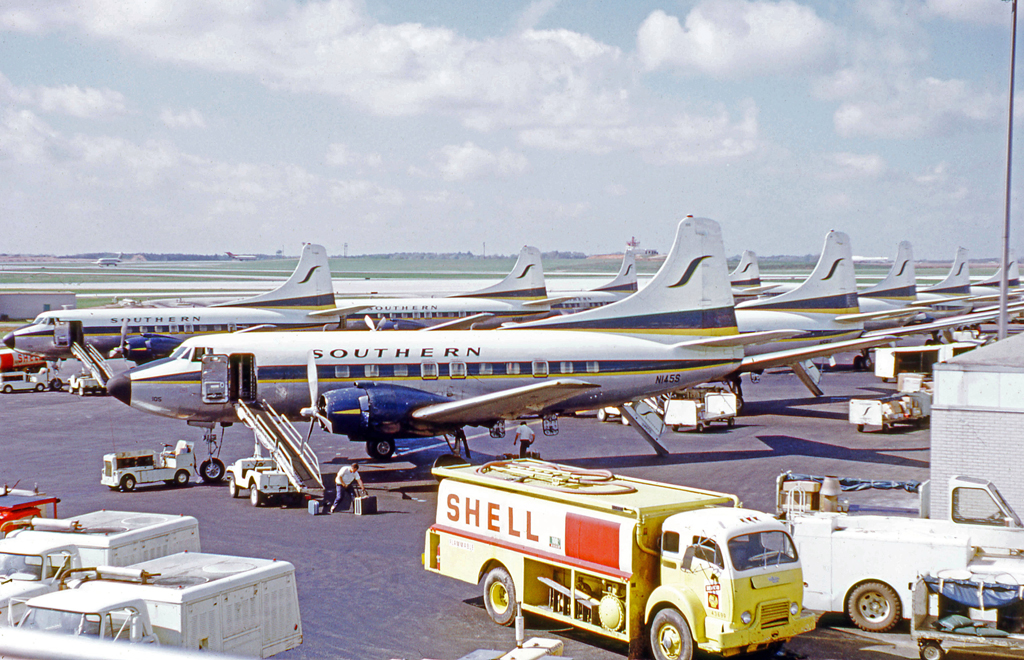
- Nine Martin 404s of Southern Airways at Atlanta Airport in 1972, being prepared for departure on the morning wave of flights

General information
- Type: Short/medium range airliner
- Manufacturer: Glenn L. Martin Company
- Primary users: Eastern Air Lines Trans World Airlines
- Number built: 103

History
- Manufactured: 1951-1953
- Introduction date: 1951
- First flight: October 21, 1950
- Developed from: Martin 2-0-2

The Martin 4-0-4 is a pressurized, all-metal, low-wing 40 passenger American airliner built by the Glenn L. Martin Company and introduced in 1951. Derived from the unpressurized Martin 2-0-2, it is 3 feet longer, powered by the same Pratt & Whitney R-2800 Double Wasp-CB16 18-cylinder radial engine, and slightly slower. In addition to commercial airline use initially in the United States, it was used by the United States Coast Guard and United States Navy as the RM-1G (later as the VC-3A).

== Design and development ==
When production of the earlier Martin 2-0-2 was stopped due to problems with wing structural failure the company decided to re-wing an improved version (which had already flown as the Martin 3-0-3 in 1947). The new aircraft was the Martin 4-0-4. It had structural changes to the wings, pressurization and was lengthened slightly to take 40 passengers. Like the earlier 2-0-2, the 4-0-4 was a cantilever monoplane with a standard tail unit (cantilever tailplane and single vertical stabilizer). It had an airstair in the lower tail section for passenger boarding and disembarkation, retractable tricycle landing gear and was powered by two Pratt & Whitney R-2800-CB16 radial piston engines.

== Operational history ==
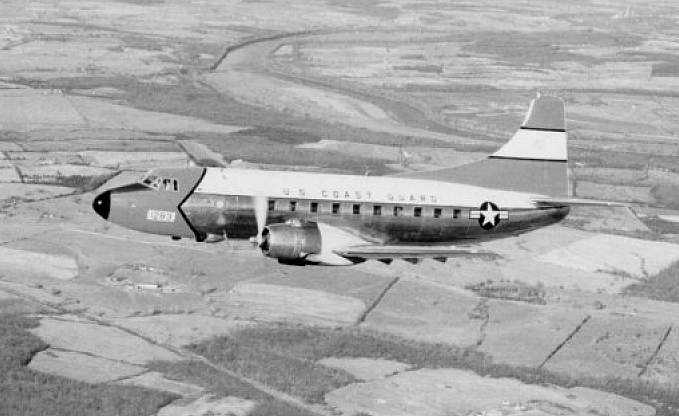
United States Coast Guard RM-1Z/VC-3A

First deliveries in 1951 were made to Eastern Air Lines (EAL), which had ordered 60, and Trans World Airlines (TWA), which had ordered 40. The only other new aircraft from the production line were delivered to the United States Coast Guard which had ordered two as executive transports with the designation RM-1G later changed to RM-1 and then in 1962 to VC-3A. In 1969 they were transferred to the United States Navy and were withdrawn from use by 1970. A total of 103 aircraft were built at the Glenn L. Martin factory in Baltimore.

TWA operated its 40 4-0-4s under the name "Skyliner" on scheduled services between 1 September 1950 and the last flight on 29 April 1961. EAL operated its 4-0-4s in the eastern USA using the class name "Silver Falcon". The first EAL schedule was flown on 5 January 1952 and retirement came in late 1962.

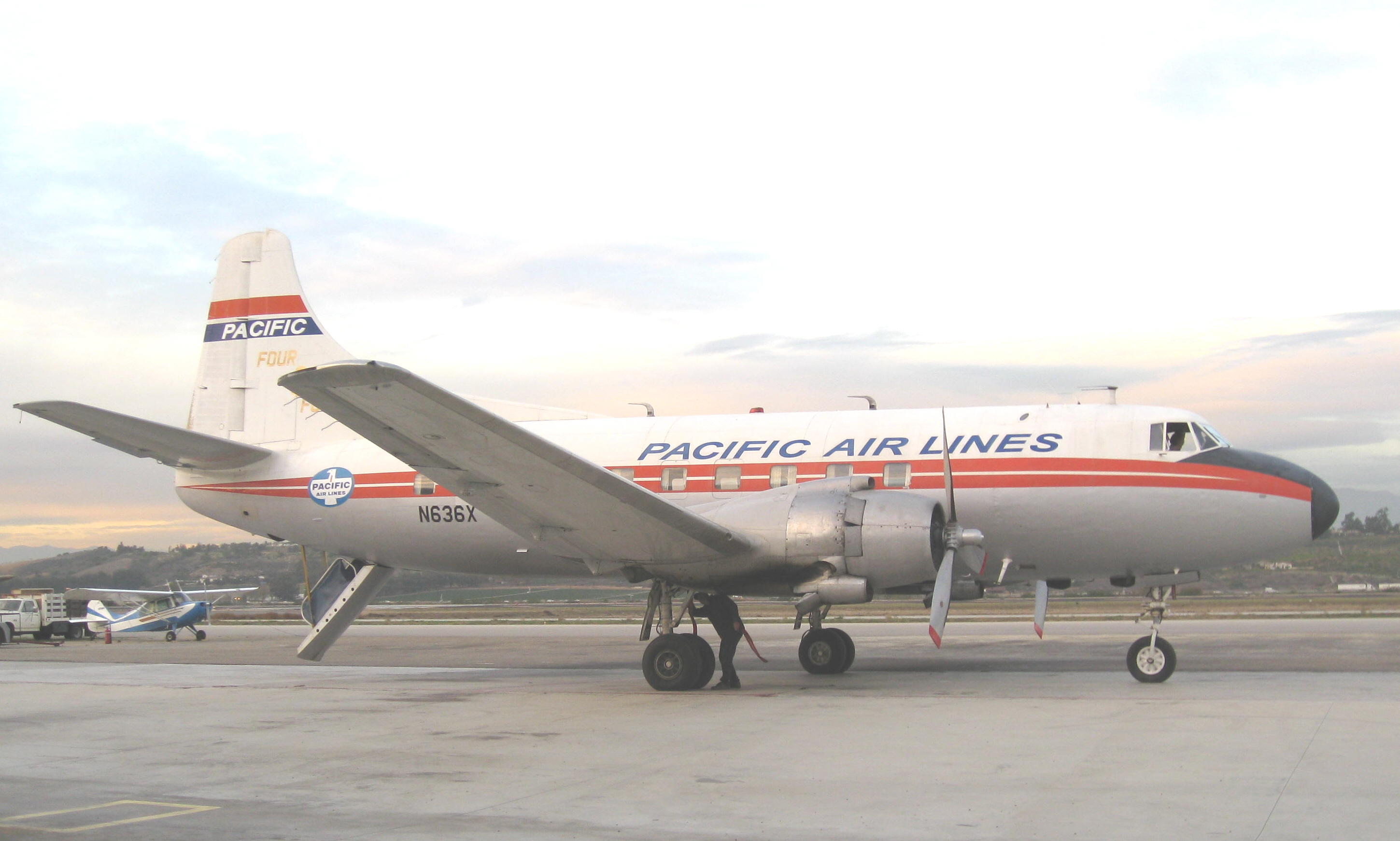
The restored Martin 404 in 2008 at Camarillo Airport wearing Pacific Air Transport markings shortly before its last flight to Valle Airport

Later in their airline career, as they became displaced from the EAL and TWA fleets by turbine-powered aircraft, the 4-0-4s became popular with "second level" operators, known as "local service air carriers" in the U.S. as described and regulated by the federal Civil Aeronautics Board (CAB), with these airlines needing to replace their Douglas DC-3s. One of the last 'major' US airlines with a large fleet of piston-engined airliners was Southern Airways which operated 25 model 4-0-4s on a network of scheduled services from Atlanta in October 1961, all ex-Eastern Airlines aircraft. Southern Airways' last 4-0-4 service was flown on 30 April 1978 with the air carrier then replacing them with smaller Fairchild Swearingen Metroliner "Metro II" turboprops. This was the last piston-engine airliner flight by any major U.S. air carrier. Martin 4-0-4s were also flown by Pacific Air Lines (which subsequently merged with Bonanza Air Lines and West Coast Airlines to form Air West, which was then renamed Hughes Airwest), Piedmont Airlines (which operated former TWA 4-0-4 airliners), Ozark Air Lines and Mohawk Airlines during the 1960s. Most of these planes were replaced in 1968 with Fairchild F-27 and/or Fairchild-Hiller FH-227B turboprop aircraft.

Following their retirement by the aforementioned local service air carriers, a number of 4-0-4s were then operated by several U.S. based commuter and regional airlines including Air South, Atlantic Southeast Airlines (ASA), Florida Airlines, Marco Island Airways, Provincetown-Boston Airlines (PBA) and Southeast Airlines. Martin 4-0-4s were also used in Air Florida Commuter feeder service when Air Florida was operating domestic and international scheduled passenger jet service during the 1970s and 1980s.

In February 2008 the last airworthy 4-0-4, an ex-TWA aircraft, was ferried to the Planes of Fame Museum in Valle, Arizona.

== Operators ==
♠ original operators

=== Civil ===
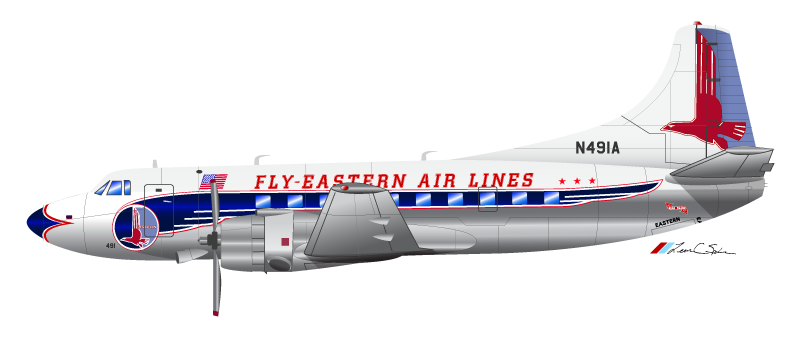
An Eastern Airlines Martin 404 circa 1955

Bolivia
Colombia

- Aero Proveedora Proa Ltda

Dominican Republic

- Dominair
- Santiago Freighters

Haiti
Mexico
Panama
United States

- Air South
- Atlantic Southeast Airlines (1972–1979)
- Eastern Airlines (1951–1962) ♠
- Fiesta-Air
- Florida Airlines (1977–1981)
- Marco Island Airways (1973–1981)
- Mohawk Airlines (1961–1965)
- Ocean Airways (1980)
- Ozark Air Lines (1964–1967)
- Pacific Air Lines (1959–1968)
- Piedmont Airlines (1961–1972)
- Provincetown-Boston Airlines (PBA) (1975–1984)
- Southeast Airlines (1971–1976)
- Southern Airways (1961–1978)
- Trans World Airlines (TWA) (1930–2001) ♠

Venezuela

- Rentavion

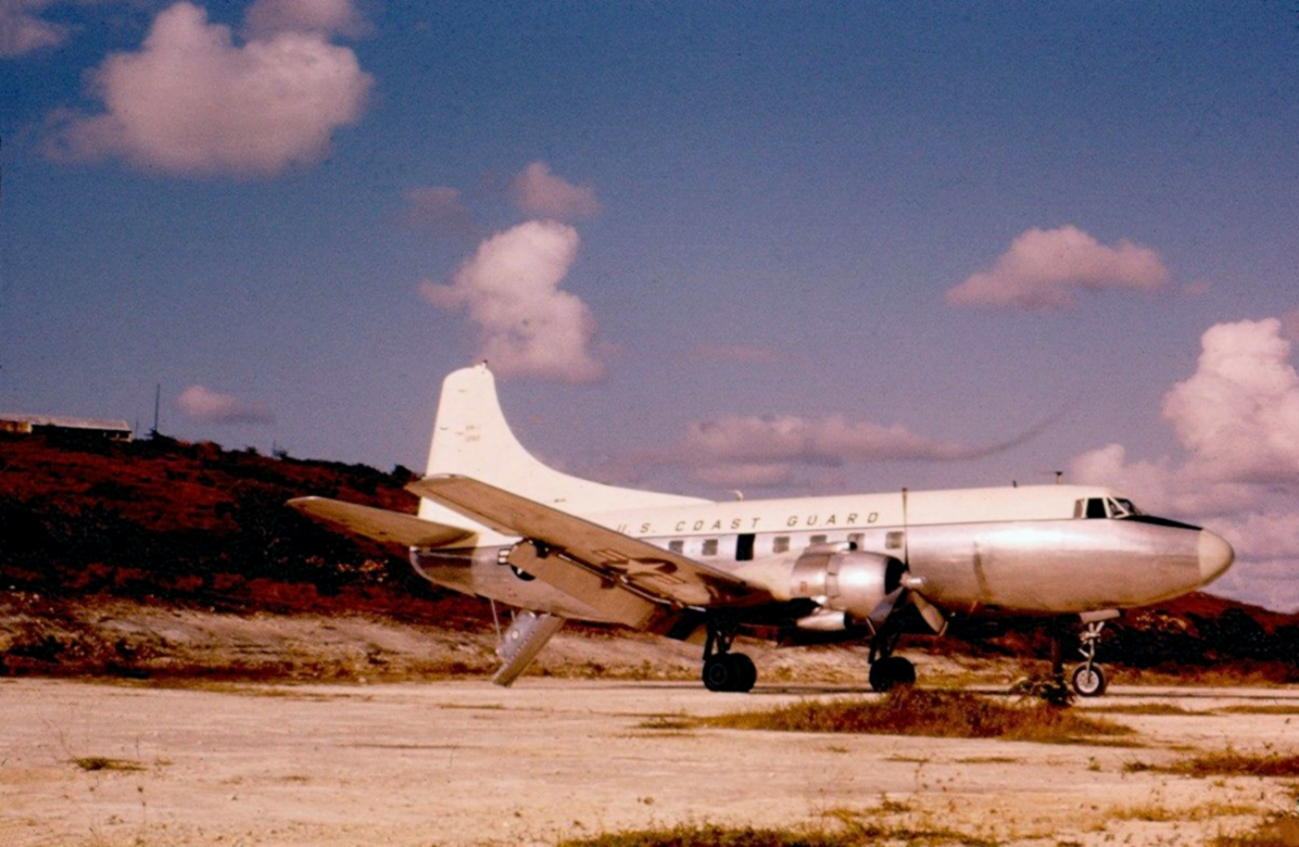
United States Coast Guard RM-1 in 1958

=== Military ===
United States

- United States Coast Guard ♠
- United States Navy

== Notable accidents and incidents ==
- 19 February 1955: TWA Flight 260 crashed into the Sandia Mountains; the three crew and 13 passengers died.
- 1 April 1956: TWA Flight 400 crashed on takeoff from Greater Pittsburgh International Airport; 22 of the 36 people aboard the aircraft died.
- 2 July 1963: Mohawk Airlines Flight 112 crashed during takeoff from Rochester-Monroe airport, seven people died and 36 were injured.
- 30 May 1970: Lehigh Acres Development Inc. Flight 701 crashed near Atlanta, Georgia, moments after departing from DeKalb–Peachtree Airport, striking a car. One passenger aboard the plane and five people in the car died. Thirty passengers aboard the plane were injured.
- 2 October 1970: In the Wichita State University Crash, a charter flight operated by Golden Eagle Aviation crashed near Silver Plume, Colorado; 31 of the 40 people on board died.

== Surviving aircraft ==
- 14119 – Fuselage in storage at Fantasy of Flight in Polk City, Florida. It was previously registered as N40415 and is in former Provincetown–Boston Airlines livery.
- 14135 – Airworthy at the Planes of Fame Air Museum in Valle, Arizona. It is registered as N636X and is in a Pacific Air Lines livery.
- 14141 – On static display at the Mid-Atlantic Air Museum in Reading, Pennsylvania. It was previously registered as N450A and is painted in an Eastern Air Lines livery.
- 14142 – On static display at the National Airline History Museum in Kansas City, Missouri. It was previously registered as N145S.
- 14143 – Cockpit on static display at the National Museum of Commercial Aviation in Forest Park, Georgia. It was previously registered as N9234C.
- 14153 – On static display at the Pima Air & Space Museum in Tucson, Arizona. It was previously registered as N462M.
- 14158 – Stored at Billings Logan International Airport in Billings, Montana. It was previously registered as N974M and is used for fire evacuation training.
- 14227 – Owned by Harold Sheppard Jr. of Riverton, Wyoming. It is registered as N461M.
- 14233 – On static display at the Glenn L. Martin Aviation Museum in Middle River, Maryland. It was previously registered as N259S, but is painted as N40400, the first 4-0-4 prototype.
- 14246 – Stored at the Flying Tigers Airport near Paris, Texas. It was previously registered as N255S.

== Specifications ==
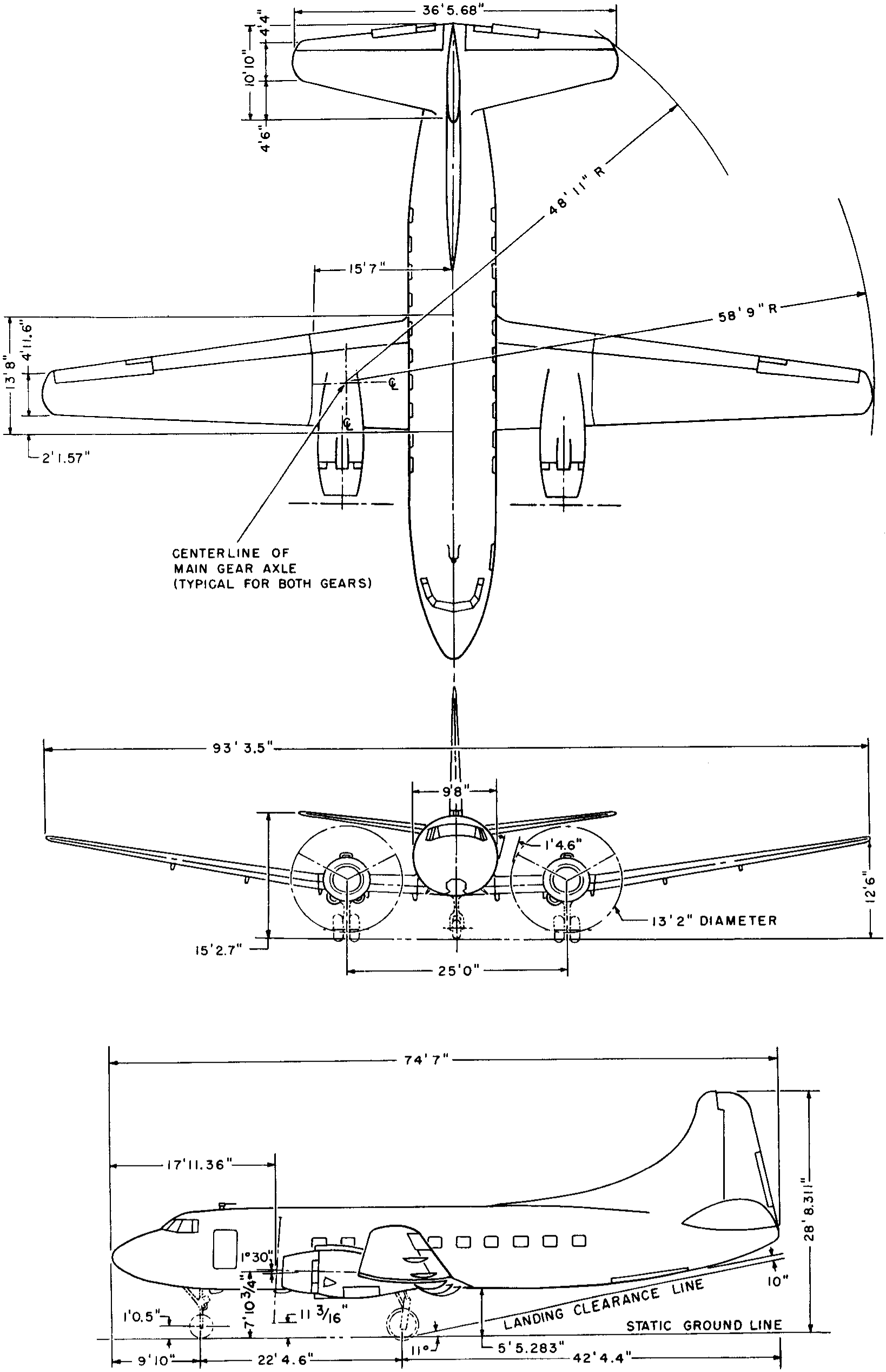
3-view silhouette drawing of the Martin RM-1

Data from Jane's All The World's Aircraft 1953–54

General characteristics

- Crew: 3 or 4
- Capacity: 40 passengers
- Length: 74 ft 7 in (22.73 m)
- Wingspan: 93 ft 3 in (28.42 m)
- Height: 28 ft 5 in (8.66 m)
- Wing area: 864 sq ft (80.3 m^{2})
- Airfoil: GLM-W 16
- Empty weight: 29,126 lb (13,211 kg)
- Max takeoff weight: 44,900 lb (20,366 kg)
- Powerplant: 2 × Pratt & Whitney R-2800 Double Wasp-CB16 18-cylinder two-row air-cooled radial engine, 2,400 hp (1,800 kW) each (take off power), 1,800 hp (1,300 kW) (normal power)
- Propellers: 3-bladed Hamilton Standard 2H17K3-48R, 13 ft 2 in (4.01 m) diameter

Performance

- Maximum speed: 312 mph (502 km/h, 271 kn) at 14,500 ft (4,400 m)
- Cruise speed: 280 mph (450 km/h, 240 kn) at 18,000 ft (5,500 m)
- Stall speed: 81 mph (130 km/h, 70 kn) at sea level
- Range: 1,080 mi (1,740 km, 940 nmi)
- Ferry range: 2,600 mi (4,200 km, 2,300 nmi)
- Service ceiling: 29,000 ft (8,800 m)
- Rate of climb: 1,905 ft/min (9.68 m/s)
- Take-off distance to 50 ft (15 m): 1,980 ft (600 m)
- Landing distance from 50 ft (15 m): 1,750 ft (530 m)

== See also ==
Related development

- Martin 2-0-2

Aircraft of comparable role, configuration, and era

- CASA C-207 Azor
- Convair 240
- Ilyushin Il-14
- Saab 90 Scandia
- Vickers VC.1 Viking

Related lists

- List of military aircraft of the United States
- List of United States Navy aircraft designations (pre-1962)
