= Air Florida Commuter =

US regional feeder air network

IATA	ICAO	Call sign
QH	FLA	PALM
- Founded: September 1979; 46 years ago
- Commenced operations: 1980; 46 years ago
- Ceased operations: 1984; 42 years ago
- Hubs: Miami International Airport
- Parent company: Air Florida
- Headquarters: Miami-Dade County, Florida

Air Florida Commuter was the brand for regional Air Florida feeder network.

== History ==
The brand was established by Air Florida to "feed" the main network from various communities. By September 1981, the airline was one of the fastest growing airlines conglomerate in the United States. By October 1981, the network linked 13 cities with Air Florida's 43 airport stops, linking all airports into one operation. In June 1982, Slocum Airlines was integrated into the Air Florida Commuter system.

== Fleet ==
The Air Florida Commuter fleet consisted of the following aircraft models and quantities:

Aircraft	In service	Passengers	Notes
Beechcraft 99	4	15	Operated by Skyway of Ocala
Britten-Norman Islander	2	10	Operated by Slocum Airlines
Britten-Norman Trislander	1	16	Operated by Slocum Airlines
CASA 212	7	26	Operated by North American Airlines and Gull Air
Cessna 402	21	6	Operated by Gull Air, Pompano Airways and Slocum Airlines
Convair 580	4	40	Operated by Key Airlines
de Havilland Canada DHC-6 Twin Otter	1	20	Operated by Ocean Reef Airways
de Havilland Heron	3	14	Operated by North American Airlines
Embraer EMB-110 Bandeirante	2	18	Operated by Finair Express
Martin 404	12	40	Operated by Florida Airlines and Marco Island Airways
Nord 262	16	29	Operated by National Commuter Airlines and Pompano Airlines
Total	76

== See also ==
- List of defunct airlines of United States
