= Rock Sound International Airport =

Airport in Rock Sound, Bahamas

- IATA: RSD; ICAO: MYER

Summary
- Location: Rock Sound
- Elevation AMSL: 10 ft (3.0 m)
- Coordinates: 24°53′30″N 076°10′40″W

Map
- Location in The Bahamas

Runways
Direction	Length		Surface
Direction	m	ft	Surface
09/27	2,199	7,215	Asphalt
- Source: DAFIF

Rock Sound International Airport (IATA: RSD, ICAO: MYER) is an airport in the South Eleuthera district of The Bahamas. Its name comes from the former district of Rock Sound.

== Airlines and destinations ==
Airlines	Destinations
Bahamasair	George Town, Governor's Harbour, Nassau, North Eleuthera, San Salvador (Bahamas)
Flamingo Air	Bimini, Black Point, Freeport, Great Harbour Cay, Mangrove Cay, Marsh Harbour, Nassau, Staniel Cay
