= Florida Coastal Airlines =

IATA	ICAO	Call sign
PA	FCL	FLORIDA COASTAL
- Founded: 1995; 30 years ago
- Ceased operations: July 2010; 14 years ago
- Hubs: Fort Lauderdale Hollywood International Airport
- Fleet size: 5
- Destinations: 8
- Headquarters: Fort Lauderdale, Florida, United States

Florida Coastal Airlines (FCA) was an airline based in Fort Lauderdale, Florida, USA. It operated services between Florida and the Bahamas, Cuba, and Haiti.

== History ==
The airline was formed in 1995, operating with Cessna 402C aircraft. The small charter airline flew mostly fisherman & boaters to the Abacos and Walker's Cay, both located in the Bahamas; and workers to the tiny island of Salt Cay, just south of Bimini. Once the airline went scheduled, FCA initially flew from the Florida Keys to Ft Lauderdale, augmenting their flights to Marsh Harbour & Treasure Cay, Abaco from Ft. Pierce. The airline eventually tried Sarasota & Stuart, FL - only to have the airport authority in Stuart kick them out.

In 2006, operations ceased, but quickly resumed under new ownership. After flights restarted, the airline dropped their service to destinations within Florida, and operated exclusively to the Bahamas. It has subsequently expanded to serve Cap-Haïtien, Haiti, the Guantanamo Bay Naval Base in Cuba, as well as five destinations in the Bahamas.

== Destinations ==
Florida Coastal Airlines served the following destinations:

- Fort Lauderdale International Airport, Fort Lauderdale, United States (hub)
- Cap-Haitien International Airport, Cap-Haïtien, Haiti
- Congo Town Airport, South Andros, Bahamas
- South Bimini Airport, Bimini, Bahamas
- North Eleuthera Airport, Eleuthera, Bahamas
- Governor's Harbour Airport, Eleuthera, Bahamas
- New Bight Airport, Cat Island, Bahamas
- Guantanamo Bay Naval Base, Cuba

== Former Destinations ==
- Key West International Airport, Key West, United States
- Marathon, Florida
- Marsh Harbour, Abaco, Bahamas
- Salt Cay, Bimini, Bahamas (now Ocean Cay a private island used by MSC Cruises)
- Treasure Cay, Abaco, Bahamas
- Walker's Cay, Grand Bahama Islands, Bahamas

== Fleet ==
Florida Coastal Airline's fleet consisted of the following aircraft (as of May 2010):

- 2 Cessna 402Cs
- 1 Fairchild Swearingen Metro III
- 1 Fairchild Swearingen Metro IIB
- 3 Saab 340As

== See also ==
- List of defunct airlines of the United States
