= GBIA =

GBIA may refer to:

- Grand Bahama International Airport, an international airport in Freeport, Bahamas
- George Bush Intercontinental Airport, an international airport in Houston, Texas, United States
