= Joel Stubbs =

Bahamaian bodybuilder (born 1967)

- professional bodybuilder

Personal info
- Born: 30 December 1967 (age 57) (The Bahamas) Nassau Bahamas

Best statistics
- Height: 6 ft 3 in (191 cm)
- Weight: 300 lb (140 kg)

Professional (Pro) career
- Pro-debut: Southern States - NPC, Super-HeavyWeight; 2000

Joel Stubbs (born 30 December 1967 in Nassau, Bahamas) is a former IFBB professional bodybuilder.

== Biography ==
Stubbs first started studying bodybuilding on his own at age 29 in 1996. In 2000, he competed in the NPC (National Physique Committee) where he placed first. It was not until 2003 when he received his first IFBB pro card during the Central American and Caribbean championships. Stubbs is an airline pilot for Bahamasair, but didn't fly much during the time he spent competing in the IFBB pro-circuit.

Stubbs' most impressive feature is the size of his upper body, notably his incredibly large back. Stubbs however, has underdeveloped legs, due to an injury sustained to his knee during a basketball game. Stubbs is promoted in some advertisements as the World's Biggest Bodybuilder.

Stubbs is the President of the Bahamas Bodybuilding & Fitness Federation (BBFF) since 2015*.

== Stats ==
• Full Name:Joel Stubbs
• Place of Birth:Nassau, Bahamas
• Date of Birth:30 December 1967
• Age:55
• Occupation: IFBB professional bodybuilder, personal trainer/commercial airline pilot
• Height:6'3"
• Contest Weight:300 lbs
• Off-Season Weight:325 lbs
• Eye Color:Brown
• Hair Color:Bald
• Bench Press (1 rep max.): 535 lb
• Deadlift (1 rep max.): 600 lb
• Barbell Curl (1 rep max.): 225 lb
• Squat (1 rep max.): 550 lb

== Competition history ==
2000 Southern States - NPC, Super-HeavyWeight, 1st

2005 Europa Supershow - IFBB, 12th
2006 Atlantic City Pro - IFBB, 12th
2006 Europa Supershow - IFBB,10th
2006 MontrealPro Championships - IFBB, 12th
2007 Europa Supershow - IFBB, Open, 8th
2007 Grand Prix Australia - IFBB, 6th
2007 Ironman Pro Invitational - IFBB, 9th
2007 Montreal Pro Championships - IFBB, 9th
2007 Sacramento Pro Championships - IFBB, 8th
2008 NY PRO - IFBB, Open, 14th
2008 Europa PRO - IFBB, Open, 14th
2008 Atlantic City - IFBB, Open, 5th
2008 Atlantic City - IFBB, Masters, 3rd

2009 Mr. Olympia - IFBB, 16th
