= North Eleuthera Airport =

Airport in North Eleuthera, Bahamas

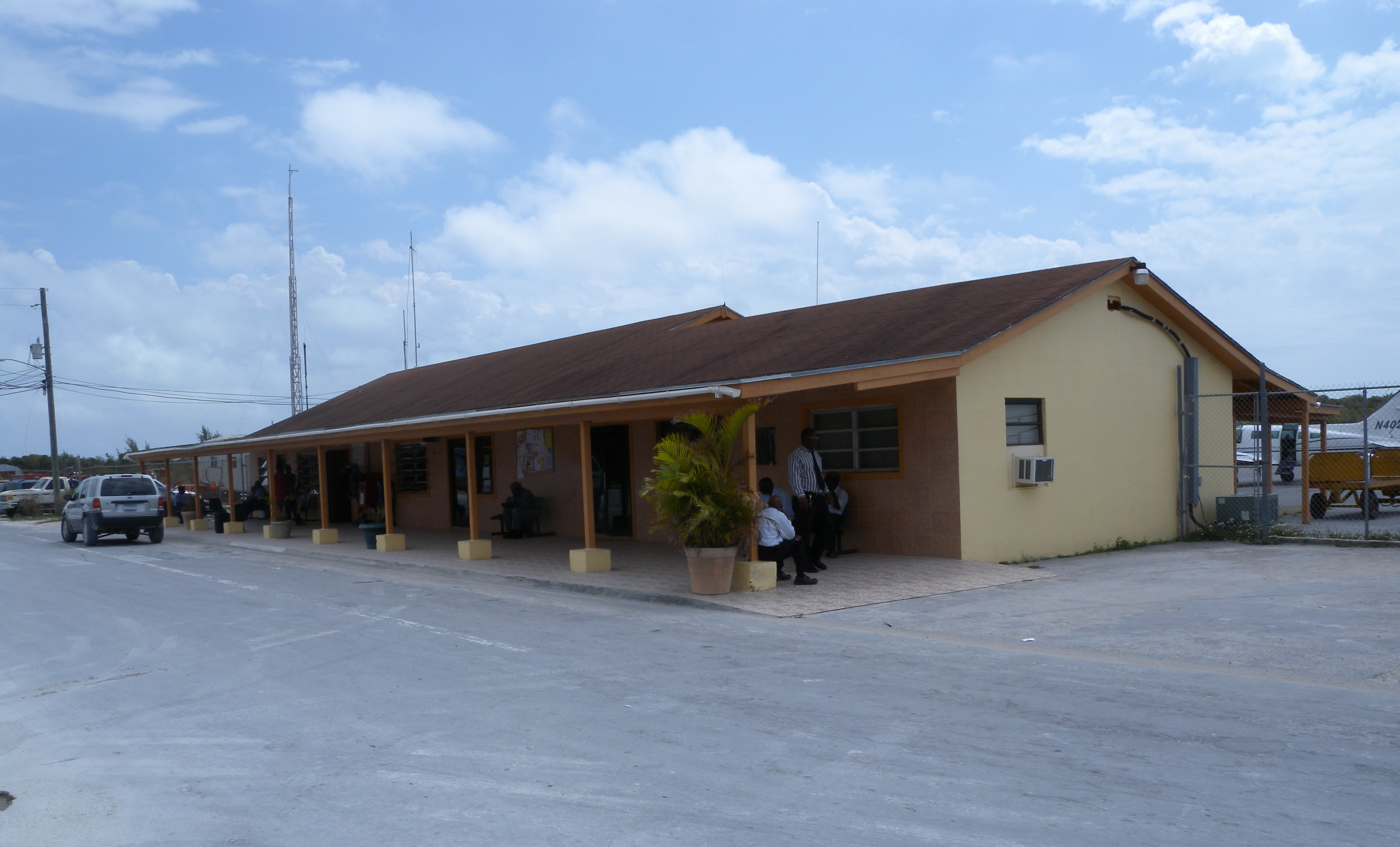
- IATA: ELH; ICAO: MYEH

Summary
- Airport type: Public
- Location: North Eleuthera
- Elevation AMSL: 13 ft (4.0 m)
- Coordinates: 25°28′30″N 076°41′01″W

Map
- Location in The Bahamas

Runways
Direction	Length		Surface
Direction	m	ft	Surface
07/25	1,835	6,020	Asphalt
- Source: DAFIF

North Eleuthera Airport (IATA: ELH, ICAO: MYEH) is a public airport in the North Eleuthera district on the island of Eleuthera in the Bahamas. It serves the outlying islands of Harbour Island and Spanish Wells as well as the northernmost third of Eleuthera Island.

== Airlines and destinations ==
=== Passenger ===
Airlines	Destinations
American Eagle	Miami; Seasonal: Charlotte
Bahamasair	Governor's Harbour, Nassau, Rock Sound; Seasonal: Fort Lauderdale
Delta Connection	Seasonal: Atlanta
Pineapple Air	Governor's Harbour, Nassau
Southern Air Charter	Nassau
