= Diamond Cay (Bahamas) =

Island in the Bahamas

- Location within Bahamas

Geography
- Location: Atlantic Ocean
- Coordinates: 25°24′N 77°53′W
- Type: Cay
- Archipelago: Lucayan Archipelago

Administration
- Bahamas

Diamond Cay is an island in the Bahamas. It is located in the south Berry Islands region of the Bahamas, and is within the South Berry Islands Marine Reserve.
