= Port Nelson Airport =

Airport in Rum Cay, Bahamas

Port Nelson Airport New Port Nelson Airport
- IATA: RCY; ICAO: MYRP

Summary
- Airport type: Public
- Serves: Rum Cay, Bahamas
- Location: Port Nelson
- Elevation AMSL: 15 ft (4.6 m)
- Coordinates: 23°41′04″N 074°50′10″W

Map
- Location in The Bahamas

Runways
Direction	Length		Surface
Direction	m	ft	Surface
09/27	1,372	4,501	Asphalt
- Source: DAFIF

Port Nelson Airport or New Port Nelson Airport (IATA: RCY, ICAO: MYRP) is an airport located near Port Nelson, on Rum Cay in The Bahamas.

== Facilities ==
The airport resides at an elevation of 15 ft (4.6 m) above mean sea level. It has one runway designated 09/27 with an asphalt surface measuring 1,372 m × 30 m (4,501 ft × 98 ft).

== Airlines and destinations ==
Airlines	Destinations
Southern Air Charter	Nassau
