= Flamingo Air =

Bahamian airline

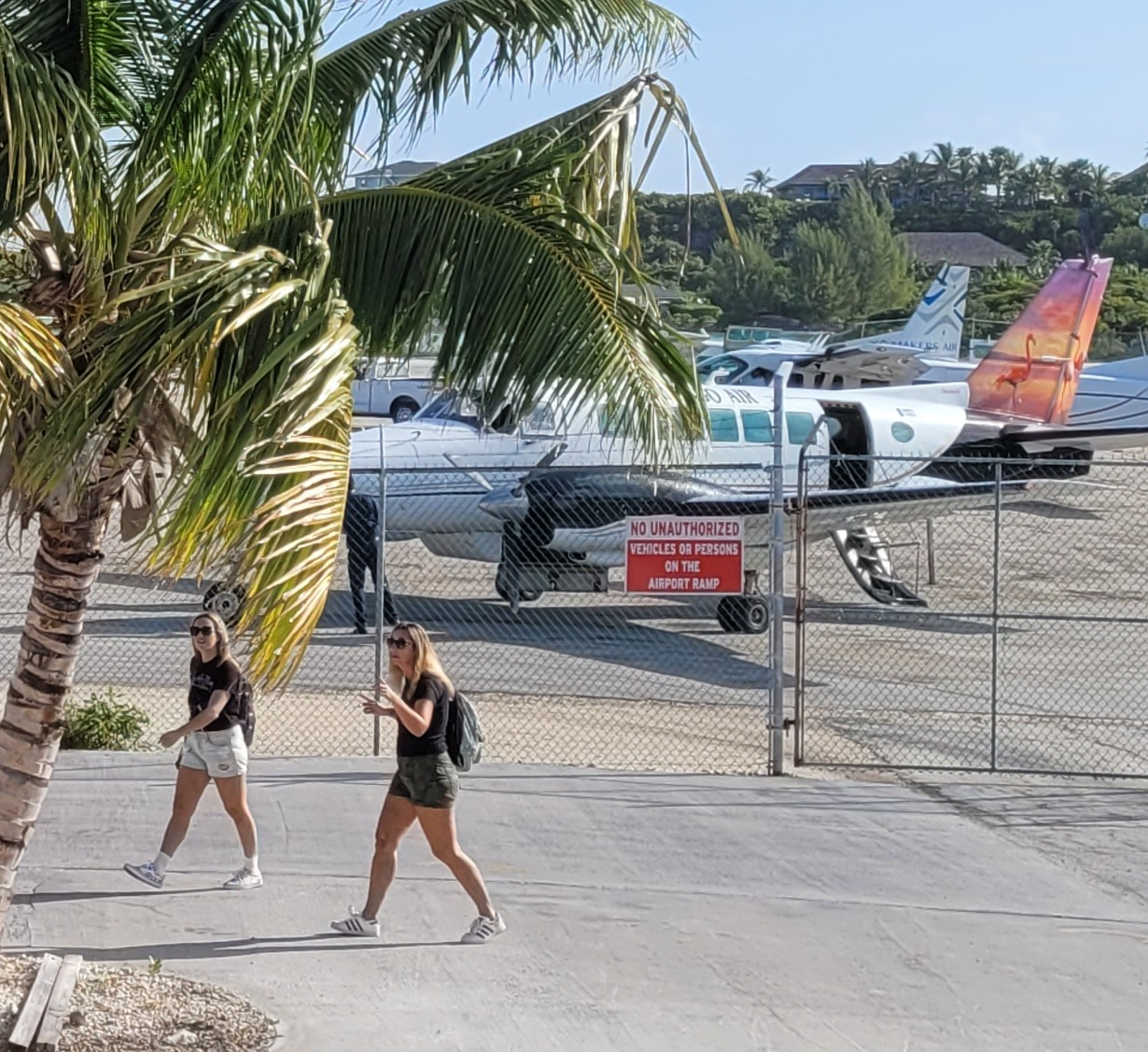
- Airplane at Staniel Cay Airport
IATA	ICAO	Call sign
—	FMR	FLAMINGO AIR
- Commenced operations: 1995
- Operating bases: Grand Bahama International Airport; Lynden Pindling International Airport
- Fleet size: 7
- Destinations: 9
- Headquarters: Bahamas
- Website: flamingoairbah.com

Flamingo Air is a small airline in the Bahamas. Its base of operations is the Grand Bahama International Airport in Freeport. It also has offices in Marsh Harbour Abaco Airport, in Bimini International Airport, and in the Lynden Pindling International Airport, Nassau. It provides scheduled service to several islands, as well as Air Charter service to the Bahamas and south Florida.

Another airline that was based in the Bahamas with a similar name was Flamingo Airlines which operated scheduled passenger service during the early 1970s with British Aircraft Corporation BAC One-Eleven jet aircraft, Convair 340, Lockheed L-188, and Douglas DC-3 prop aircraft from its base in Nassau. Flamingo Air/s air operator certificate has been suspended following the July 10, 2026 incidents, and the airline is now currently undergoing investigation by the Bahamian Ministry of Transport. The Civil Aviation Authority of the Bahamas (CAAB) has temporarily suspended Flamingo Air's AOC, not a complete cease of operations.

== Fleet ==
Flamingo Air fleet
Aircraft	Total	Damaged	Passengers
Cessna 402C Utiliner/Businessliner	2	0	9
Beechcraft Model 99	4 (as of August 2025)	2	15
de Havilland Canada DHC-6-300 Twin Otter	1 (as of August 2025)	0	19

== Destinations ==
- Freeport Airport
- Marsh Harbour Airport
- Freeport to South Bimini Airport
- Nassau to Staniel Cay Airport
- Nassau to Black Point Airport
- Nassau to Great Harbour Cay Airport
- Nassau to Farmers Cay Airport
- Nassau to Clarence A. Bain Airport
- Nassau to Eleuthera

== Accidents and incidents ==
- 31 July 2012 - Piper Aztec experienced mechanical problem departing Freeport.
- 18 August 2012 - Cessna 402C hit trees while attempting to abort a landing in heavy rain.
- 4 October 2013 - Cessna 402 landing gear collapsed during landing at Mayaguana on a charter flight.
- 16 August 2016 - Beech 99 A Flamingo Air plane crash landed at the airport in South Bimini on Monday afternoon after the wheel under the right wing collapsed.
- 3 June 2016 - Beech 99 landing gear failed during landing at Staniel Cay.
- 12 June 2020 - Beech 99 Nose Landing Gear collapsed during landing at Lynden Pindling International Airport.
- 17 October 2022 - Beech 99 Left landing gear failed during landing at Black Point.
- 2 October 2023 - Beech 99 Boarding door opened mid flight en route to Staniel Cay.
- 10 July 2026 - A Beech 99 returned to Lynden Pindling International Airport whilst en route to Mayaguana due to an unknown concern, which was likely an engine fire.
- 10 July 2026 - A Cessna 402C crashed in North Andros, killing all nine passengers and the pilot, becoming the deadliest aviation accident in Bahamas domestic aviation.
