= Mayaguana Airport =

- IATA: MYG; ICAO: MYMM

Summary
- Location: Mayaguana
- Elevation AMSL: 11 ft (3.4 m)
- Coordinates: 22°22′46″N 073°00′49″W

Map
- Location in The Bahamas

Runways
Direction	Length		Surface
Direction	m	ft	Surface
06/24	2,224	7,297	Asphalt
- Source: DAFIF

Mayaguana Airport (IATA: MYG, ICAO: MYMM) is an airport in Mayaguana in the Bahamas.

== Airlines and destinations ==
Airlines	Destinations
Bahamasair	Nassau, Inagua
