= Myles Munroe =

Bahamian Evangelical Christian minister

Dr. Myles Munroe
- Born: 20 April 1954; Nassau, Bahamas
- Died: 9 November 2014 (aged 60); Grand Bahama, Bahamas
- Occupations: Philosopher, Author, lecturer, teacher, leadership mentor, life coach, business & government consultant
- Writing career
- Genre: Inspirational / motivational speaker
- Website: www.munroeglobal.com

Myles Munroe, OBE (20 April 1954 – 9 November 2014) was a Bahamian teacher and ordained minister, professor, author, speaker and leadership consultant. He founded and led the Bahamas Faith Ministries International (BFMI), and Myles Munroe International (MMI). He was also the chief executive officer and chairman of the board of the International Third World Leaders Association, and president of the International Leadership Training Institute. Dr Munroe was a prolific author as well.

Munroe and his wife died in a plane crash on November 9, 2014. Bahamian officials stated their aircraft struck a crane at a ship yard near Grand Bahama International Airport. Munroe and the other passengers were heading to Grand Bahama for a conference.

== Biography ==
=== Early life and education ===
Born Myles Egbert Munroe in 1954 in Nassau, Bahamas, Munroe grew up poor in a family of eleven children. Raised in the Nassau constituency of Bain Town, he was a lifelong resident of the Commonwealth. Munroe was born a Christian, both his parents were evangelists; he later attended Oral Roberts University (ORU) where he received his Bachelor of Fine Arts, Education, and Theology in 1978 and a Master's degree in administration from the University of Tulsa in 1980. Munroe was also the recipient of honorary doctoral degrees from various schools of higher education and served as an adjunct professor of the Graduate School of Theology at ORU. He wrote a number of books, and his first book titled "The Principle and Power of Kingdom Citizenship: Keys to Experiencing Heaven on Earth" and it was published in 1992.

=== Personal life ===
His wife, Ruth Munroe, served as co-pastor with him at BFMI. They got married in 1978. Together, the couple had two children, Myles, Jr. (known as Chairo), and a daughter, Charisa.

=== Christian ministry ===
Following his graduation from the University of Tulsa, Munroe founded Bahamas Faith Ministries International in the early 1980s.

=== Death ===
Munroe and his wife died in a private plane crash during airport approach on 9 November 2014. Bahamian officials stated their aircraft struck a crane at a ship yard near Grand Bahama International Airport. Munroe and the other passengers were on route to Freeport, Grand Baham, for a conference.

== Awards and honours ==
- 1998: OBE for "services to religion" [9]
- 1998: Bahamian "Silver Jubilee Award" for service to the Bahamas in the area of "spiritual, social and religious development"
- 2004: "Alumnus of the Year", Oral Roberts University [11]

== Bibliography ==
Munroe was the author and coauthor of numerous books (with over 16 best sellers to his credit, translated in English, Spanish and Portuguese) and Biblical-related study guides as well as a featured speaker on motivational and Bible-study recordings.

- "Single, Married, Separated, and Life After Divorced"
- "Understanding the Purpose and Power of Men"
- "Understanding the Purpose and Power of a Woman"
- "The Most Important Person on Earth"
- "Purpose and Power of Love in Marriage"
- "The Fatherhood Principle"
- "Myles Munroe on Relationship"
- "The Power of Freedom"
- "Waiting and not Dating"
- "Kingdom Parenting"
- "God's Big Idea"
- "Rediscovering the Kingdom"
- "Kingdom Principles: Preparing for Kingdom Experience and Expansion"
- "Applying the Notion: Rediscovering the Priority of God for Mankind"
- "Understanding the Purpose and Power of Prayer: How to Call Heaven to Earth"
- "Rediscovering Faith"
- "Purpose and Power of Praise and Worship"
- "Rediscovering Kingdom Worship"
- "Understanding Your Potential"
- "Uncover Your Potential: You are More than You Realize"
- "Releasing Your Potential: Exposing the Hidden You"
- "Maximizing Your Potential"
- "The Pursuit of Purpose"
- "Unfit For Purpose"
- "Becoming a Father"
- "The Spirit of Leadership"
- "The Principles and Power of Vision"
- "Principles and Benefits of Change"
- "In Charge"
- "Overcoming Crisis"
- "The Glory of Living: Keys to Releasing Your Personal Glory"
- "Purpose And Power Of Authority"
- "Power Of Character In Leadership: How Values, Morals, Ethics, and Principles Affect Leaders"
- "Kingdom Citizenship"
- "Passing It On"
