= Bahamasair =

Flag carrier of the Bahamas

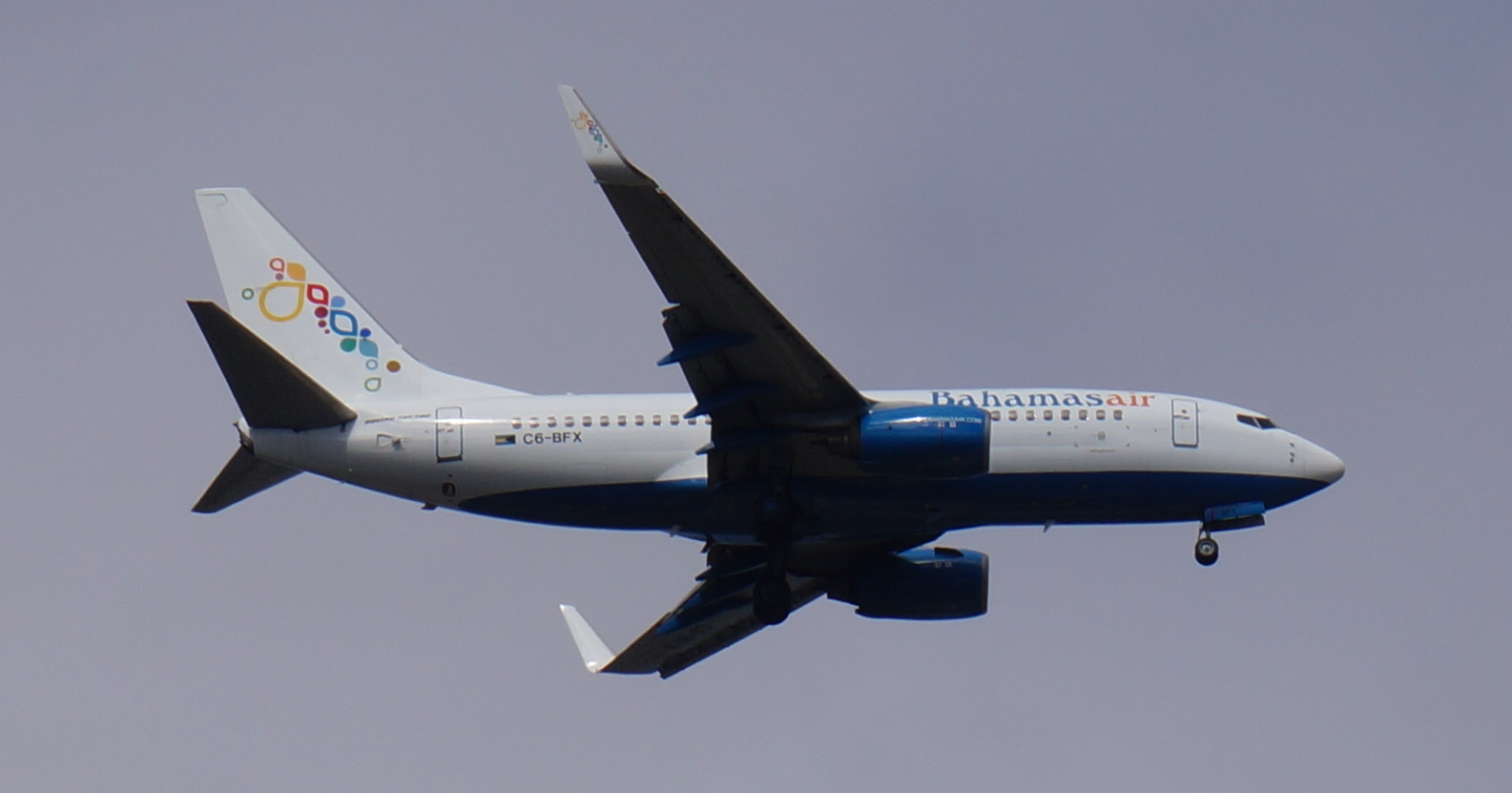
- Bahamasair Boeing 737-700
IATA	ICAO	Call sign
UP	BHS	BAHAMAS
- Founded: 1973
- Commenced operations: 17 June 1973; 53 years ago
- Hubs: Lynden Pindling International Airport
- Frequent-flyer program: Bahamasair Flyer
- Fleet size: 10
- Destinations: 20
- Parent company: Bahamian Government
- Headquarters: Nassau, Bahamas
- Key people: Tracy Cooper, Managing Director
- Website: www.bahamasair.com

Bahamasair Holdings Limited, operating as Bahamasair (stylised: bahamasaır), is the flag carrier of The Bahamas. Headquartered in Nassau, the capital of the Bahamas, the airline operates scheduled services to 32 domestic and regional destinations in the Caribbean and the United States from its base at Lynden Pindling International Airport.

== History ==
=== Early years ===
Bahamasair was established by the Bahamas Government and started operations on 17 June 1973 by acquiring the routes of Flamingo Airlines and the operations and routes of Out Island Airways (OIA). During the early 1970s, both Flamingo Airlines and Out Island Airways were operating scheduled passenger services, Flamingo with British Aircraft Corporation BAC One-Eleven jets, Lockheed L-188 Electra turboprops and Convair 340 and Douglas DC-3 prop aircraft while Out Island was operating Fairchild Hiller FH-227 and de Havilland Canada DHC-6 Twin Otter turboprops. Out Island later operated the BAC One-Eleven jet as well.

The first Bahamasair flight was to Andros Island and the second to Freeport, Grand Bahama. The Bahamas Government purchased 51% of OIA and became the majority shareholder and part owner, then renamed the airline Bahamasair. The other owners were Edward Albury, Gil Hensler and Sherlock Hackley who had 49%. After a few years the Government had purchased the shares of Gil Hensler and Sherlock Hackley. The only Bahamian owner of OIA still maintaining some shares was Edward Albury.

Bahamasair initially encountered operating difficulties, including poor maintenance facilities, economic conditions and company structure. Those factors brought public distrust as a consequential added problem. However, jet airliners started to arrive in the shape of new BAC One-Eleven twin jets including the stretched series 500 model, followed by one brand new Boeing 737-200, and in 1973, it opened its first service to the US, from Nassau to Tampa, Florida.

Also in 1973, the government's vision of several airlines discontinuing service to Nassau became a reality, when US carrier Pan American World Airways as well as other airlines decided to stop operating to the Bahamas. This enabled Bahamasair to capture a substantial part of the Bahamas scheduled air transport market.

Through the rest of the 1970s, Bahamasair kept adding flights to other cities in Florida and, domestically, the presence of the airline also grew rapidly. According to the February 1, 1976 Official Airline Guide (OAG), interisland flights were operated with Fairchild Hiller FH-227 and STOL capable de Havilland Canada DHC-6 Twin Otter turboprops and also with one Douglas DC-3 prop aircraft. This same OAG also lists four daily round trip flights between Nassau and Freeport operated by Bahamasair with BAC One-Eleven twin jets.

=== 1980s ===
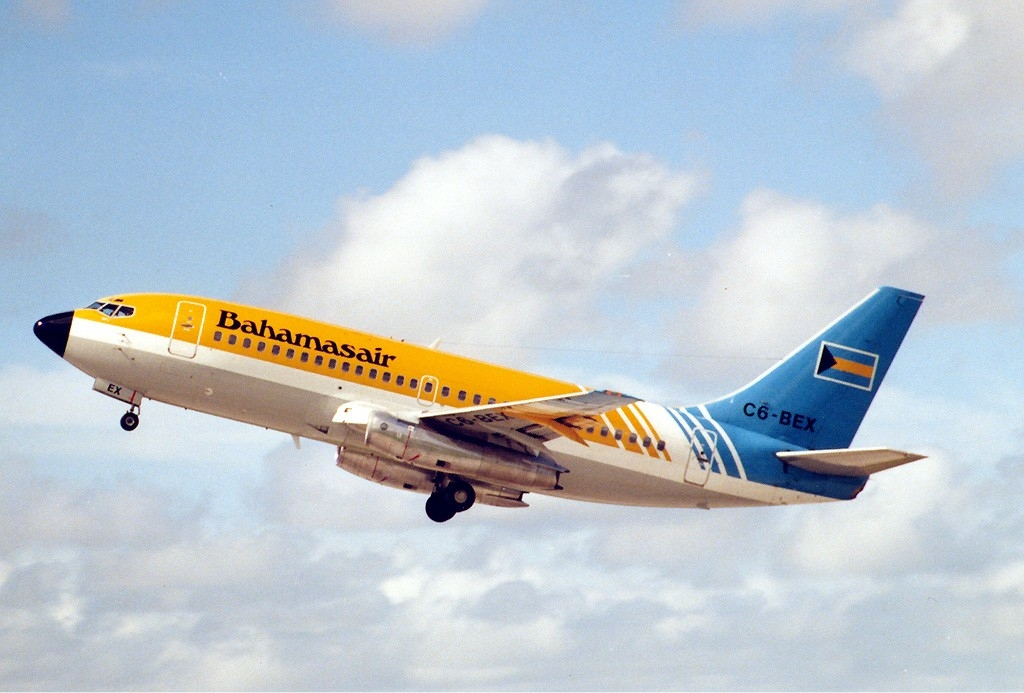
A now-retired Bahamasair Boeing 737-200, 1989

During the early 1980s, Bahamasair unsuccessfully tried to expand to the Northeast United States, opening flights to Philadelphia, Washington, D.C., and Newark, New Jersey. But in 1989, the airline's directors decided that those routes were not profitable and eliminated them from the airline's schedule. Also in 1989, the first of two Boeing 727-200s came into the fleet. That was also the year that a new livery and workers' uniform were introduced. The Boeing 727s, however, could not be kept in service long because of political favors and interference, thereby causing the company to lose vast sums of money in the late 1980s and early 1990s.

=== 1990s ===
In 1991, de Havilland Canada Dash 8 turboprop aircraft were purchased to replace the whole jet fleet and the Boeing 737-200s were taken out of service. According to the September 15, 1994 Official Airline Guide (OAG), most flights were being operated with Dash 8 turboprops although Short 360 turboprops and Cessna 402 prop aircraft were being operated in scheduled service as well. The Dash 8 was being flown on all scheduled services between the Bahamas and Florida at this time according to this OAG. In 1997, the Boeing 737s returned to service because key routes warranted the cargo and passenger carrying capabilities offered by these jetliners. The 737-200 was deployed to Fort Lauderdale, Miami and Orlando as well as one domestic route, being Nassau-Freeport.

=== Development since the 2000s ===
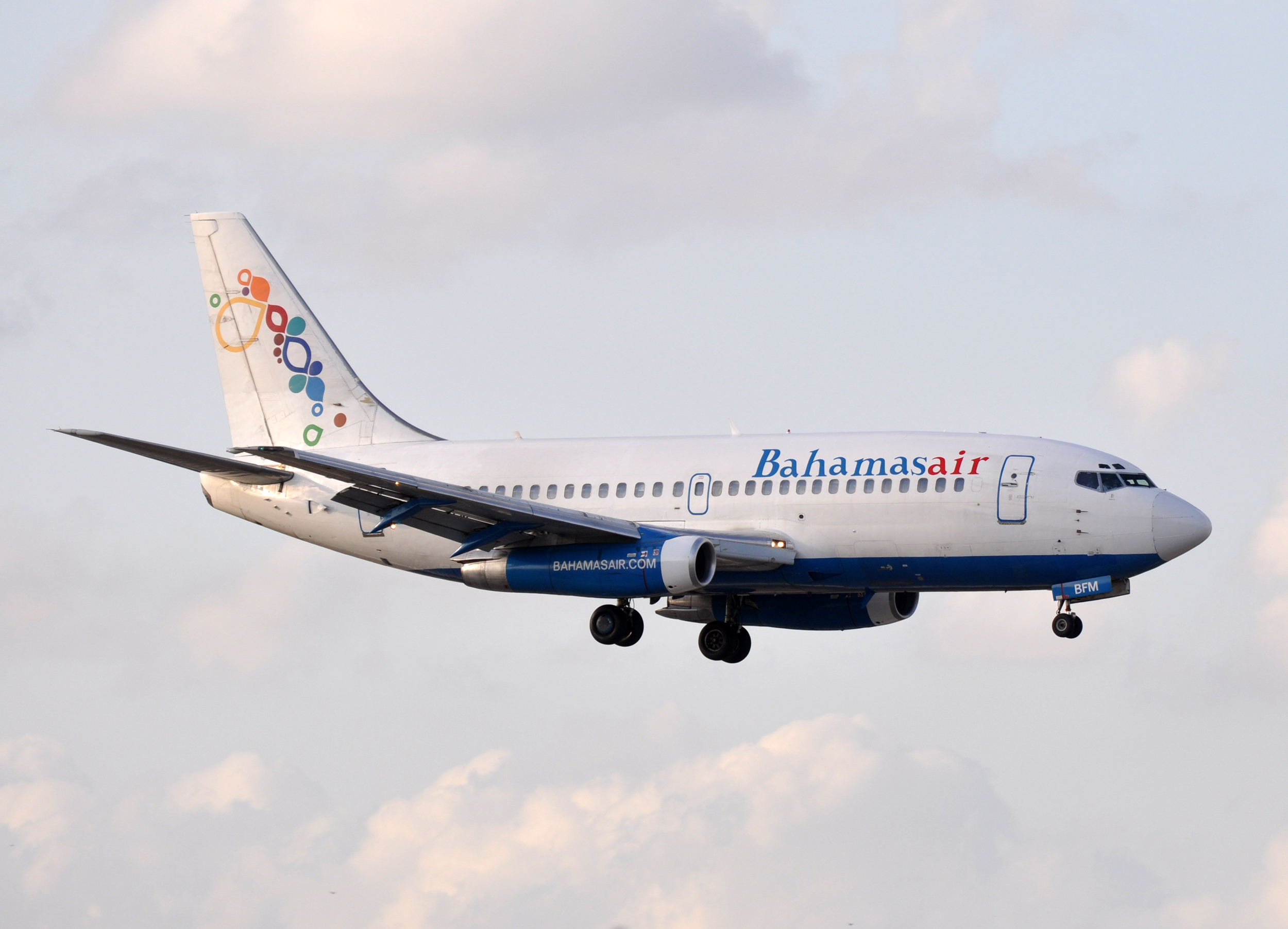
A former Bahamasair Boeing 737-200 in 2012

In November 2011, the government discussed plans to replace the Bahamasair Boeing 737-200s with more fuel efficient and cost effective aircraft. However, it was said that pre-owned Boeing 737-500s may serve as a replacement for the then current jet fleet. In 2012, Bahamasair confirmed it would be taking delivery of two Boeing 737-500s with a 120-passenger all-economy class layout. The first aircraft was delivered on 30 March 2012 and put into service in April 2012. The second 737-500 was delivered on 21 June 2012. Bahamasair retired its last two Boeing 737-200s in September 2012 and received a third Boeing 737-500 in March 2014.

In May 2015, it was reported that the loss-making airline was in a phase of restructuring to gain profitability as advised by the government. This included new union agreements as well as a planned renewal of the ageing fleet. Shortly after, Bahamasair ordered five new ATR 42 and ATR 72 aircraft to replace all of its Bombardier Dash 8s.

The airline took delivery of the first ATR 72–600 on 27 November 2015.

=== Codeshare and interline agreements ===
Bahamasair has a codeshare agreement with Alaska Airlines and Interline agreements with Condor and Hahn Air.

== Fleet ==
=== Current fleet ===
As of August 2025, Bahamasair operates the following aircraft:

Bahamasair fleet
Aircraft	In service	Orders	Passengers	Notes
ATR 42-600	3	—	50	
ATR 72-600	3		70	
Boeing 737-700	4	—	138	
Total	10	—		

=== Historic fleet ===
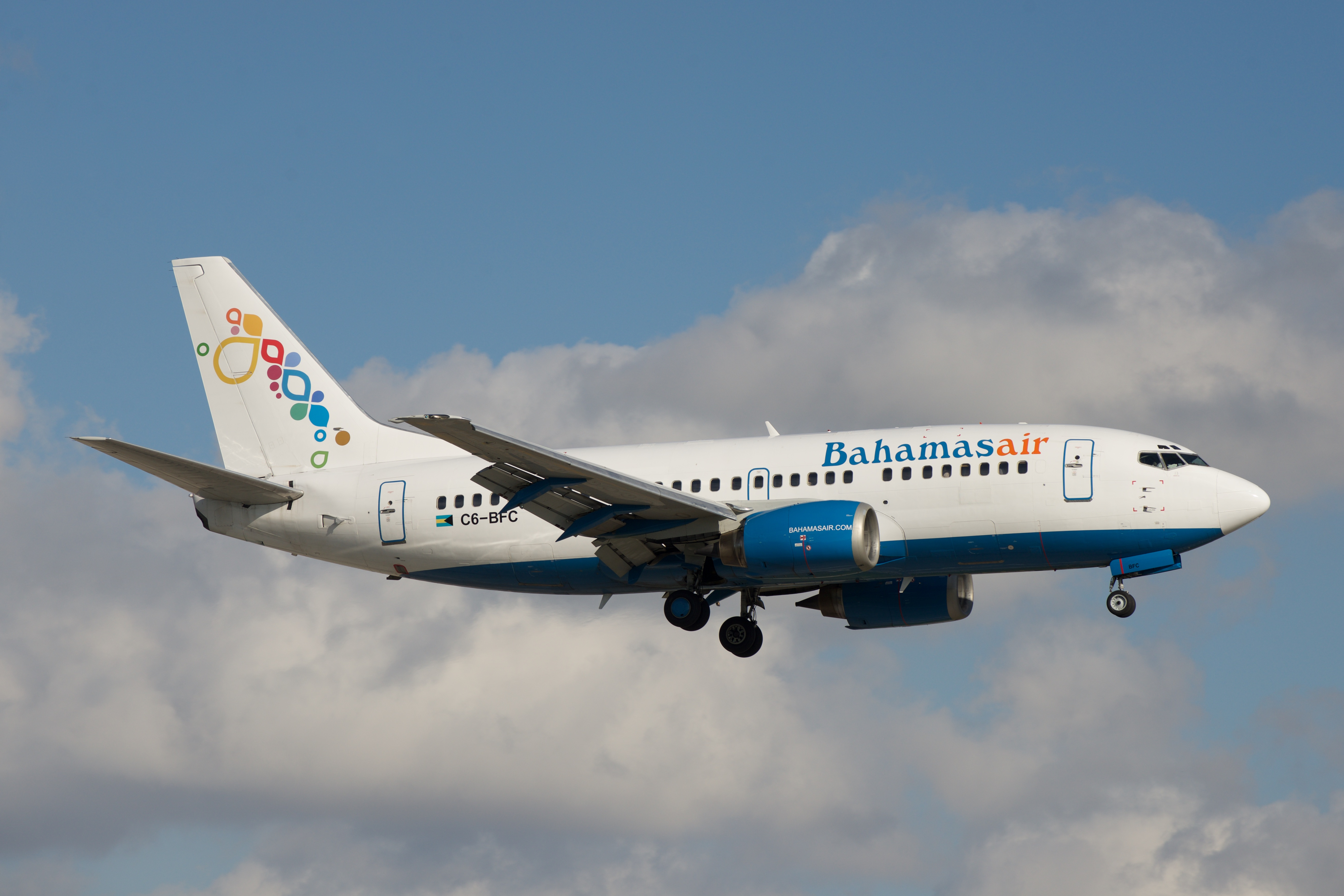
A former Bahamasair Boeing 737-500

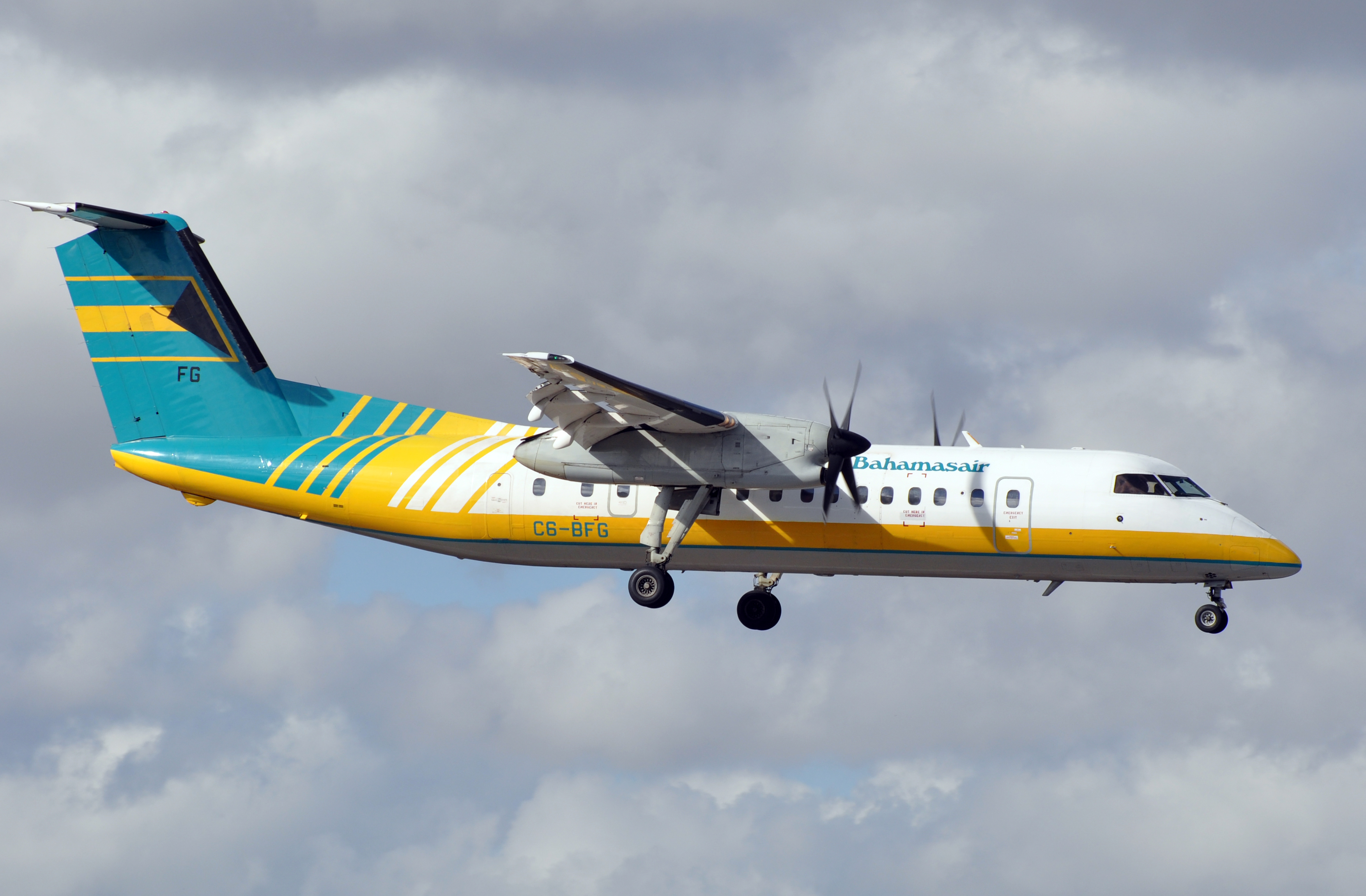
A former Bombardier Dash 8–300 in the older livery introduced in the mid-1980s

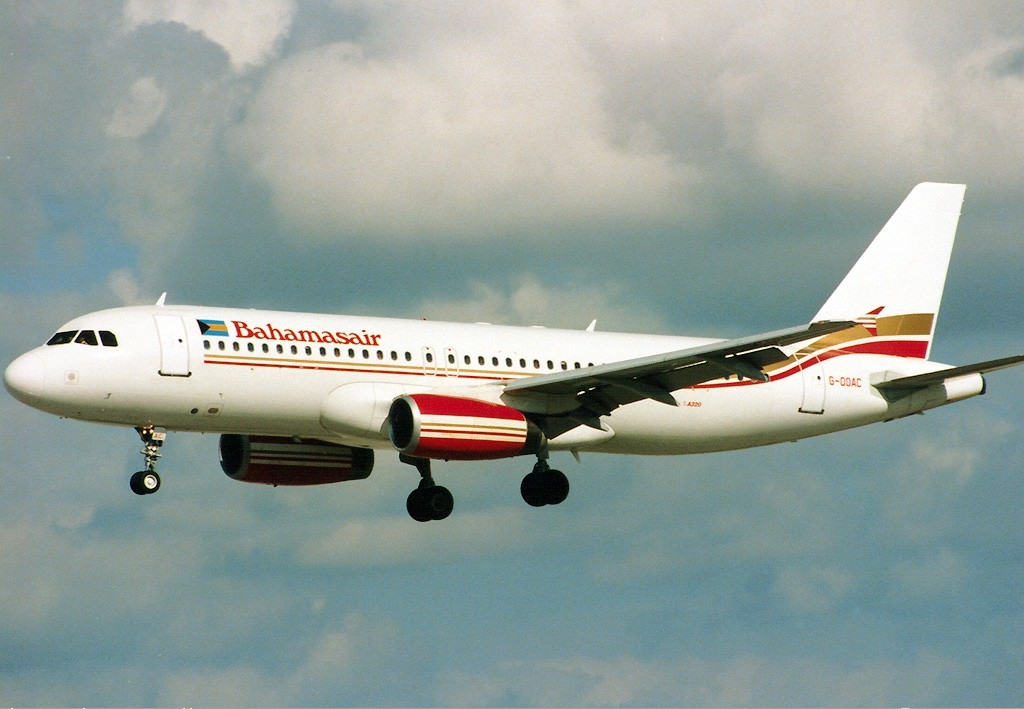
A former Bahamasair Airbus A320, that was leased from Air 2000

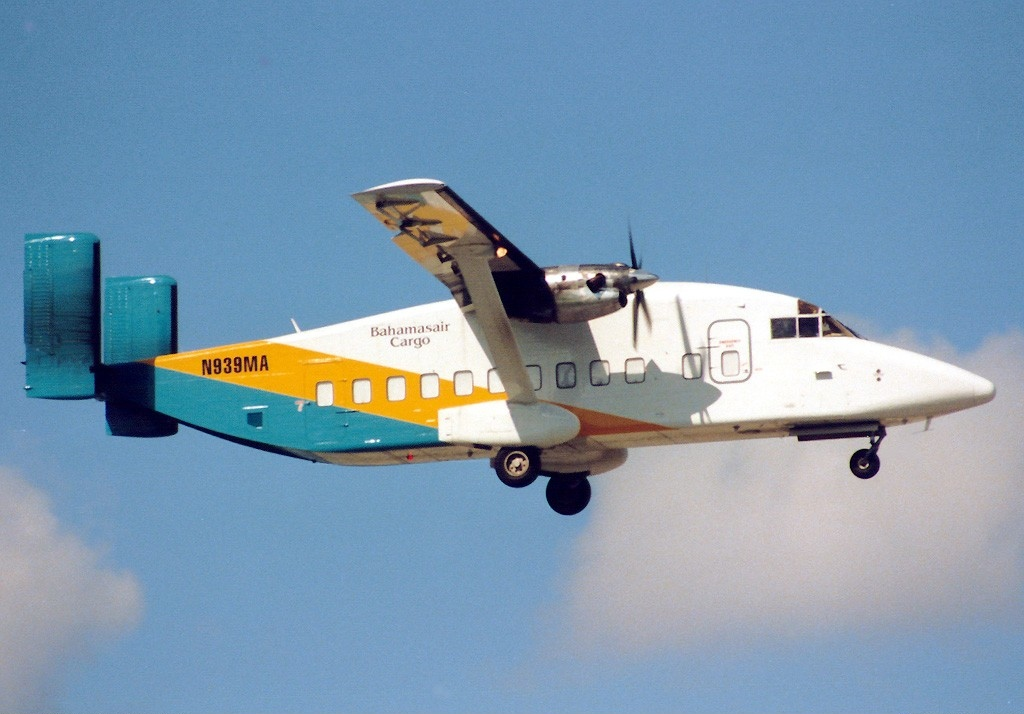
A former Bahamasair Short 330

Bahamasair historic fleet
Aircraft	Total	Notes
Airbus A320-200	1	
BAC One-Eleven (series 400 and 500 aircraft)	4	
Boeing 727-200	2	
Boeing 737-300	1	
Boeing 737-400	1	
Boeing 737-500	3	
Bombardier Dash 8-300	7	5 Replaced by the ATR order / 2 written off
de Havilland Canada DHC-6 Twin Otter	3	
Fairchild Hiller FH-227	4	
Hawker Siddeley HS 748	4	
Short 330	1	Cargo only
Short 360	2	
Aero Commander 500S Shrike Commander	4	
Cessna 402C	3	

== Destinations ==
Departure Country, City	Departure/Hub (IATA)	Destination Country, City	Destination/Arrival (IATA)	Aircraft	Interval
The Bahamas, Nassau	Lynden Pindling International Airport (NAS)	United States, Orlando	Orlando International Airport (MCO)		
The Bahamas, Nassau	Lynden Pindling International Airport (NAS)	United States, Fort Lauderdale	Fort Lauderdale Hollywood International Airport (FLL)		
The Bahamas, Nassau	Lynden Pindling International Airport (NAS)	United States, Miami	Miami International Airport (MIA)		
The Bahamas, Nassau	Lynden Pindling International Airport (NAS)	Cuba, Havana	Jose Marti International Airport (HAV)		
The Bahamas, Nassau	Lynden Pindling International Airport (NAS)	The Bahamas, Freeport	Grand Bahama International Airport (FPO)		
The Bahamas, Nassau	Lynden Pindling International Airport (NAS)	The Bahamas, Bullock Harbour	Great Harbour Cay Airport (GHC)		
The Bahamas, Nassau	Lynden Pindling International Airport (NAS)	The Bahamas, Marsh Harbour	Marsh Harbour Airport (MHH)		
The Bahamas, Nassau	Lynden Pindling International Airport (NAS)	The Bahamas, North Eleuthera	North Eleuthera Airport (ELH)		
The Bahamas, Nassau	Lynden Pindling International Airport (NAS)	The Bahamas, Governor's Harbour	Governor's Harbour Airport (GHB)		
The Bahamas, Nassau	Lynden Pindling International Airport (NAS)	The Bahamas, Rock Sound	Rock Sound Airport (RSD)		
The Bahamas, Nassau	Lynden Pindling International Airport (NAS)	The Bahamas, Great Exuma	Exuma International Airport (GGT)		
The Bahamas, Nassau	Lynden Pindling International Airport (NAS)	The Bahamas, Cockburn Town	San Salvador Island (ZSA)		
The Bahamas, Nassau	Lynden Pindling International Airport (NAS)	The Bahamas, Stella Marris	Stella Marris Long Island Airport (SML)		
The Bahamas, Nassau	Lynden Pindling International Airport (NAS)	The Bahamas, Deadman's Cay	Deadman's Cay Long Island Airport (LGI)		
The Bahamas, Nassau	Lynden Pindling International Airport (NAS)	The Bahamas, Colonel Hill	Colonel Hill Crooked Island Airport (CRI)		
The Bahamas, Nassau	Lynden Pindling International Airport (NAS)	The Bahamas, Spring Point	Spring Point Airport (SXP)		
The Bahamas, Nassau	Lynden Pindling International Airport (NAS)	The Bahamas, Mayaguana	Mayaguana Airport (MYG)		
The Bahamas, Nassau	Lynden Pindling International Airport (NAS)	The Bahamas, Matthew Town	Inagua Airport (IGA)		
The Bahamas, Nassau	Lynden Pindling International Airport (NAS)	Turks and Caicos, Providenciales	Providenciales International Airport (PLS)		
The Bahamas, Nassau	Lynden Pindling International Airport (NAS)	Haiti, Cap-Haitien	Cap-Haitien International Airport (CAP)		
The Bahamas, Freeport	Grand Bahama International Airport (FPO)	United States, Orlando	Orlando International Airport (MCO)		
The Bahamas, Freeport	Grand Bahama International Airport (FPO)	United States, Fort Lauderdale	Fort Lauderdale-Hollywood International Airport (FLL)		
The Bahamas, Freeport	Grand Bahama International Airport (FPO)	The Bahamas, Nassau	Lynden Pindling International Airport (NAS)		
The Bahamas, Marsh Harbour	Marsh Harbour Airport (MHH)	United States, West Palm Beach	West Palm Beach International Airport (PBI)		
The Bahamas, Marsh Harbour	Marsh Harbour Airport (MHH)	The Bahamas, Nassau	Lynden Pindling International Airport (NAS)		
The Bahamas, North Eluthera	North Eleuthera Airport (ELH)	United States, Fort Lauderdale	Fort Lauderdale/Hollywood International Airport (FLL)		
The Bahamas, North Eluthera	North Eleuthera Airport (ELH)	The Bahamas, Nassau	Lyden Pindling International Airport (NAS)		
The Bahamas, North Eluthera	North Eleuthera Airport (ELH)	The Bahamas, Rock Sound	Rock Sound Airport (RSD)		
The Bahamas, Rock Sound	Rock Sound Airport (RSD)	The Bahamas, North Eleuthera	North Eleuthera Airport (ELH)		
The Bahamas, Rock Sound	Rock Sound Airport (RSD)	The Bahamas, Nassau	Lynden Pindling International Airport (NAS)		
The Bahamas, Rock Sound	Rock Sound Airport (RSD)	The Bahamas, Governor's Harbour	Governor's Harbour Airport (GHB)		
The Bahamas, Rock Sound	Rock Sound Airport (RSD)	The Bahamas, Great Exuma	Exuma International Airport (GGT)		
The Bahamas, Great Exuma	Exuma International Airport (GGT)	The Bahamas, Rock Sound	Rock Sound Airport (RSD)		
The Bahamas, Great Exuma	Exuma International Airport (GGT)	The Bahamas, Nassau	Lynden Pindling International Airport (NAS)		
The Bahamas, Great Exuma	Exuma International Airport (GGT)	United States, Fort Lauderdale	Fort Lauderdale Hollywood International Airport (FLL)		
The Bahamas, Cockburn Town	San Salvador Island Airport(ZSA)	United States, Miami	Miami International Airport (MIA)		
The Bahamas, Cockburn Town	San Salvador Island Airport(ZSA)	The Bahamas, Nassau	Lynden Pindling International Airport (NAS)		
The Bahamas, Cockburn Town	San Salvador Island Airport(ZSA)	The Bahamas, Stella Marris	Stella Marris Long Island Airport (SML)		
The Bahamas, Cockburn Town	San Salvador Island Airport(ZSA)	The Bahamas, Deadman's Cay	Deadman's Cay Long Island Airport (LGI)		
The Bahamas, Matthew Town	Inagua [Island] Airport (IGA)	The Bahamas, Nassau	Lynden Pindling International Airport (NAS)		
The Bahamas, Matthew Town	Inagua [Island] Airport (IGA)	The Bahamas, Mayaguana	Mayaguana Airport (MYG)		

== Accidents and incidents ==
As of 2025, Bahamasair has not suffered a fatal accident since its founding in 1973. However, three aircraft have been lost in non-fatal accidents and a weather event:

- On 31 July 1978, a Fairchild Hiller FH-227 impacted the runway of Chub Cay International Airport seconds after take-off with its gear already retracted. It skidded on the runway and came to a halt, but was damaged beyond repair. There were no fatalities.
- On 12 October 1998, a Hawker Siddeley HS 748 was damaged beyond repair by Hurricane Mitch while resting on the apron in Nassau.
- On 20 April 2007, a Bombardier Dash 8-300 suffered a failure of the left main gear while landing at Governor's Harbour Airport, causing the aircraft to skid on the runway until coming to a halt. The aircraft was damaged beyond repair and written off. None of the 48 passengers and 3 crew members were harmed.
- On 14 March 2017, an ATR 72-600 sustained substantial damage after being struck by a violent tornado at Nassau-Lynden Pindling International Airport, Bahamas. The left hand main landing gear collapsed.
