= SkyBahamas Airlines =

Sky Bahamas
IATA	ICAO	Call sign
Q7	SBM	TROPICAL SKY
- Founded: 1988
- Ceased operations: 2019
- Hubs: Lynden Pindling International Airport
- Fleet size: 5
- Destinations: 11
- Headquarters: Nassau, Bahamas
- Key people: Randy Butler (President & CEO)

Sky Bahamas was an airline based in Nassau, Bahamas.

== History ==
SkyBahamas Airlines in 2006. SkyBahamas has been forced to suspend flight operations pending the renewal of its Air Operator's Certificate (AOC) by the Bahamas Civil Aviation Authority (BCAA) on July 8, 2019.

== Destinations ==
The airline had scheduled service within the Bahamas (Marsh Harbour, Abaco; New Bight, Cat Island; and George Town, Exuma) as well as charters to the Caribbean.

== Fleet ==
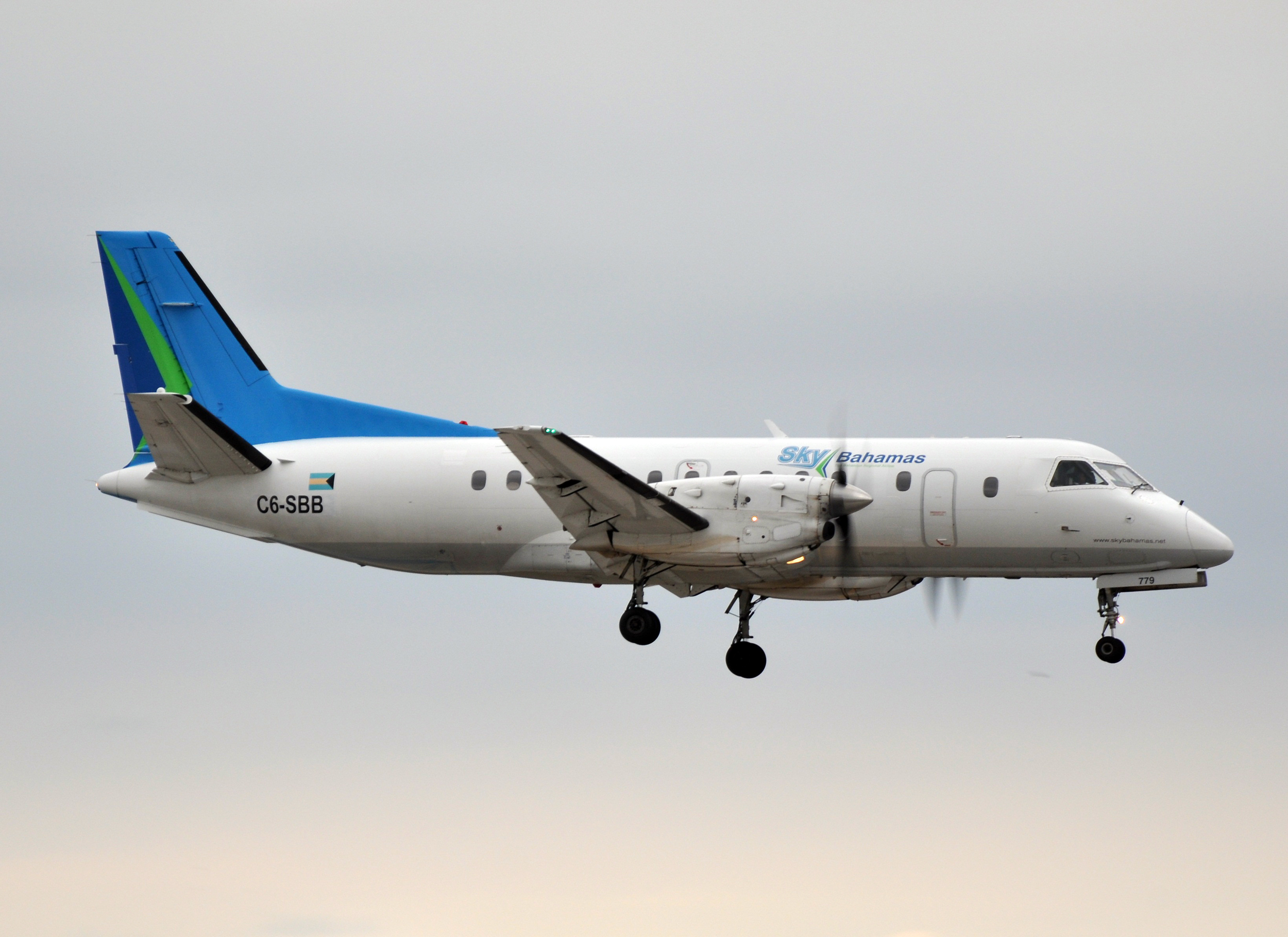
SkyBahamas Airlines Saab 340B

The Sky Bahamas fleet consisted of the following aircraft (as of 2019):

Aircraft	In Fleet	Orders	Retired
Saab 340B	4	—	—
Beechcraft 1900D	1	—	—
Total	5		
