= Exuma International Airport =

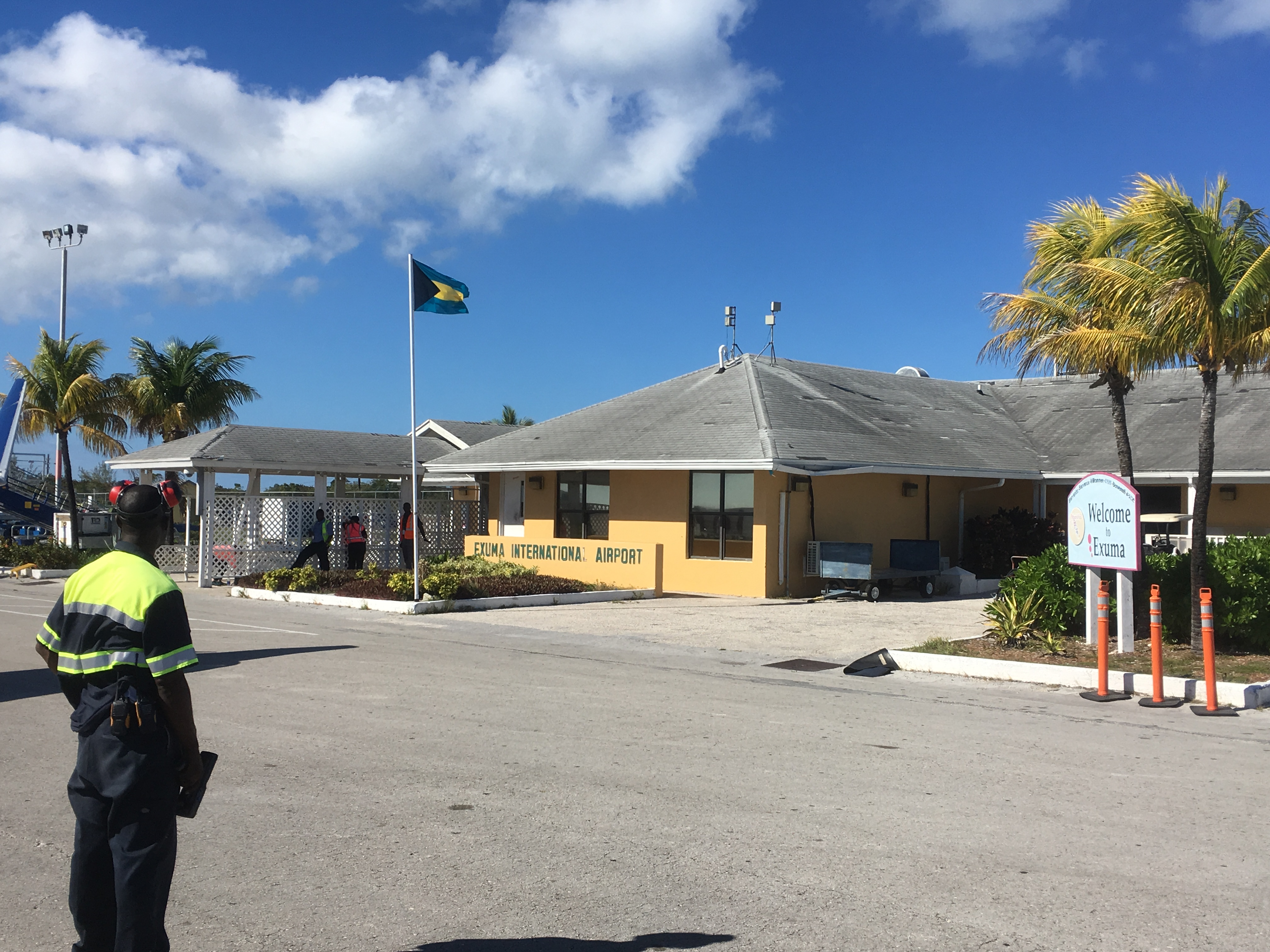
- Exuma International Airport Departures Building in February 2019
- IATA: GGT; ICAO: MYEF

Summary
- Airport type: Public
- Serves: Great Exuma, Bahamas
- Location: Moss Town
- Elevation AMSL: 9 ft (2.7 m)
- Coordinates: 23°33′48″N 075°52′23″W
- Website: exumaairport.com

Map
- Location in The Bahamas

Runways
Direction	Length		Surface
Direction	m	ft	Surface
12/30	2,149	7,051	Asphalt
- Source: DAFIF

Exuma International Airport (IATA: GGT, ICAO: MYEF) is a public airport serving the island of Great Exuma in the Bahamas. It is located near Moss Town, northwest of George Town. The airport services mainly light aircraft and regional jets from the United States, Canada, and The Bahamas.

== Facilities ==
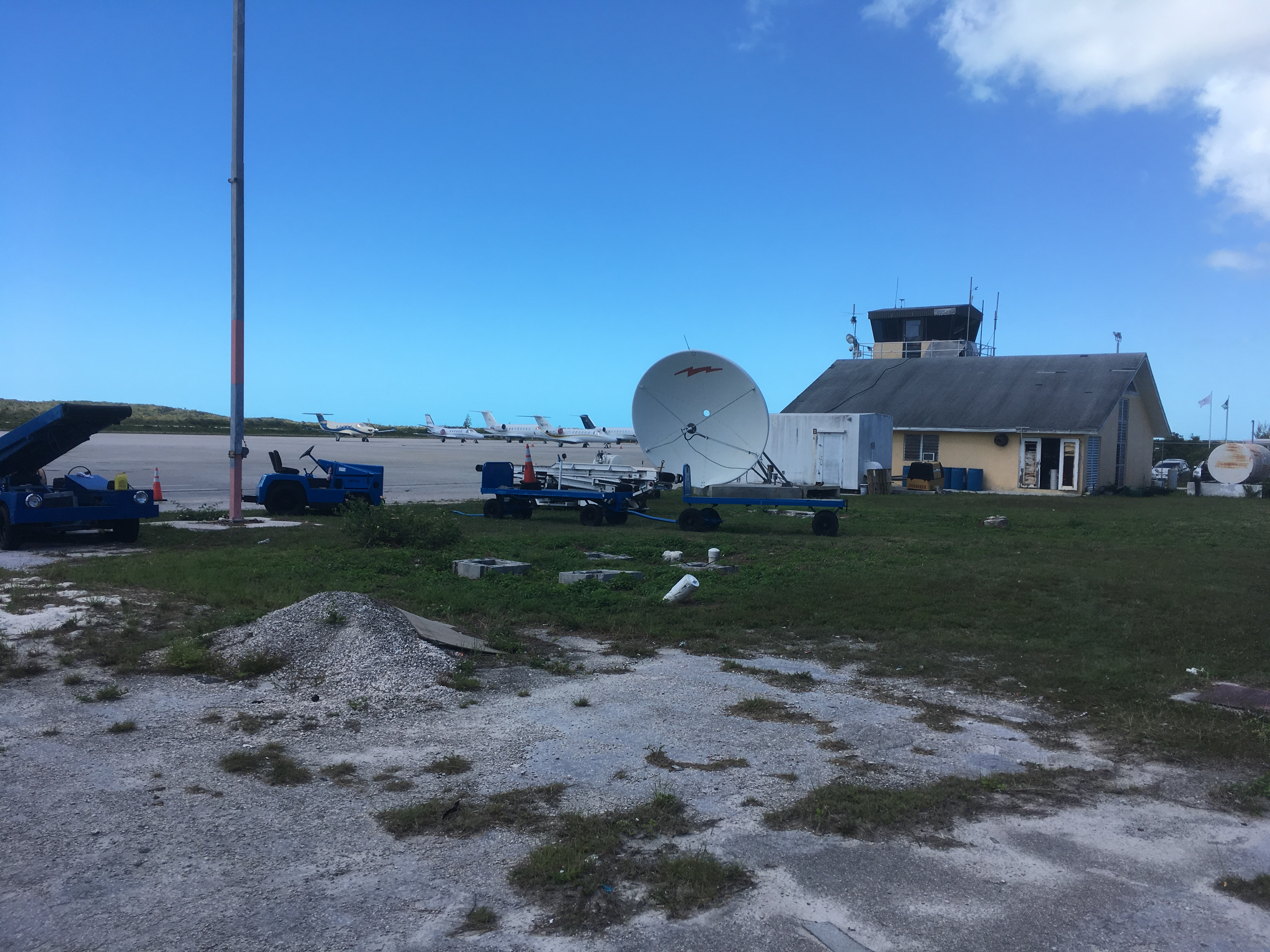
Airport control tower

The airport is at an elevation of 9 ft (2.7 m) above mean sea level. It has one runway designated 12/30 with an asphalt surface measuring 2,149 m × 46 m (7,051 ft × 151 ft).

As of May 2020, there was one terminal and boarding area at the commercially served airport. For general aviation, Odyssey Aviation operates an FBO with direct access to the ramp. The Bahamian government has designated Exuma International Airport as an important part of the Bahamian tourism economy and made plans to further develop the airport with a budget of $44 million. The additional development will include a new terminal building and fire rescue building. The new building will also include space for retail and Bahamian government agencies, with construction anticipated to "commence in the first quarter of 2021." Renovation of the airport will also include the runway, aprons and a new taxiway.

== Airlines and destinations ==
=== Passenger ===
Airlines	Destinations
Air Canada	Seasonal: Toronto–Pearson
American Airlines	Seasonal: Charlotte
American Eagle	Charlotte, Miami
Bahamasair	Nassau, Rock Sound; Seasonal: Fort Lauderdale
Delta Connection	Atlanta
Western Air	Nassau
