= Marsh Harbour Airport =

International airport serving Marsh Harbour, a town in the Abaco Islands, The Bahamas

Leonard M. Thompson International Airport
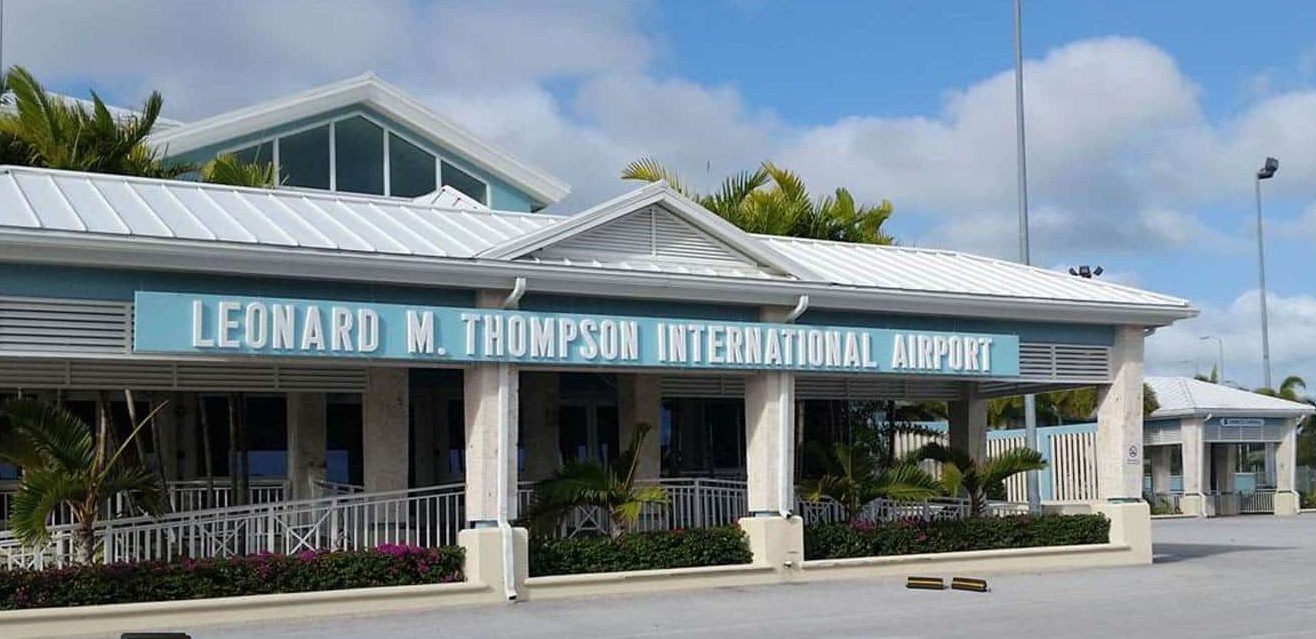
- IATA: MHH; ICAO: MYAM

Summary
- Airport type: Public
- Owner: Government of The Bahamas
- Operator: Vantage Airport Group
- Serves: Marsh Harbour, Abaco Islands, Bahamas
- Elevation AMSL: 6 ft / 2 m
- Coordinates: 26°30′41″N 077°05′01″W

Map
- Location in The Bahamas

Runways
Direction	Length		Surface
Direction	ft	m	Surface
09/27	6,100	1,859	Asphalt
- Source: DAFIF

Leonard M. Thompson International Airport, formerly known as The Marsh Harbour International Airport (IATA: MHH, ICAO: MYAM), is an airport serving Marsh Harbour, a town in the Abaco Islands, The Bahamas. Marsh Harbour is a major tourist attraction. The airport offers scheduled passenger flights to Nassau and several destinations in Florida as well as regional jet flights nonstop to three major U.S. hubs, Atlanta, Charlotte and Miami in the U.S. In 2007 a new runway was built to allow larger, regional jets to operate from Marsh Harbour. A new airport terminal opened on 27 May 2014.

== Facilities ==
The airport has an elevation of 6 ft (1.8 m) above mean sea level. It has one runway, designated 09/27, that has an asphalt surface measuring 1,859 m × 30 m (6,100 ft × 100 ft). In 2006, the old runway was converted into a taxiway after the new 6,100-foot-long (1,859 m) runway opened.

The new airport terminal opened on 27 May 2014 after three years of construction. The building incorporates architectural elements that reflect culture of The Bahamas. The new 46,000-square-foot (4,300 m^{2}) terminal has 22 counter positions, a new luggage scanning system, pilot briefing room, two restaurants, one lounge, shops, and a public parking area.

Marsh Harbour International Airport was renamed the Leonard M. Thompson International Airport on 25 May 2016. Thompson was a prominent son of Hope Town who flew bombers for the Royal Canadian Air Force during World War II.

== Airlines and destinations ==
=== Passenger ===
Airlines	Destinations
American Eagle	Miami; Seasonal: Charlotte
Bahamasair	Nassau, West Palm Beach
Delta Connection	Atlanta
Flamingo Air	Freeport
WesternAir	Nassau

== Accidents and incidents ==
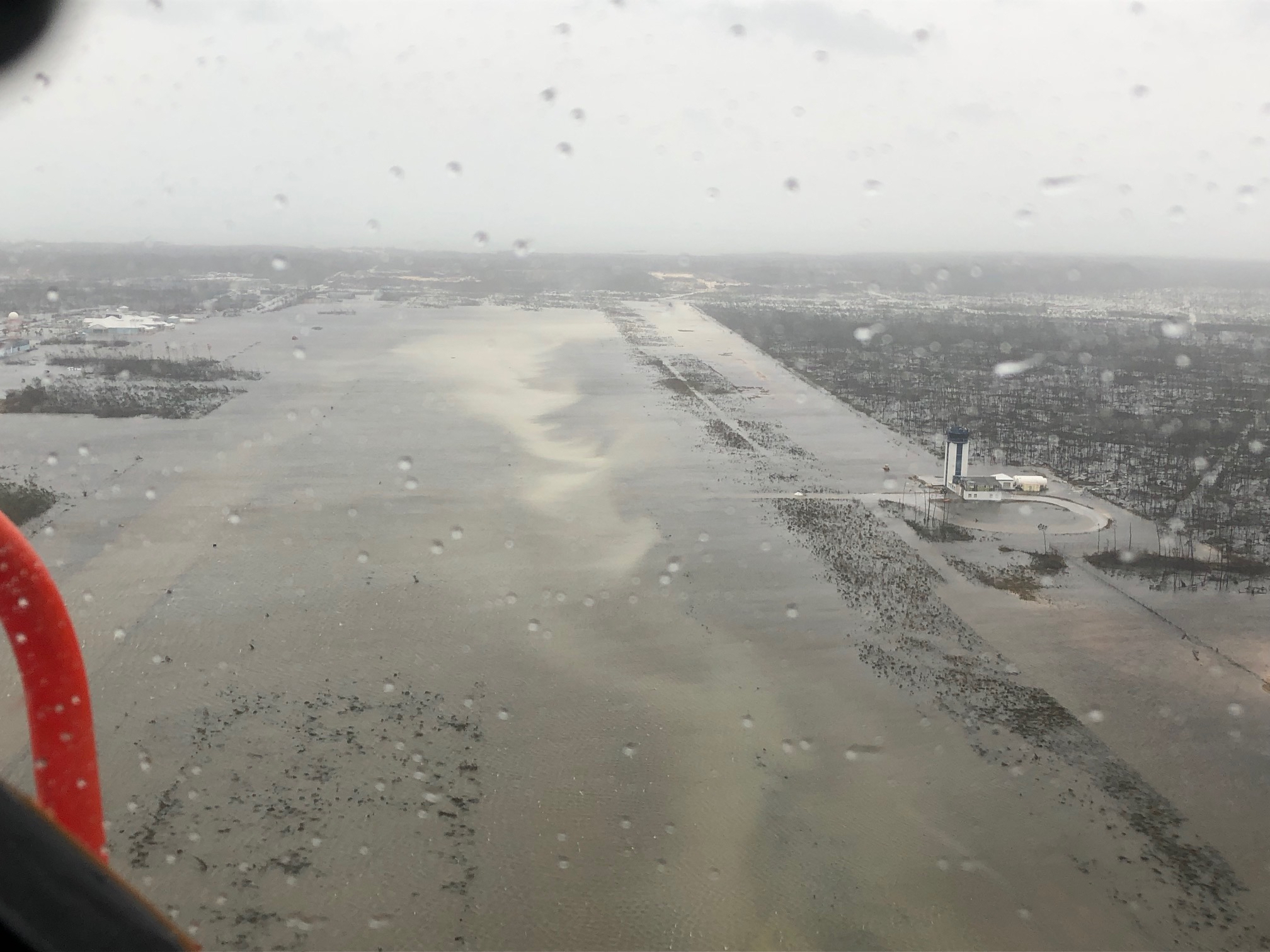
Marsh Harbour Airport after Hurricane Dorian, September 2019

- On 25 August 2001, American singer/actress Aaliyah and eight crew members of a group that had participated in the filming of her "Rock the Boat" music video, were killed soon after their Cessna 402 aircraft took off from Marsh Harbour Airport. The subsequent investigation determined that the aircraft had attempted to take off while heavily overloaded and with the weight improperly distributed. The pilot was not qualified on this type of aircraft, falsified experience records, and had signs of drug and alcohol use.
- On 13 June 2013, SkyBahamas Airlines C6-SBJ, a Saab 340B aircraft suffered substantial damage when it departed off the side of the runway while landing in heavy rain. There were no serious injuries or deaths among the 24 passengers and crew. The aircraft was subsequently written off.
- The airport was closed on 1 September 2019 as Hurricane Dorian approached the island. Marsh Harbour Airport was among the locations severely damaged by the storm and the runway was underwater for several days. The storm caused an estimated US$9.8 million in damages and there was an additional US$10.5 million in economic impact due to canceled flights. The airport reopened about three months later.
