= Chub Cay =

Island in The Bahamas

- Island
- Chub Cay
- Coordinates: 25°26′54″N 077°45′36″W
- Country: The Bahamas
- Island: Chub Cay
- District: Berry Islands

Population (2010)
  - Total: 46
- Website: Official website

Chub Cay is an island in the Berry Islands chain of The Bahamas with a population of 46 (2010 census). The island operates as a private, members-only club, with a resort and marina.

Access to the island's interior and amenities is strictly restricted to Chub Cay Club members and their registered guests. Only fuel and customs is open to the public, available from 7am to 7pm.

George Bishop purchased the island in 2013 and has since invested hundreds of millions of dollars into developing and improving the property and its infrastructure.

The local economy is primarily supported by operations of Chub Cay Resort and Marina. The island is accessible by boat to their marina, or by flight to the 5000ft runway airport with customs and immigration offices.

== Berry Islands chain ==
The Berry Islands chain consists of around thirty islands and over one hundred small cays. The Berry Islands chain, nicknamed "The Fish Bowl of The Bahamas" has a population of 807 residents, as of 2010 of which Chub Cay has a population of 46. The majority of the 807 people live on Great Harbor Cay.

Bahamian wreckers were the reason the Berry Islands were founded. These wreckers traveled around The Bahamas looking for remains of cargo ships that had crashed on the reefs. Williams Town was the first settlement (check sources) on an island called Great Stirrup, now known as CocoCay. Freed slaves settled on these islands after the British emancipation in 1834.

The Berry Islands chain includes many types of geography: seven miles of sandy beaches, blue holes, isolated enclaves, marshes, and caverns. Chub Cay has one of two blue holes that can be found in The Berry Island Chain. The other can be found on Hoffman Cay and is only accessible by boat. A blue hole is a large circle of water that has depths of thousands of feet. These holes are salt water and have many signs of sea life in them. The Chub Cay blue hole is accessible by golf cart and snapper can be caught in this mysteriously deep pool of water. There are also cars, bathtubs, and other random objects seen inside of the Chub Cay blue hole.

== Geography ==
The geography in Chub Cay is similar to many other islands in The Bahamas. It is a coral based island along with the other islands in the Berry Island Chain. There are narrow dirt roads that do not allow you to drive a car through the island and rather take a golf cart. Palm trees and open brush fill the east side of the island. The marina connects out to the open water of the Atlantic Ocean. The beachfront sands surround the entire island, but people tend to go to the beachfront located on the west side of the island. The weather is warm year round and the rainy season occurs during the summer.

== Wildlife ==
The wildlife in Chub Cay is very similar to the wildlife in the surrounding Bahamian Islands. There is land and sea wildlife that inhabit these areas. The iguana is a notable native species of Chub Cay Island. The Iguana is a bigger species of lizard that can only be seen in tropical places near the equator. The species can get rather large, but remains harmless. The iguana is a herbivorous species and will often be found sunbathing or hiding out in the tops of palm trees. The common sea animal by island would be the different species of snapper. You can see these fish in the marina, the ocean, or even fish for them off the shore around the island. Certain roosters and peacocks are specific to Chub Cay as well. Roosters and peacocks that roam the island are wildlife unique to Chub Cay. As strange as it is, the first settler of Chub Cay brought a plethora of birds with him to the island and they continued to reproduce and reside there to this day.

== Ownership ==
George Bishop bought Chub Cay on November 26, 2013. In 1981, George Bishop established the oil and gas company GeoSouthern Energy. GeoSouthern sold its south Texas fields to Devon Energy for $6 billion in 2013, making it one of the largest wins of the oil boom. In a joint venture with Blackstone Credit dubbed GEP Haynesville in 2015, he redeployed some funds into the Haynesville shale natural gas development in Louisiana. When Southwestern Energy bought GEP Haynesville for $1.85 billion in December 2021, he sold his shares in the business. Bishop then bought Chub Cay in 2013 and has been renovating the island as of 2022.

== Transportation ==
As Chub Cay is a private island, they have two modes of transportation to give people access to the island. Chub Cay has an airport that has a 5000’ paved runaway and a state of the art marina. Additionally, at the airport there is an on site Customs and Immigration office. Customs and Immigration are open daily, from 7 a.m. to 5 p.m. There are four public airlines that fly into Chub Cay. Tropic Air Charters INC, Makers Air, Aztec Airways, and Island Air Charters are all of the airlines that will fly you into Chub Cay. On the other hand, all private planes are given access to the runway and can be used to access the island with approval of size for the runway. If you are arriving by boat, radio channel 68 connects to the Customs and Immigration line to get approval onto the island. Chub Cay offers a complimentary tour of the island shortly after being approved through Customs and Immigration. The area is served by the Chub Cay International Airport (IATA: CCZ, ICAO: MYBC).

== Diving ==
The resort has a PADI 5 star dive center, Chub Cay Divers. As well as scuba diving they offer a variety of boat tour and watersport activities. The water surrounding Chub Cay is home to a wide variety of marine life which makes it a popular destination for water activities such as snorkeling and scuba diving. The coral reef is very healthy and conditions are calm and clear year round.

== Sports fishing ==
The sport fishing in Chub Cay is well known due to its proximity to the Tongue of the Ocean. The Tongue of the Ocean is a deep underwater trench that attracts varying species of marine life. Chub Cay’s water offers a variety of different types of fishing including bone fishing, deep sea fishing, and bottom fishing. During these excursions guests are likely to see billfish, tuna, grouper, yellowtail snapper, wahoo, and king mackerel. Chub Cay is known as “The Billfish Capital of The Bahamas”. Most of the billfish can be found in the ‘pocket’, a deepwater crossing, which is a worldwide hotspot for deep sea fishing. The pocket has certain times of the year where the billfish are more plentiful. See below
