= No. 111 (Coastal) Operational Training Unit RAF =

Former Royal Air Force Coastal Command Operational Training Unit

No. 111 (Coastal) Operational Training Unit
- Active: 20 August 1942 - 21 May 1946
- Country: United Kingdom
- Branch: Royal Air Force
- Type: Operational Training Unit
- Role: Aircrew Training
- Part of: RAF Coastal Command; *No. 17 Group RAF

No. 111 (Coastal) Operational Training Unit RAF, was a training unit of the Royal Air Force, within No. 17 Group RAF, which was part of RAF Coastal Command. The unit was established during August 1942 and disbanded during May 1946.

== History ==
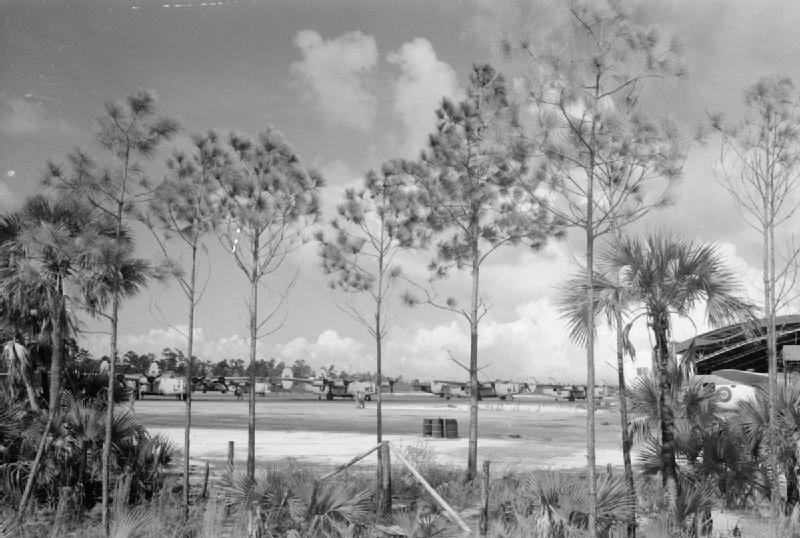
Consolidated Liberators of No. 111 (Coastal) Operational Training Unit, parked on the apron at Oakes Field, Nassau, Bahamas

No. 111 (Coastal) Operational Training Unit RAF was formed on 20 August 1942 at Oakes Field and Windsor Field, Nassau, The Bahamas. The unit was formed for the specific purpose of training of aircrew for reconnaissance on US aircraft types. It was equipped with North American B-25 Mitchell, an American medium bomber, and Consolidated B-24 Liberator, an American heavy bomber. In November the unit began aircrew training, initially with the B-25 Mitchell bomber aircraft, in conjunction with undertaking operational sorties, performing maritime reconnaissance and anti-submarine patrols over the western Atlantic.

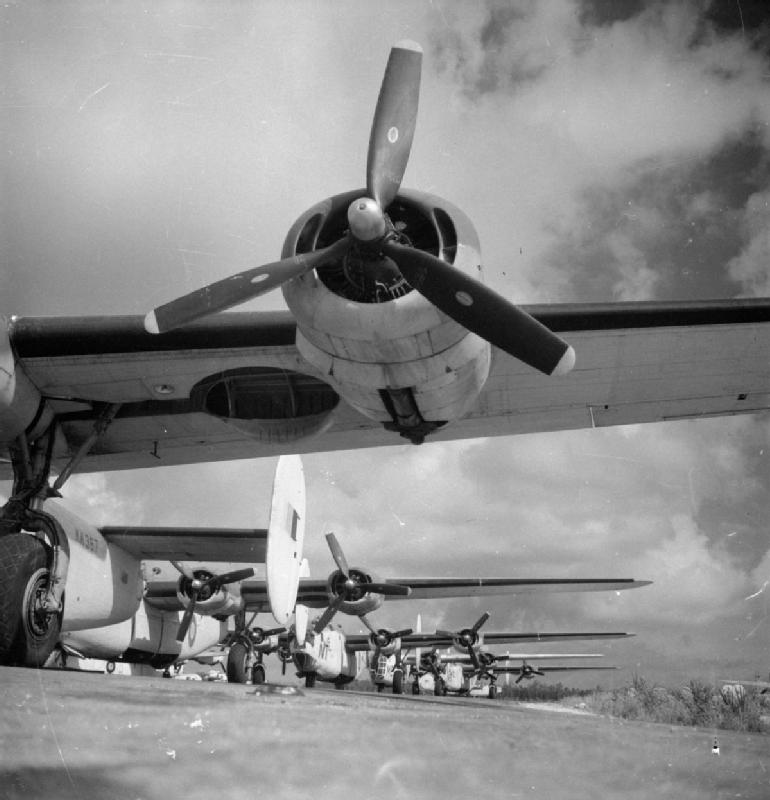
Consolidated Liberator Mark Vs and VIIIs of No. 111 (Coastal) Operational Training Unit lined up at Oakes Field, Nassau, Bahamas

No. 111 (C) OTU continued for almost three years at Nassau, before leaving the western Atlantic in July 1945 and returning to the UK. It relocated to RAF Lossiemouth as part of No. 17 Group RAF on 1 August 1945. One month later the unit transferred to No. 18 Group RAF on 1 September. It remained operational at RAF Lossiemouth for the following eight months before disbanding on 21 May 1946.

== Aircraft operated ==
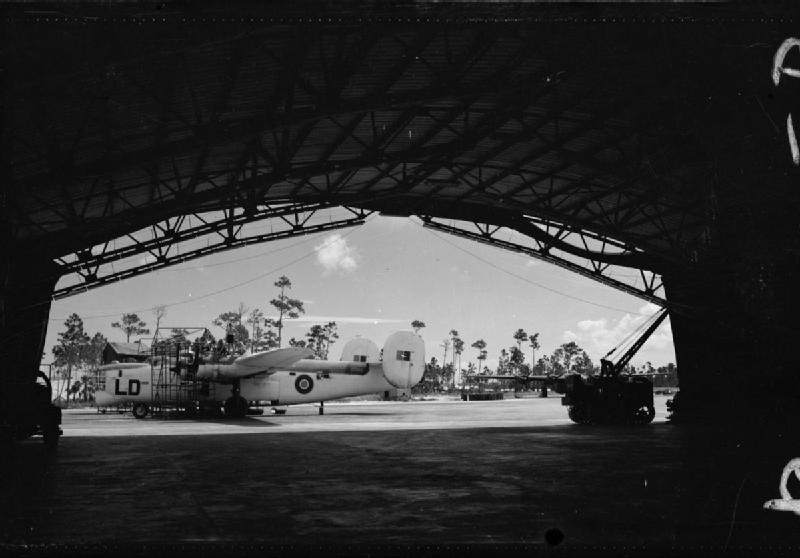
A Consolidated Liberator GR Mark V of No. 111 (Coastal) Operational Training Unit undergoes a routine service at Oakes Field, Nassau, Bahamas

No. 111 (Coastal) Operational Training Unit RAF was equipped with numerous types and variants of aircraft:

- North American Mitchell I, II & III medium bomber
- Consolidated Liberator III, V, VI, VIII heavy bomber
- Vickers Wellington XI long range medium bomber
- Handley Page Halifax III heavy bomber
- Brewster Bermuda I scout plane
- Grumman Gosling I amphibious aircraft
- Grumman Goose I amphibious flying boat
- Airspeed Oxford I training aircraft
- de Havilland Mosquito PR.35 multirole combat aircraft
- Supermarine Spitfire XVI fighter aircraft

== See also ==
- List of Royal Air Force Operational Training Units
