= Inagua Airport =

Inagua Airport Matthew Town Airport
- IATA: IGA; ICAO: MYIG

Summary
- Airport type: Public
- Location: Great Inagua island
- Elevation AMSL: 17 ft / 5 m
- Coordinates: 20°58′30″N 73°40′01″W

Map
- Location in The Bahamas

Runways
Direction	Length		Surface
Direction	m	ft	Surface
09/27	2,138	7,014	Asphalt
- Source: DAFIF

Inagua Airport (also known as Matthew Town Airport) (IATA: IGA, ICAO: MYIG) is a joint civil-military airport in Matthew Town in Inagua in Bahamas. In addition to commercial air service and utilization by general aviation aircraft, it is also home to a U.S. Coast Guard air facility.

== Airlines and destinations ==
Airlines	Destinations
Bahamasair	Nassau, Mayaguana
