= San Salvador Airport =

San Salvador Airport Cockburn Town Airport
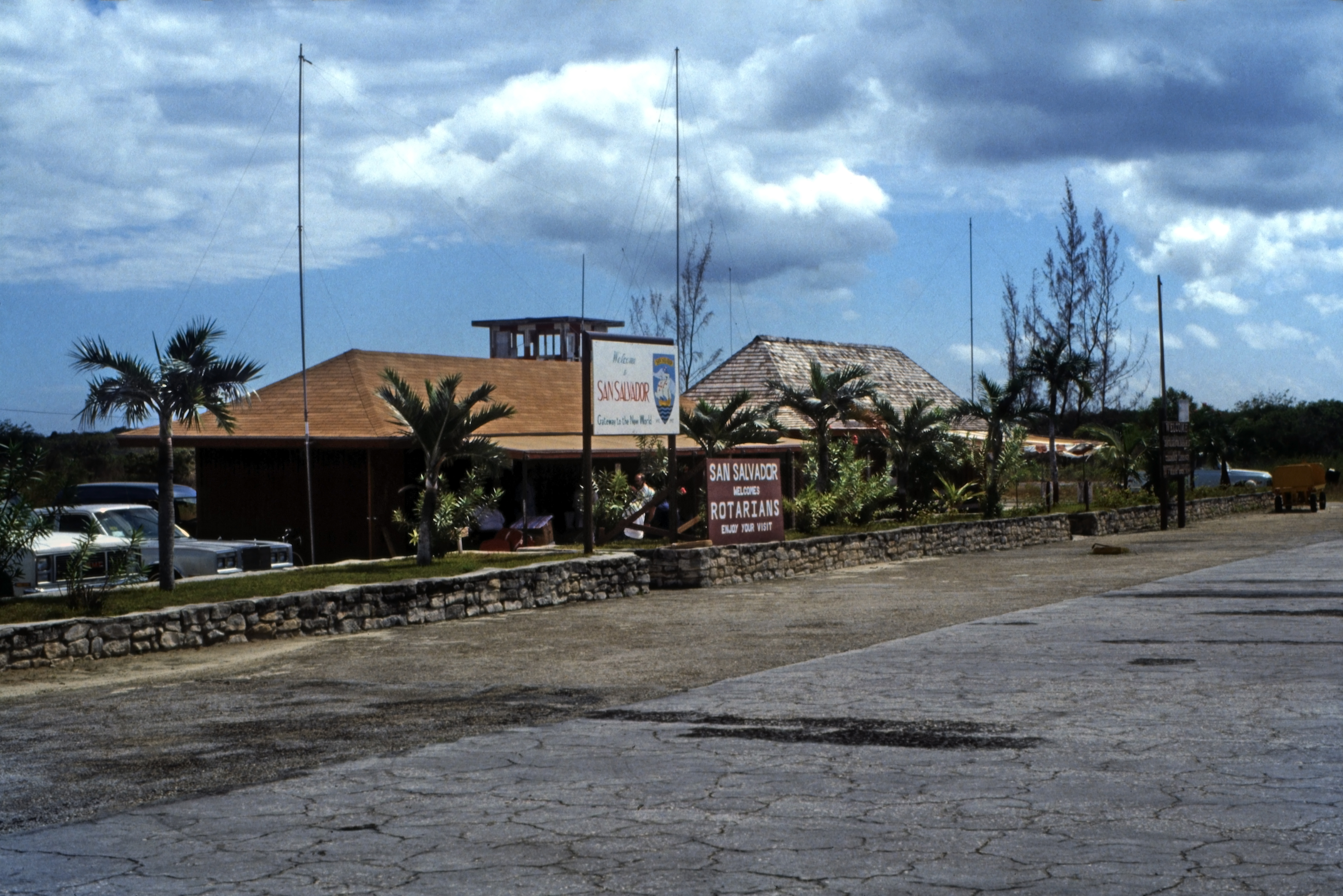
- Main terminal, 1989
- IATA: ZSA; ICAO: MYSM

Summary
- Airport type: Public
- Location: San Salvador Island
- Elevation AMSL: 24 ft (7.3 m)
- Coordinates: 24°03′48″N 074°31′26″W

Map
- Location in The Bahamas

Runways
Direction	Length		Surface
Direction	m	ft	Surface
10/28	2,438	7,999	Asphalt
- Source: DAFIF

San Salvador Airport (IATA: ZSA, ICAO: MYSM), also known as Cockburn Town Airport, is an airport in San Salvador, Bahamas.

== Overview ==
San Salvador International Airport is one of the few airports in the Bahamas that has Instrument rating landing for aeroplanes, and as a result aircraft can now land at ZSA after official sunset (with local civil aviation permission). Bahamas Customs and Immigration is present at ZSA between normal working hours of 9 am-5 pm. The main carrier at ZSA is the national flag carrier Bahamasair, which has daily flights to and from Nassau. Club Med, a major hotel on the island, also has charter jet service flights direct from Paris, Montreal and Miami.

== Airlines and destinations ==
Airlines	Destinations
Air Canada Rouge	Montréal–Trudeau
Air Caraïbes	Seasonal: Paris–Orly
Bahamasair	Deadman's Cay, Miami, Nassau, Rock Sound

== Accidents and incidents ==
- On 2 March 1973, Douglas C-47 N6574 of Arute International Air overran the runway on landing and was damaged beyond economic repair. The cause was pilot error in that a downwind landing was made. The aircraft was operating an international non-scheduled passenger flight from Miami International Airport, United States.
