= Great Harbour Cay =

- Island
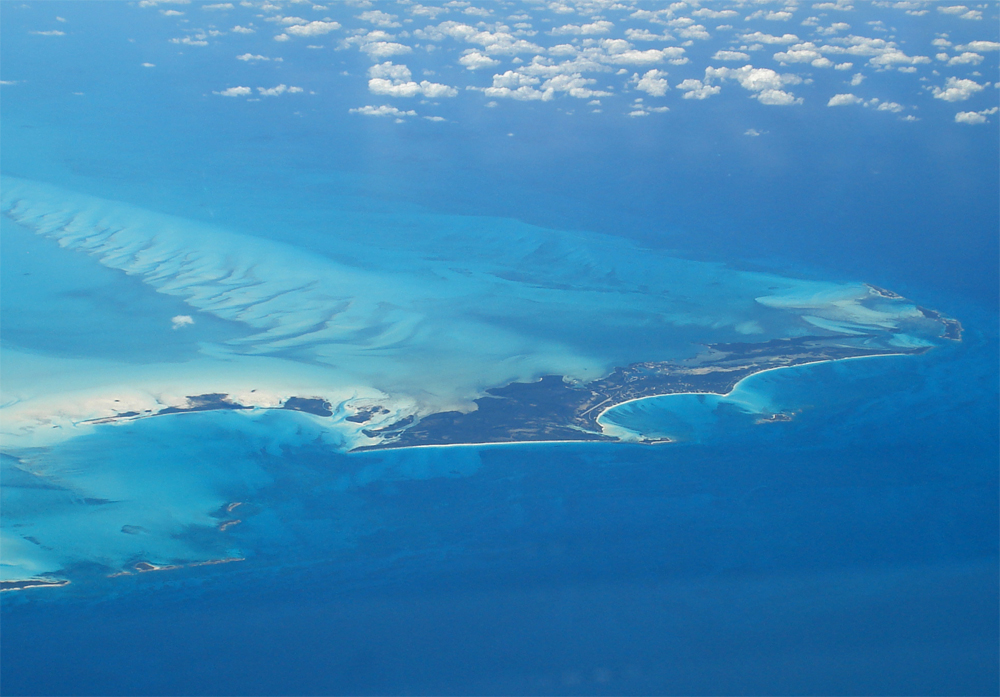
- Great Harbour Cay from 38,000 ft (11,582 m). March 2010

- Location within Bahamas
- Coordinates: 25°45′N 77°50′W
- Country: Bahamas
- Island: Great Harbour Cay
- District: Berry Islands

Population (2010)
  - Total: 353
- Time zone: UTC-5 (Eastern Time Zone)
- Area code: 242

Great Harbour Cay /ˈkiː/ is the major island in the north Berry Islands, a district of the Bahamas. It has a population of 353 (2010 census).

The islands are a stirrup-shaped chain of thirty large cays and numerous small cays of about thirty-two miles in length. The islands are located to the south of Great Abaco and about forty miles north-northwest of Nassau, the Bahamas capital.

== Berry Island Chain ==
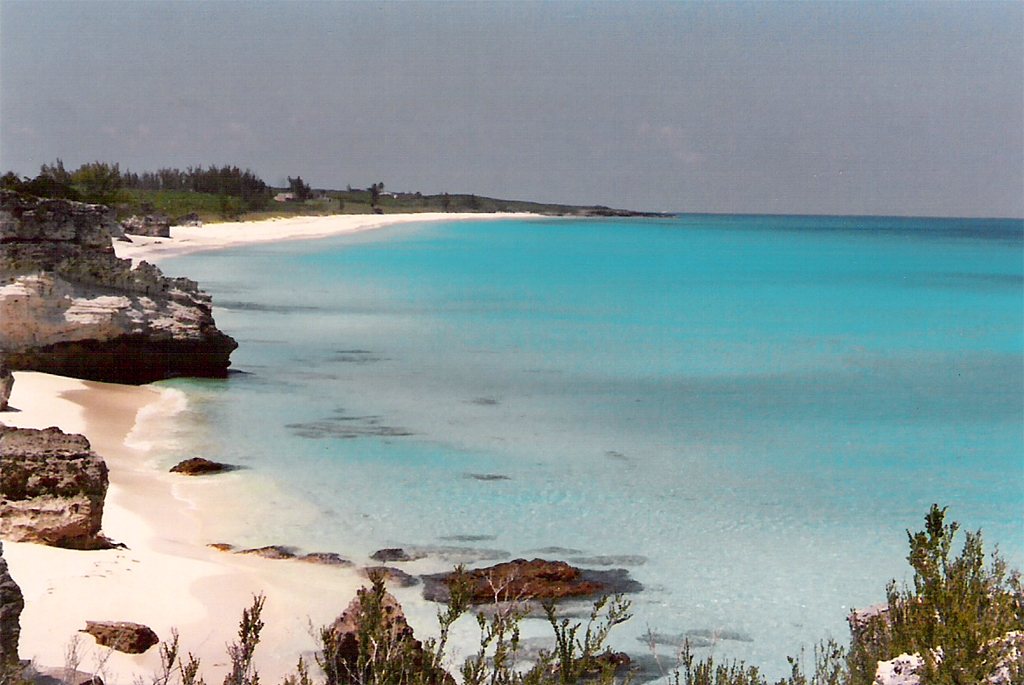
One of three horseshoe beaches on the island

The Berry Islands' chain has seven miles (11 km) of oceanfront beaches that include isolated enclaves, caverns, and open expanses. Haines Cay has 3.5 miles (5.6 km) of beaches. At the point of closest approach of Haines, Great Harbour, and Hawksnest, there are 10–15 acres (40,000–61,000 m^{2}) of white sand shallows with starfish, sand dollars and other shallow-water creatures.

The island was substantially damaged by Hurricane Andrew in 1992 but has fully recovered since. The hurricane made landfall twice while moving through the Bahamas, crossing Eleuthera with 160 mph (260 km/h) winds and passing through the Berry Islands with sustained winds of 150 mph (240 km/h).

== Development ==
Great Harbour Cay underwent a period of intense and successful development in the late 1960s when famous persons such as Cary Grant, Douglas Fairbanks, Brigitte Bardot and the Rat Pack vacationed there along with Telly Savalas who had his own landing pad (Kojak) for his helicopter. The Rat Pack frequented the Sugar Beach Hotel. F. Lee Bailey frequented with his helicopter and spent early mornings at the beach hut enjoying a cup of coffee. Francis Shields was rumored to live on the island though never seen even after development slowed and then stopped in the late 1970s. Stephanie B. was hired as Operations Manager of Revitalizing post-bankruptcy in 1976. The island had very few residents. The airport runway had no lighting. The 9-hole golf course and country club were in disrepair, villas along the marina were abandoned, resources were extremely limited. Considering the circumstances & attempts made in the late 1970s into the early 1980s to revitalize Great Harbour Cay; these were overshadowed by drug and weapons trafficking in 1983, resident 79-85 source (Book: Drugs, Law Enforcement And Foreign Policy - Report by the Committee on Foreign Relations, US Senate), and the island has been quiet since. The recently elected Bahamian government has made an effort to revive the tourism industry, especially on the outer islands, and great progress and interest has been rekindled in the smaller islands. Combined with the 9-hole golf course designed by Joe Lee and constructed by Golf Force, the full-service marina, and other island attractions of fishing and diving, the island looks set for a surge in development.

Certain actions in recent years, including repaving of the airport and all major roads, have led to increased interest in the island. The planned renovation of the water supply has not occurred, but has not had a major impact due to the large aquifer under the island and the widespread use of wells. There is only a small hotel on the island, catering principally to Bahamians, meaning lodging for tourists is limited to rental townhouses and single-family homes. There has been a rumor of a new hotel yet to be confirmed.

=== Sugar Beach Hotel ===
Sugar Beach Hotel, a frequent haunt of the rich and famous, is now deserted. In the late 1970s, the Sugar Beach Hotel was operational as an entertainment facility for cruise ships. Dinghies would bring passengers ashore to listen to a band and dance.

=== Bullock's Harbour ===
Access from Great Harbour Cay to Bullocks Harbour was over a manual crank bridge: Bullocks Harbour and Great Harbour are separated by an ocean inlet and tall cliffs. In the late 1970s, there was one building that served as a health facility, post office, and operator-assisted telephone. Across the street, there was an old home converted into a schoolhouse. There was one grocery store with live chickens and two bars known as the Chicken Coop and The Grave Yard. Resident(SB) 79-85 source.

=== Shark Creek ===
Shark Creek, the southernmost point of the island, is a popular shark fishing spot. A great hammerhead was reputedly caught off the coast near Ag point. The hammerhead in question was long known to be in the area and was documented to be over 20 feet (6.1 m) long. The shark has not been seen nor reported since being tagged in 2002.

== Manatees ==
A female manatee and her mate were discovered in the harbour in December 1999. The manatee was nicknamed 'Manny', and was believed to have strayed from the Florida coast after a tropical storm or hurricane in 1999. A young boy named Michael Morris documented a swim with the manatee on film.

Its mate was rumoured to have spent many months around Great Harbour, but then became solitary once again leaving the female behind, who is believed to have had a calf sometime in 2000.

In 2012, rescued manatees were brought from Atlantis to the island, where they quickly were accepted by the already present group.

== Dolphins ==
Dolphins are known to swim by the harbour close to shore from time to time.

== Transportation ==
The island is served by Great Harbour Cay Airport.
