= Governor's Harbour Airport =

- IATA: GHB; ICAO: MYEM

Summary
- Airport type: Public
- Location: Governor's Harbour, Bahamas
- Elevation AMSL: 26 ft / 8 m
- Coordinates: 25°17′05″N 076°19′52″W

Map
- Location in The Bahamas

Runways
Direction	Length		Surface
Direction	m	ft	Surface
15/33	2,446	8,025	Asphalt
- Source: DAFIF

Governor's Harbour Airport is an airport in Governor's Harbour on Eleuthera in the Bahamas (IATA: GHB, ICAO: MYEM). It is the second most active of the three airports on Eleuthera, and is about 8 mi (13 km) north of the city.

== Airlines and destinations ==
Airlines	Destinations
American Eagle	Miami; Seasonal: Charlotte
Bahamasair	Nassau
Pineapple Air	Nassau, North Eleuthera
Southern Air Charter	Nassau
