= Chub Cay International Airport =

Airport in the Bahamas

- IATA: CCZ; ICAO: MYBC

Summary
- Airport type: Private
- Serves: Chub Cay
- Location: Frazers Hog Cay
- Elevation AMSL: 5 ft (1.5 m)
- Coordinates: 25°25′02″N 077°52′51″W

Map
- Location in The Bahamas

Runways
Direction	Length		Surface
Direction	m	ft	Surface
11/29	1,524	5,000	Bitumen
- Source: DAFIF

Chub Cay Airport is an airport in Chub Cay in the Berry Islands in The Bahamas (IATA: CCZ, ICAO: MYBC).

== Accidents and incidents ==
On 31 July 1978, a Bahamasair Fairchild Hiller FH-227 impacted the runway of the airport seconds after take-off with its gear already retracted. It skidded on the runway and came to a halt, but was damaged beyond repair. There were no fatalities.
