= Black Point Airport =

- IATA: none; ICAO: MYEB

Summary
- Airport type: Public
- Serves: Black Point
- Location: Bahamas
- Elevation AMSL: 10 ft / 3 m
- Coordinates: 24°5′21.4″N 76°23′52.5″W

Map
- Location of Black Point Airport in the Bahamas

Runways
Direction	Length		Surface
Direction	m	ft	Surface
12/30	799	2,620	Asphalt
- Source: Landings.com

Black Point Airport (ICAO: MYEB) is a public use airport situated near Black Point, the Bahamas.

== Airlines and destinations ==
Airlines	Destinations
Flamingo Air	Nassau

== See also ==
- List of airports in the Bahamas
