= Great Harbour Cay Airport =

- IATA: GHC; ICAO: MYBG

Summary
- Airport type: Private
- Serves: Great Harbour Cay, Berry Islands, Bahamas
- Elevation AMSL: 18 ft (5.5 m)
- Coordinates: 25°44′18″N 077°50′24″W

Map
- Location in The Bahamas

Runways
Direction	Length		Surface
Direction	m	ft	Surface
13/31	1,372	4,501	Asphalt
- Source: DAFIF

Great Harbour Cay Airport (IATA: GHC, ICAO: MYBG) is an airport serving Great Harbour Cay, one of the major islands in the Berry Islands district of The Bahamas.

== Facilities ==
The airport resides at an elevation of 18 ft (5.5 m) above mean sea level. It has one runway designated 13/31 with an asphalt surface measuring 1,372 m × 30 m (4,501 ft × 98 ft).

== Airlines and destinations ==
Airlines	Destinations
Bahamasair	Nassau
Flamingo Air	Nassau
LeAir	Nassau
