= Lynden Pindling International Airport =

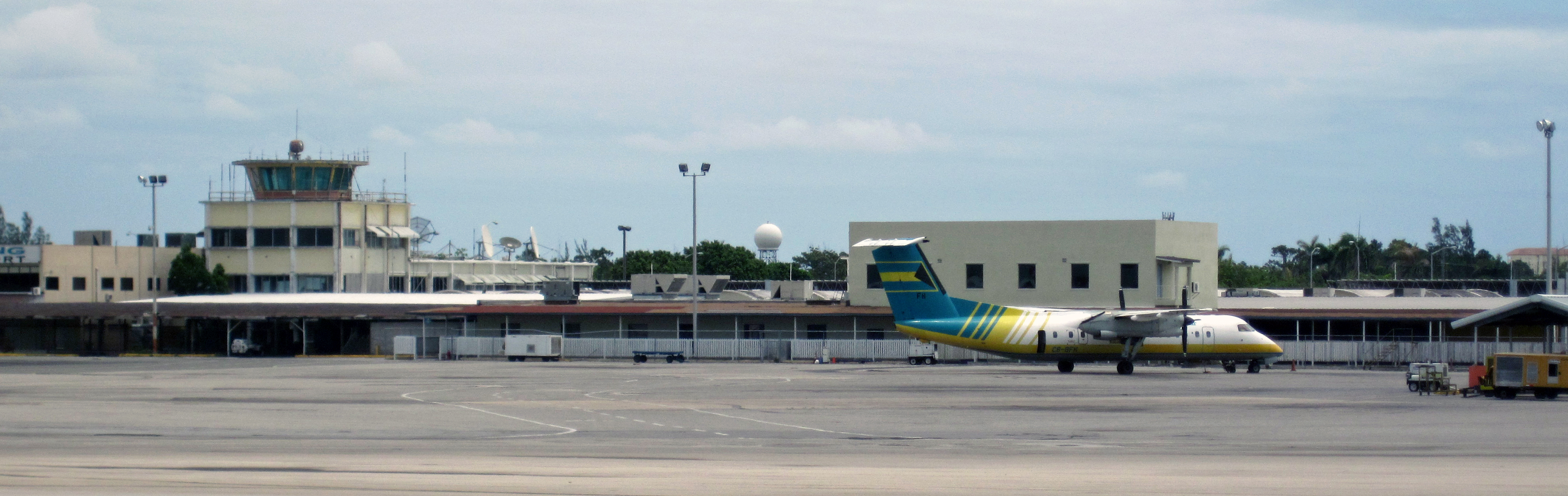
- IATA: NAS; ICAO: MYNN

Summary
- Airport type: Public
- Owner: Nassau Airport Development Company (Government of The Bahamas)
- Operator: Vantage Airport Group
- Serves: Nassau, Bahamas
- Hub for: Bahamasair; Pineapple Air; Western Air
- Elevation AMSL: 16 ft (4.9 m)
- Coordinates: 25°02′20″N 077°27′58″W
- Website: nassaulpia.com

Map
- Location in the Bahamas

Runways
| Direction | Length | | Surface |
| Direction | m | ft | Surface |
|---|---|---|---|
| 14/32 | 3,358 | 11,017 | Asphalt |
| 10/28 | 2,537 | 8,323 | Asphalt |

Statistics (2019)
- Passengers: 4,100,000
- Passenger change 13–14: ▲11%
- Aircraft movements: 90,182
- Movements change 13–14: N.D.
- Source: DAFIF, ACI's 2019 World Airport Traffic Report

Lynden Pindling International Airport (IATA: NAS, ICAO: MYNN), formerly known as Nassau International Airport, is the largest airport in the Bahamas and the largest international gateway into the country. It is a hub for Bahamasair, Western Air, Flamingo Air, Southern Air Charter and Pineapple Air. The airport is located in western New Providence island near the capital city of Nassau. The airport is named after Lynden Pindling, the first prime minister of the Bahamas.

== History ==
=== Early years ===
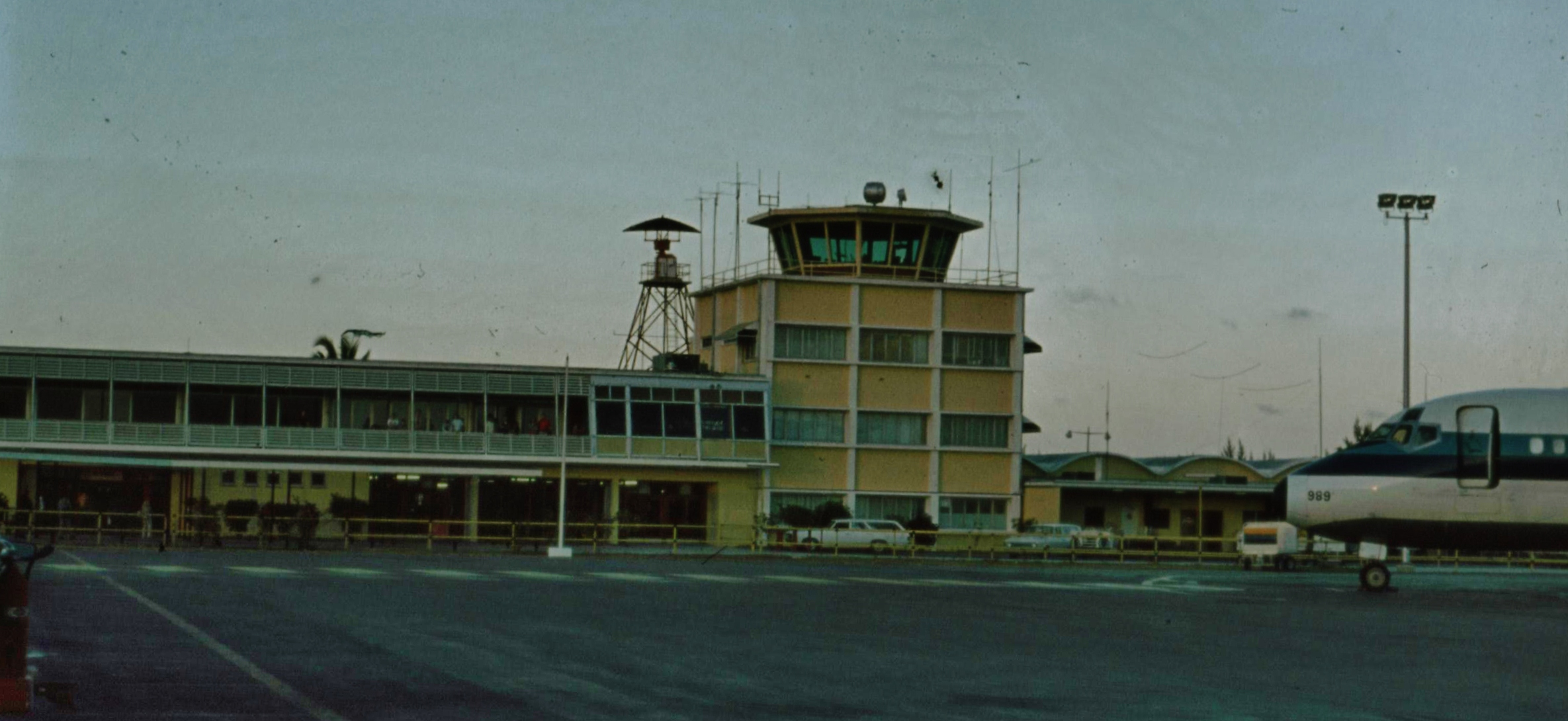
The airport in 1976

In August 1942, No. 111 (Coastal) Operational Training Unit RAF was established at Nassau Airport to train general reconnaissance crews using the North American Mitchell and Consolidated Liberators.

During the Second World War, on 30 December 1942, the airport was named Windsor Field (after the Duke of Windsor) and became a Royal Air Force (RAF) station.

111 OTU returned to the UK in August or September 1945 and was disbanded.

After the Second World War, on 1 June 1946, the RAF withdrew from Windsor Field and it reverted to civilian use. Oakes Field (now Thomas Robinson Stadium) remained as the main airport in the Bahamas due to its close proximity to downtown Nassau. At the Regional Caribbean Conference of the International Civil Aviation Organization held in Washington in September 1946, Oakes Field was recommended for designation as a long range regular airport. Oakes International Airport was kept in operation until midnight, 1 November 1957, when Nassau International Airport at Windsor Field was brought into full operation.

The name of the airport was officially changed on 6 July 2006 in honour of Lynden Pindling, first Prime Minister of Bahamas (1967 – 1992).

=== Expansion and renovations ===
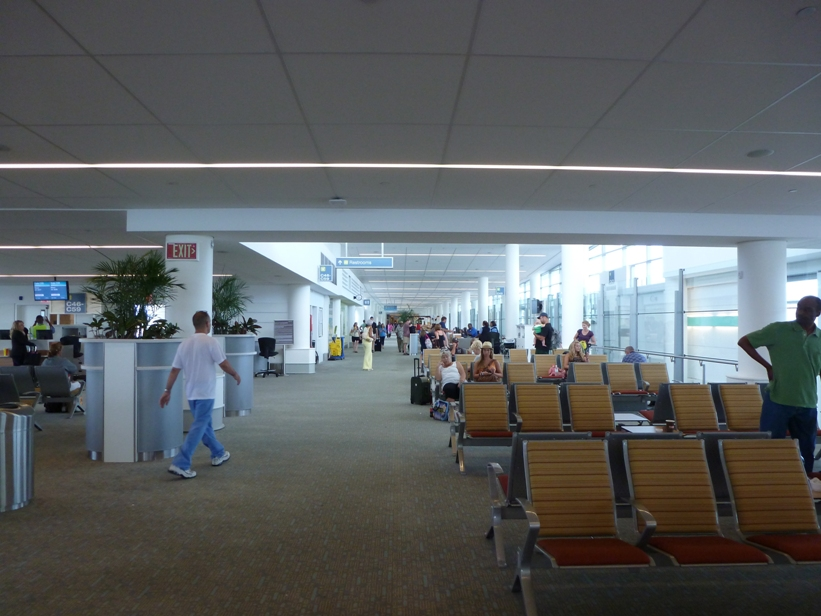
Terminal interior

With more than 3 million passengers and over 80,000 takeoffs and landings, the airport had reached its capacity by 2011 and its facilities were outdated and insufficient. In 2006, Nassau Airport Development Company (NAD) entered a 10-year management agreement with YVR Airport Services Ltd. (YVRAS), the commercial arm of Vancouver Airport Authority, to manage, operate and redevelop the airport.

The airport had the highest Turnaround Costs (landing, boarding bridge, passenger facility charge, security, measured on an Airbus A320) of Latin American airports in 2009.

The redevelopment upgraded the airport facilities to international standards and expanded terminal capacity. The work was carried out in three stages. The first stage included the design and construction of a new 247,000 sq ft (22,900 m^{2}) U.S. Departures Terminal, at a cost of $198.1 million. Stage 2 consisted of the complete renovation of the current U.S. terminal, to serve as the new U.S/International Arrivals Terminal, with a budget of $127.9 million. Stage 3 involved the design and construction of a new 112,000 sq ft (10,400 m^{2}) domestic arrivals and departures terminal, as well as an International Departures Terminal at the location of the existing International Arrivals Hall. This last stage cost $83.5 million.

The financing had to be restructured and therefore the redevelopment was slightly delayed because of the turmoil on financial markets in the wake of the bankruptcy of Lehman Brothers. Nevertheless, the first stage of the project was completed in March 2011. The $409.5 million invested resulted in 585,000 sq ft (54,300 m^{2}) of terminal space, a 21% increase, as well as the ability to accommodate 50% more passengers.

The airport handled 3.2 million passengers in 2008, and the expansion was expected to allow for roughly 5.2 million passengers to be processed by 2020, according to NAD.

== Airlines and destinations ==
=== Passenger ===
| Airlines | Destinations |
|---|---|
| Aeroméxico | Mexico City–Benito Juárez (begins March 19, 2027) |
| Air Canada | Montréal–Trudeau, Toronto–Pearson; Seasonal: Halifax, Ottawa |
| American Airlines | Charlotte, Miami, Philadelphia; Seasonal: Chicago–O'Hare, Dallas/Fort Worth, Washington–National |
| American Eagle | Miami |
| Bahamasair | Cap-Haitien, Colonel Hill, Deadman's Cay, Fort Lauderdale, Freeport, George Town, Great Harbour Cay, Governor's Harbour, Havana, Marsh Harbour, Matthew Town, Mayaguana, Miami, North Eleuthera, Orlando, Providenciales, Rock Sound, Stella Maris, San Salvador (Bahamas), Spring Point; Seasonal: Montego Bay |
| Breeze Airways | Raleigh/Durham (begins 30 June 2027), Tampa |
| British Airways | Grand Cayman, London–Heathrow, Providenciales |
| Caribbean Airlines | Kingston–Norman Manley |
| Copa Airlines | Panama City–Tocumen |
| Delta Air Lines | Atlanta, New York–JFK; Seasonal: Boston, Detroit, Minneapolis/St. Paul, New York–LaGuardia |
| Flamingo Air | Black Point, Great Harbour Cay, Mangrove Cay, Staniel Cay |
| InterCaribbean Airways | Providenciales |
| JetBlue | Boston, Fort Lauderdale, New York–JFK, Orlando |
| LeAir | Andros Town, Great Harbour Cay, Mangrove Cay |
| Pineapple Air | Governors Harbour, North Eleuthera |
| Porter Airlines | Seasonal: Montréal–Trudeau, Ottawa, Toronto–Pearson |
| Southern Air Charter | Duncan Town, Port Nelson |
| Southwest Airlines | Orlando; Seasonal: Austin (begins 5 june 2027), Baltimore, Nashville (begins June 3, 2027) |
| United Airlines | Houston–Intercontinental, Newark; Seasonal: Chicago–O'Hare, Denver, Washington–Dulles |
| United Express | Seasonal: Houston–Intercontinental, Washington–Dulles |
| Western Air | Congo Town, Fort Lauderdale, Freeport, George Town, Marsh Harbour, New Bight, San Andros, South Bimini |
| WestJet | Toronto–Pearson; Seasonal: Calgary |

== See also ==
- List of the busiest airports in the Caribbean
