= Staniel Cay Airport =

Airport in Staniel Cay, The Bahamas

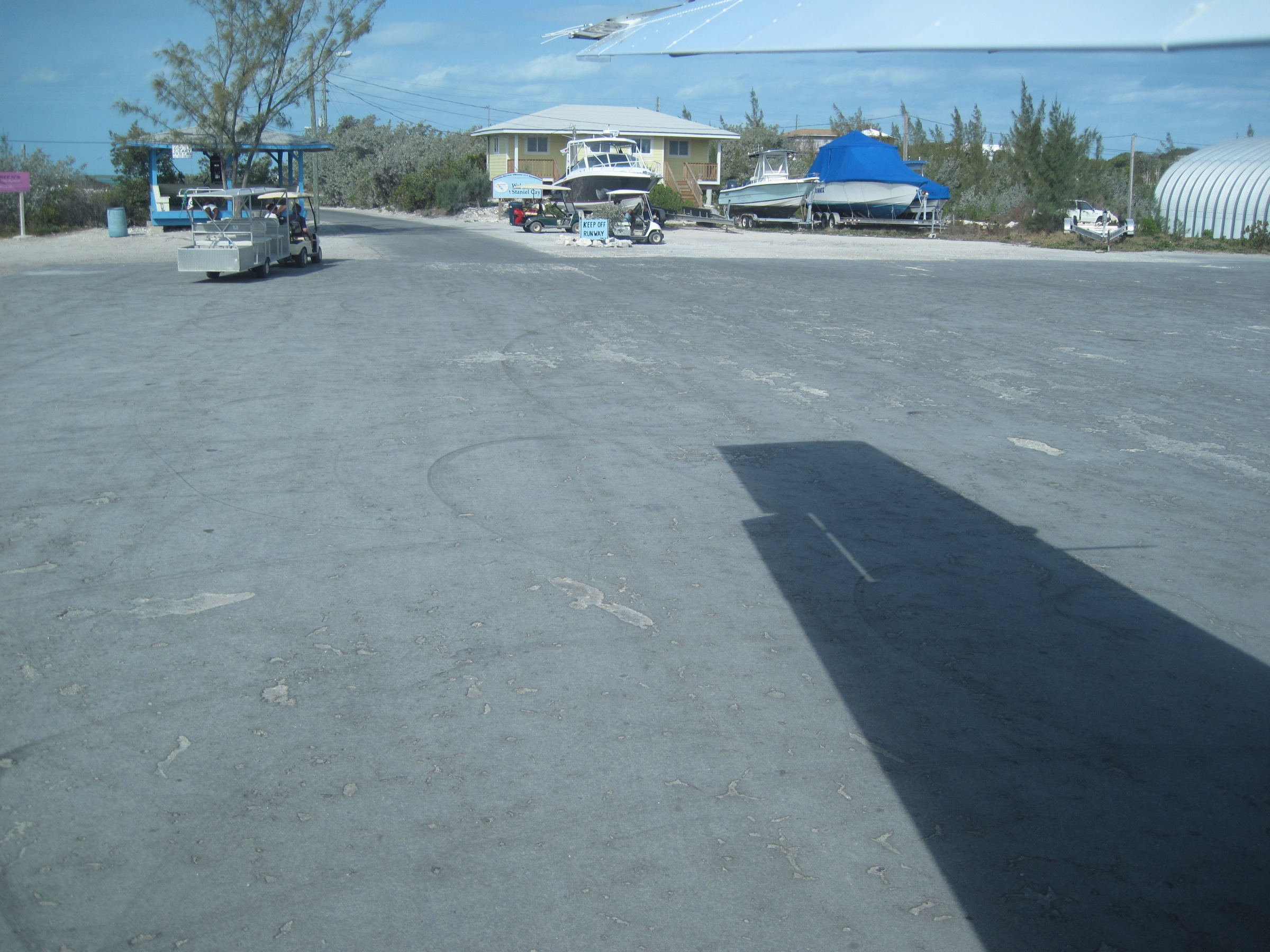
- IATA: TYM; ICAO: MYES

Summary
- Airport type: Public
- Serves: Staniel Cay, Exuma Islands, Bahamas
- Location: Staniel Cay
- Elevation AMSL: 5 ft / 2 m
- Coordinates: 24°10′09″N 076°26′21″W

Map
- Location in The Bahamas

Runways
Direction	Length		Surface
Direction	m	ft	Surface
16/32	924	3,031	Asphalt
- Source: DAFIF

Staniel Cay Airport (IATA: TYM, ICAO: MYES) is an airport serving Staniel Cay, one of the Exuma Islands in The Bahamas.

== Facilities ==
The airport resides at an elevation of 5 ft (1.5 m) above mean sea level. It has one runway designated 16/32 with an asphalt surface measuring 924 m × 23 m (3,031 ft × 75 ft).

== Airport ==
The airport has three private hangars and one runway. Titan Air, Flamingo Air and Makers Air have offices at the airport. It serves Staniel Cay and the surrounding Exuma Cays.

== Airlines and destinations ==
Airlines	Destinations
Flamingo Air	Nassau
