= Berry Islands =

Chain of islands and district of The Bahamas

- Islands and Third-Scheduled District
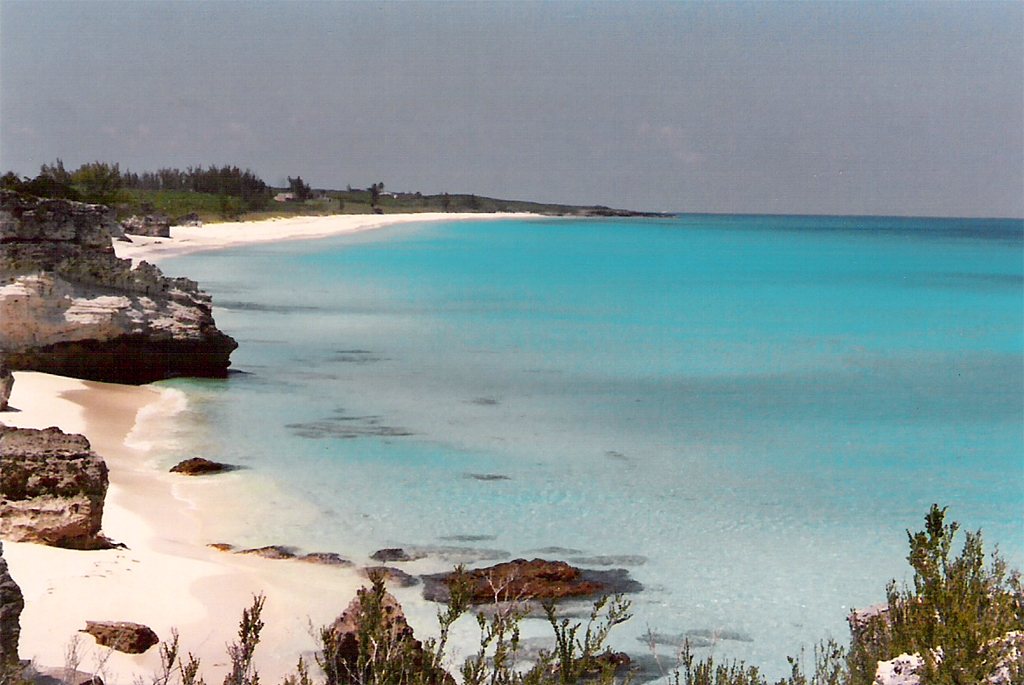
- Great Harbour Cay offers three horseshoe beaches

- Location of the District of the Berry Islands
- Coordinates: 25°43′N 77°50′W
- Country: The Bahamas
- Island: Berry Islands

Government
  - Type: District Council

Area
  - Total: 30 km^{2} (12 sq mi)

Population (2022)
  - Total: 1,002
  - Density: 33/km^{2} (87/sq mi)

Demographics 2010
  - Black: 87.86%
  - White: 7.81%
  - Other: 4.21%
- Time zone: UTC−5 (EST)
  - Summer (DST): UTC−4 (EDT)
- Area code: 242

The Berry Islands are a chain of islands and a district of The Bahamas, covering about twelve square miles (31 km^{2}).

The Berry Islands consist of about thirty islands and over one hundred small islands or cays, often referred to as "The Fish Bowl of The Bahamas." They have a population of 1,002 (2022 census), most of whom are on Great Harbour Cay. The islands were settled in 1836 by Governor William Colebrooke with a group of freed slaves.

== Attractions ==
The Berry Islands are still relatively undeveloped, with two small regional airports and no hotels, but do have townhouses and beach villas for rent for visitors. Most of the islands are uninhabited, but are strikingly beautiful. During the winter season the islands are visited by out-of-town guests and second home residents, but the difficulty of reaching the Berry Islands and the lack of infrastructure keeps things low-key. Due to seasonal residents, the Berry islands can say that they have more resident millionaires per unit area than any other place in the world.

The main attraction is big game fishing. Some of the fish that can be found there are billfish, tuna, grouper, tiger fish, yellowtail snapper, wahoo, king mackerel, and many more. In May, Great Harbour Cay is packed with visitors and fishing captains who go there for the annual fishing tournament. There are also great spots for snorkelling and scuba diving.

=== Islands ===
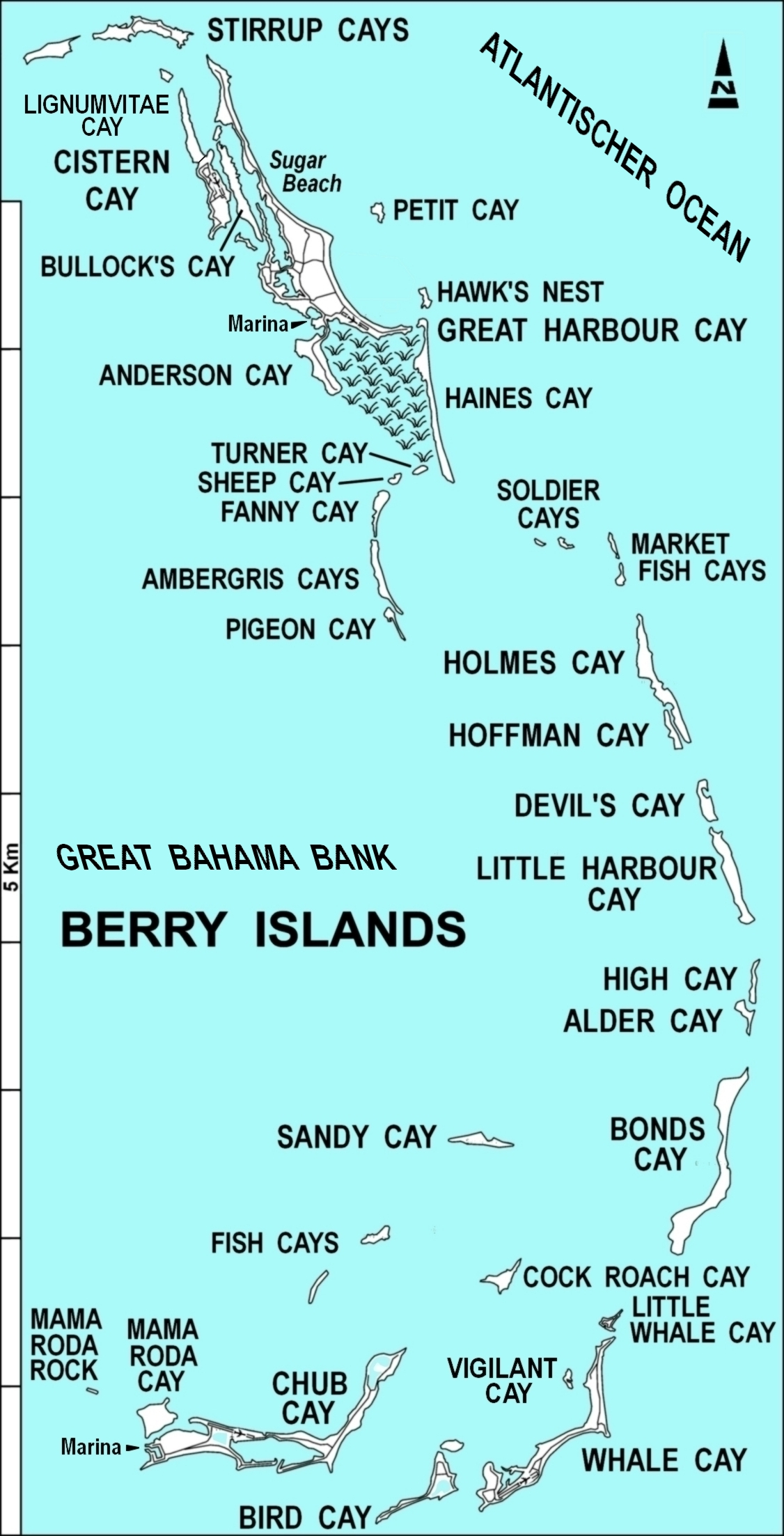
Map of the Berry Islands

Great Harbour Cay is the most northern and the largest of the Berry Islands. It is eight miles (13 km) long and one and a half miles (2.4 km) wide. The largest port of the Berries is on Great Harbour Cay. It is served by Great Harbour Cay Airport.

Chub Cay, site of Chub Cay International Airport, is the second largest island in the chain and is known as "the billfish capital of The Bahamas."

Little Stirrup Cay is leased by Royal Caribbean International, which calls it CocoCay, and acts as a private island for tropical activities engaged in by visitors on its cruise ships of the Royal Caribbean and Celebrity Cruises labels. Great Stirrup Cay is owned by Norwegian Cruise Line and is used for similar purposes.

Cistern Cay is a private island located next to Great Harbour Cay.

Little Whale Cay a private island that was developed as residence by Wallace Groves in the 1930s. It is served by the Lt. Whale Cay Airport.

== Politics ==
For elections to the Parliament of The Bahamas, the district is part of the North Andros and Berry Islands constituency.
