= Grand Bahama International Airport =

Airport in the Bahamas

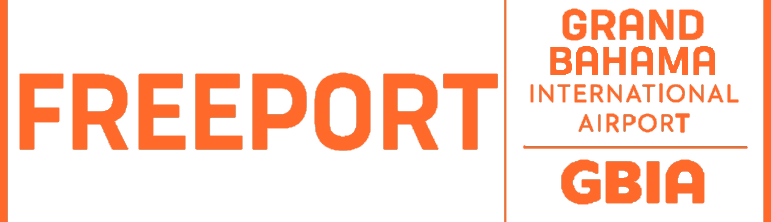
- IATA: FPO; ICAO: MYGF

Summary
- Airport type: Public
- Owner: Freeport Airport Development Company (Government of The Bahamas)
- Serves: Freeport, The Bahamas
- Hub for: Flamingo Air; Western Air
- Elevation AMSL: 8 ft (2.4 m)
- Coordinates: 26°33′31″N 078°41′44″W

Map
- Location in the Bahamas

Runways
Direction	Length		Surface
Direction	m	ft	Surface
06/24	3,360	11,024	Asphalt
- Source: DAFIF

Grand Bahama International Airport (GBIA) (IATA: FPO, ICAO: MYGF) is an international airport in Freeport, The Bahamas. It was privately owned until the government of The Bahamas purchased it on April 29, 2021, for one Bahamian dollar. The government were able to secure the deal largely because of the devastation from Hurricane Dorian, which almost completely destroyed the airport in 2019. The Bahamian government spent approximately $1 million on staff severance costs as part of the deal.

Before being purchased by the government of The Bahamas, the airport was a joint venture between Hutchison Port Holdings (HPH) and The Port Group (or the Grand Bahama Port Authority). The facility also includes 741 acres (300 ha) of land that adjoins it to the Freeport Harbour Company Limited as they operate as one entity, known as the Sea Air Business Centre (SABC).

== Facilities ==
The airport has a 3,359 m × 46 m (11,020 ft × 151 ft) runway which is capable of handling the largest aircraft in service and is relatively close to all major cities of the Eastern Seaboard of the United States.

The Grand Bahama International Airport also has:

- PAPI (precision approach path indicator) system
- Distance-remaining markers
- Category seven fire fighting facilities
- General aviation services
- Air conditioned passenger terminal

== Airlines and destinations ==
=== Passenger ===
Airlines	Destinations
American Eagle	Miami; Seasonal: Charlotte
Bahamasair	Fort Lauderdale, Nassau; Seasonal: Orlando
Flamingo Air	Marsh Harbour, South Bimini
WestJet	Seasonal: Montréal–Trudeau, Toronto–Pearson
Western Air	Fort Lauderdale, Nassau South Bimini

== Accidents and incidents ==
- On 12 November 1964, Lockheed Lodestar N171Q stalled after take-off and was destroyed by fire in the subsequent crash, killing all four people on board.
- On 22 November 1966, de Havilland DH.125 N235KC of Florida Commuter Airlines crashed into the sea 7.3 km (3.9 nmi) off Grand Bahamas during a flight from Miami, Florida.
- On 24 November 1979, Convair 440-86 N444JM of Mackey International Airlines was on an international non-scheduled passenger flight to Fort Lauderdale International Airport when the starboard engine caught fire just after take-off. On approach to Grand Bahamas International, the engine fell off. On landing, the aircraft departed the runway and ended up in the sea. All 46 people on board escaped from the aircraft.
- On 12 September 1980, Douglas DC-3A N75KW of Florida Commuter Airlines, operating a scheduled international passenger flight from West Palm Beach International Airport, Palm Beach, Florida, United States to Grand Bahama International Airport crashed into the sea 6.5 kilometres (3.5 nmi) off West End. All 34 people on board were killed.
- On 20 July 2000, Douglas C-47A N54AA of Allied Air Freight suffered an engine failure on take-off from Grand Bahama International Airport on a cargo flight to Nassau International Airport, Bahamas. The aircraft crashed while attempting to return to Grand Bahama International and was destroyed. Both crew were killed.
- On 9 November 2014, a Lear 36 Executive Jet crashed on approach to the airport. All nine people on board perished, including evangelist Myles Munroe and his wife.
- On 7 February 2017, a Western Air Saab 340 passenger aircraft landing gear failed shortly after takeoff. The aircraft turned around and crashed landed at the airport. All 30 passengers survived, and two sustained minor injuries.
- On 24 October 2020, an American Eagle ERJ-145LR (N674RJ) operating as Envoy Air Flight 4194 from Miami to Freeport had a runway excursion upon landing. Nobody was injured in the crash. The aircraft had suffered main gear damage, and the left main broke off.
