= South Bimini Airport =

- IATA: BIM; ICAO: MYBS

Summary
- Location: South Bimini, Bahamas
- Elevation AMSL: 10 ft (3.0 m)
- Coordinates: 25°42′00″N 079°15′53″W

Map
- Location in the Bahamas

Runways
Direction	Length		Surface
Direction	m	ft	Surface
09/27	1,655	5,430	Asphalt
- Source: DAFIF

South Bimini Airport (IATA: BIM, ICAO: MYBS) is an airport in South Bimini on Bimini in the Bahamas.

== Airlines and destinations ==
=== Passenger ===
Airlines	Destinations
American Eagle	Miami
Flamingo Air	Freeport
Western Air	Freeport, Nassau

Destinations map
Destinations from South Bimini Airport
Red = Year-round destination
Green = Seasonal destination

== See also ==
- The Fountain of Youth
