= Pineapple Air =

Bahamian airline

IATA	ICAO	Call sign
—	PNP	PINEAPPLE AIR
- Founded: 1999
- Hubs: Lynden Pindling International Airport
- Fleet size: 4
- Destinations: 8
- Key people: K. Michael Carey (CEO)
- Employees: 18
- Website: https://pineappleair.com/

Pineapple Air is an airline based in Nassau, Bahamas.

The airline operates scheduled flights within the Bahamas (Nassau, North Eleuthera, Governor's Harbour, Rocksound, Crooked Island, Acklins, Deadman's Cay, and Stella Maris).

Pineapple Air is a small regional airline based in Nassau, Bahamas, at Lynden Pindling international airport (LPIA). It was founded in 1999 by K. Michael Carey, CEO, and president. The company commenced operations in 2000 with a 15-seat Beechcraft C99 aircraft. It has since added slightly larger Beechcraft 1900, Embraer 110 Bandeirante, and eventually the Short 360-300 aircraft to its fleet. The airline has eight destinations.

== Incidents ==
An Embraer 110 Bandeirante had a landing gear collapse at 8:00 pm on January 9, 2018, at an airport in Eleuthera. One passenger had minor injuries and the plane sustained minor damages.

Another incident occurred at 9:08 pm on October 11, 2019, at LPIA Lynden Pindling International Airport, Nassau, Bahamas, involving an Embraer 110 Bandeirante with registration C6-KMC. The landing gear collapsed after landing on runway 14 at LPIA, resulting in no injuries of the nine passengers and two crew members.

An Embraer 110 Bandeirante had a wheel fall off its left main landing gear in North Eleuthera International Airport on June 23, 2020. No passengers or crew members were injured however the aircraft was damaged.

On 19 March 2026 a Beech 1900 suffered complete landing gear failure on touch down at Governor's Harbour. The aircraft came to rest on its belly with all passengers and crew escaping unharmed.

== Fleet ==
The Pineapple Air fleet consists of the following aircraft:

Pineapple Air fleet
Aircraft	In fleet	Orders
Beechcraft 1900C	1 (as of August 2025)	0
Embraer 110 Bandeirante	2	0
Short 360-300	1	0
Total	4	0
