= Southern Air Charter =

Bahamian airline

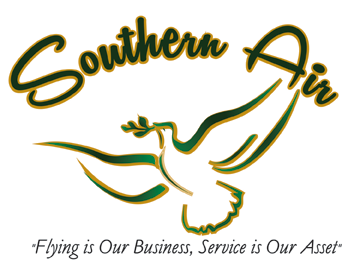
| IATA | ICAO | Call sign |
|---|---|---|
| PL | SOA | SOUTH AIRCHARTER |
- Founded: April 15, 1998
- Commenced operations: late 1998
- Fleet size: 3
- Destinations: (scheduled) 5
- Headquarters: Lynden Pindling International Airport
- Key people: Captain Nathaniel Gibbs (CEO)
- Website: www.southernaircharter.com

Southern Air Charter is an airline and air charter company, operating in the Bahamas. They mainly fly air charters, but the airline does offer some scheduled inter-island services between destinations in the Bahamas.

== Fleet ==
- As of April 2025 Southern Air Charter fleet consists of the following aircraft.

Southern Air Charter Fleet
| Aircraft | In service | Orders | Passengers | Notes |
|---|---|---|---|---|
| Jetstream 32 | 2 (as of August 2025) | 3 | 19 | Replacing Beech 1900D & 1900C |
| Super King Air 200 | 1 | | 9 | |
| Total | 3 | | | |

Historic Fleet

Southern Air Charter Historical Fleet
| Aircraft | Total | Introduced | Retired |
|---|---|---|---|
| Beechcraft 1900D | 2 | 1998 | 2024 |
| Beechcraft 1900C | 2 | 1998 | 2024 |

== Services ==
In addition to charter services, Southern Air Charter flies scheduled flights between Nassau, Bahamas and the following destinations:

  - Stella Maris Long Island, Bahamas
  - Deadman's Cay, Long Island; Bahamas
  - North Eleuthera, Eleuthera, Bahamas.
  - Governor's Harbor, Eleuthera, Bahamas.
  - Arthur's Town, Cat Island; Bahamas

Charter services to the following international destinations are also flown:

  - Cuba (Ciego de Avila, Havana, Varadero)
  - Haiti (Cap-Haïtien, Port-au-Prince)
  - Dominican Republic (La Romana, Puerto Plata)
  - Turks & Caicos (Grand Turk, Providenciales, North Caicos & South Caicos)

== Livery ==
White fuselage overall and the company logo on the tail.

In 2013 Southern Air rolled out a new White livery with a gold dove on its tail, on the 2 Beech 1900C aircraft.

== Accidents ==
On October 22, 2004, a Southern Air Charter Beechcraft 1900C ran out of fuel and crash-landed in the water off South Beach, New Providence on its way to Nassau. No one was hurt.

On September 30, 2016, a Southern Air Charter Beechcraft 1900C N376SA crashed at Deadman's Cay Airport. The aircraft attempted a landing with gear up.
