= List of American Eagle (airline) destinations =

These are the airports served by American Airlines' American Eagle brand, composed of six FAA and DOT certificated regional airlines.

Three regional airlines, Envoy Air, PSA Airlines, and Piedmont Airlines, are wholly owned subsidiaries of American, but whose aircraft are in American Eagle livery. Republic Airways is independent and operates United Express, American Eagle, and Delta Connection. SkyWest Airlines operates as American Eagle, as well as Alaska Airlines, Delta Connection and United Express.

Envoy Air, the largest wholly owned regional airline within the brand, is based in Fort Worth, Texas.

Listed below are all the airports served by American Eagle current as of March 2023.

Airport	Destinations
Boston Logan	Cincinnati, Columbus–Glenn, Harrisburg, Indianapolis, Louisville, Memphis, New York–JFK, Rochester (NY), St. Louis, Syracuse; Seasonal: Halifax, Hilton Head, Traverse City, Washington–National, Wilmington (NC)
Charlotte Douglas	Akron/Canton, Albany, Allentown, Asheville, Atlanta, Augusta (GA), Bangor, Baton Rouge, Birmingham (AL), Burlington (VT), Cedar Rapids/Iowa City, Charleston (SC), Charleston (WV), Charlottesville, Chattanooga, Cincinnati, Cleveland, Columbia (SC), Columbus–Glenn, Dayton, Daytona Beach, Des Moines, Destin/Fort Walton Beach, Detroit, Erie, Evansville, Fayetteville/Bentonville, Fayetteville (NC), Florence (SC), Fort Wayne, Gainesville, George Town, Greensboro, Greenville, Greenville/Spartanburg, Gulfport/Biloxi, Harrisburg, Hilton Head, Huntington, Huntsville, Indianapolis, Jackson (MS), Jacksonville (FL), Jacksonville (NC), Key West, Knoxville, Lafayette, Lexington, Little Rock, Louisville, Lynchburg, Manchester (NH), Melbourne/Orlando, Milwaukee, Mobile, Montgomery, Myrtle Beach, Nashville, New Bern, Newport News, Norfolk, North Eleuthera, Oklahoma City, Omaha, Panama City (FL), Pensacola, Peoria, Pittsburgh, Providence, Richmond, Roanoke, Rochester (NY), St. Louis, Salisbury, Sarasota, Savannah, Shreveport, South Bend, Springfield/Branson, Syracuse, Tallahassee, Tri-Cities (TN), Tulsa, Washington–Dulles, Washington–National, White Plains, Wilmington (NC); Seasonal: Appleton, Freeport, Marsh Harbour, Martha’s Vineyard, Montréal–Trudeau, Nantucket, Toronto–Pearson, Traverse City
Chicago O'Hare	Albany, Albuquerque, Allentown, Appleton, Asheville, Atlanta, Austin, Baltimore, Bangor, Birmingham (AL), Bloomington/Normal, Boise, Buffalo, Cedar Rapids/Iowa City, Champaign/Urbana, Charleston (SC), Cincinnati, Cleveland, Columbia (MO), Columbia (SC), Columbus–Glenn, Dayton, Des Moines, Detroit, El Paso, Fargo, Fayetteville/Bentonville, Flint, Fort Wayne, Grand Rapids, Green Bay, Greensboro, Greenville/Spartanburg, Harrisburg, Hartford, Huntsville, Indianapolis, Jacksonville (FL), Kalamazoo, Kansas City, Key West, Knoxville, La Crosse, Lansing, Lexington, Little Rock, Louisville, Madison, Manhattan (KS), Marquette, Memphis, Milwaukee, Minneapolis/St. Paul, Moline/Quad Cities, Montréal–Trudeau, Mosinee/Wausau, Nashville, Norfolk, Oklahoma City, Omaha, Peoria, Pittsburgh, Providence, Rapid City, Richmond, Rochester (MN), Rochester (NY), St. Louis, Salt Lake City, San Antonio, Sioux Falls, Springfield (IL), Springfield/Branson, Syracuse, Toronto–Pearson, Traverse City, Tulsa, Waterloo (IA), White Plains, Wichita, Wilkes-Barre/Scranton; Seasonal: Aspen, Billings, Bozeman, Burlington (VT), Destin/Fort Walton Beach, Harlingen, Hilton Head, Manchester (NH), Martha's Vineyard, Missoula, Myrtle Beach, Nantucket, Newark, Panama City (FL), Pensacola (FL), Portland (ME), Quebec City, Raleigh/Durham, Sarasota, Savannah, Wilmington (NC)
Dallas/Fort Worth	Abilene, Aguascalientes, Alexandria, Amarillo, Asheville, Aspen, Augusta (GA), Baton Rouge, Beaumont, Billings, Birmingham (AL), Bismarck, Bloomington/Normal, Brownsville/South Padre Island, Cedar Rapids/Iowa City, Champaign/Urbana, Chattanooga, Chihuahua, College Station, Colorado Springs, Columbia (MO), Corpus Christi, Dayton, Des Moines, Destin/Fort Walton Beach, Durango (CO), El Paso, Evansville, Fargo, Fayetteville/Bentonville, Fayetteville (NC), Flagstaff, Fort Smith, Fort Wayne, Gainesville, Garden City, Grand Island, Grand Junction, Grand Rapids, Gulfport/Biloxi, Harlingen, Houston–Hobby, Hermosillo, Huntsville, Idaho Falls, Jackson (MS), Killeen/Fort Cavazos, Lafayette, Lake Charles, Laredo, Lawton, Lexington, Longview, Louisville, Lubbock, Madison, Manhattan (KS), Memphis, Midland/Odessa, Mobile, Moline/Quad Cities, Monroe, Monterey (CA), Monterrey, Montgomery, Montrose, Panama City (FL), Pensacola, Peoria, Rapid City, Roswell, St. George (UT), San Angelo, Santa Fe, Shreveport, Sioux Falls, South Bend, Springfield/Branson, Stillwater, Tallahassee, Texarkana, Torreón/Gómez Palacio, Tri-Cities (TN), Tulsa, Tyler, Waco, Wichita, Wichita Falls, Yuma, Zacatecas; Seasonal: Acapulco, Burlington (VT), Daytona Beach, Eagle/Vail, Glacier Park/Kalispell, Hilton Head, Huatulco, Ixtapa/Zihuatanejo, Loreto, Manzanillo, Melbourne/Orlando, Mérida, Myrtle Beach, Santa Rosa, Sarasota
Los Angeles	Albuquerque, Denver, El Paso, Fayetteville/Bentonville, Houston–Intercontinental, Oklahoma City, Omaha, Portland (OR), Sacramento, Salt Lake City, San Antonio, San Francisco, San Jose (CA), Seattle/Tacoma, Tucson, Tulsa; Seasonal: Aspen, Bozeman, Eagle/Vail, Jackson Hole, Mazatlán, Missoula, Puerto Vallarta, Vancouver
Miami	Anguilla, Asheville, Atlanta, Austin, Birmingham (AL), Charleston (SC), Chattanooga, Cincinnati, Cleveland, Columbus–Glenn, Dominica–Douglas-Charles, Fayetteville/Bentonville, Fort-de-France, Freeport, Gainesville, George Town, Greensboro, Greenville/Spartanburg, Houston–Intercontinental, Indianapolis, Jacksonville (FL), Key West, Knoxville, Marsh Harbour, Memphis, Monterrey, Nashville, Nassau, New Orleans, North Eleuthera, Ocho Rios, Oklahoma City, Pensacola, Pittsburgh, Pointe-à-Pitre, Portland (ME), Raleigh/Durham, Rochester (NY), Savannah, Tallahassee, Tulsa; Seasonal: Albany, Baltimore, Burlington, Columbia (SC), Des Moines, Grand Rapids, Hartford, Jackson (MS), Kansas City, Little Rock, Madison, Norfolk, Omaha, Providence, Syracuse, Tampa, Tortola, White Plains
New York City JFK	Boston, Cincinnati, Cleveland, Columbus–Glenn, Indianapolis, Nashville, Norfolk, Pittsburgh, Raleigh/Durham, Toronto–Pearson, Washington–National
New York City LaGuardia	Atlanta, Asheville, Birmingham (AL), Buffalo, Charlottesville (VA), Chicago–O'Hare, Cincinnati, Cleveland, Columbia (SC), Columbus–Glenn, Dayton, Des Moines, Detroit, Fayetteville/Bentonville, Grand Rapids, Greensboro, Greenville/Spartanburg, Houston–Intercontinental, Indianapolis, Kansas City, Knoxville, Little Rock, Louisville, Memphis, Minneapolis/St. Paul, Montréal–Trudeau, Nashville, Norfolk, Oklahoma City, Omaha, Pittsburgh, Raleigh/Durham, Richmond, Roanoke, St. Louis, Toronto–Pearson, Tulsa, Washington–National, Wilmington (NC); Seasonal: Hilton Head, Key West, Rapid City, South Bend
Philadelphia	Albany, Asheville, Atlanta, Bangor, Birmingham (AL), Buffalo, Burlington (VT), Charleston (SC), Charlottesville (VA), Cincinnati, Cleveland, Columbia (SC), Columbus–Glenn, Dayton, Detroit, Fort Wayne, Grand Rapids, Greensboro, Greenville/Spartanburg, Harrisburg, Hartford, Houston–Intercontinental, Indianapolis, Jacksonville (FL), Kansas City, Knoxville, Lexington, Louisville, Madison, Manchester (NH), Memphis, Milwaukee, Minneapolis/St. Paul, Montréal–Trudeau, Myrtle Beach, Nashville, Norfolk, Pensacola, Pittsburgh, Portland (ME), Providence, Raleigh/Durham, Richmond, Roanoke, Rochester (NY), St. Louis, Salisbury (MD), Savannah, State College, Syracuse, Toronto–Pearson, Washington–National, Watertown (NY), Wilmington (NC), Worcester; Seasonal: Cozumel, Daytona Beach, Destin/Fort Walton Beach, Halifax, Hilton Head, Martha's Vineyard, Nantucket, Nassau, Panama City (FL), Québec City, Sarasota, Traverse City
Phoenix Sky Harbor	Albuquerque, Bakersfield, Burbank, Cedar Rapids/Iowa City, Durango (CO), El Paso, Eugene, Fayetteville/Bentonville, Flagstaff, Fresno, Grand Junction, Hermosillo, Houston–Intercontinental, Idaho Falls, Loreto, Lubbock, Medford, Midland/Odessa, Monterey, Monterrey, Oklahoma City, Ontario, Palm Springs, Redmond/Bend, Reno/Tahoe, Roswell, Salt Lake City, San Luis Obispo, Santa Barbara, Santa Fe, Santa Rosa, Sioux Falls, St. George (UT), Tijuana, Tucson, Tulsa, Yuma, Seasonal: Aspen, Billings, Boise, Eagle/Vail, Fargo, Jackson Hole, Kansas City, Madison, Manzanillo, Montrose, Rapid City, San Jose (CA), Wichita
Washington National	Akron/Canton, Albany, Asheville, Atlanta, Augusta (GA), Bangor, Baton Rouge, Birmingham (AL), Boston, Buffalo, Burlington (VT), Cedar Rapids/Iowa City, Charleston (SC), Charleston (WV), Charlotte, Chattanooga, Chicago–O'Hare, Cincinnati, Cleveland, Columbia (SC), Columbus–Glenn, Dayton, Des Moines, Detroit, Fayetteville/Bentonville, Fort Myers, Grand Rapids, Greensboro, Greenville/Spartanburg, Hartford, Indianapolis, Jackson (MS), Jacksonville (FL), Kansas City, Key West, Knoxville, Lansing, Little Rock, Louisville, Madison, Manchester (NH), Memphis, Minneapolis/St. Paul, Montgomery, Myrtle Beach, Nashville, New Orleans, New York–JFK, New York–LaGuardia, Norfolk, Oklahoma City, Panama City (FL), Pensacola, Philadelphia, Pittsburgh, Portland (ME), Providence, Raleigh/Durham, Rochester (NY), Sarasota, Savannah, St. Louis, Syracuse, Tallahassee, Toronto–Pearson, Tulsa, West Palm Beach, White Plains, Wilmington (NC); Seasonal: Daytona Beach, Destin/Fort Walton Beach, Halifax, Hilton Head, Martha's Vineyard, Melbourne/Orlando, Nantucket, Nassau, New Bern, Traverse City, Wichita

Further information : Executive Airlines former Destinations

== Canada ==
- British Columbia
  - Vancouver - Vancouver International Airport
- Nova Scotia
  - Halifax - Halifax Stanfield International Airport seasonal
- Ontario
  - Toronto – Toronto Pearson International Airport
- Quebec
  - Montreal – Montréal-Pierre Elliott Trudeau International Airport
  - Québec City – Québec City Jean Lesage International Airport seasonal

== Caribbean ==
Bahamas

- Abaco Islands
  - Marsh Harbour – Marsh Harbour Airport
- Eleuthera
  - North Eleuthera – North Eleuthera Airport
- Exuma
  - George Town – Exuma International Airport
- Grand Bahama Island
  - Freeport – Grand Bahama International Airport
- New Providence Island
  - Nassau – Nassau International Airport
- Guadeloupe
  - Pointe-à-Pitre – Pointe-à-Pitre International Airport
- Martinique
  - Fort-de-France – Martinique Aimé Césaire International Airport
- Jamaica
  - Saint Mary Parish - Ian Fleming International Airport

== Mexico ==
- Aguascalientes
  - Aguascalientes – Aguascalientes International Airport
- Baja California Sur
  - Loreto- Loreto International Airport
- Chihuahua
  - Chihuahua – Chihuahua International Airport
- Coahuila
  - Torreón – Torreón International Airport
- Durango
  - Durango-Durango International Airport
- Guerrero
  - Ixtapa-Zihuatanejo-Ixtapa-Zihuatanejo International Airport
- Jalisco
  - Guadalajara – Miguel Hidalgo y Costilla Guadalajara International Airport
- Michoacán
  - Morelia – Morelia International Airport
- Nuevo León
  - Monterrey - Monterrey International Airport via Republic Airways
- Oaxaca
  - Santa María Huatulco - Bahias de Huatulco International Airport
- Querétaro
  - Queretaro – Querétaro Intercontinental Airport
- Quintana Roo
  - Cozumel - Cozumel International Airport
- San Luis Potosí
  - San Luis Potosí – San Luis Potosí International Airport
- Sinaloa
  - Mazatlan – Mazatlán International Airport
- Sonora
  - Hermosillo - Hermosillo International Airport
- Yucatán
  - Mérida – Mérida International Airport

== United States ==
- Alabama
  - Birmingham – Birmingham-Shuttlesworth International Airport
  - Huntsville/Decatur – Huntsville International Airport
  - Mobile – Mobile Regional Airport
  - Montgomery – Montgomery Regional Airport
- Arizona
  - Flagstaff – Flagstaff Pulliam Airport
  - Phoenix – Phoenix Sky Harbor International Airport Hub
  - Tucson – Tucson International Airport
  - Yuma – Yuma International Airport
- Arkansas
  - Fayetteville – Northwest Arkansas National Airport
  - Ft. Smith – Fort Smith Regional Airport
  - Little Rock – Clinton National Airport
  - Texarkana – Texarkana Regional Airport
- California
  - Bakersfield – Meadows Field Airport
  - Burbank – Bob Hope Airport
  - Fresno – Fresno Yosemite International Airport
  - Los Angeles – Los Angeles International Airport Hub
  - Monterey – Monterey Regional Airport
  - Ontario – Ontario International Airport
  - Palm Springs – Palm Springs International Airport
  - Sacramento – Sacramento International Airport
  - San Francisco – San Francisco International Airport
  - San Jose – San Jose International Airport
  - San Luis Obispo – San Luis Obispo County Regional Airport
  - Santa Barbara – Santa Barbara Municipal Airport
  - Santa Rosa – Charles M. Schulz–Sonoma County Airport
- Colorado
  - Aspen – Aspen/Pitkin County Airport seasonal
  - Colorado Springs – Colorado Springs Airport
  - Denver – Denver International Airport
  - Durango – Durango–La Plata County Airport
  - Eagle/Vail – Eagle County Regional Airport seasonal
  - Hayden – Yampa Valley Airport seasonal
  - Montrose – Montrose Regional Airport seasonal
  - Grand Junction – Grand Junction Regional Airport
  - Gunnison – Gunnison–Crested Butte Regional Airport seasonal
- Connecticut
  - Hartford – Bradley International Airport
- Florida
  - Daytona Beach – Daytona Beach International Airport
  - Destin/Ft. Walton Beach – Destin–Fort Walton Beach Airport
  - Fort Lauderdale – Fort Lauderdale–Hollywood International Airport
  - Fort Myers – Southwest Florida International Airport
  - Gainesville – Gainesville Regional Airport
  - Jacksonville – Jacksonville International Airport
  - Key West – Key West International Airport
  - Miami – Miami International Airport Hub
  - Melbourne – Melbourne Orlando International Airport
  - Orlando – Orlando International Airport
  - Pensacola – Pensacola International Airport
  - Sarasota/Bradenton – Sarasota–Bradenton International Airport
  - Tallahassee – Tallahassee International Airport
  - Tampa – Tampa International Airport seasonal
  - West Palm Beach – President Donald J. Trump International Airport seasonal
- Georgia
  - Atlanta – Hartsfield–Jackson Atlanta International Airport
  - Augusta – Augusta Regional Airport
  - Savannah – Savannah/Hilton Head International Airport
- Illinois
  - Bloomington – Central Illinois Regional Airport
  - Champaign – University of Illinois Willard Airport
  - Chicago – O'Hare International Airport Hub
  - Moline – Quad Cities International Airport
  - Peoria – General Wayne A. Downing Peoria International Airport
  - Springfield – Abraham Lincoln Capital Airport
- Indiana
  - Evansville – Evansville Regional Airport
  - Ft. Wayne – Fort Wayne International Airport
  - Indianapolis – Indianapolis International Airport
  - South Bend – South Bend International Airport
- Iowa
  - Cedar Rapids – Eastern Iowa Airport
  - Des Moines – Des Moines International Airport
  - Dubuque – Dubuque Regional Airport
  - Sioux City – Sioux Gateway Airport
  - Waterloo – Waterloo Regional Airport
- Kansas
  - Garden City – Garden City Regional Airport
  - Manhattan – Manhattan Regional Airport
  - Wichita – Wichita Dwight D. Eisenhower National Airport
- Kentucky
  - Covington/Cincinnati – Cincinnati/Northern Kentucky International Airport
  - Louisville – Louisville International Airport
  - Lexington – Blue Grass Airport
- Louisiana
  - Alexandria – Alexandria International Airport
  - Baton Rouge – Baton Rouge Metropolitan Airport
  - Lafayette – Lafayette Regional Airport
  - Lake Charles – Lake Charles Regional Airport
  - Monroe – Monroe Regional Airport
  - New Orleans – Louis Armstrong New Orleans International Airport
  - Shreveport – Shreveport Regional Airport
- Maine
  - Bangor – Bangor International Airport
  - Portland – Portland International Jetport
- Maryland
  - Baltimore – Baltimore/Washington International Airport
  - Salisbury/Ocean City – Salisbury–Ocean City–Wicomico Regional Airport
- Massachusetts
  - Boston – Logan International Airport
  - Martha's Vineyard – Martha's Vineyard Airport seasonal
  - Nantucket – Nantucket Memorial Airport seasonal
  - Worcester – Worcester Regional Airport
- Michigan
  - Detroit – Detroit Metropolitan Airport
  - Flint – Bishop International Airport
  - Grand Rapids – Gerald R. Ford International Airport
  - Kalamazoo – Kalamazoo/Battle Creek International Airport
  - Lansing – Capital Region International Airport
  - Marquette – Sawyer International Airport
  - Traverse City – Cherry Capital Airport
- Minnesota
  - Minneapolis/Saint Paul – Minneapolis–Saint Paul International Airport
  - Rochester – Rochester International Airport
- Mississippi
  - Jackson – Jackson–Medgar Wiley Evers International Airport
  - Gulfport – Gulfport–Biloxi International Airport
  - Hattiesburg/Laurel – Hattiesburg–Laurel Regional Airport
  - Meridian – Meridian Regional Airport
- Missouri
  - Columbia – Columbia Regional Airport
  - Joplin – Joplin Regional Airport
  - Kansas City – Kansas City International Airport
  - Springfield/Branson – Springfield–Branson National Airport
  - St. Louis – St. Louis Lambert International Airport
- Montana
  - Billings – Billings Logan International Airport
  - Bozeman – Bozeman Yellowstone International Airport seasonal
- Nebraska
  - Grand Island – Central Nebraska Regional Airport
  - Omaha – Eppley Airfield
- Nevada
  - Reno – Reno–Tahoe International Airport
- New Hampshire
  - Manchester – Manchester–Boston Regional Airport
- New Jersey
  - Newark – Newark Liberty International Airport
- New Mexico
  - Albuquerque – Albuquerque International Sunport
  - Santa Fe – Santa Fe Regional Airport
  - Roswell – Roswell International Air Center
- New York
  - Albany – Albany International Airport
  - Buffalo – Buffalo Niagara International Airport
  - Ithaca – Ithaca Tompkins International Airport
  - Long Island/Islip – Long Island MacArthur Airport
  - New York City
    - John F. Kennedy International Airport Hub
    - LaGuardia Airport Hub
  - Newburgh – Stewart International Airport
  - Rochester – Greater Rochester International Airport
  - Syracuse – Syracuse Hancock International Airport
  - Watertown – Watertown International Airport
  - White Plains – Westchester County Airport
- North Carolina
  - Asheville – Asheville Regional Airport
  - Charlotte – Charlotte Douglas International Airport Hub
  - Fayetteville – Fayetteville Regional Airport
  - Greensboro – Piedmont Triad International Airport
  - Greenville – Pitt–Greenville Airport
  - Jacksonville – Albert J. Ellis Airport
  - New Bern – Coastal Carolina Regional Airport
  - Raleigh – Raleigh–Durham International Airport
  - Wilmington – Wilmington International Airport
- North Dakota
  - Bismarck – Bismarck Municipal Airport
  - Fargo – Hector International Airport
- Ohio
  - Akron/Canton – Akron–Canton Airport
  - Cleveland – Cleveland Hopkins International Airport
  - Columbus – John Glenn Columbus International Airport
  - Dayton – Dayton International Airport
  - Toledo – Toledo Express Airport
- Oklahoma
  - Lawton – Lawton–Fort Sill Regional Airport
  - Oklahoma City – Will Rogers World Airport
  - Stillwater – Stillwater Regional Airport
  - Tulsa – Tulsa International Airport
- Oregon
  - Eugene – Eugene Airport
  - Medford – Rogue Valley International-Medford Airport
  - Portland – Portland International Airport
  - Redmond/Bend – Roberts Field
- Pennsylvania
  - Allentown – Lehigh Valley International Airport
  - Erie – Erie International Airport
  - Harrisburgh – Harrisburg International Airport
  - Philadelphia – Philadelphia International Airport Hub
  - Pittsburgh – Pittsburgh International Airport
  - Scranton/Wilkes-Barre – Wilkes-Barre/Scranton International Airport
  - State College – State College Regional Airport
- Puerto Rico
  - San Juan – Luis Muñoz Marín International Airport
- Rhode Island
  - Providence – T. F. Green Airport
- South Carolina
  - Charleston – Charleston International Airport
  - Columbia – Columbia Metropolitan Airport
  - Florence – Florence Regional Airport
  - Greenville/Spartanburg – Greenville–Spartanburg International Airport
  - Hilton Head – Hilton Head Airport
  - Myrtle Beach – Myrtle Beach International Airport
- South Dakota
  - Rapid City – Rapid City Regional Airport
  - Sioux Falls – Sioux Falls Regional Airport
- Tennessee
  - Bristol – Tri-Cities Regional Airport
  - Chattanooga – Chattanooga Metropolitan Airport
  - Knoxville – McGhee Tyson Airport
  - Memphis – Memphis International Airport
  - Nashville – Nashville International Airport
- Texas
  - Abilene – Abilene Regional Airport
  - Amarillo – Rick Husband Amarillo International Airport
  - Austin – Austin–Bergstrom International Airport
  - Beaumont – Jack Brooks Regional Airport
  - Brownsville – Brownsville/South Padre Island International Airport
  - College Station – Easterwood Airport
  - Corpus Christi – Corpus Christi International Airport
  - Dallas/Fort Worth – Dallas Fort Worth International Airport Hub
  - Del Rio – Del Rio International Airport
  - El Paso – El Paso International Airport
  - Harlingen – Valley International Airport
  - Houston
    - George Bush Intercontinental Airport
    - William P. Hobby Airport
  - Killeen – Killeen Regional Airport
  - Laredo – Laredo International Airport
  - Longview – East Texas Regional Airport
  - Lubbock – Lubbock Preston Smith International Airport
  - McAllen – McAllen Miller International Airport
  - Midland/Odessa – Midland International Airport
  - San Angelo – Mathis Field
  - San Antonio – San Antonio International Airport
  - Tyler – Tyler Pounds Regional Airport
  - Waco – Waco Regional Airport
  - Wichita Falls – Wichita Falls Regional Airport
- Utah
  - Salt Lake City – Salt Lake City International Airport
  - St. George – St. George Regional Airport
- Vermont
  - Burlington – Burlington International Airport
- Virginia
  - Charlottesville – Charlottesville–Albemarle Airport
  - Lynchburg – Lynchburg Regional Airport
  - Newport News – Newport News/Williamsburg International Airport
  - Norfolk – Norfolk International Airport
  - Richmond – Richmond International Airport
  - Roanoke – Roanoke–Blacksburg Regional Airport
- Washington
  - Seattle/Tacoma – Seattle–Tacoma International Airport
- Washington, D.C. (District of Columbia)
  - Washington, D.C. – Ronald Reagan Washington National Airport Hub
  - Dulles, Virginia – Dulles International Airport
- West Virginia
  - Charleston – Yeager Airport
  - Huntington – Tri-State Airport
- Wisconsin
  - Appleton – Appleton International Airport
  - Green Bay – Green Bay–Austin Straubel International Airport
  - La Crosse – La Crosse Regional Airport
  - Madison – Dane County Regional Airport
  - Milwaukee – Milwaukee Mitchell International Airport
  - Wausau – Central Wisconsin Airport
- Wyoming
  - Jackson Hole – Jackson Hole Airport seasonal
