= Charlottesville–Albemarle Airport =

Airport serving Charlottesville, Virginia, USA

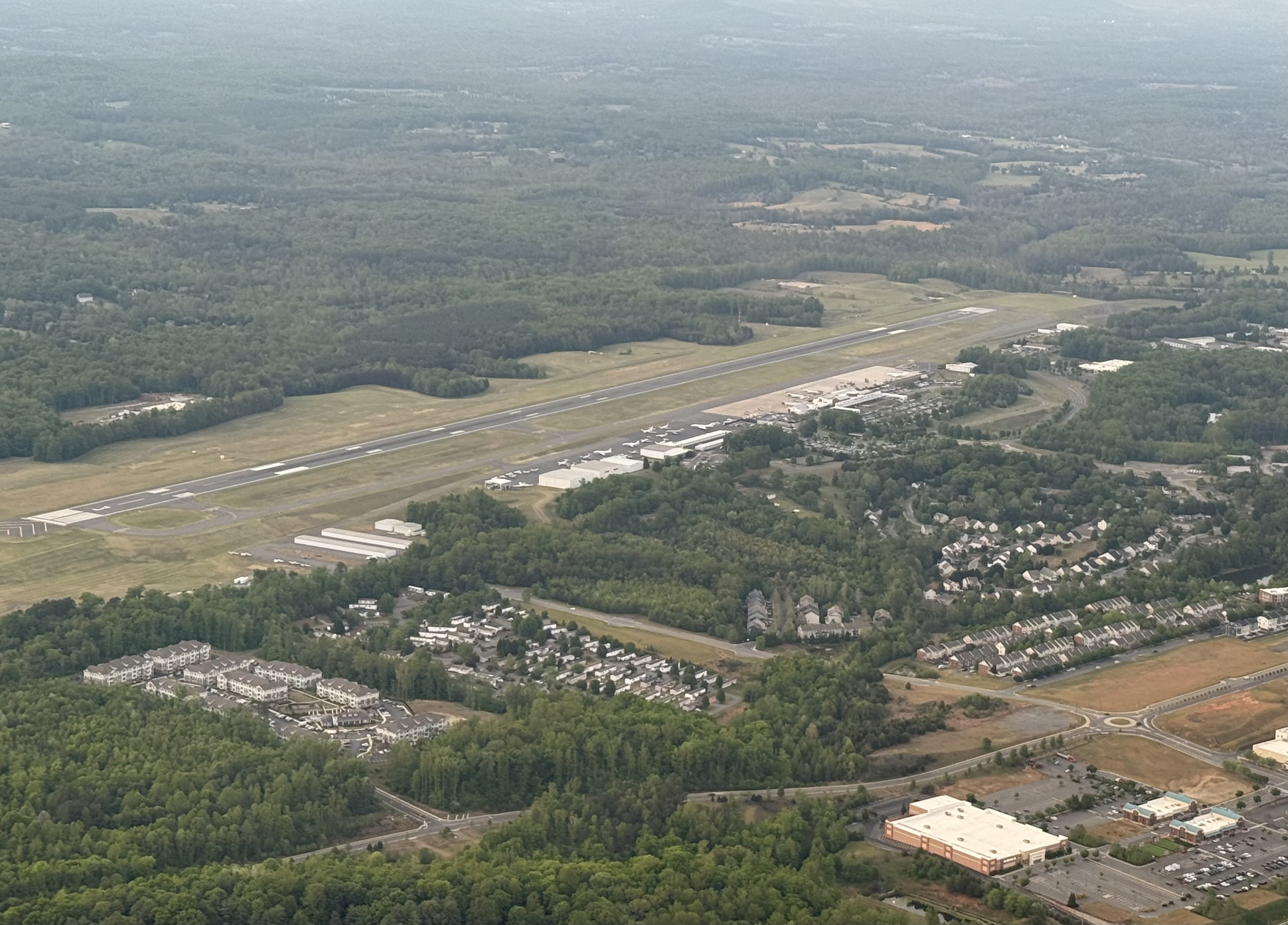
- IATA: CHO; ICAO: KCHO; FAA LID: CHO

Summary
- Airport type: Public
- Owner: Charlottesville-Albemarle Airport Authority
- Serves: Charlottesville, Virginia
- Location: Albemarle County, VA
- Elevation AMSL: 640 ft (200 m)
- Coordinates: 38°08′19″N 078°27′10″W
- Website: www.GoCHO.com

Map
- Location within Virginia Location within the United States

Runways
Direction	Length		Surface
Direction	ft	m	Surface
3/21	6,801	2,073	Asphalt

Statistics (Fiscal Year 2025)
- Passenger volume: 720,856
- Departing passengers: 361,571
- Scheduled flights: 6,981
- Aircraft operations: 133,014
- Based aircraft (2021): 56
- Source: Federal Aviation Administration, BTS, Charlottesville Albemarle Airport Authority

Charlottesville–Albemarle Airport (IATA: CHO, ICAO: KCHO, FAA LID: CHO) is an airport eight miles north of Charlottesville, in Albemarle County, Virginia, United States. It opened in 1955 and serves the Central Virginia and Shenandoah Valley region with non-stop flights to five major cities on three airlines' subsidiaries. CHO underwent major construction in summer 2006; an 800-foot runway extension began in summer 2010 and was completed in December 2012.

The Federal Aviation Administration (FAA) National Plan of Integrated Airport Systems for 2021–2025 categorized it as a non-hub primary commercial service facility. Federal Aviation Administration records say it had 214,395 passenger boardings (enplanements) in calendar year 2021 and 262,889 in 2022. The Charlottesville Albemarle Airport Authority says there were 628,611 total passengers (enplaned and deplaned) in fiscal year 2017.

Piedmont Airlines DC-3s arrived in 1955; the first jets were Piedmont 727s in 1967 (the runway was extended from 4661 ft to 6000 ft at about that time).

As of July 2026, the airport was served by ERJ-145, E175, CRJ-700, CRJ-900, and B717-200 aircraft.

== Facilities ==
The airport covers 710 acres (287 ha) at an elevation of 640 feet (195 m). Its single runway, 3/21, is 6,801 by 150 feet (2,073 m × 46 m) long.

The airport has a 60,000 sq ft (6,000 m^{2}) terminal with on-site rental cars (Enterprise, Avis, Budget, Hertz, & National) and other ground transportation.

Food Service is available through Tailwind Concessions under the brands Turbo Grill, Radar Bar, and Copilot Coffee. There is a gift shop selling grab and go food and local gifts on the second level at Gate 5.

General aviation facilities include an executive terminal offering a full-service by the fixed-base operator, Signature Flight Support, flight schools, emergency medical transportation provided by the UVA Hospital's Pegasus service and aircraft charter firms.

In 2019 the airport opened "The Founder's Lounge", which is a quiet lounge area at gate 5. Access is available to anyone who purchases a day pass for a nominal fee. It features comfortable seating, conference room, tables, and décor from local artists and craftsman showcasing the Charlottesville area. Complimentary beverages and snacks are also included.

In 2020 the airport had 90,555 aircraft operations, average 248 per day: 67% general aviation, 19% air taxi, 11% military, and 3% airline. In January 2022, 56 aircraft were based at this airport: 40 single-engine, 8 multi-engine, 6 jet, 1 helicopter, and 1 ultralight.

In 2022, 2 new elevator banks were opened in the Long-term parking lot to replace the older elevator to improve ADA compliance.

In 2023, the airport completed an upgrade of their airfield lighting, which switched to all LED lighting. This will help to reduce maintenance, improve visibility, and reduce electric costs. Following the return of flights to Chicago–O'Hare in August, it was announced that the airport intends to construct a new terminal and parking garage by the end of the decade.

== Airlines and destinations ==
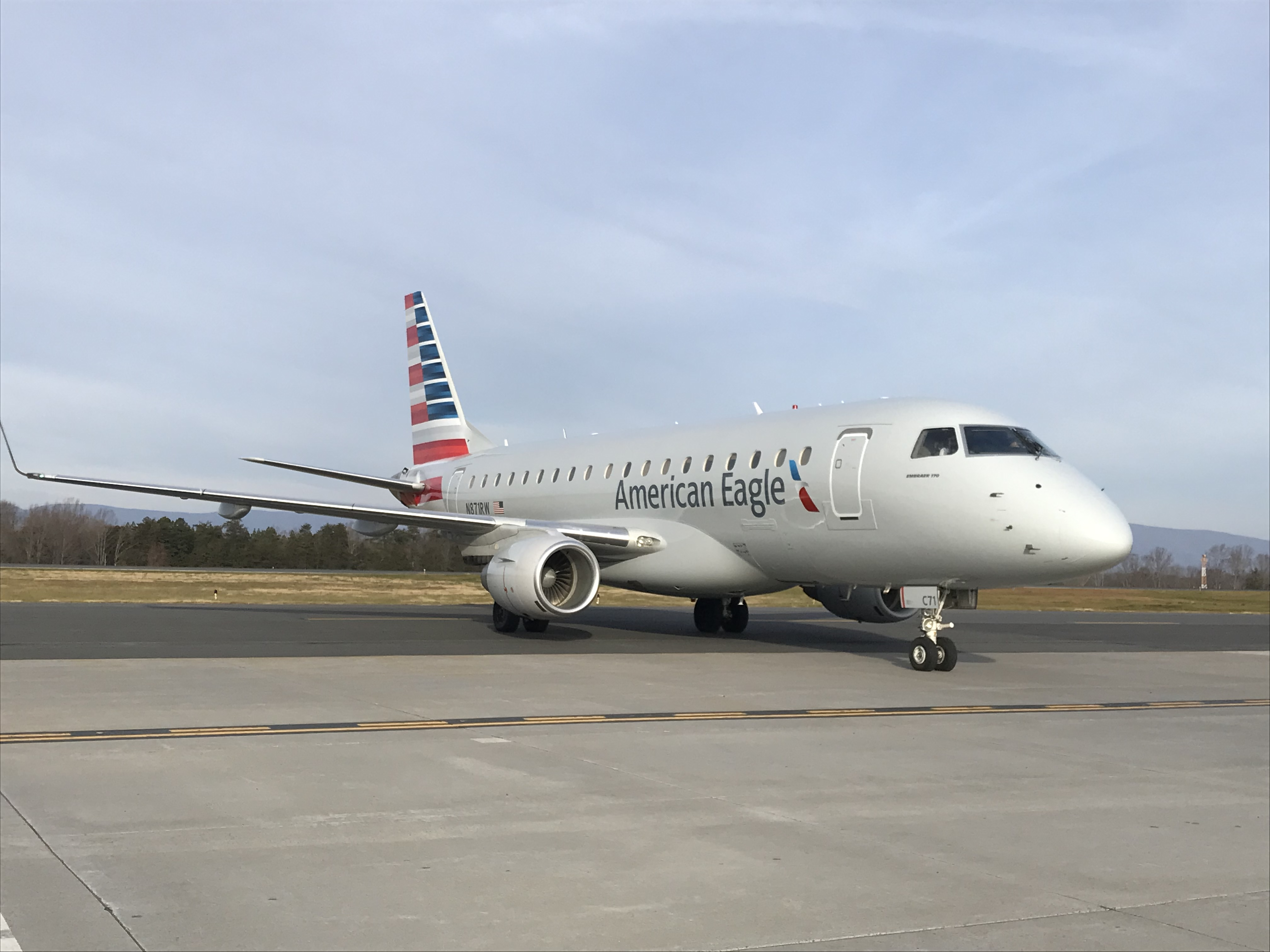
American Eagle E-170 in October 2021

=== Passenger ===
Airlines	Destinations	Refs
American Eagle	Charlotte, Chicago–O'Hare, New York–LaGuardia	
Delta Air Lines	Seasonal: Atlanta	
Delta Connection	Atlanta, New York–LaGuardia	
United Express	Chicago–O'Hare, Newark, Washington–Dulles	

== Statistics ==
=== Top routes ===
Busiest domestic routes from CHO (April 2025 – March 2026)
Rank	City	Passengers	Top carriers
1	Charlotte, North Carolina	109,650	American
2	Atlanta, Georgia	91,770	Delta
3	New York–LaGuardia, New York	53,560	American, Delta
4	Washington–Dulles, Virginia	46,440	United
5	Chicago–O'Hare, Illinois	44,370	United

=== Carrier shares ===
Carrier shares (April 2025 – March 2026)
Carrier	Passengers (arriving and departing)
Endeavor	223,000(32.46%)
Piedmont	216,000(31.51%)
CommuteAir	90,780(13.21%)
SkyWest	88,880(12.94%)
Delta	36,270(5.28%)
Other	31,600(4.60%)

== Former airlines and destinations ==
List of former airlines and routes at CHO
Airline	Destination	IATA	Notes
American Eagle	Philadelphia	PHL	Service began in 1997 by US Airways and continued after its merger with American Airlines. Suspended November 2021 following the COVID-19 pandemic. American Eagle resumed flights to Philadelphia on April 4, 2023, but ended service January 7, 2024
Avelo Airlines	Orlando	MCO	Operated twice weekly beginning May 3, 2023; Canceled September 4, 2023, citing low demand
United Express	Chicago–O'Hare	ORD	Began June 8, 2017; Suspended starting June 2022 but resumed August 2, 2023
American Eagle	Chicago–O'Hare	ORD	Began June 9, 2011 as first AA service since at least 1995; Ended April 5, 2021, due to the COVID-19 pandemic
Allegiant Air	Orlando–Sanford	SFB	Operated from November 21, 2013 to February 23, 2014
Northwest Airlink/ Delta Connection	Detroit	DTW	Served briefly from August to October 2001; Resumed by Northwest April 4, 2005; Continued after Delta Air Lines–Northwest Airlines merger, operated as Delta Connection until canceled in 2010
Delta Connection	Cincinnati	CVG	Route canceled in 2009 around the time of Delta's merger with Northwest Airlines
USAir	Pittsburgh	PIT	Operated by USAir and its Allegheny Airlines commuter service from 1984 until US Airways closed its Pittsburgh hub in 2004.
Continental Connection	New York–LaGuardia	LGA	Operated by Colgan Air as of June 1999
Continental Express	Newark	EWR	Operated as of April 1997, unknown end date.
Continental Express	Washington–Dulles	IAD	Operated as of April 1997, unknown end date.
USAir	Salisbury	SBY	Operated as of April 1995
American Eagle	Raleigh-Durham	RDU	One-stop service via Richmond began when American opened its Raleigh hub in 1987; timetables show nonstop service later that year before ending Charlottesville as a destination by 1988. American Eagle resumed nonstop service in 1991 and continued until late 1994.
USAir	Baltimore	BWI	Operated by Piedmont Airlines starting in 1983, continued by USAir after merging with Piedmont until late 1996.
United Express	Lynchburg	LYH	Operated by Atlantic Coast Airlines as of October 1993, unknown end date.
USAir	Roanoke	ROA	Ended around 1991 due to a lack of demand.
USAir	Hot Springs	HSP	Operated as of October 1991
Allegheny Commuter	Pittsburgh	PIT	Operated as of February 1985
Air Virginia	Washington–National	DCA	Operated as of February 1985
Piedmont Airlines	Norfolk	ORF	Operated as of April 1981
Air Virginia	Richmond	RIC	Operated as of April 1981
Air Virginia	Pittsburgh	PIT	Operated as of April 1981
Air Virginia	Baltimore	BWI	Operated from around November 1979 to April 1981.
Air Virginia	Roanoke	ROA	Operated from around November 1979 to April 1981.
Air Virginia	Lynchburg	LYH	Operated from around November 1979 to April 1981.
Air Virginia	Washington–Dulles	IAD	Operated from around November 1979 to April 1981.
Piedmont Airlines	Washington–Dulles	IAD	
Piedmont Airlines	Winston-Salem	INT	Operated from around November 1979 to April 1981.
Piedmont Airlines	Lynchburg	LYH	Operated from around April 1975 to February 1985.
Piedmont Airlines	Shenandoah	SHD	
Piedmont Airlines	Fayetteville	FAY	
Piedmont Airlines	Hot Springs	HSP	
Piedmont Airlines	Richmond	RIC	Scheduled as a daily flight in 1983
Piedmont Airlines	Washington–National	DCA	Dates unknown, operated in 1950s

== Accidents and incidents ==
- Piedmont Airlines Flight 349 crashed on October 30, 1959, into Bucks Elbow Mountain while attempting to land at this airport, killing 26 of 27 people on board.

== The White Oak ==
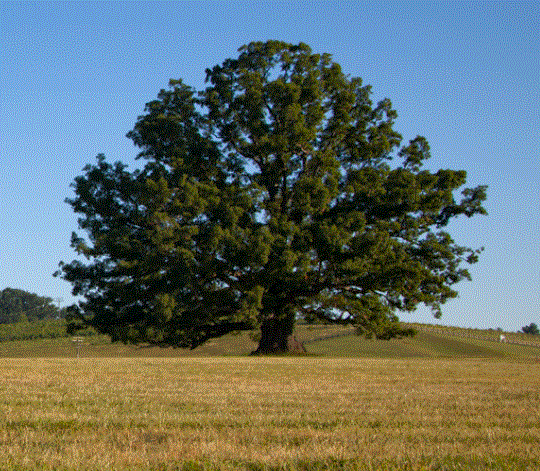
The White Oak Tree at CHO Airport

The tree is the second-largest white oak in Virginia, standing 75 feet tall with an 85-foot crown. It is located on the southernmost point of airport property along the approach to Runway 3. It is believed to be between 250 and 300 years old. Furthermore, it is included in Virginia Tech's Virginia Big Tree Database and also the Remarkable Trees of Virginia Program.

Access to the tree is restricted as it is in a secure section of the airport, but visits can be scheduled on the airport's website.
