= Rapid City Regional Airport =

Commercial airport serving Rapid City and the Black Hills in western South Dakota

- IATA: RAP; ICAO: KRAP; FAA LID: RAP

Summary
- Airport type: Public
- Owner: City of Rapid City
- Operator: Rapid City Regional Airport Board
- Serves: Rapid City, South Dakota
- Elevation AMSL: 3,203 ft (976 m)
- Coordinates: 44°02′43″N 103°03′26″W
- Website: www.rapairport.com/

Map
- Interactive map of Rapid City Regional Airport

Runways
Direction	Length		Surface
Direction	ft	m	Surface
14/32	8,701	2,652	Concrete
5/23	3,601	1,098	Asphalt

Statistics (2023)
- Aircraft operations: 44,743
- Based aircraft: 124
- Total passengers: 702,581
- Source: Rapid City Regional Airport, Federal Aviation Administration

Rapid City Regional Airport (IATA: RAP, ICAO: KRAP, FAA LID: RAP) is a public use airport, nine miles southeast of Rapid City, in Pennington County, South Dakota, United States.

It is included in the Federal Aviation Administration (FAA) National Plan of Integrated Airport Systems for 2023–2027, in which it is categorized as a small-hub primary commercial service facility.

It is the closest commercial airport to Mount Rushmore (located approximately 31.7 miles (51.0 km) away by driving distance) and is the main gateway airport to the Black Hills and Western South Dakota.

== Facilities ==
The airport covers 1,655 acres (6.70 km^{2}) at an elevation of 3,203 feet (976 m). It has two runways: 14/32 is 8,701 by 150 feet (2,652 by 46 m) concrete and 5/23 is 3,601 by 75 feet (1,098 by 23 m) asphalt. A near-parallel grass runway (13/31, 2,400 by 100 feet (732 by 30 m)) exists approximately 2,400 feet from Runway 14/32; this runway, however, belongs to Dan's Airport (FAA LID: 4SD4), a small private airport.

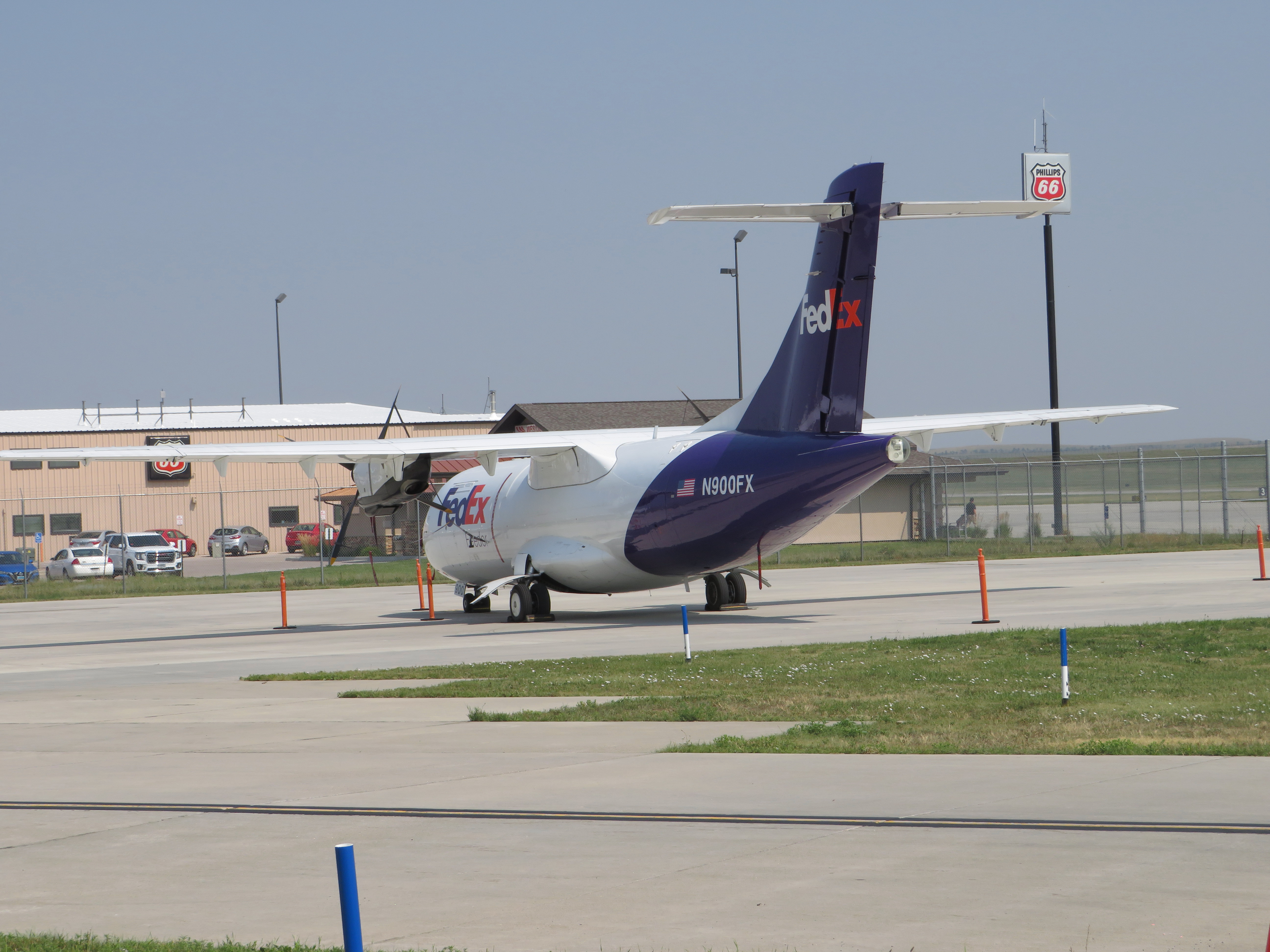
A FedEx ATR-42-600 at the cargo ramp at Rapid City.

2021 Total Commercial Passengers: 690,740

== Terminal ==
The current terminal building opened in 1988; a $20.5 million expansion and renovation designed by TSP Architecture was completed in 2012. It includes 12,000 square feet of new floor space, the addition of three jet bridges and one boarding gate, an expanded security area with room for up to three lanes and body scanners, a new rental car wing, additional seating in the concourse, larger restrooms before and after security, modernized phone and data systems, new flight information boards, improved food service and shopping areas in the concourse, a rooftop patio, and energy-efficient windows and building exterior repair.

The Rapid City area has had a municipal airport since 1924. The first airport was situated near the railroad tracks along East North Street and was later dedicated as Halley Field Airport in 1929. In 1937, the Rapid City Municipal Airport was established at the current location of Ellsworth Air Force Base, before being relocated to its present site in 1950. The airport was renamed Rapid City Regional Airport in 1980, and a new terminal was opened in November 1988. The original 1950 terminal was demolished in 2016.

== Airlines and destinations ==
=== Passenger ===
Airlines	Destinations
Allegiant Air	Las Vegas, Phoenix/Mesa
American Airlines	Seasonal: Charlotte
American Eagle	Dallas/Fort Worth; Seasonal: Charlotte, Chicago–O'Hare, Phoenix–Sky Harbor
Delta Connection	Minneapolis/St. Paul
United Airlines	Denver; Seasonal: Chicago–O'Hare
United Express	Denver; Seasonal: Chicago–O'Hare

=== Cargo ===
Airlines	Destinations
Alpine Air Express	Sioux Falls
FedEx Feeder operated by Empire Airlines	Sioux Falls

Destinations map
All passenger destinations from Rapid City Regional Airport (RAP)
Red = Year-round destination
Green = Seasonal destination
Blue = Future destination

=== Historical airline service ===
Since 2020, several destinations have been cut from the airport's schedule and have not returned. Most of these routes were seasonal flights offered during the summer, with Allegiant Air offering flights from select cities for the Sturgis Motorcycle Rally in August 2021. The terminated destinations included Appleton, Grand Rapids, Indianapolis, Knoxville, Nashville, Peoria, Pittsburgh, and Punta Gorda (operated by Allegiant), New York-LaGuardia and Phoenix-Sky Harbor (operated by American Eagle), Atlanta and Detroit (operated by Delta Air Lines), Salt Lake City (operated by Delta Connection), and Houston, Newark, Los Angeles, and San Francisco (operated by United Express). United returned seasonal service from San Francisco for the 2024 Sturgis Rally, using the Embraer E175. Delta announced the return of the Atlanta route in December 2024, which began on May 24, 2025.

== Statistics ==
=== Carrier shares ===
Carrier shares (August 2025 – July 2026)
Rank	Carrier	Passengers	% of market
1	SkyWest	300,000	32.97%
2	United	232,000	25.50%
3	Envoy	175,000	19.30%
4	Allegiant	97,180	10.69%
5	Endeavor	84,670	9.32%
	Other	20,230	2.23%

=== Top destinations ===
Busiest domestic routes from RAP (August 2025 – July 2026)
Rank	City	Passengers	Carriers
1	Denver, Colorado	190,720	United
2	Minneapolis/St. Paul, Minnesota	79,100	Delta, Sun Country
3	Dallas/Fort Worth, Texas	62,920	American
4	Chicago–O’Hare, Illinois	55,660	American, United
5	Phoenix/Mesa, Arizona	30,090	Allegiant
6	Las Vegas, Nevada	14,050	Allegiant
7	Charlotte, North Carolina	9,130	American
8	Orlando/Sanford, Florida	4,700	Allegiant
9	Phoenix, Arizona	3,860	American
10	Atlanta, Georgia	2,700	Delta

== Ground transportation ==
As of 2022, there is no public transit to Rapid City Regional Airport. The nearest Rapid City Rapid Ride bus stop is located over six miles away. Lyft, Wridz and Uber are rideshare transportation options. Taxis are available from Rapid Cab. Six car rental counters are available in the terminal.

== See also ==
- List of airports in South Dakota
