= Hilton Head Airport =

Airport in South Carolina, United States

Hilton Head Island Airport
- IATA: HHH; ICAO: KHXD; FAA LID: HXD

Summary
- Airport type: Public
- Owner: Beaufort County
- Serves: Hilton Head Island, South Carolina
- Elevation AMSL: 19 ft (5.8 m)
- Coordinates: 32°13′28″N 080°41′51″W
- Website: www.hiltonheadairport.com

Map
- Location within South Carolina Location within the United States

Runways
Direction	Length		Surface
Direction	ft	m	Surface
3/21	5,000	1,524	Asphalt

Statistics
- Aircraft operations (2018): 37,632
- Based aircraft (2018): 89
- Scheduled departures (2019): 1,595
- Commercial passengers (2018): 75,620
- Freight/mail (lb.) (2019): 1,587
- Source: Federal Aviation Administration

Hilton Head Airport (IATA: HHH, ICAO: KHXD, FAA LID: HXD) is on Hilton Head Island, in Beaufort County, South Carolina, United States. Also known as Hilton Head Island Airport, it is owned by Beaufort County.

In the spring of 2019, United Airlines began seasonal service to its hubs at Chicago-O’Hare, Newark, and Washington-Dulles, and American Airlines added seasonal service to its Washington-National hub to its existing service to Charlotte. Growth continued in May 2019, when Delta Air Lines resumed year-round service to its hub in Atlanta, as well as adding a new seasonal route to New York-LaGuardia. All of these flights are operated by regional affiliates. One public charter airline operates limited service. It is the only airport on Hilton Head Island.

The National Plan of Integrated Airport Systems for 2017–2021 categorized it as a primary commercial service airport. USDOT records say the airport had 56,330 passengers in calendar year 2017.

Many U.S. airports use the same three-letter location identifier for the FAA and IATA, but this airport is HXD to the FAA and HHH to the IATA. The IATA code HHH is used for airline booking.

== History ==
Hilton Head Island has been known for championship golf courses for decades. In the 1960s, it was decided that an airport would allow an increase in the number of visitors to the island. Hilton Head Island Airport opened in 1967 after Arnold Palmer told Charles E. Fraser that he would play golf on Hilton Head if there was an airport for him to land at. On July 5, 2018, Piedmont Airlines’ Bombardier Dash 8 service ceased, and Republic Airways began serving Hilton Head Airport with the E175 regional jet. This marked the first commercially scheduled jet service to the airport.

In the past the airport was served by the following air carriers operating scheduled passenger flights:

- 1972 - 1977: Air South (Georgia) with service to Atlanta operated with a Fairchild F-27.

== Facilities ==
Hilton Head Island Airport covers 180 acres (53 ha) at an elevation of 19 feet (6 m). Its one runway, 3/21, is 5,000 by 100 feet (1,524 x 30 m). The runway was extended from 4,300 feet to 5,000 feet in the summer of 2018. The FAA had recommended the runway be extended to 5,300 feet but public opinion on Hilton Head Island necessitated a smaller extension. In October 2010, the airport adopted a master plan that called for a 5,400 feet extension. However, that did not come to fruition.

Other safety improvements to the airport have been completed since 2018, including the relocation of Taxiway A by 100 feet, added airfield drainage components, removal of trees in the flight path and the revision of the general aviation parking area.

The current terminal building was built in 1995. At 18,000 square feet (1,700 m^{2}), it has four airline gates. In 2023, the airport began construction on a terminal improvement project. The project includes a new TSA checkpoint, new boarding areas, and the addition of three jet bridges. The new terminal opened on May 1, 2026.

== Airlines and destinations ==
=== Passenger ===
Airlines	Destinations
American Eagle	Charlotte; Seasonal: Boston, Chicago–O'Hare, Philadelphia, Washington–National
Delta Connection	Seasonal: Atlanta, New York–LaGuardia
United Express	Seasonal: Chicago–O'Hare, Newark

Destinations map
Destinations from Hilton Head Airport
Red = Year-round destination
Green = Seasonal destination
Blue = Future destination

== Statistics ==
=== Top destinations ===
Busiest domestic routes from HHH (August 2025 – July 2026)
Rank	City	Passengers	Carriers
1	Charlotte, North Carolina	67,900	American
2	Washington–Reagan, Virginia	14,400	American
3	Atlanta, Georgia	11,860	Delta
4	Newark, New Jersey	9,910	United
5	Chicago–O'Hare, Illinois	9,870	American, United
6	New York-LaGuardia, New York	8,150	Delta
7	Philadelphia, Pennsylvania	1,950	American
8	Boston, Massachusetts	550	American

=== Annual traffic ===
Annual passenger traffic (2003 – 2020)
Year	Passengers	Year	Passengers
2020	146,000	2010	151,000
2019	221,000	2009	136,000
2018	75,620	2008	161,000
2017	56,330	2007	172,000
2016	64,700	2006	126,000
2015	79,000	2005	135,000
2014	112,000	2004	128,000
2013	117,000	2003	123,000
2012	122,000	2002	
2011	123,000	2001	

Airline market share (August 2025 – July 2026)
Rank	Airline	Passengers	Market share
1	Envoy	153,000	60.50%
2	Republic	99,830	39.50%

== See also ==
- List of airports in South Carolina
