= Albert J. Ellis Airport =

Airport in North Carolina, U.S.

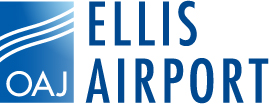

- IATA: OAJ; ICAO: KOAJ; FAA LID: OAJ

Summary
- Airport type: Public
- Owner: Onslow County
- Serves: Jacksonville, North Carolina
- Location: 264 Albert Ellis Airport Road; Richlands, North Carolina
- Elevation AMSL: 94 ft (29 m)
- Coordinates: 34°49′45″N 077°36′44″W
- Website: www.flyoaj.com

Maps
- FAA diagram as of January 2021
- Location within North Carolina Location within the United States

Runways
Direction	Length		Surface
Direction	ft	m	Surface
5/23	7,100	2,164	Asphalt

Statistics
- Aircraft operations (2020): 29,544
- Based aircraft (2020): 26
- Sources: FAA and airport website

Albert J. Ellis Airport (IATA: OAJ, ICAO: KOAJ, FAA LID: OAJ) is a county-owned public-use airport in Onslow County, North Carolina, United States. It is located in Richlands, 10 nautical miles (19 km) northwest of the central business district of Jacksonville and Marine Corps Base Camp Lejeune. The airport has a single runway and three gates. Opening on February 15, 1971, the airport is used by general aviation, the military and two commercial airlines, American Eagle and Delta Connection.

American Eagle operates services to Charlotte. These services are operated by PSA Airlines, which operates CRJ-700s and CRJ-900s, and Piedmont Airlines, which operates ERJ-145s.

On August 30, 2006, Delta Air Lines announced new service from the airport to Atlanta, Georgia, operated by Delta Connection carrier ExpressJet Airlines, starting on December 11, 2006. Delta began operating B-717 aircraft on the OAJ-ATL route on August 28, 2016. When ExpressJet closed, the service transferred to Endeavor Airlines.

== Facilities and aircraft ==
Albert J. Ellis Airport covers an area of 775 acres (314 ha) at an elevation of 94 ft (29 m) above mean sea level. It has one runway designated 5/23 with an asphalt surface measuring 7,100 by 150 ft (2,164 by 46 m).

For the 12-month period ending May 31, 2020, the airport had 29,544 aircraft operations, an average of 81 per day: 35% military, 33% general aviation, 23% scheduled commercial and 9% air taxi. In December 2020, there were 26 aircraft based at this airport: 22 single-engine, 1 multi-engine and 3 helicopter.

The airport is served by a fixed-base operator, Skyport Aviation, which offers fueling, maintenance, flight instruction and aircraft rentals from the new 10,000-ft^{2} executive terminal, which opened in 2015.

In 2013, the airport began construction on a two-story, 67,000 sq ft (6,200 m^{2}) replacement passenger terminal building. The new terminal features passenger loading bridges, new concessions, expanded passenger areas and space for additional airlines. This is part of the airport's $50-million Terminal Area Redevelopment Program. The new terminal was topped off on June 10, 2014, and officially opened on August 19, 2015, National Aviation Day.

On December 6, 2017, the airport began construction on its first air traffic control tower. The six-story-tall tower opened on November 1, 2018.

The airport upgraded the lighting and signs on the runway and taxiways to LED in 2018/2019. A project to add a 900 ft (270 m) extension to the northeast end of the runway (lengthening the runway to 8,000 ft (2,400 m) total) is planned to begin in 2023, with construction beginning in 2025. Other projects to rehabilitate and expand airfield pavements are also planned to begin between 2023 and 2027.

== Airlines and destinations ==
Airlines	Destinations
American Eagle	Charlotte
Delta Connection	Atlanta

== Passenger statistics ==
Year	Passengers
2025	311,000
2024	289,000
2023	267,000
2022	273,000
2021	320,000
2020	212,444
2019	332,270
2018	308,553
2017	313,940
2016	303,288
2015	302,608
2014	321,642
2013	344,710
2012	352,455
2011	344,467
2010	314,883
2009	249,563
2008	262,178
2007	242,817
2006	179,878
2005	191,194
2004	151,257
2003	87,814
2002	65,210
2001	62,454
2000	77,342

=== Top nonstop destinations ===
Busiest domestic routes (September 2025 - August 2026)
Rank	City	Passengers
1	Atlanta, Georgia	73,790
2	Charlotte, North Carolina	70,550

== See also ==
- List of airports in North Carolina
