= Charlotte Douglas International Airport =

Airport serving Charlotte, North Carolina, United States

- An aerial view of the airport in 2012
- IATA: CLT; ICAO: KCLT; FAA LID: CLT; WMO: 72314

Summary
- Airport type: Public
- Owner/Operator: City of Charlotte
- Serves: Charlotte metropolitan area
- Location: 5501 Josh Birmingham Parkway; Charlotte, North Carolina, U.S.
- Opened: 1935; 91 years ago
- Hub for: American Airlines
- Time zone: EST (UTC−05:00)
  - Summer (DST): EDT (UTC−04:00)
- Elevation AMSL: 228 m (748 ft)
- Coordinates: 35°12′50″N 080°56′35″W
- Website: www.cltairport.com

Maps
- FAA airport diagram
- Interactive map of Charlotte Douglas; International Airport

Runways
Direction	Length		Surface
Direction	m	ft	Surface
18/36	2,645	8,676	Asphalt concrete
19L/1R	3,048	10,000	Concrete
19C/1C	3,048	10,000	Under construction
19R/1L	2,743	9,000	Concrete

Statistics (2025)
- Passengers (enplaned+deplaned): 53,574,392 ▼8.9%
- Aircraft operations: 574,193
- Total cargo (tons): 224,905
- Source: Charlotte Douglas International Airport

Charlotte Douglas International Airport (IATA: CLT, ICAO: KCLT, FAA LID: CLT) is an international airport serving Charlotte, North Carolina, United States, located roughly six miles (9.7 km) west of the city's central business district. Charlotte Douglas is the primary airport for commercial and military use in the Charlotte metropolitan area. Operated by the City of Charlotte's aviation department, the airport covers 5,558 acres (2,249 ha) of land.

Established in 1935 as Charlotte Municipal Airport, the airport was later renamed as Douglas Municipal Airport for Ben Elbert Douglas Sr., who was the mayor of Charlotte when the airport was first built. In 1982, the airport was renamed again, this time to its current Charlotte Douglas International Airport.

In 2019, CLT was the 11th-busiest airport in the United States in terms of passenger traffic, having processed over 50 million passengers, and fifth-busiest in terms of aircraft operations, ranking sixth globally. In 2021, CLT grew to the sixth busiest airport in the United States. Charlotte is a fortress hub for American Airlines, which operates the majority of the airport's flights. The airport has three operating runways and one passenger terminal, with 124 gates across five concourses. A commercial-civil-military facility, the airport is home to the Charlotte Air National Guard base and its host unit, the 145th Airlift Wing of the North Carolina Air National Guard.

== History ==
=== Early years ===
The city received Works Progress Administration funding to establish Charlotte's first municipal airport; the airport was, at the time, the largest single WPA project in the United States, incorporating a terminal, hangar, beacon tower and three runways.R

In 1936, Charlotte Municipal Airport opened, operated by the City of Charlotte; Eastern Air Lines began scheduled passenger service in 1937. The original passenger terminal still exists and is used for offices and training rooms by various aviation-related organizations.

The United States Army Air Forces took control of the airport and established Charlotte Air Base in early 1941, which was renamed Morris Field soon after the attack on Pearl Harbor. The US military invested more than $5 million in airfield improvements by the time the facility was returned to the City of Charlotte in 1946. The airfield was used by the Third Air Force for antisubmarine patrols and training.

=== 1950 to mid-1960s: into the jet age ===
In 1954, a 70,000-square-foot (6,500 m^{2}) passenger terminal opened and the airport was renamed Douglas Municipal Airport in honor of former Charlotte Mayor Ben Elbert Douglas Sr., who had overseen the airport's opening 20 years earlier. The terminal had two floors; passenger operations were confined to the ground floor. Ticketing and baggage claim were on each side of an open space that bisected the building north to south, and a mezzanine restaurant and airline offices overlooked this open space. Delta Air Lines began scheduled passenger service in 1956. The OAG for April 1957 shows 57 weekday departures on Eastern, seven on Piedmont, six on Capital, four on Delta and two on Southern. Nonstop flights did not reach beyond Newark, Pittsburgh, Columbus, Louisville, Birmingham, and Jacksonville.

Scheduled jet flights (Eastern Air Lines Boeing 720s) began in early 1962. Eastern used the west pier, Piedmont and Delta the center pier, and United and Southern used the east pier.

=== Late 1960s to 1978: before deregulation ===
A major renovation project in the late 1960s expanded the facility. Eastern opened a unit terminal in 1967, replacing the old west pier. This new facility had eight dedicated gates for Eastern, each with its own departure lounge, snack bar and separate baggage claim space. Eastern passengers continued to check in at the main terminal.

In 1969, a new enclosed concourse was built parallel to the center pier. When it was completed, Piedmont, Eastern, and Delta moved in and the old center pier was demolished. The new concourse had separate departure lounges, restrooms and an enlarged baggage claim area. United's flights continued to use the east pier, with an enclosed holding room added for waiting passengers. Eastern added two more gates to the end of its west concourse in 1973.

In April 1975, the airport had 97 weekday departures to 32 destinations on seven airlines.

=== 1978 to 1989: becoming a hub ===
After airline deregulation, passenger numbers at the terminal nearly doubled between 1978 and 1980, and a new 10,000-foot (3,000 m) parallel runway and control tower opened in 1979. The airport's master plan called for a new terminal across the runway from the existing site, with ground broken in 1979. At the time, the airport had only two concourses: one used exclusively by Eastern, and one used by other carriers, including United, Delta, Piedmont, and several commuter airlines.

In 1979, Piedmont Airlines chose Charlotte as the hub for its expanding network. A new 325,000-square-foot (30,200 m^{2}) passenger terminal, designed by Odell Associates, opened in 1982, and the airport was renamed Charlotte Douglas International Airport. Concourses B and C were expanded in 1987 and 1984 respectively, while Concourse A was built in 1986 to handle future growth.

In 1987, Piedmont started non-stop 767 flights to London. In the mid-1980s, the old terminal site was converted to a cargo center, and the central concourse and Eastern unit terminal were removed to make way for more cargo buildings. The original main building still stands and is used for office space. The old control tower was removed in the late 1990s. In 1989 Piedmont merged with USAir; the new merged operations kept the USAir name.

=== 1990 to 2013: the influence of US Airways ===
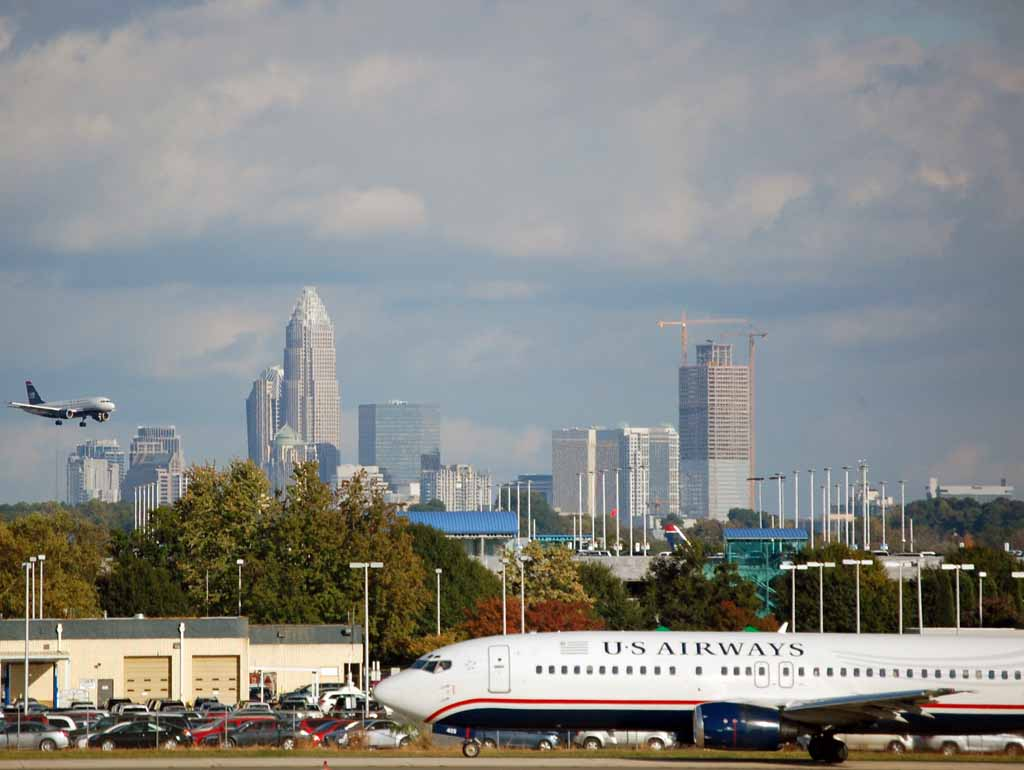
Charlotte skyline in 2008 from the airport

In 1990, a new 80,000-square-foot (7,400 m^{2}) international and commuter concourse (Concourse D) opened, and in 1991 further expansion of the central terminal building continued, reflective of USAir's dominating presence at the airport. A monumental bronze statue of Queen Charlotte of Mecklenburg-Strelitz (the namesake of the city), created by Raymond Kaskey, was placed in front of the main terminal.

In 1990, Lufthansa began Boeing 747-200 service to Charlotte, on a Frankfurt-Charlotte-Houston routing; however, this service was short-lived. In 1994, British Airways began service to London via a "global alliance" with USAir. This was later discontinued in 2002, as British Airways formed the Oneworld Alliance and USAir become a part of the Star Alliance (although USAir later joined Oneworld prior to merging with American). In 2003, Lufthansa restarted service to Charlotte, though now from Munich, utilizing their Airbus A340-300 fleet. Over time, this route has been flown by Airbus A340-600 and A330-300 aircraft, and is now regularly served by the Airbus A350-900.

In 1999, plans were announced for the construction of a regional carrier concourse (present-day Concourse E) and for the expansion of Concourses A and D. This expansion was designed by The Wilson Group and LS3P Associates Ltd. In 2002, the new 32-gate Concourse E opened. The airline closed its Concourse D US Airways Club location in 2002. In 2003, the main ticketing hall was expanded to the east, providing 13 additional ticketing counters and a new security checkpoint; Concourse D was expanded by an additional nine gates.

Following the 2005 acquisition of US Airways by America West Airlines in a reverse takeover, Charlotte remained the primary domestic hub for the airline. The majority of US Airways' international routes remained at the airline's second-largest hub, Philadelphia.

Between 2007 and 2015, the airport completed $1.5 billion worth of construction projects, part of which later became known as the "CLT 2015" plan. These projects included a new airport entrance roadway, new hourly parking decks with a centralized rental car facility, a regional intermodal cargo facility, an expansion of the east-side terminal lobby, new checked baggage handling systems, and additional space for concessions and shops.

Construction of the airport's fourth runway began in spring 2007. At 9,000 feet (2,700 m) long, the new "third parallel" allows three independent approaches for arrivals even from the south, potentially increasing capacity by a third. The new runway lies west of the three existing runways. The construction of the fourth runway required the relocation of parts of Wallace Neel Road (which had been the western boundary of the airport) to an alignment located farther to the west. Construction occurred in two phases. The first phase, which began in March 2007, included grading and drainage. The second phase included the paving and lighting of the runway. In August 2009, crews paved the last section.

With the merger of US Airways and American Airlines in 2013, Charlotte became the second-largest hub for the merged airline, after Dallas/Fort Worth.

=== 2013–present: post-merger growth and Destination CLT ===
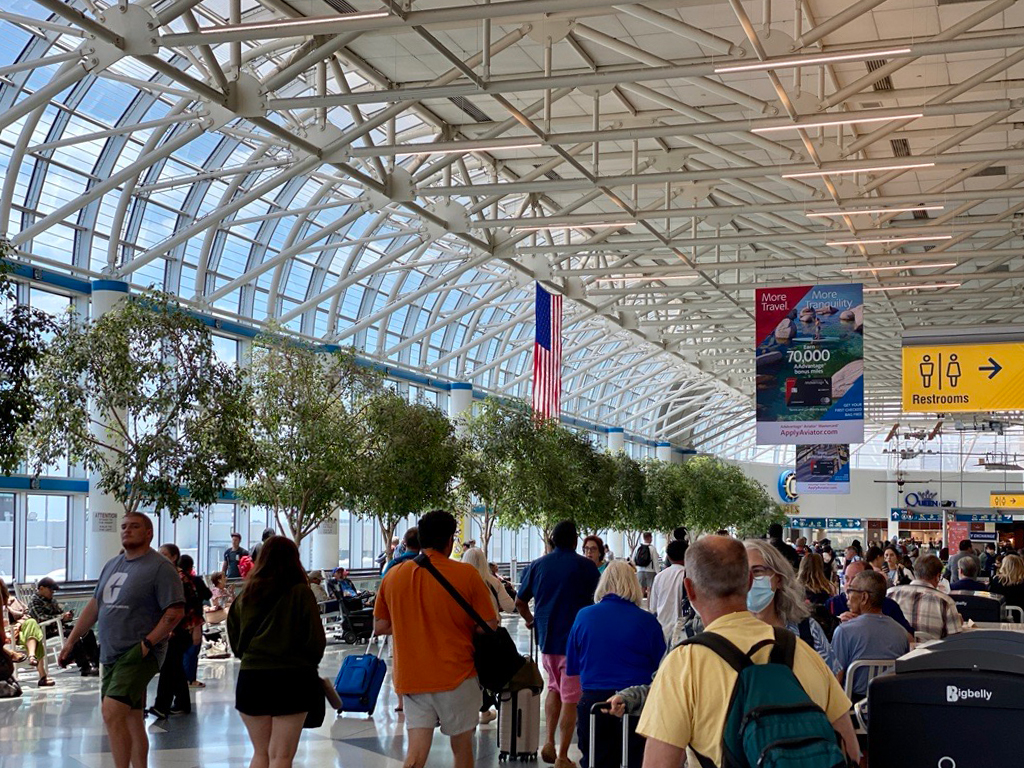
Main atrium of the airport

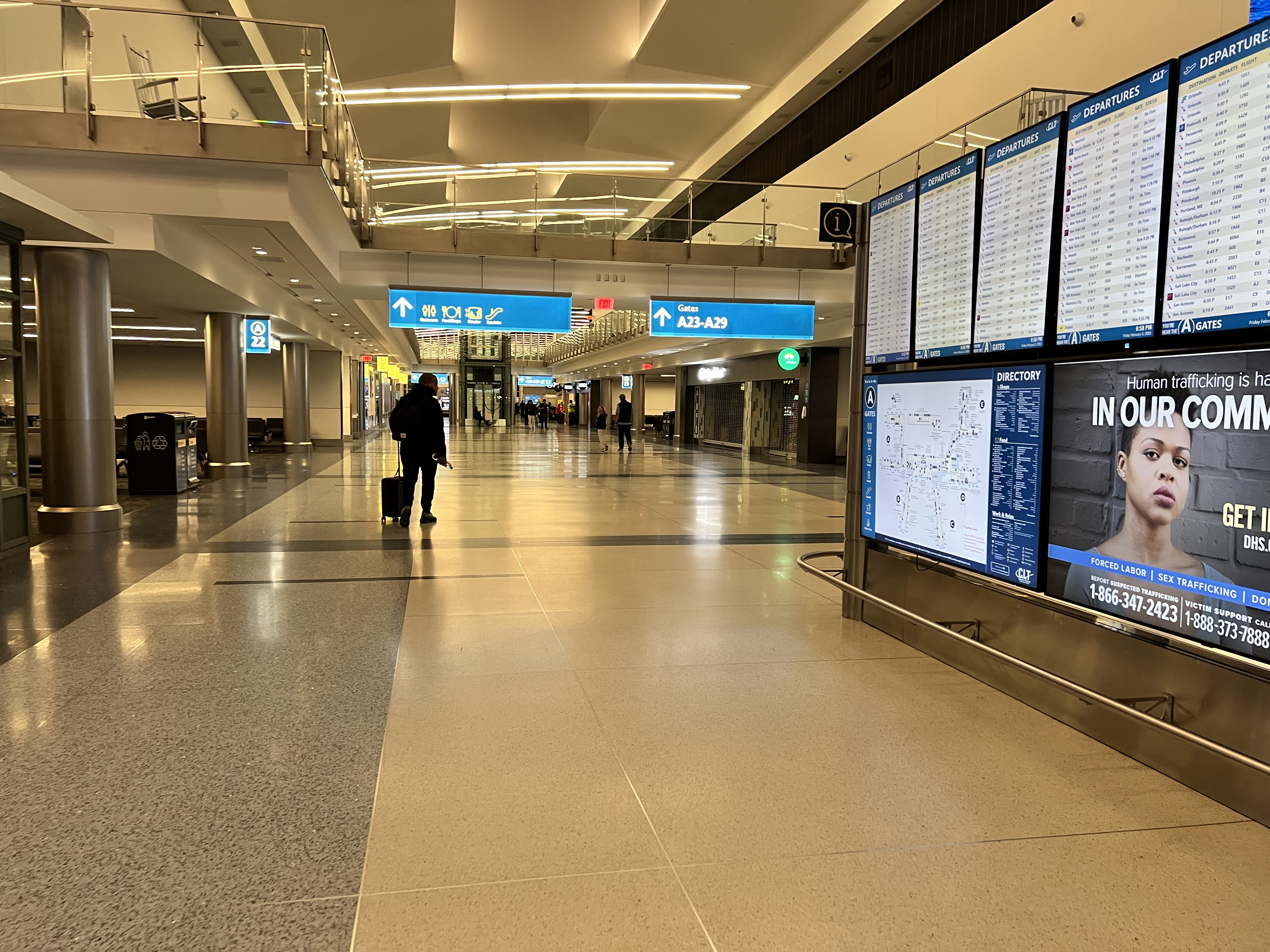
Concourse A of the airport

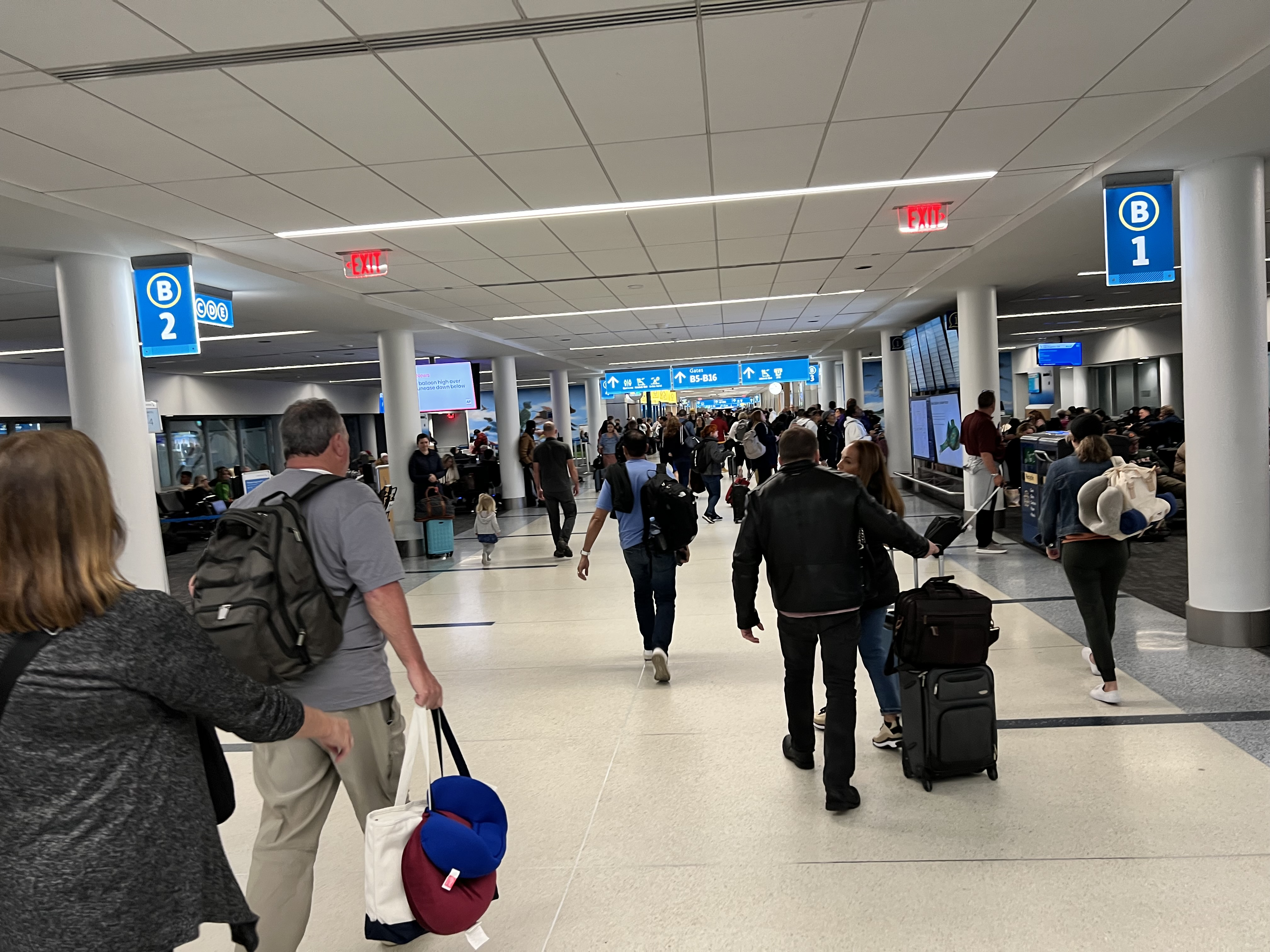
Concourse B of the airport

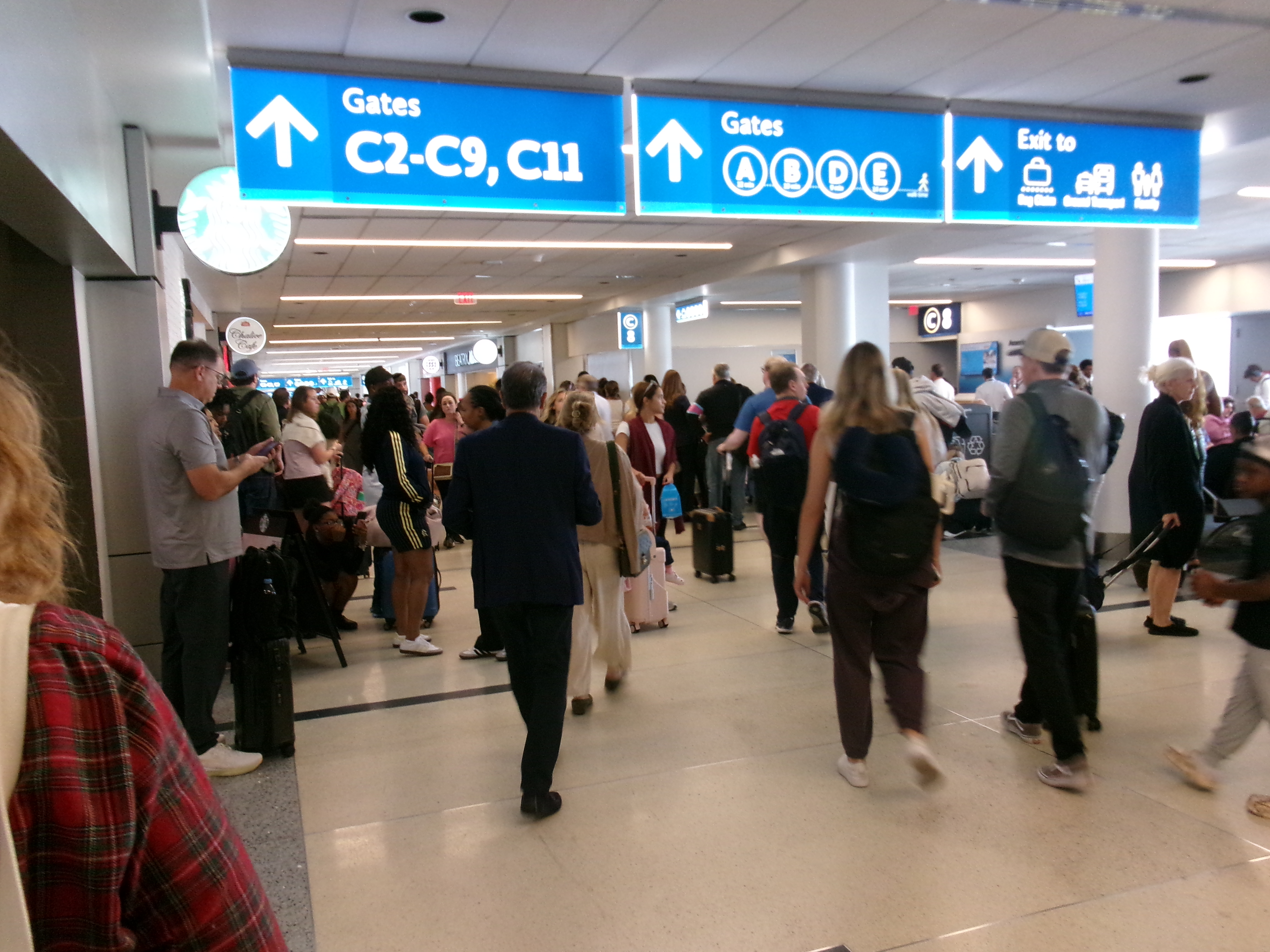
Concourse C of the airport

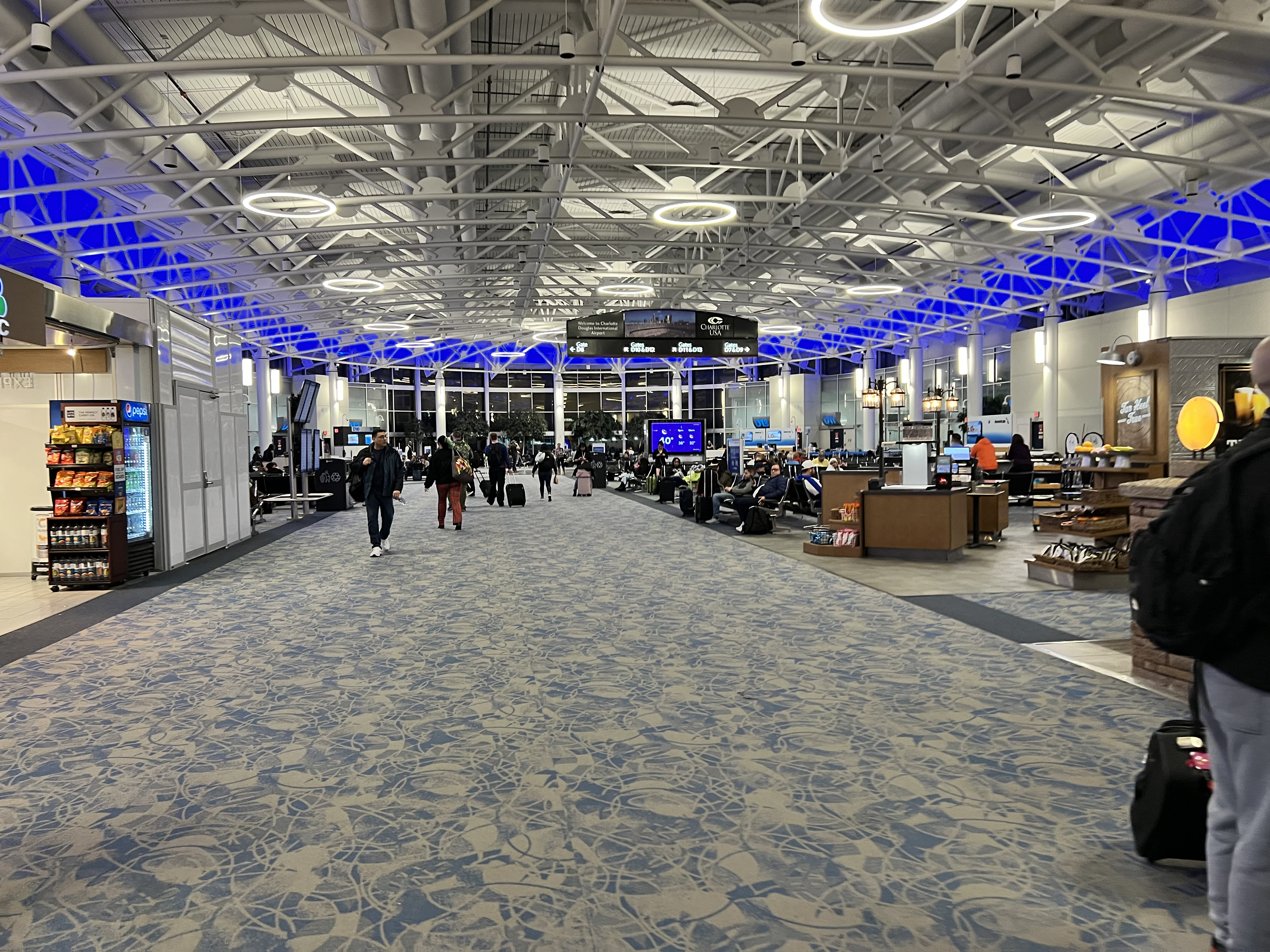
Concourse D of the airport

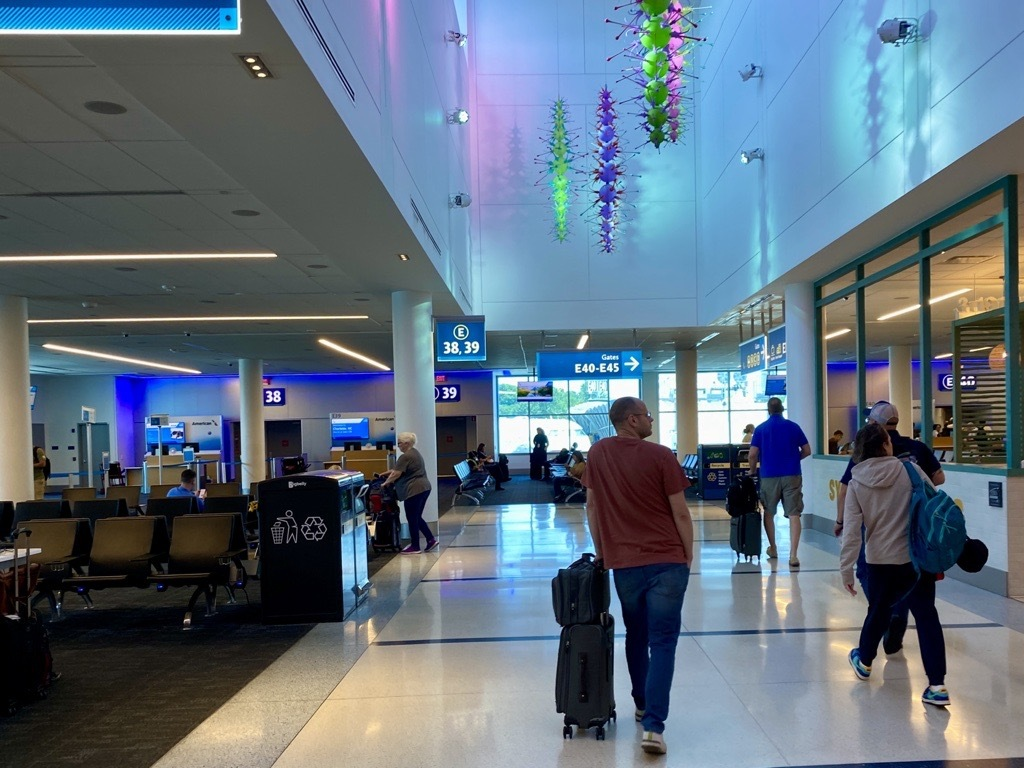
Concourse E of the airport

In 2015, airport officials formally announced the completion of the "CLT 2015" plan, and kicked off construction of the new Destination CLT airport development plan. Destination CLT represents a total $2.5 billion investment into the future growth of the airport.

Concourse A North, a nine-gate expansion of Concourse A, was completed in summer 2018. Air Canada, JetBlue, United, Southwest, Frontier, and Spirit moved their operations to Concourse A North upon its completion. A digital artwork titled "Interconnected," by Refik Anadol, is prominently featured on three massive display screens in Concourse A North. The artwork draws from the airport's data network of aircraft movements and turns the data into an always-changing visual artwork. The main 139-foot (42 m)-long screen is one of the largest digital artworks of its kind in the world.

In late 2019, the new terminal roadway was opened. The new roadway has sixteen lanes over two levels, with departures traffic using the elevated level and arrivals traffic utilizing the ground level. The eight lanes on each level are split into five outer lanes for personal vehicles, and three inner lanes for commercial and airport vehicles. Some components of the project, namely the skybridges from the hourly parking deck and rental car facility, the glass canopy over the roadway, and some lanes on the departure level will not be finished until the terminal lobby project is complete.

In November 2019, the East Terminal Expansion opened. The expansion added 51,000 square feet (4,700 m^{2}), primarily of passenger amenity space, across three levels. The main level of the expansion is "The Plaza", a food court. The Plaza's artistic centerpiece is a hanging artwork entitled "Loops" by Christian Moeller. "Loops" became a part of the project through a partnership between the airport and the Charlotte-Mecklenburg Arts and Science Council. The upper level of the East Terminal Expansion includes a Centurion Lounge.

The airport announced that it had served 50.2 million passengers in 2019, a new record for the airport.

Destination CLT includes a $90 million terminal renovation project of Concourses A, B, C, D, and the Atrium. Aspects of the renovations include the replacement of carpet with terrazzo, upgraded lighting, remodeled bathrooms, and new seats with charging in every seat. Concourse B renovations wrapped up in 2019.

With the conclusion of the terminal roadway and curb front construction, work on the terminal lobby renovation and expansion began. The $600 million project is projected to be completed in 2025. The project will consolidate existing security checkpoints A, B, C, D, and E into three larger and more efficient checkpoints. The baggage claim and ticketing areas will be completely gutted and remodeled. Raymond Kaskey's "Queen Charlotte" statue will be moved to a prominent position within the new "Queen's Court" area in the expanded lobby. After the lobby renovation and expansion is complete, a 146,000-square-foot (13,600 m^{2}) glass canopy will be constructed over the roadway and pedestrian skybridges and tunnels will be built connecting the terminal to the hourly parking/rental car facility complex.

Separate from the Destination CLT family of projects, the FAA is building a new 367-foot (112 m) control tower south of the CLT passenger terminal to replace the existing 150 feet (46 m) tower north of the terminal. When complete, the tower will be the second-tallest air traffic control tower in the United States and the ninth-tallest in the world. The new tower is now functioning and in use.

=== Future ===
Construction is currently underway on a fourth parallel runway between existing runways 19R/1L (formerly 18R/36L) and 19L/1R (formerly 18C/36C). The runway, projected to cost $1 billion, is slated to be 10,000 feet (3,000 m) long. Ground was broken in June 2023 and construction is expected to be completed in 2027. Previously, a 12,000-foot runway had been planned; however, the airport reversed course due to practicality and cost considerations.

Future terminal expansions included under the Destination CLT umbrella include Phase II of the Concourse A Expansion, Phase VIII of the Concourse E expansion, and expansions to Concourses B and C. These expansions are projected to cost roughly $1.1 billion and are not expected to be complete until 2026. 8–10 gates are expected to be added to Concourse B, 10–12 gates to Concourse C, and 10 gates in the expansion of Concourse A farther north. Phase VIII of the Concourse E expansion will add 34,000 square feet (3,200 m^{2}) of hold room to the concourse. This phase of the expansion accommodates gates already in operation; however, passengers must walk under temporary canopies to access the aircraft parked at these gates.

The proposed CATS LYNX Silver Line, tentatively planned to open in 2037, would bring light rail service to the airport. The airport plans to construct an automated people mover to connect the terminal to the light rail station, which will be located at the airport's Destination District just north of the terminal.

== Facilities ==
=== Terminal ===
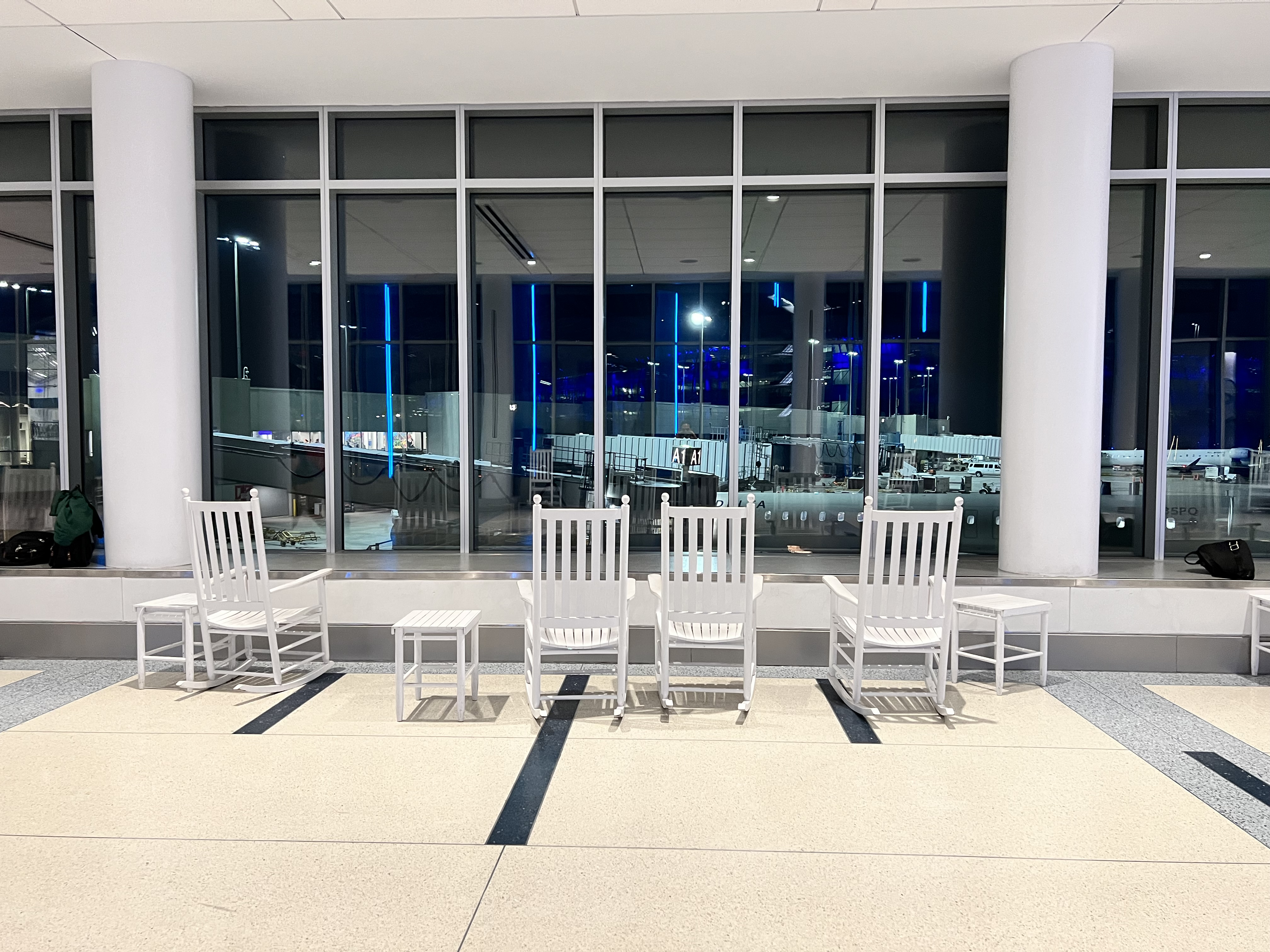
Airport rocking chairs

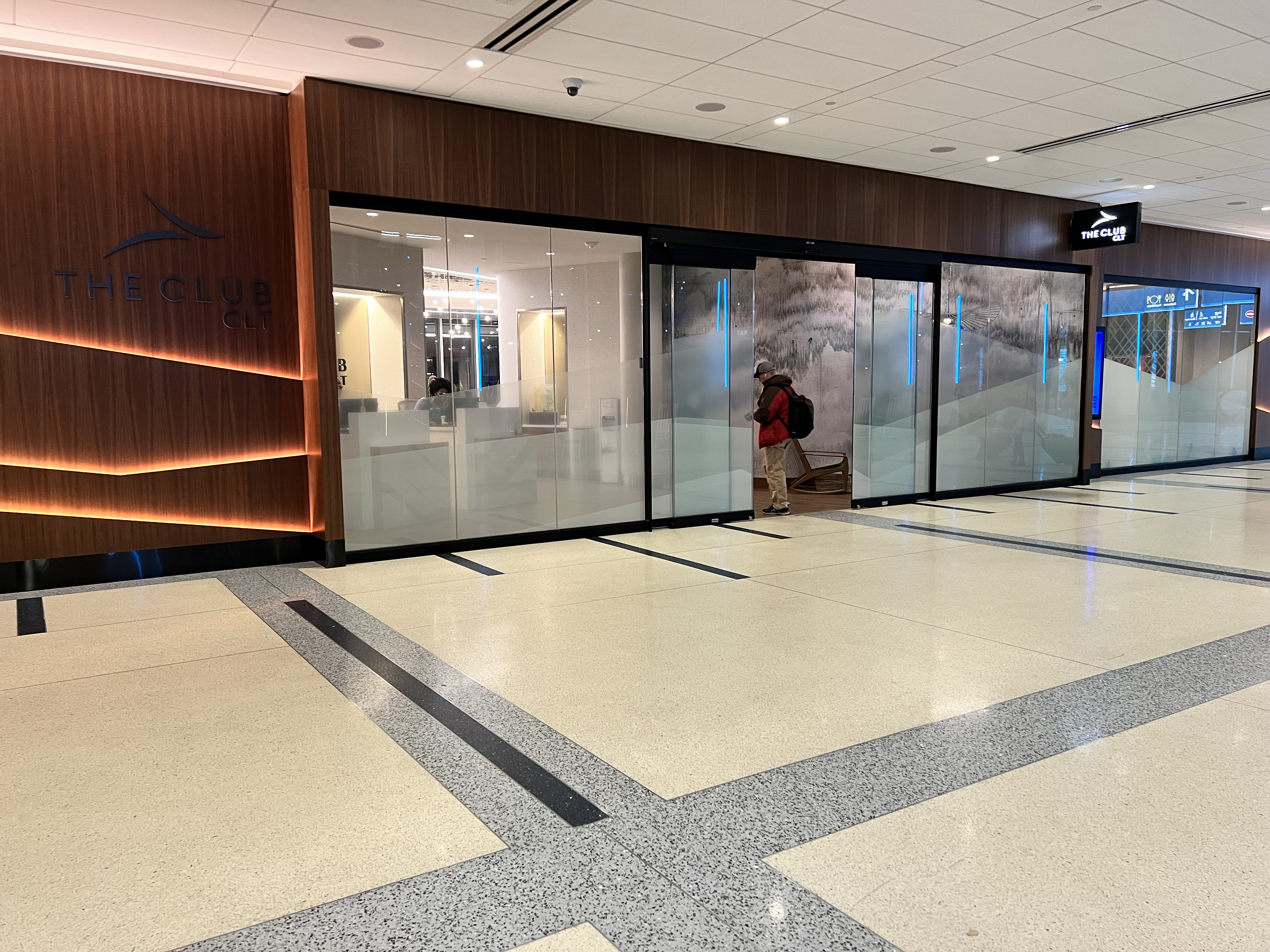
The Club VIP Lounge

CLT has one terminal with 124 gates on five concourses. All five concourses are connected to the central terminal building housing ticketing, security, and baggage claim.

- Concourse A has 32 gates. The main pier serves American while the two Concourse A North extension piers serve United, Southwest, Delta, Frontier, Sun Country, and Air Canada.
- Concourse B has 16 gates and serves exclusively American mainline domestic flights.
- Concourse C has 18 gates and serves exclusively American mainline domestic flights.
- Concourse D has 13 gates and serves American, Etihad, Lufthansa, and Volaris. All international flights without customs preclearance are processed at Concourse D.
- Concourse E has 45 gates. Concourse E is the home of American Eagle's CLT operation, which is the largest regional flight operation in the world. In spring of 2023, Contour, who has an interline agreement with American, moved its Essential Air Service flights into the E1-E3 gates in the concourse.

American has two Admirals Club locations in Concourses B & C. An American Express Centurion Lounge is located in the Plaza between Concourse D & E. The Club CLT Lounge is located on the walkway to the A North Concourse. It is accessible to Priority Pass and Lounge Key passholders as well as individuals purchasing a day pass. A new 14,000 square-foot Delta Sky Club is located in the new expansion of Concourse A.

=== Runways ===
CLT currently has three runways, with another under construction.

Runway	Length	Width	ILS	References
18/36	8,677 ft 2,645 m	150 ft 46 m	18 (Cat I), 36 (Cat IIIB)	
19L/1R	10,000 ft 3,000 m	150 ft 46 m	19L (Cat I), 1R (Cat IIIB)	
19C/1C	Under construction			
19R/1L	9,000 ft 2,700 m	150 ft 46 m	19R (Cat I), 1L (Cat IIIB)	

In 2026, the airport renumbered the runways ahead of the opening of the fourth runway. On May 14, 2026, 18R/36L became 19R/1L; on July 9, 2026, 18C/36C became 19L/1R; on September 3, 2026, 18L/36R became 18/36. The fourth runway will be designated 19C/1C.

=== Ground transportation ===
The airport terminal is located on Josh Birmingham Parkway, which connects with Wilkinson Boulevard (to I-485 and Uptown Charlotte), Little Rock Road (to I-85) and Billy Graham Parkway (to I-77).

The Charlotte Area Transit System (CATS) operates two bus routes from the airport terminal: Route 5-Airport (Sprinter) to Uptown Charlotte/CTC and Route 60-Tyvola Road to LYNX Tyvola station. There is also bus service to the air cargo center, maintenance facilities, and old terminal via Route 10-West Boulevard to the Charlotte Transportation Center in center city Charlotte. The proposed Lynx Silver Line would serve the airport, traveling along a route that largely follows the Sprinter route.

Located in front of the airport terminal, the Rental Car Facility operates on the three lower levels of the Hourly Deck and has a combined 3,000 cars from eight rental car companies. The level 2 lobby includes customer counters and kiosks from the following companies: Advantage, Alamo, Avis, Budget, Dollar, Enterprise, Hertz and National.

=== Other facilities ===
Charlotte Douglas International Airport is one of a small number of major "hub" airports in the world that has an aviation museum located on the field. Sullenberger Aviation Museum, established in 1992, has a collection of over 50 aircraft, including a DC-3 that is painted in Piedmont Airlines livery. The museum also has an aviation library with over 9,000 volumes and a very extensive photography collection. Rare aircraft in the collection include one of only two surviving Douglas D-558 Skystreak aircraft and the second (and oldest surviving) U.S.-built Harrier, which was used as the flight-test aircraft and accumulated over 5,000 flight-test hours. In January 2011, the museum acquired N106US, the US Airways Airbus A320 ditched by captain Chesley Sullenberger as US Airways Flight 1549 in the Hudson River on January 15, 2009. This aircraft, which was delivered on June 10, 2011, is about 35 years younger than any other commercial airliner on display in a museum.

Charlotte Douglas International Airport is one of the few airports in the United States with a public viewing area. Visitors can watch planes land and taxi to and from runway 18R/36L in addition to providing a view of runway 19L/1R and concourse A. There are also bathroom facilities, a location for food trucks, a restored F-4 Phantom II on display and a children's playground. The Overlook is a popular spot for aviation enthusiasts and plane spotters.

== Airlines and destinations ==
=== Passenger ===
Airlines	Destinations
Air Canada Express	Toronto–Pearson
Alaska Airlines	Seattle/Tacoma (begins June 10, 2027)
American Airlines	Albany, Aruba, Asheville, Atlanta, Austin, Baltimore, Barbados, Bermuda, Boston, Buffalo, Cancún, Cedar Rapids/Iowa City, Charleston (SC), Chicago–O'Hare, Cincinnati, Cleveland, Columbus–Glenn, Curaçao, Dallas/Fort Worth, Denver, Des Moines, Destin/Fort Walton Beach, Detroit, Fort Lauderdale, Fort Myers, Frankfurt, Grand Cayman, Grand Rapids, Greensboro, Greenville/Spartanburg, Harrisburg, Hartford, Houston–Intercontinental, Indianapolis, Jacksonville (FL), Kansas City, Key West, Las Vegas, Liberia (CR), London–Heathrow, Los Angeles, Louisville, Madison, Madrid, Memphis, Mexico City–Benito Juárez, Miami, Milwaukee, Minneapolis/St. Paul, Montego Bay, Munich, Myrtle Beach, Nashville, Nassau, New Orleans, New York–JFK, New York–LaGuardia, Newark, Norfolk, Oklahoma City, Omaha, Ontario, Orange County, Orlando, Pensacola, Philadelphia, Phoenix–Sky Harbor, Pittsburgh, Portland (ME), Portland (OR), Providence, Providenciales, Punta Cana, Raleigh/Durham, Richmond, Rochester (NY), Sacramento, St. Louis, St. Lucia–Hewanorra, St. Maarten, St. Thomas, Salt Lake City, San Antonio, San Diego, San Francisco, San José (CR), San Juan, Sarasota, Savannah, Seattle/Tacoma, Syracuse, Tampa, Toronto–Pearson, Tulsa, Washington–Dulles, Washington–National, West Palm Beach, Wilmington (NC); Seasonal: Antigua, Athens, Bangor, Barcelona (begins May 27, 2027), Belize City, Birmingham (AL), Bozeman, Burlington (VT), Calgary, Cozumel, Daytona Beach, Dublin, Eagle/Vail, Fayetteville/Bentonville, George Town, Grenada, Jackson Hole, Knoxville, Palm Springs, Panama City (FL), Paris–Charles de Gaulle, Puerto Plata, Rapid City, Rome–Fiumicino, St. Croix, St. Kitts, St. Vincent–Argyle, San José del Cabo, Vancouver, Wilkes-Barre/Scranton
American Eagle	Akron/Canton, Allentown, Appleton, Asheville, Atlanta, Augusta (GA), Baton Rouge, Birmingham (AL), Burlington (VT), Charleston (SC), Charleston (WV), Charlottesville (VA), Chattanooga, Cincinnati, Columbia (MO), Columbia (SC), Columbus–Glenn, Dayton, Daytona Beach, Destin/Fort Walton Beach, Erie, Evansville, Fayetteville/Bentonville, Fayetteville (NC), Florence (SC), Fort Wayne, Gainesville, George Town, Greensboro, Greenville, Greenville/Spartanburg, Gulfport/Biloxi, Harrisburg, Hilton Head, Huntington, Huntsville, Jackson (MS), Jacksonville (NC), Key West, Knoxville, Lafayette, Lewisburg (WV), Lexington, Little Rock, Louisville, Lynchburg, Madison, Manchester (NH), Melbourne/Orlando, Memphis, Mobile–Regional, Moline/Quad Cities, Montgomery, Montréal–Trudeau, Myrtle Beach, Naples (FL) (begins December 2, 2026), Nashville, New Bern, Newport News, Norfolk, North Eleuthera, Oklahoma City, Panama City (FL), Pensacola, Peoria, Providence, Richmond, Roanoke, Rochester (NY), Salisbury, Savannah, Shenandoah Valley, Shreveport, South Bend, Springfield/Branson, State College, Tallahassee, Toronto–Pearson, Tri-Cities (TN), Tulsa, Vero Beach, Washington–Dulles, Washington–National, White Plains, Wilkes-Barre/Scranton, Wilmington (NC); Seasonal: Aspen, Cedar Rapids/Iowa City, Freeport, Governor's Harbour, Marsh Harbour, Martha’s Vineyard, Milwaukee, Nantucket, Portland (ME), Québec City, Sarasota, Traverse City
Contour Airlines	Altoona, Beckley, Muscle Shoals, Parkersburg, Williamsport (PA)
Delta Air Lines	Atlanta, Detroit, Minneapolis/St. Paul, Salt Lake City
Delta Connection	Boston, New York–JFK, New York–LaGuardia
Etihad Airways	Abu Dhabi
Frontier Airlines	Baltimore, Dallas/Fort Worth, Denver, Fort Lauderdale, Houston–Intercontinental, Miami, New York–LaGuardia, Orlando, Philadelphia, San Juan
JetBlue	Fort Lauderdale
Lufthansa	Munich
Southwest Airlines	Baltimore, Chicago–Midway, Dallas–Love, Nashville; Seasonal: Denver, St. Louis
Sun Country Airlines	Seasonal: Minneapolis/St. Paul
United Airlines	Chicago–O'Hare, Denver, Houston–Intercontinental, Newark
United Express	Chicago–O'Hare, Houston–Intercontinental, Newark, Washington–Dulles
Volaris	Guadalajara

== Statistics ==
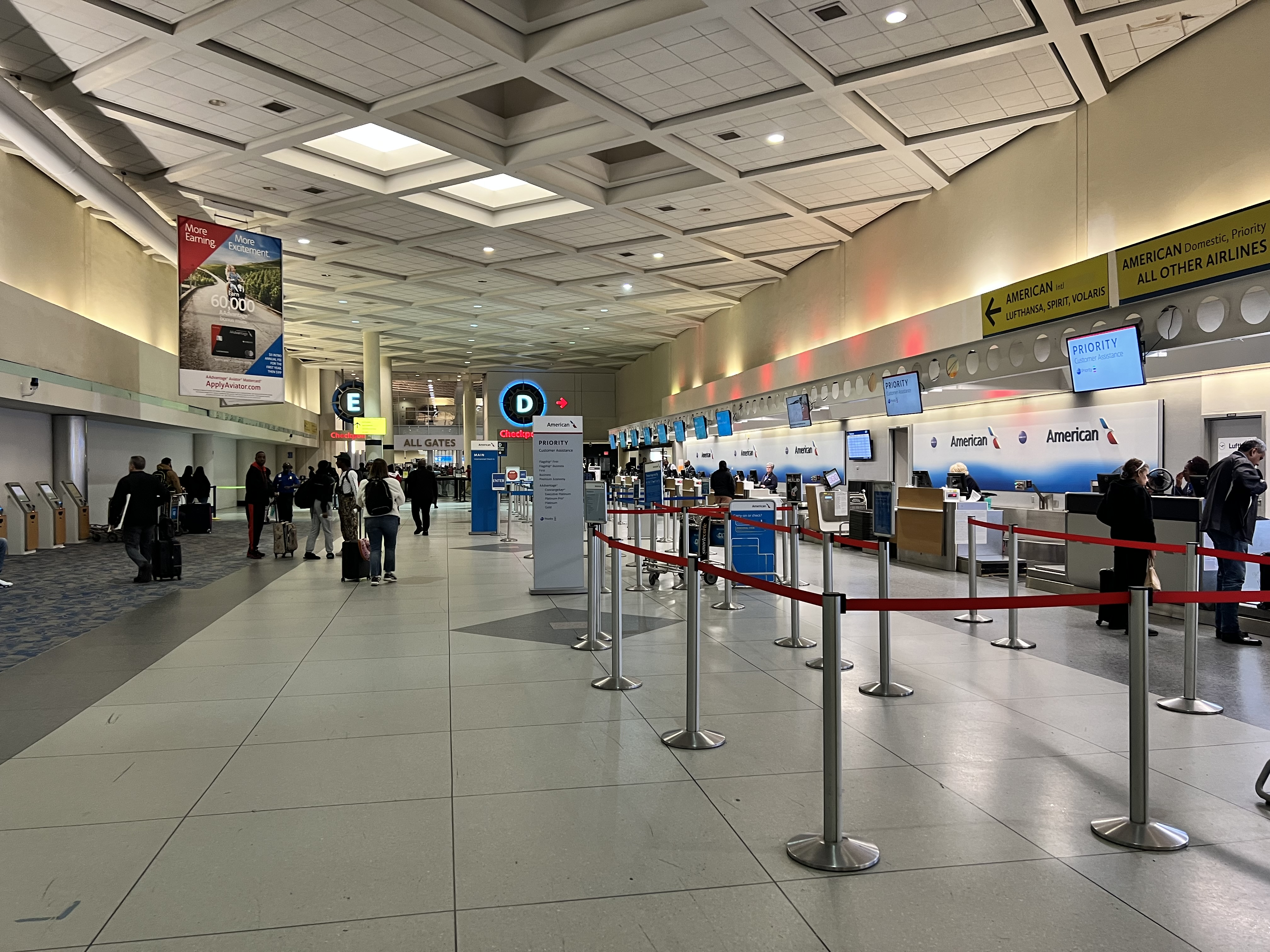
Old American Airlines check-in counters. (Have since been remodeled)

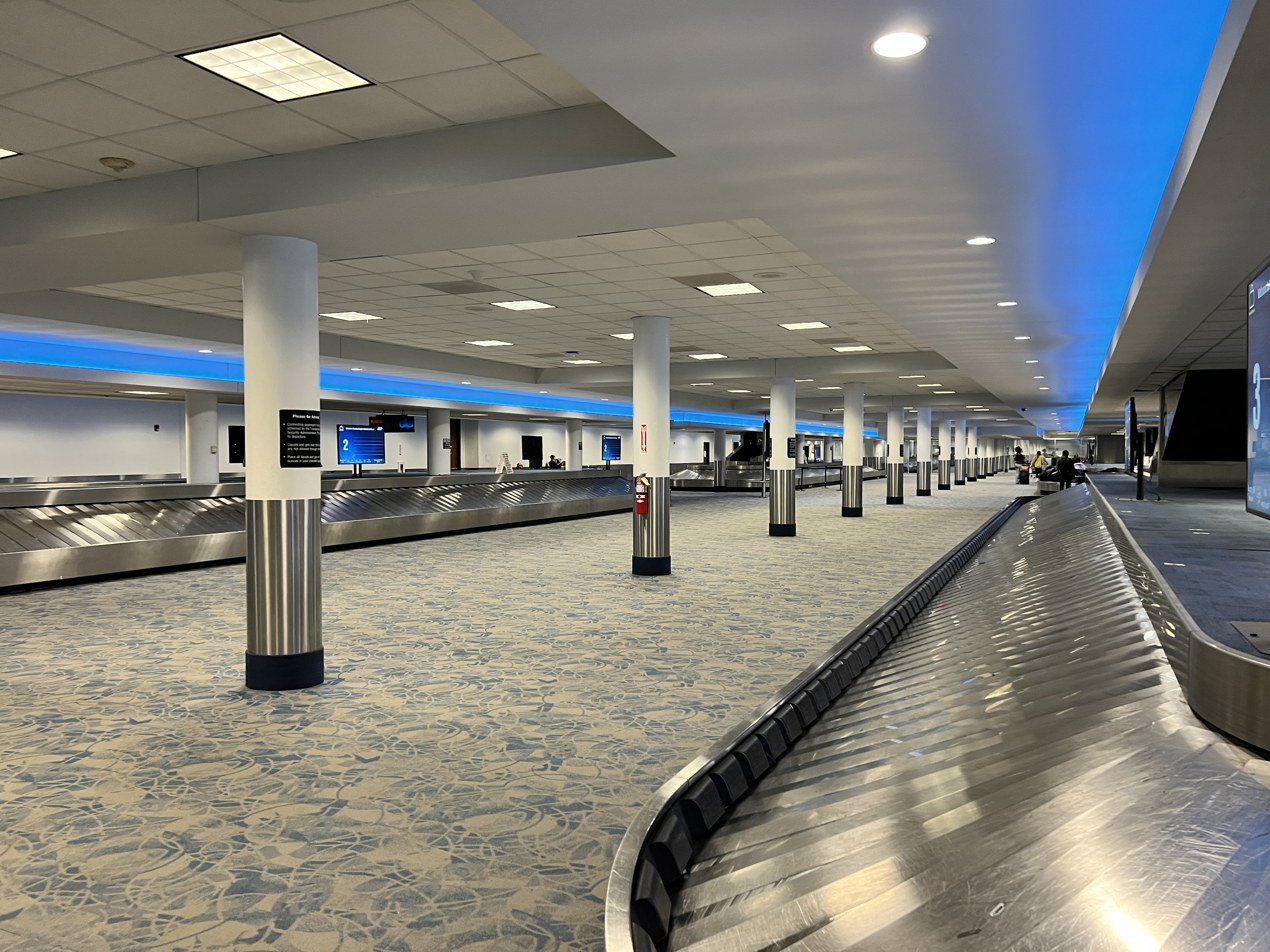
International baggage claim band.

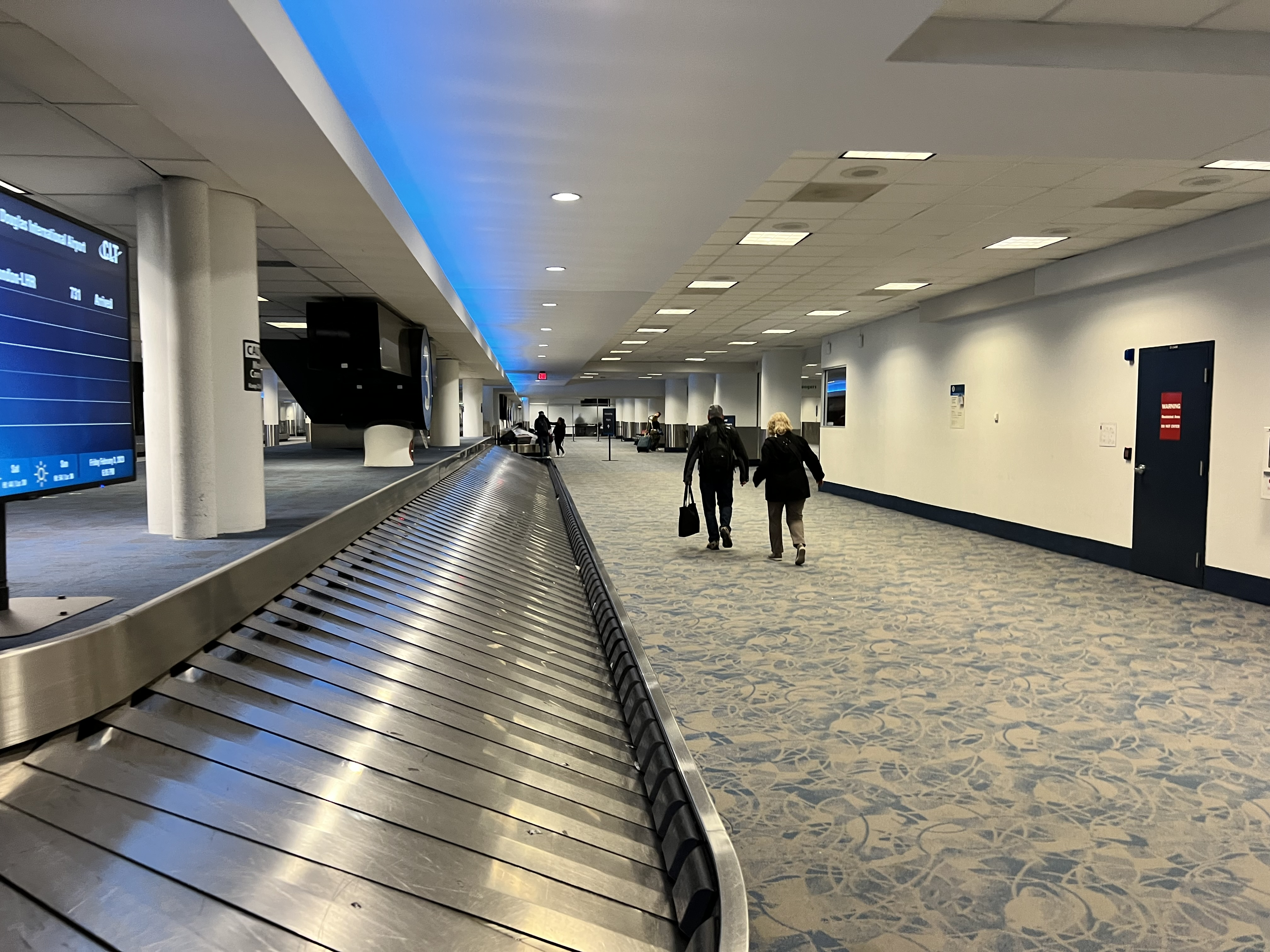
International baggage claim band.

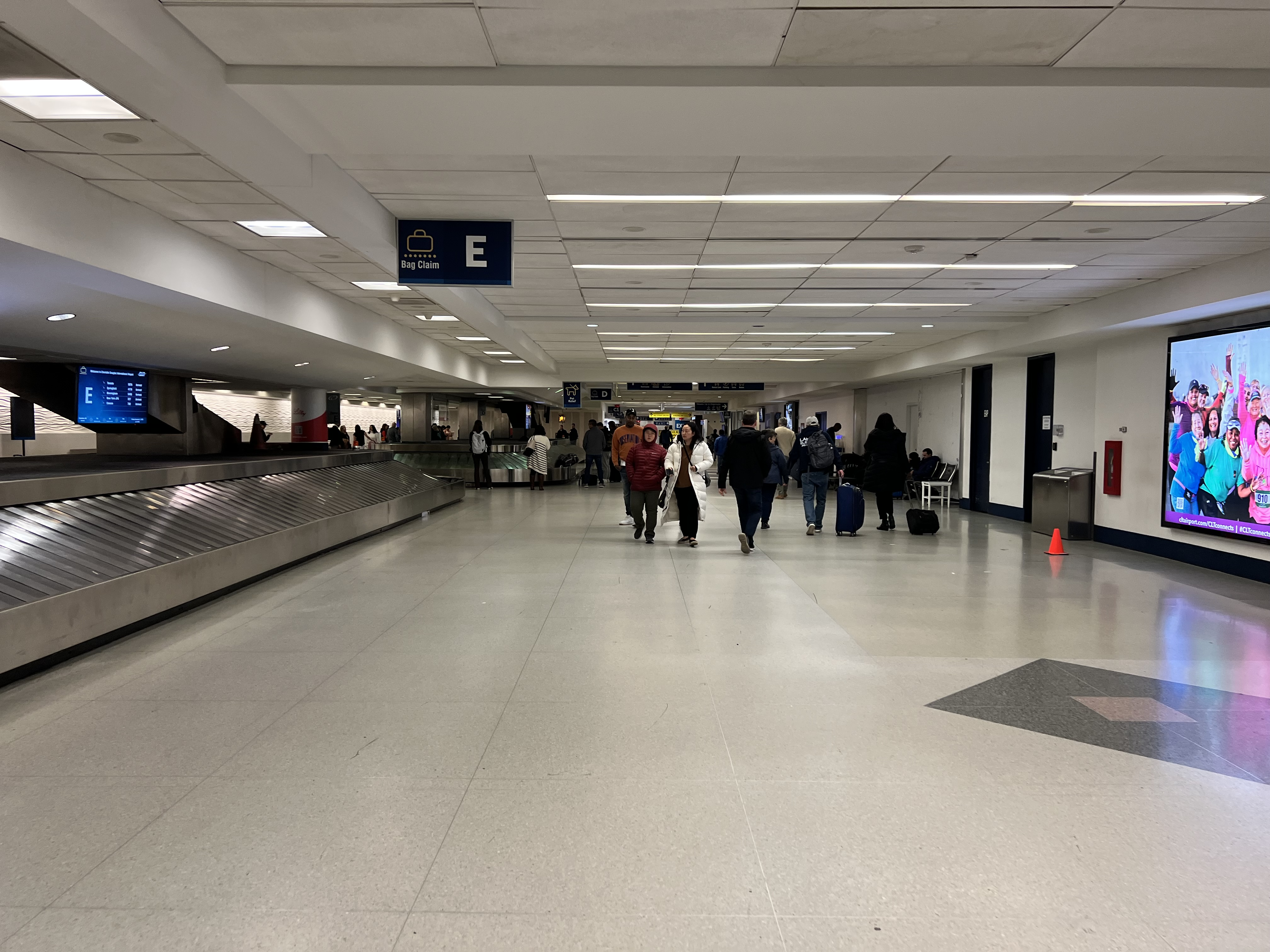
Domestic baggage claim band.

=== Top destinations ===
Busiest domestic routes from CLT (September 2025 – August 2026)
Rank	City	Passengers	Carriers
1	Orlando, Florida	717,260	American, Frontier, Spirit
2	Dallas/Fort Worth, Texas	606,840	American, Frontier
3	Miami, Florida	544,350	American, Frontier, Spirit
4	Chicago–O'Hare, Illinois	536,640	American, Frontier, United
5	New York–LaGuardia, New York	526,000	American, Delta, Frontier, Spirit
6	Phoenix–Sky Harbor, Arizona	478,640	American
7	Boston, Massachusetts	471,420	American, Delta, Spirit
8	Tampa, Florida	457,310	American, Frontier, Spirit
9	Philadelphia, Pennsylvania	448,020	American, Frontier, Spirit
10	Fort Lauderdale, Florida	444,570	American, Frontier, Spirit

Busiest international routes from CLT (September 2025 – August 2026)
Rank	Airport	Passengers	Carriers
1	London–Heathrow, United Kingdom	253,696	American
2	Cancún, Mexico	219,231	American
3	Punta Cana, Dominican Republic	198,227	American
4	Munich, Germany	146,209	American, Lufthansa
5	Toronto–Pearson, Canada	132,264	Air Canada, American
6	Montego Bay, Jamaica	123,898	American
7	Nassau, Bahamas	110,015	American
8	Oranjestad, Aruba	95,742	American
9	Providenciales, Turks and Caicos	84,995	American
10	Madrid, Spain	84,562	American

=== Airline market share ===
Largest airlines serving CLT (September 2025 – August 2026)
Rank	Airline	Passengers	Share
1	American Airlines	30,216,000	68.17%
2	Delta Air Lines	977,000	2.20%
3	Frontier Airlines	963,000	2.17%
4	Southwest Airlines	835,000	1.88%
5	Envoy Air	702,000	1.58%
	Other	10,633,000	23.99%

=== Annual traffic ===
Annual passenger traffic at CLT 2000–present
Year	Passengers	Year	Passengers	Year	Passengers
2000	21,692,479	2010	37,951,414	2020	26,228,879
2001	21,294,054	2011	38,748,714	2021	41,889,099
2002	21,978,865	2012	40,740,461	2022	46,349,253
2003	23,345,327	2013	43,477,938	2023	51,972,786
2004	25,531,937	2014	43,985,941	2024	57,272,639
2005	28,720,367	2015	44,551,396	2025	51,886,744
2006	30,072,881	2016	43,643,641	2026	
2007	33,615,542	2017	44,578,239	2027	
2008	35,016,664	2018	44,717,683	2028	
2009	34,944,513	2019	48,512,104	2029	

== Accidents and incidents ==
- On May 24, 1950, a Grumman Mallard operated by Ford Motor Company crashed during takeoff. One occupant was killed.
- On September 11, 1974, Eastern Air Lines Flight 212 crashed on final approach en route from Charleston, South Carolina. The NTSB determined that the probable cause of the accident was a "lack of altitude awareness" of the pilots at critical points during the approach. Of 82 people on board, only 13 survived the crash and fire; three of those died within a month of the accident.
- On October 25, 1986, Piedmont Airlines Flight 467 overran the runway, damaging the airplane beyond repair. Of the 119 people on board, three passengers sustained serious injuries, and three crew members and 28 passengers sustained minor injuries in the incident. There were no fatalities. An NTSB report was released, which concluded that "crew coordination was deficient due to the first officer's failure to call the captain's attention to aspects of the approach that were not in accordance with Piedmont operating procedures."
- On January 19, 1988, a Mountain Air Cargo De Havilland Canada DHC-6 Twin Otter 200 (N996SA), on a flight from Erie, Pennsylvania, collided with a tree when attempting to approach the 36L runway. One crew member was seriously injured.
- On July 2, 1994, USAir Flight 1016, which originated in Columbia, South Carolina, crashed in a residential area on approach, killing 37. The crash of the DC-9 was attributed to windshear during a thunderstorm.
- On December 10, 1997, a Beechcraft King Air, operated by Spitfire Sales and Leasing, crashed on approach to runway 36L colliding with trees and the ground. One crewmember was killed.
- On March 31, 2002, Delta Air Lines Flight 12, diverted to Charlotte after the crew of the McDonnell Douglas MD-11 reported a fire warning in the number 2 (center) engine and initiated an emergency evacuation. The warning was late determined by the NTSB to be false.
- On January 8, 2003, US Airways Express Flight 5481 crashed on takeoff while en route to Greenville-Spartanburg International Airport, killing all 21 people aboard. The flight was operated by Air Midwest, an independent airline operating under a US Airways Express codesharing agreement. The cause of the accident was due to the center of gravity (CG) calculations used a reference from 1936 and didn't take into account that people in general had become bigger over time. This resulted in the 23 checked bags – two of which were exceptionally heavy – moving the CG 5% further aft than allowed. Additionally, maintenance to the elevator cables three days before, during routine check by a third party contractor, were done incorrectly by a mechanic in training who had not worked on this type of aircraft before, and was talked through it by the instructing maintenance supervisor – who was also the quality assurance inspector. He left out several critical steps when talking the mechanic trainee through the process. This limited the pitch down on the aircraft and prevented the cockpit crew from correcting the CG problem. Since the plane had already had eight previous cycles after the scheduled maintenance, it was determined that just the CG miscalculation OR the improper setting of the elevator cable would not have caused the crash. Only the two issues together caused the crash.
- On February 15, 2017, a CRJ-700, operated by American Eagle, struck a deer while taking off. The aircraft declared an emergency and returned to Charlotte due to a fuel leak. None of the 44 passengers or crew were injured.
- On June 28, 2023, a Delta Air Lines Boeing 717 from Atlanta landed at CLT without its nose gear deployed on runway 36L. None of the 101 passengers and crew on board were injured.
