= Fayetteville Regional Airport =

Airport in Fayetteville, North Carolina, US

Fayetteville Regional Airport Grannis Field
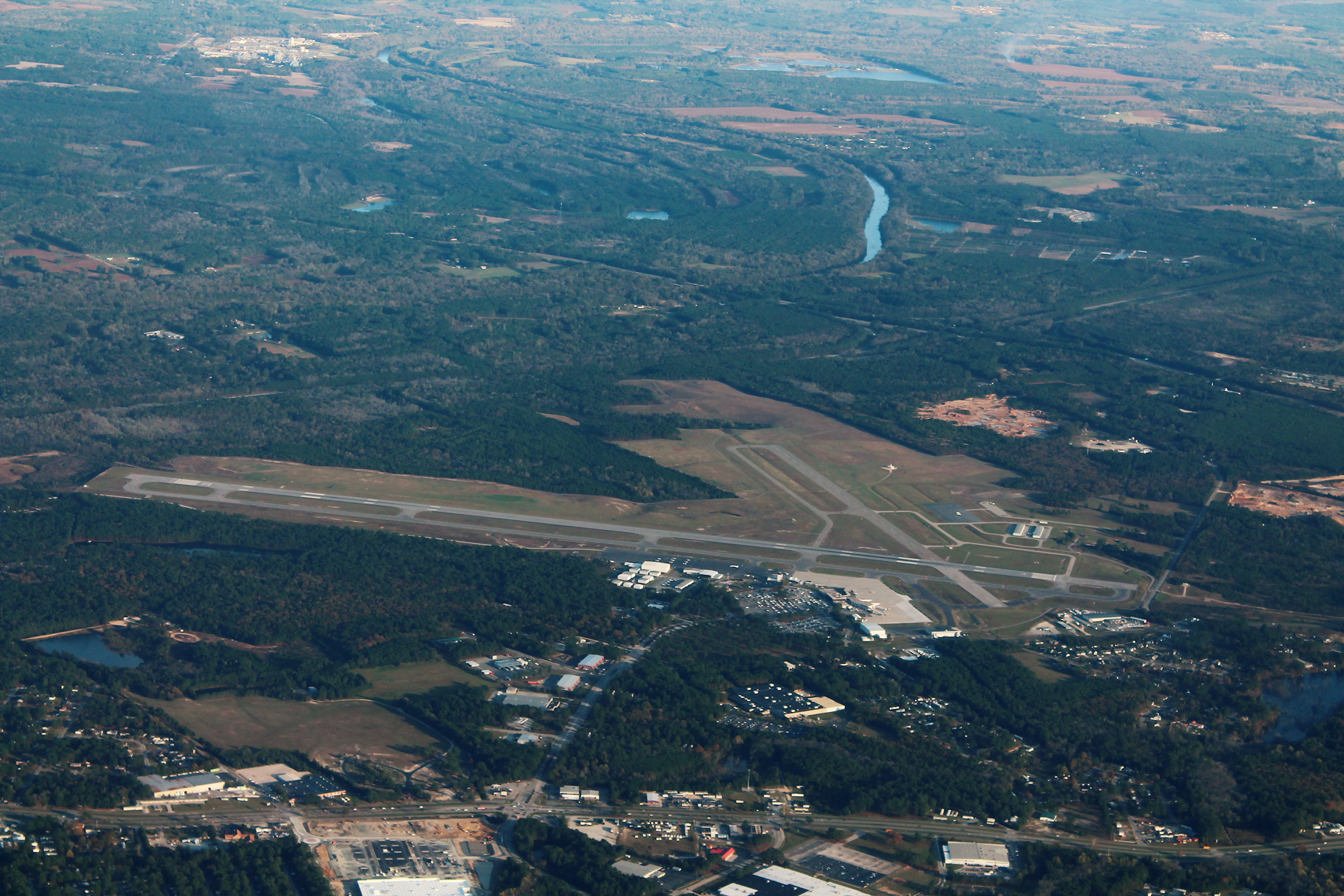
- Aerial view of the airport

- IATA: FAY; ICAO: KFAY; FAA LID: FAY

Summary
- Airport type: Public
- Owner: City of Fayetteville
- Operator: Fayetteville Airport Commission
- Serves: Fayetteville metropolitan area and southeastern North Carolina
- Location: Fayetteville, North Carolina
- Elevation AMSL: 189 ft (58 m)
- Coordinates: 34°59′28″N 078°52′49″W
- Website: www.flyfay.com

Map
- Location of airport in North Carolina FAY (the United States)

Runways
Direction	Length		Surface
Direction	ft	m	Surface
4/22	7,709	2,350	Asphalt
10/28	4,801	1,463	Asphalt

Statistics (2022)
- Aircraft operations: 33,327
- Based aircraft: 74
- Sources: FAA, Airport FAA airport diagram

Fayetteville Regional Airport (IATA: FAY, ICAO: KFAY, FAA LID: FAY), also known as Grannis Field, is a public use airport in Cumberland County, North Carolina, United States. It is owned by the city of Fayetteville and located three nautical miles (6 km) south of its central business district.

The airport has two runways and is served by a two-concourse terminal for commercial aviation and one separate terminal for general aviation traffic. The commercial terminal building was designed by Fayetteville architect Mason S. Hicks, a Fellow of the American Institute of Architects.

As per Federal Aviation Administration records, the airport had 202,597 passenger boardings (enplanements) in calendar year 2008, 231,002 enplanements in 2009, and 258,986 in 2010. It is included in the National Plan of Integrated Airport Systems for 2011–2015, which categorized it as a primary commercial service airport (more than 10,000 enplanements per year).

== Facilities and aircraft ==
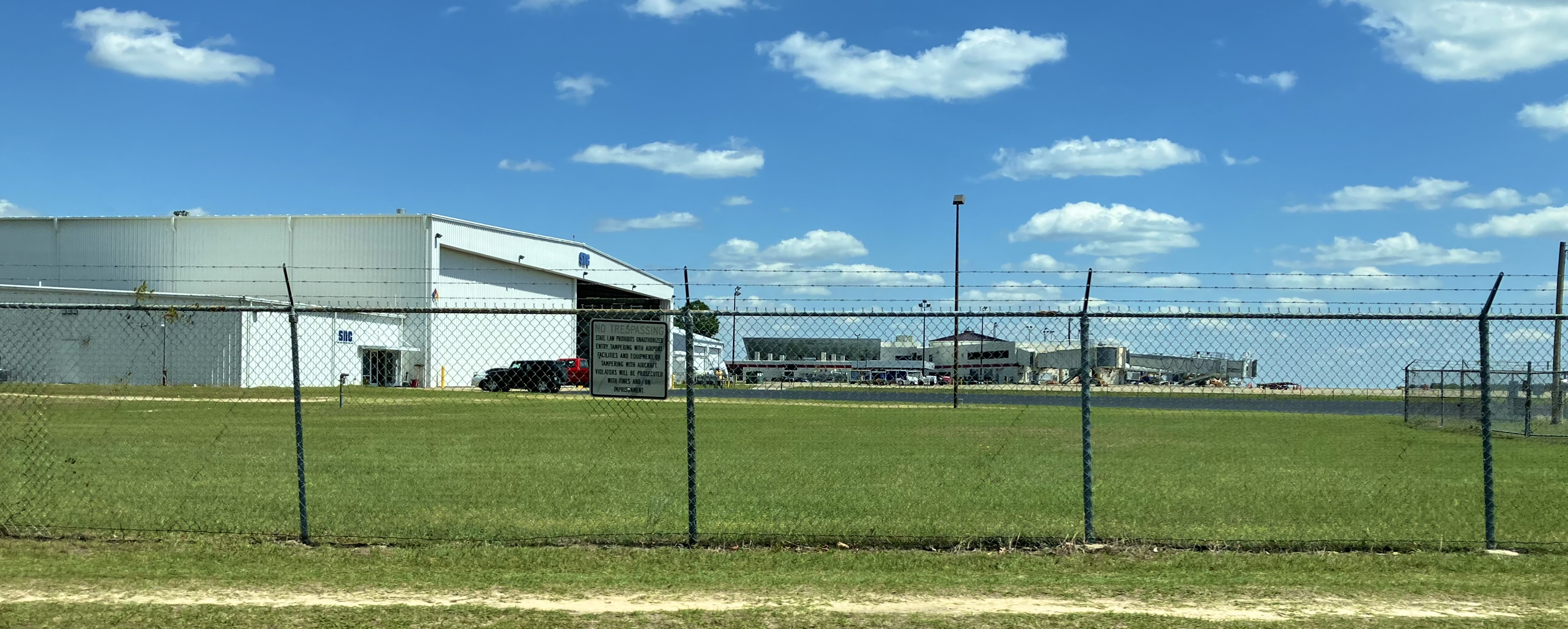
Hangars and jet bridges

Fayetteville Regional Airport covers an area of 1,343 acres (543 ha) at an elevation of 189 feet (58 m) above mean sea level. It has two runways with asphalt surfaces: 4/22 is 7,709 by 150 feet (2,350 x 46 m) and 10/28 is 4,801 by 150 feet (1,463 x 46 m).

The terminal features two concourses. There are 2 gates on Concourse A that serve commercial turboprop and charter aircraft, and there are four gates on Concourse B equipped with jetbridges that serve regional jets and full size aircraft. Airline ticket counters and baggage claim are located on the ground level. Security and access to gates is on the second level, accessible by escalator, stairs, and elevator. The USO is located just inside security and is accessible to concourses A and B.

For the 12-month period ending December 31, 2022, the airport had 33,327 aircraft operations, an average of 91 per day: 44% general aviation, 10% air taxi, 37% scheduled commercial, and 10% military. At that time there were 74 aircraft based at this airport: 56 single-engine, 11 multi-engine, 6 jet, and 1 helicopter.

== Airlines and destinations ==
=== Passenger Destinations ===
Airlines	Destinations
American Eagle	Charlotte
Delta Connection	Atlanta

=== Top destinations ===
Busiest domestic routes from Fayetteville (NC) (September 2025 - August 2026)
Rank	City	Passengers
1	Charlotte, North Carolina	80,280
2	Atlanta, Georgia	76,740

=== Airline market share ===
Largest airlines at FAY (September 2025 - August 2026)
Rank	Airline	Passengers	Share
1	Piedmont Airlines	143,000	45.75%
2	Endeavor Air	142,000	45.56%
3	SkyWest Airlines	9,410	3.01%
4	PSA Airlines	9,040	2.89%
5	Envoy Air	8,670	2.78%
	Other	0	0.00%

== Previous service ==
Fayetteville Regional Airport was served in the past by Piedmont Airlines, which merged with Allegheny Airlines and Pacific Southwest Airlines to form US Airways and US Airways Express; Atlantic Southeast Airlines, now a part of Delta Connection; and American Eagle, a subsidiary of AMR Corporation and commuter carrier for American Airlines.

American Eagle provided nonstop service to Raleigh–Durham International Airport and Dallas/Fort Worth International Airport.

US Airways Express provided nonstop service to Charlotte Douglas International Airport, Washington–National and offered seasonal service to Philadelphia International Airport.

Fayetteville Regional Airport was also briefly served by Allegiant Air with nonstop service to Orlando Sanford International Airport.

On March 7, 2019, United Airlines announced that they would stop serving Fayetteville Regional Airport under the United Express brand due to the route being "no longer sustainable". The route was operated by Air Wisconsin using CRJ-200 aircraft to Washington Dulles International Airport.

Previous service and destinations
The following airlines offered scheduled passenger service:

Airlines	Destinations
Piedmont Airlines	Charlotte
US Airways Express	Charlotte
American Eagle	Raleigh/Durham
American Eagle	Dallas/Fort Worth
Allegiant Air	Orlando/Sanford
United Express	Washington–Dulles

== Future expansion ==
During 2014, the Fayetteville Airport Commission, airport management, and the Fayetteville City Council began exploring options for expansion of the terminal at the airport. This expansion will involve the removal of the original Concourse A, which is an older-style ground level concourse that was part of the original design. It will be replaced with an elevated concourse that matches the current Concourse B. This will create a new total of 8 gates, all of which will be fitted with jet-bridges, and two of which will be fitted with adjustable-height jet bridges capable of accommodating larger jet aircraft, as well as expanded seating areas and new restrooms and dining facilities. The expansion will also provide expanded facilities for the Transportation Security Administration to allow for multiple security lanes, replacing the current single security line format. Additional airline counter space would be created by relocating TSA baggage operations from the main ticketing lobby to the rear service area. These terminal renovations and expansions will make it possible for Fayetteville to be served by additional air carriers in the future, with a goal of adding hub connections and destinations to make travel easier for passengers from the Fayetteville metro area.

== See also ==
- List of airports in North Carolina
