= List of airports in the Bahamas =

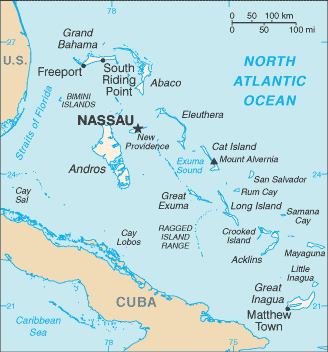
Map of the Bahamas

This is a list of airports in the Bahamas, grouped by island and sorted by location.

The Bahamas, officially the Commonwealth of The Bahamas, is an English-speaking country consisting of 29 islands, 661 cays, and 2,387 islets. It is located at the north-east of the Caribbean Sea in the Atlantic Ocean north of Cuba, Hispaniola (Dominican Republic and Haiti) and the Caribbean Sea, northwest of the Turks and Caicos Islands, and southeast of the United States of America (nearest to the state of Florida). Its total land area is almost 14,000 square kilometres (5,400 sq mi), with an estimated population of 330,000. Its capital is Nassau.

== Airports ==
Airport names shown in bold indicate the airport has scheduled service on commercial airlines.

Location served	ICAO	IATA	Airport name	Runway (ft)	Coordinates
**ABACO**
Castaway Cay	MYAG		Castaway Cay Airport (private)	14/32: 3,100 x 80, ASPHALT	26°05′26.0″N 077°32′23.9″W
Marsh Harbour	MYAM	MHH	**Marsh Harbour Airport**	6,100 x 100	26°30′41.1″N 077°05′00.7″W
Moore's Island	MYAO		**Mores Island Airport**	2,640 x 100	26°19′04.5″N 077°33′44.3″W
Sandy Point	MYAS		Sandy Point Airport	4,500 x 100	26°00′17.0″N 077°23′43.9″W
Scotland Cay	MYXI		Scotland Cay Airport (private)	13/31: 3,000 x 100, GRAVEL	26°38′31.0″N 077°04′02.9″W
Spanish Cay	MYAX		Spanish Cay Airport	14/32: 4,402 x 70, GRAVEL	26°57′01.2″N 077°32′37.7″W
Treasure Cay	MYAT	TCB	Treasure Cay Airport	6,900 x 150	26°44′43.2″N 077°23′27.6″W
Walker's Cay	MYAW	WKR	**Walker's Cay Airport**	09/27: 2,500 x 80, GRAVEL	27°15′37.5″N 078°24′08.0″W
**ACKLINS**
Spring Point	MYAP	AXP	**Spring Point Airport**	5,000 x 150	22°26′30.8″N 073°58′14.9″W
**ANDROS**
Andros Town, North Andros	MYAF	ASD	**Andros Town Airport** (Fresh Creek Airport)	4,000 x 100	24°41′52.7″N 077°47′44.4″W
Andros Town, North Andros	MYCZ		Autec Heliport	H1: 100 x 100, ASPHALT; H2: 100 x 100, ASPHALT; H3: 100 x 100, ASPHALT; H4: 100 x 100, ASPHALT	24°42′34.2″N 077°46′21.5″W
Andros Town, North Andros			Andros Central Airport (closed)	5,000 x 150	24°43′32.8″N 077°59′17.4″W
Congo Town, South Andros	MYAK	TZN	**South Andros Airport** (Congo Town Airport)	4,300 x 100	24°09′31.5″N 077°35′23.4″W
Mangrove Cay	MYAB	MAY	**Clarence A. Bain Airport**	5,000 x 75	24°17′15.6″N 077°41′03.9″W
Nicholls Town, North Andros	MYAN	SAQ	**San Andros Airport**	5,000 x 75	25°03′13.8″N 078°02′57.4″W
**BERRY ISLANDS**
Big Whale Cay	MYBW		Big Whale Cay Airport	07/25: 4,000 x 55, ASPHALT	25°24′07.2″N 077°47′18.3″W
Chub Cay	MYBC	CCZ	Chub Cay International Airport	11/29: 5,000 x 78, ASPHALT	25°25′01.8″N 077°52′50.5″W
Cistern Cay	MYBT		Cistern Field	16/34: 2,250 x 80, ASPHALT	25°46′46.8″N 077°53′08.2″W
Great Harbour Cay	MYBG	GHC	**Great Harbour Cay Airport**	4,536 x 80	25°44′18.2″N 077°50′25.0″W
Little Whale Cay	MYBX		Little Whale Cay Airport	08/26: 1,750 x 52, ASPHALT	25°26′58.5″N 077°45′34.2″W
**BIMINI**
Bimini		NSB	**North Seaplane Base**		
Bimini	MYBS	BIM	**South Bimini Airport**	5,600 x 100	25°41′59.9″N 079°15′54.8″W
North Cat Cay	MYCC	CXY	Cat Cay Airport	13/31: 1,100 x 50, ASPHALT	25°33′19.0″N 079°16′33.8″W
Ocean Cay	MYBO		Ocean Cay Airport	09/27: 1,650 x 92, GRAVEL; 17/35: 1,890 x 89, GRAVEL	25°25′22.5″N 079°12′34.1″W
**CAT ISLAND**
Arthur's Town	MYCA	ATC	Arthur's Town Airport	7,034 x 150	24°37′46.9″N 075°40′27.9″W
Cutlass Bay	MYCX		Cutlass Bay Airport	11/29: 2,400 x 60, ASPHALT	24°08′56.9″N 075°23′53.0″W
Hawks Nest	MYCH		Hawks Nest Airport	08/26: 4,600 x 80, ASPHALT	24°09′15.1″N 075°31′13.0″W
New Bight	MYCB	TBI	**New Bight Airport**	5,065 x 75	24°18′55.1″N 075°27′09.2″W
**CAY SAL**
Cay Sal	MYCS		Cay Sal Airport (private)	2,000 x 100	23°41′34.0″N 080°23′15.0″W
**CROOKED ISLAND**
Colonel Hill	MYCI	CRI	**Colonel Hill Airport** (Crooked Island Airport)	3,500 x 60	22°44′43.4″N 074°10′57.0″W
Pitts Town	MYCP	PWN	Pitts Town Airport	09/27: 1,960 x 33, ASPHALT	22°49′47.0″N 074°20′47.1″W
**ELEUTHERA**
Freetown	MYEC	~~CEL~~	Cape Eleuthera Airport (closed)	11/29: 6,460 x 144, ASPHALT	24°47′25.2″N 076°17′40.8″W
Governor's Harbour	MYEM	GHB	**Governor's Harbour Airport**	8,500 x 150	25°17′04.9″N 076°19′51.5″W
North Eleuthera	MYEH	ELH	**North Eleuthera Airport**	4,500 x 100	25°28′32.2″N 076°40′52.8″W
Rock Sound	MYER	RSD	**Rock Sound International Airport**	7,200 x 150	24°53′42.1″N 076°10′34.6″W
**EXUMA**
Black Point	MYEB		**Black Point Airport**	12/30: 2,620 x 80, ASPHALT	24°05′21.4″N 076°23′52.5″W
Darby Island			Darby Island Airport (private)	1,500 x 100	23°51′04.4″N 076°13′41.1″W
Fowl Cay	MYXA		Fowl Cay Airport	10/28: 1,040 x 45, ASPHALT	24°16′14.6″N 076°32′27.5″W
Great Exuma Island (George Town)	MYEG		George Town Airport	11/29: 5,000 x 90, ASPHALT	23°27′59.6″N 075°46′54.2″W
Great Exuma Island (Moss Town)	MYEF	GGT	**Exuma International Airport**	7,051 x 150	23°33′45.0″N 075°52′39.2″W
Leaf Cay	MYXD		Leaf Cay Airport	09/27: 1,200 x 40, GRAVEL	24°08′57.9″N 076°28′22.5″W
Lee Stocking Island	MYXE/MYEL		Lee Stocking Airport	12/30: 3,230 x 141, ASPHALT	23°46′32.1″N 076°06′13.4″W
Little Darby Island	MYXF		Little Darby Island Airport (private)	14/32: 1,000 x 75, GRASS	23°51′28.5″N 076°13′22.5″W
Little Farmer's Cay			Farmers Cay Airport	18/36: 2,480 x 56, ASPHALT	23°57′41.9″N 076°19′34.3″W
Norman's Cay	MYEN	NMC	Norman's Cay Airport	3,360 x 70	24°35′39.5″N 076°49′12.3″W
Rudder Cut Cay			Rudder Cut Cay Airport	09/27: 2,150 x 89, GRAVEL	23°53′11.1″N 076°15′10.2″W
Sampson Cay	MYXH		Sampson Cay Airport (private)	14/32: 2,000 x 39, GRAVEL	24°12′58.6″N 076°28′42.9″W
Staniel Cay	MYES	TYM	**Staniel Cay Airport**	3,030 x 75	24°10′10.8″N 076°26′21.4″W
Torch Cay	MYTC	TCV	Torch Cay Airport	12/30: 6,000 x 100, ASPHALT	23°23′50.7″N 075°29′49.5″W
**GRAND BAHAMA**
Deep Water Cay	MYGD		Deep Water Cay Airport	14/32: 4,200 x 40, GRAVEL	26°37′57.1″N 077°55′19.1″W
Freeport	MYGF	FPO	**Grand Bahama International Airport** (Freeport Int'l)	11,000 x 150	26°33′31.6″N 078°41′43.6″W
High Rock	MYGM		Grand Bahama Aux AF Airport	05/23: 7,160 x 197, ASPHALT	26°37′54.6″N 078°21′35.4″W
West End	MYGW	WTD	West End Airport	11/29: 8,000 x 150, ASPHALT	26°41′12.4″N 078°58′44.3″W
**INAGUA**
Matthew Town	MYIG	IGA	**Inagua Airport** (Matthew Town Airport)	7,000 x 100	20°58′29.9″N 073°40′00.9″W
**LONG ISLAND**
Cape Santa Maria	MYLM		Cape Santa Maria Airport	13/31: 2,600 x 60, GRAVEL	23°38′56.0″N 075°19′24.0″W
Deadman's Cay	MYLD	LGI	**Deadman's Cay Airport**	4,000 x 80	23°10′43.4″N 075°05′37.2″W
Hog Cay	MYXC		Hog Cay Airport, Long Island	07/25: 1,800 x 50, ASPHALT	23°36′04.1″N 075°20′20.8″W
Long Island	MYLR		Hard Bargain Airport	15/33: 3,000 x 60, ASPHALT	23°00′40.3″N 074°54′21.2″W
Stella Maris	MYLS	SML	**Stella Maris Airport**	3,900 x 90	23°34′58.8″N 075°16′08.4″W
**MAYAGUANA**
Mayaguana	MYMM	MYG	**Mayaguana Airport**	7,700 x 150	22°22′50.0″N 073°00′40.1″W
**NEW PROVIDENCE**
Nassau	MYNN	NAS	**Lynden Pindling International Airport**	11,000 x 150	25°02′09.8″N 077°28′08.4″W
Paradise Island	MYPI	~~PID~~	New Providence Airport (Airstrip closed 1999)	3,000	
**RAGGED ISLAND**
Duncan Town	MYRD	DCT	Duncan Town Airport	3,800 x 75	22°10′54.7″N 075°43′45.6″W
**RUM CAY**
Port Nelson	MYRP	RCY	Port Nelson Airport	2,400 x 80	23°41′00.4″N 074°50′10.5″W
**SAN SALVADOR**
Cockburn Town	MYSM	ZSA	**San Salvador Airport** (Cockburn Town Airport)	8,000 x 180	24°03′47.3″N 074°31′25.0″W

== See also ==
- List of airports by ICAO code: M#MY - Bahamas
- List of islands of the Bahamas
- List of islands of the Bahamas by total area
- Districts of the Bahamas
- Transport in the Bahamas
- Wikipedia: WikiProject Aviation/Airline destination lists: North America#Bahamas
