= Midet Aviation =

US international airline (1938–1956) that merged into Mackey

- Founded: March 4, 1938; 88 years ago incorporated in New York State
- Ceased operations: December 3, 1956; 69 years ago merged into Mackey Airlines
- Fleet size: See Fleet below
- Destinations: See Destinations below
- Headquarters: Port Washington, New York; West Palm Beach, Florida; United States
- Founder: Joseph Mundet; Nelson Miles
- Employees: 10

Midet Aviation was a small US international airline certificated to fly between south Florida and West End on Grand Bahama Island by the Civil Aeronautics Board (CAB), the now-defunct Federal agency that at the time tightly regulated almost all US commercial air transportation. Midet's fate was tied to the progress of tourist facilities on Grand Bahama Island, which prior to the 1950s were limited. An enormous resort (including the airport itself) was constructed at West End from nothing, but then abandoned, only partially complete, after one season, crimping Midet's prospects. Meanwhile, Mackey Airlines, which the CAB had also certificated to fly from South Florida to elsewhere in the Bahamas, did better. It made sense to fold subscale Midet into Mackey, which occurred in 1956.

A photo of a Midet DC-3 is available through External links and shows that the airline did business as Midet Air Lines.

== History ==
Midet Aviation Corporation was incorporated in New York State 4 March 1938, with 2/3 ownership by Joseph J. Mundet of the Mundet Cork Company, that made, among other things, bottle caps. Mundet Cork became part of Crown Cork & Seal (still a prominent beverage container manufacturer as of 2024) in 1963, an acquisition Crown would regret, because Crown inherited liability for asbestos products that Mundet Cork had also made. The balance of Midet was owned by Nelson A. Miles, who had extensive experience as a pilot, including as a barnstormer. Originally based in Port Washington, Long Island, Midet originally flew seaplanes from downtown Manhattan to Long Island, transferring the operation to West Palm Beach in the winter where it offered charters to, among other places, the Caribbean. Midet suspended operations in 1942 while Miles flew transport aircraft for the US Navy in World War II, but resumed thereafter.

=== Butlin's Grand Bahama Island project ===
Butlin's is a British holiday camp operator that played a major role in the UK holiday business prior to the advent of inexpensive flights to warm places.

In the late 1940s, Butlin's launched an ambitious project to create a resort at West End on Grand Bahama from scratch, including constructing West End Airport. Butlin's aimed to accommodate a thousand guests per night in 1950, rising to two thousand a couple years later. Almost all materials and equipment were shipped or flown in. Much of the West End site was rock. Grand Bahama Island was then almost completely undeveloped: for instance, what became Freeport was only started in 1955 on what was then pine, swamp and scrub. Butlin's contracted Midet to support construction from Florida with seaplanes 1948–1949. In April 1950, the CAB gave Midet temporary authority to fly between West Palm Beach/Miami and West End, pending its decision on certification applications by Midet and others to fly from Florida to West End and other Bahamas points. In September 1951, the CAB gave Midet a three-year certificate to fly the route for which it already had temporary authority: Miami/West Palm Beach to West End.

Unfortunately, Butlin's couldn't finish what it started; it ran the partially completed resort for one season and left for good by September 1950. Midet started scheduled service to West End on 2 April 1954. With the resort shut, Midet was limited to day trippers and a sprinkling of locals and sold it as a fishing destination. In 1955, Midet re-opened the resort itself, leasing it from the party that bought the resort in liquidation and opening one of the 10 former Butlin's accommodation blocks as the Grand Bahama Club. 1955 demand for accommodation proved promising enough that the owner took over direct operation of the resort in 1956.

=== Merger ===
Midet however, was deeply unprofitable. Nelson Miles ran it, as the CAB viewed it, as a one-man operation. The airline had a single DC-3. It had 10 employees (plus another 15 when it ran the hotel). Its 1955 operating margin was -66%. Meanwhile, Mackey Airlines was doing better. The CAB certificated Mackey to fly between Fort Lauderdale and West Palm Beach and Nassau in 1952. In 1955, Mackey had seven times Midet's revenue and was break even. When approached in May 1956 with a merger agreement between Midet and Mackey, the CAB agreed Midet made more sense as part of Mackey and approved the deal in October. Midet merged into Mackey on 3 December 1956.

== Legacy ==
Grand Bahama Island tourism through West End Airport ultimately became successful. By 1960, the hotel was redeveloped under new ownership into the Grand Bahama Hotel & Country Club, with air conditioning, TV and telephones. It would be further developed to include a marina and an 18-hole golf course. But over time, air service switched to the airport at Freeport (26 road miles from West End Airport). For instance, in January 1963, Mackey Airlines flew only to West End on Grand Bahama whereas by November 1966 most of Mackey's service to Grand Bahama was to Freeport. As of 2024, West End Airport is for use only with prior arrangement and has no aircraft service facilities whatsoever.

== Fleet ==
- 1 Douglas DC-3

== Destinations ==
As a certificated carrier:

- Miami, Florida
- West End, Grand Bahama
- West Palm Beach, Florida

== See also ==
- List of defunct airlines of the United States
