= Mackey International =

US scheduled airline (1968–1981)

IATA	ICAO	Call sign
MI^{(1)}	MI^{(1)}	MACKEY
- Founded: 11 July 1968; 57 years ago (incorporated in Florida)
- Commenced operations: 16 August 1968; 57 years ago
- Ceased operations: 19 October 1981; 44 years ago
- Fleet size: See Fleet below
- Destinations: See Destinations below
- Headquarters: Fort Lauderdale, Florida, United States
- Founder: Joseph C. Mackey

Notes
- (1) IATA, ICAO codes were the same until the 1980s

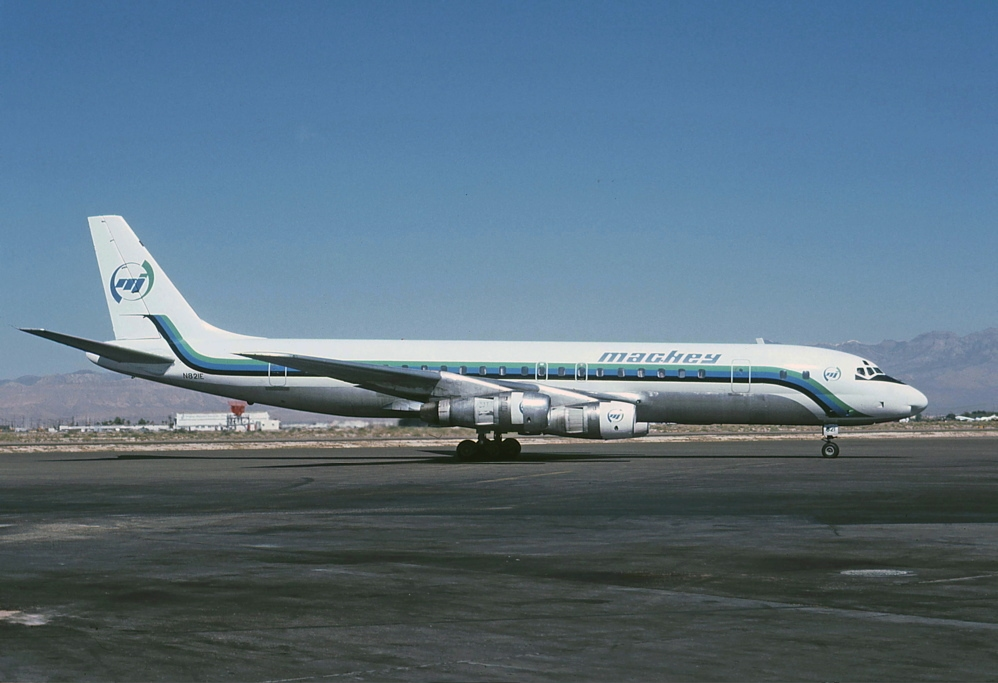
DC-8-51 at Las Vegas 1980

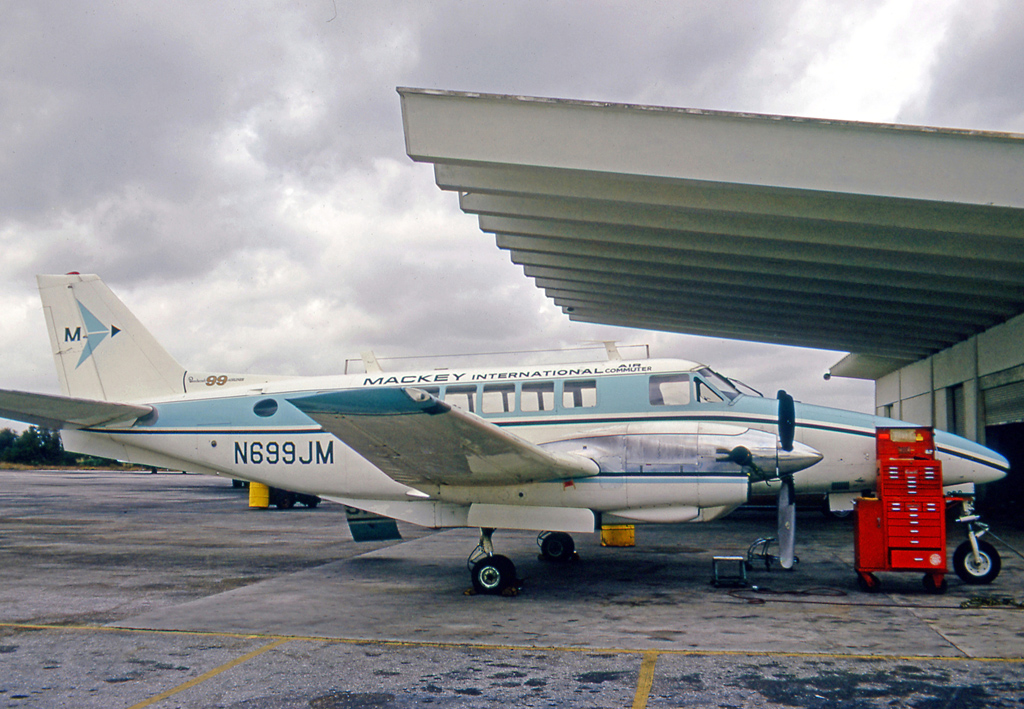
Beech 99 at Fort Lauderdale 1971. Note the "Air Commuter" titles

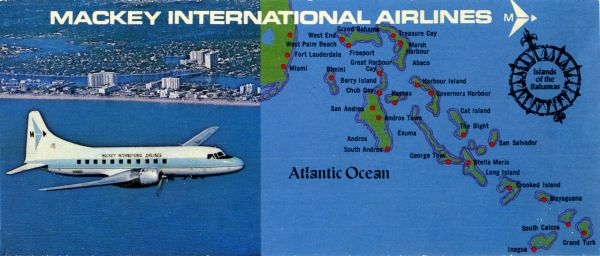
Destination Map 1972

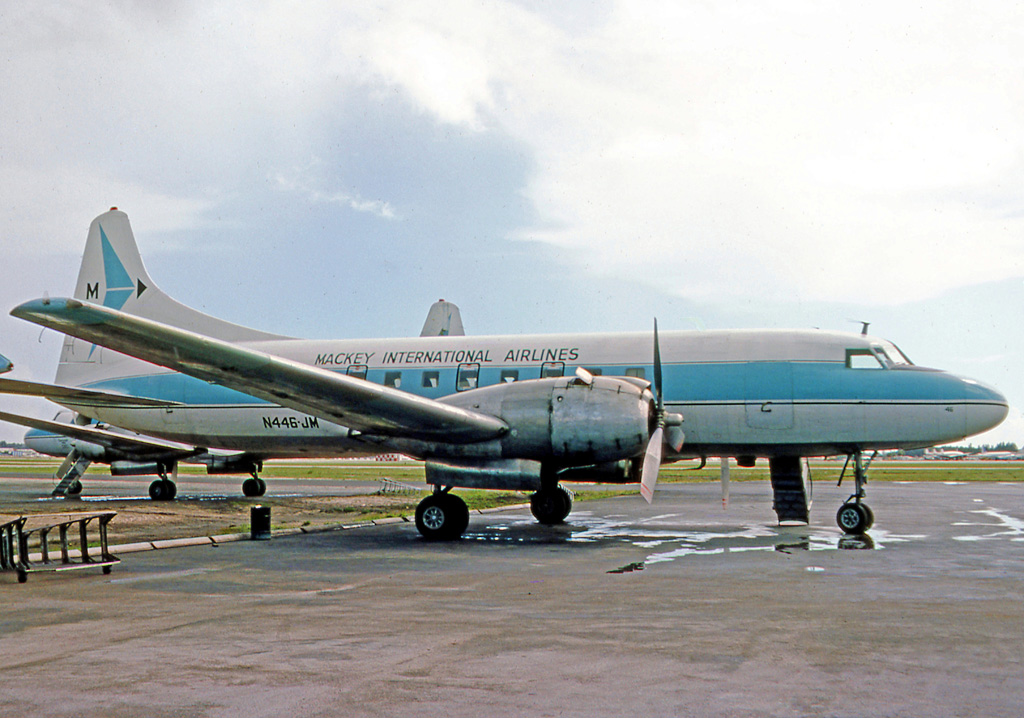
CV-440 at Fort Lauderdale 1975

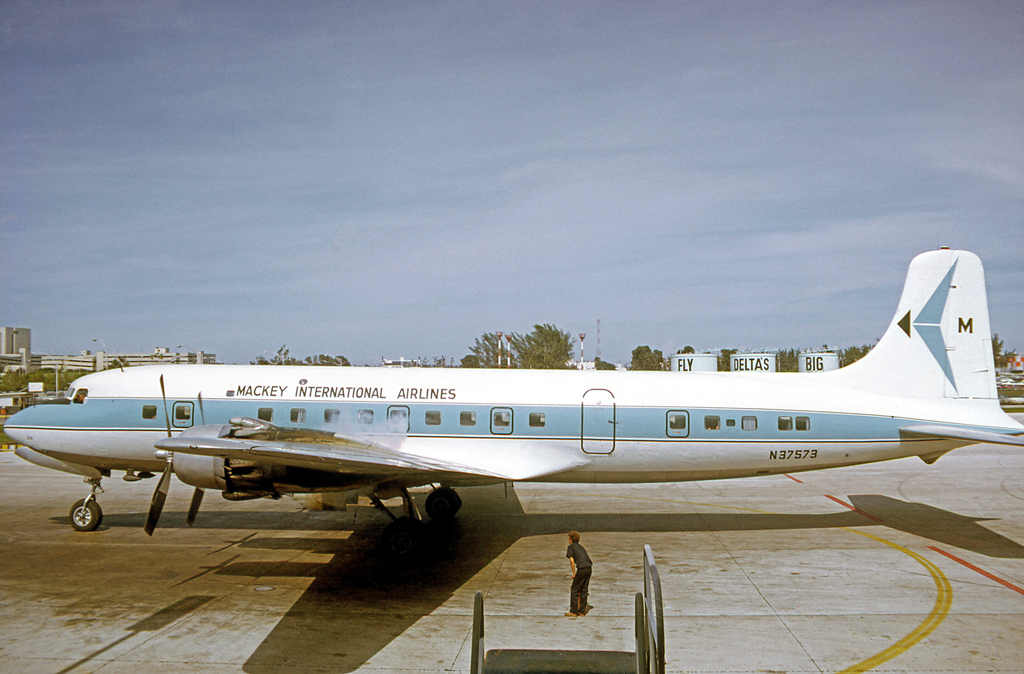
DC-6B at Miami 1975

Mackey International (MI) was a US airline, initially flying under commuter regulations until it was certificated in 1978 as an international scheduled airline by the Civil Aeronautics Board (CAB), the now-defunct Federal agency that, until 1979, tightly regulated almost all commercial US air transportation. MI's founder was aviation pioneer Joseph C. Mackey, who earlier founded Mackey Airlines, a small certificated international carrier which flew similar routes until sold to Eastern Air Lines in 1967. Through 1978, MI flew between Florida, the Bahamas, Turks and Caicos and Haiti under a number of names, including Mackey International Air Taxi, Mackey International Air Commuter and Mackey International Airlines. However, the legal name remained Mackey International. MI grew during the early 1970s but never achieved profitability. In 1977, its offices were destroyed by a terrorist bomb.

In December 1978, MI filed for bankruptcy. Control passed to a third party, which substantially mismanaged the carrier. In 1980, MI briefly flew jets from Florida to Las Vegas. The carrier stopped operations in October 1981 and stopped defending a CAB fitness investigation, which resulted in a January 1982 revocation of its certificate.

== History ==
=== Startup ===
Joseph C. Mackey was the founder of Mackey Airlines, which he sold to Eastern Air Lines in 1967, as a result of which he had a five-year noncompete, so in starting Mackey International he was limited to routes Eastern was not flying. But Eastern flew only to Nassau and Freeport and MI started with 15-seat Beech 99 turboprops and thus focused on smaller routes than Eastern. MI was incorporated in Florida on 11 July 1968 and first flight was August 16, 1968. The airline was just one division of Mackey International, which at the outset also included a realtor division and a property development division all focused on the Bahamas. Initially the airline styled itself Mackey International Air Taxi, which fit the role. The Civil Aeronautics Board carved out an exception to its otherwise tight control of commercial air transport for airlines that operated only aircraft under a specific weight, an exception described in Part 298 of the CAB's economic regulations. Such airlines were known as air taxis, Part 298 carriers, commuter airlines or similar.

=== Growth ===
A 1969 timetable shows nonstop service from Miami to nine points in Bahamas, none of them Freeport or Nassau. Fort Lauderdale was served almost exclusively as a connection over Miami, except to Sarasota and Ft Myers. In 1969, MI signed a cooperation agreement to work with Eastern, taking over a few routes that Eastern did not want to serve. Mackey International also executed an initial public offering, raising $1.6 million. In 1970, MI (with the support of Eastern) obtained a CAB exemption to fly 44 seat aircraft (i.e. go above the size limits for aircraft that Part 298 carriers could fly as of right) between Miami, Ft Lauderdale and West Palm Beach and a dozen Bahamas points, none of them Freeport or Nassau. This allowed MI to operate Convair 440s. This exemption was expanded through 1973 until it covered 49 markets. Then, in 1974, the CAB extended the 44 seat exemption to cover the Turks and Caicos, and expanded the exemption to allow MI to fly between Miami, Ft Lauderdale and West Palm Beach and certain points in the Bahamas, none of them Freeport or Nassau, with 90 seat aircraft. The CAB acknowledged that this was a very big aircraft for a Part 298 carrier to fly, and put limits on its use, including prohibiting it from flying charters. The CAB justified it in part by the fuel savings MI would realize (this was in the wake of the 1973 oil crisis. This explains why a commuter carrier was flying DC-6s between Florida and the Bahamas.

A 1970 timetable billed the airline as Mackey International Air Commuter. A 1975 timetable (for Mackey International Airlines) shows service from Miami to seven Bahamas points (other than Freeport or Nassau) and three in Turks and Caicos, many served on a multistop basis. There was substantial nonstop service from Freeport to West Palm Beach and Ft Lauderdale and some nonstops between Nassau and Fort Lauderdale. Only the three south Florida cities were served in the US.

=== Terrorist bombing ===
South Florida was beset by Cuba-related terrorist activities in the mid-1970s, with dozens of bombings, leading The Miami News to call it the explosion capital of the country. Mackey International attracted the attention of the bombers by attempting to start service to Cuba. On 25 May 1977, an early-morning bomb blast destroyed MI's Fort Lauderdale's offices, without injury as the last employees had gone home. An extremist Cuban exile group claimed responsibility, and threatened the life of a specific vice president involved in Cuba negotiations. MI stopped plans to start Cuba service, unwilling to subject employees to violence.

=== Certification, bankruptcy, end ===
In late 1976, MI added Cap Haitien, in northern Haiti. However, In March 1977, the Turks and Caicos declined to renew MI's landing rights, ostensibly for poor service, though MI disputed that. By this time, however, the CAB was processing MI's application for a certificate. The CAB finally certificated MI in July 1978 to fly from West Palm Beach, Ft Lauderdale and Miami to anywhere in the Bahamas and the Turks and Caicos plus Cap Haitien, noting the sense of deja vu relative to the earlier Mackey Airlines. The CAB noted the airline already operated like a certificated carrier in some ways, doing accounting using the CAB's system of accounts, its seat inventory hosted by Delta, etc. it operated big aircraft already. On the other hand, it was chronically loss-making (as was Mackey Airlines before) and in 1975 Joseph Mackey had ceded majority ownership to pay off an aircraft lessor, Frederick B. Ayer. Nonetheless, MI was certificated. This was the CAB under the chair of Alfred E. Kahn (who voted on the opinion), who was given the position by President Jimmy Carter specifically to encourage free competition.

MI's certification became effective 22 September 1978. But in late November, Charter Air Center dba Charter Airlines, was retained to manage MI for a five-year term, including an option to buy out Frederick B. Ayer's majority stake, in exchange for Charter Air injecting up to a half million dollars. The CAB, now in the last months of the regulated era, quickly approved the transaction, based on the dire financial condition of MI, which was interrupting service. Unmentioned was that Charter Air had been encouraged to gain control of MI by Resorts International, which at the time controlled a Bahamas casino, including offering to provide financing for Charter. The behind-the-scenes involvement of Resorts does not seem to have been reported anywhere at the time. Charter's intervention did not prevent MI from entering Chapter 11 bankruptcy on 4 December.

MI performed poorly under Charter's administration. In 1979 it ranked second among all carriers for customer complaints per 100,000 passengers flown. In 1980, it was first. MI failed to file required reports with the CAB on time or at all. Operationally, MI incurred six civil penalties from the Federal Aviation Administration for violation of Federal Aviation Regulations. It also failed pay taxes. In October 1980, Frederick B. Ayer terminated the management agreement with Charter. The dispute between Ayer and Charter led to employees going without pay. The airline then went through a series of managers, including a former administrative assistant/reservation agent. The airline turned in its Part 121 operational certificate at FAA request in January 1981, briefly acquiring a Part 135 commuter operational certificate later in the year under which it ran a Piper Navajo. In spring 1980, MI launched DC-8 service, flying to Las Vegas from Fort Lauderdale. The service was "quietly dropped" by summer and the carrier tried pivoting to charters. One such charter was in September when an MI DC-8 retrieved the body of former Nicaraguan dictator Anastasio Somoza, assassinated in exile in Paraguay, to be buried in Miami.

On 19 October 1981, MI sent a computer message to its ground handler saying it had ceased service. The CAB had started a fitness investigation over the summer. In November, MI's counsel withdrew, saying the company no longer wanted to represent itself. No one from MI appeared at a subsequent hearing. On 21 January 1982, the CAB concluded Mackey International was, in fact, unfit, and revoked its certificate. Joseph Mackey died less than a month later.

== Destinations ==
As of June 1975 (same order as the timetable):

- Fort Lauderdale, Florida
- Miami, Florida
- West Palm Beach, Florida
- Bimini, Bahamas
- Cape Eleuthera, Bahamas
- Freeport, Bahamas
- Georgetown, Bahamas
- Grand Turk, Turks and Caicos
- Great Harbour Cay, Bahamas
- Marsh Harbour, Bahamas
- Nassau, Bahamas
- North Eleuthera, Bahamas
- Providenciales, Turks and Caicos
- South Caicos, Turks and Caicos
- Treasure Cay, Bahamas

== Fleet ==
As of September 1969, Mackey International had the following fleet:

- 1 Piper Aztec
- 3 Piper Navajo
- 3 Beech 99
- 4 de Havilland Canada DHC-6 Twin Otter

As of September 1975, Mackey International had the following fleet:

- 1 Piper Navajo
- 7 Convair 440
- 2 Douglas DC-6

World Airline Fleets 1979 (copyright 1979) shows Mackey International with:

- 3 Douglas DC-6B
- 4 Convair 440
- 1 Piper Navajo

As of April 1980, the fleet was:

- 2 Convair 580 (50 seat)
- 3 DC-8 (174 seat)

Aircraft types known to have been flown by Mackey International:

(1) See External links for a photo (2) and at least one DC-6A, see External links
Type	Total	Introduced	Retired	Type	Total	Introduced	Retired
Beechcraft Model 99	3	1968	1978	DHC-6 Twin Otter^{(1)}	7	1968	1975
Convair CV-340	1	1978	1978	Douglas DC-6B^{(2)}	11	1968	1980
Convair CV-440	8	1970	1981	Douglas DC-8-51	3	1979	1981
Convair CV-580^{(1)}	2	1979	1980	Short SC.7 Skyvan^{(1)}	1	1971	1971

== See also ==
- List of defunct airlines of the United States
- Mackey Airlines
