= Mackey Airlines =

US international airline (1953–1967) that merged into Eastern

IATA	ICAO	Call sign
MK^{(1)}	MK^{(1)}	—
- Founded: September 30, 1946; 79 years ago incorporated in Florida as Mackey Air Transport
- Commenced operations: January 2, 1953; 73 years ago
- Ceased operations: January 8, 1967; 59 years ago
- Fleet size: See Fleet below
- Destinations: See Destinations below
- Headquarters: Fort Lauderdale, Florida, United States
- Founder: Joseph C. Mackey
- Employees: 230

Notes
- (1) IATA, ICAO codes were the same until the 1980s

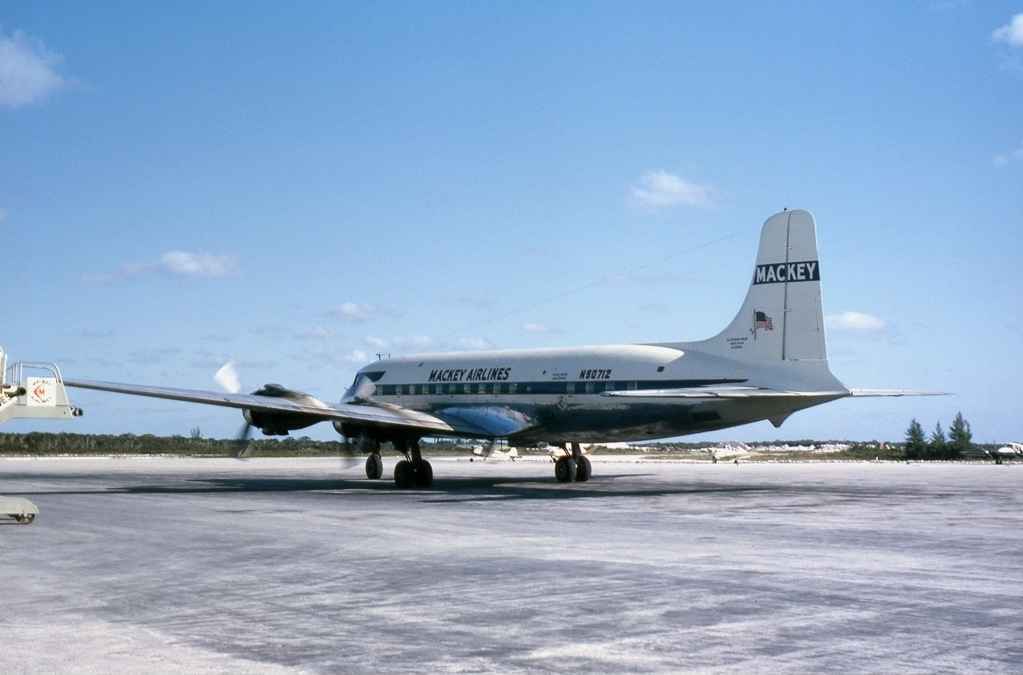
DC-6 at West End in 1965

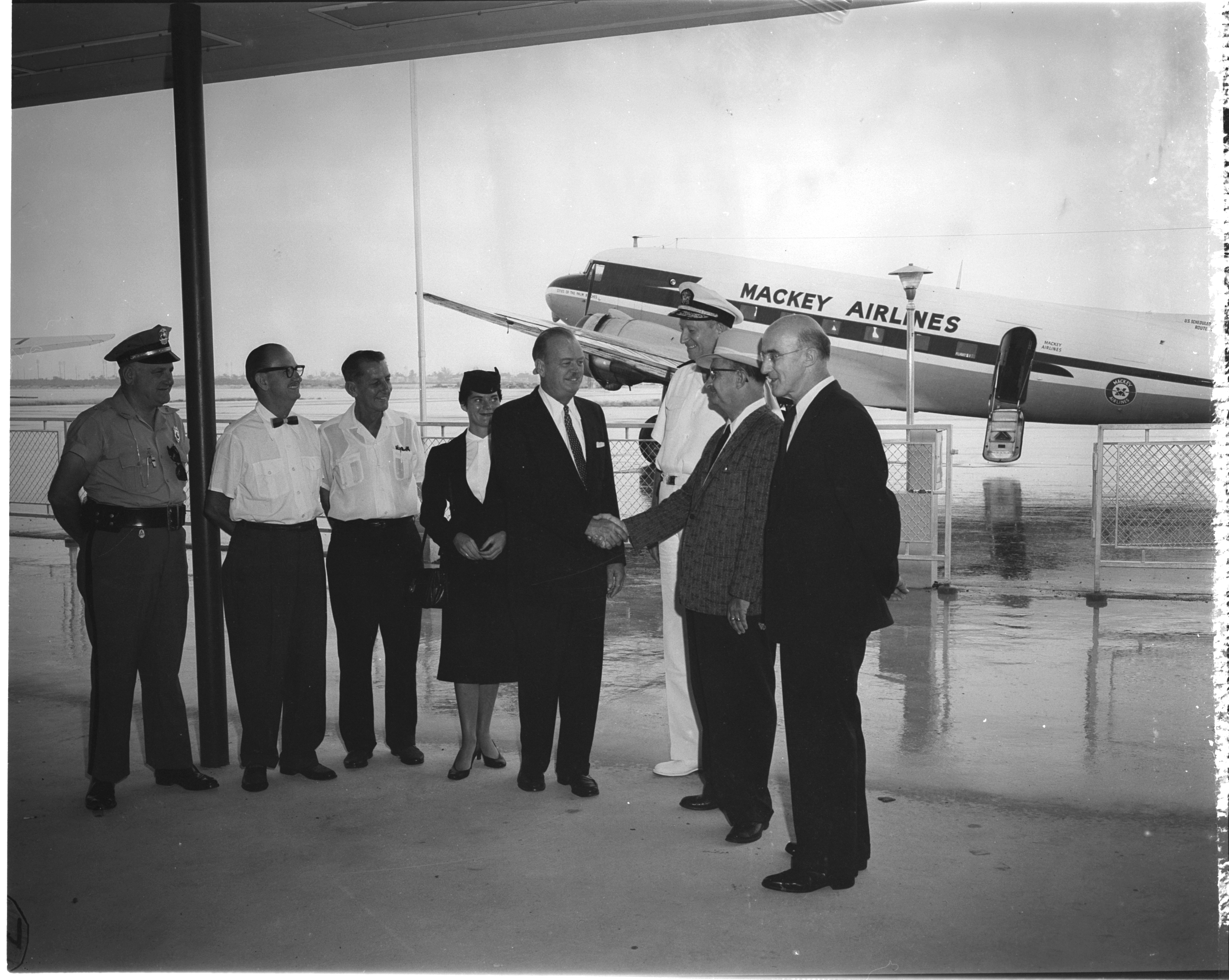
Joseph C. Mackey (center) and a DC-3 at Key West in the 1950s

Mackey Airlines (until 1953 Mackey Air Transport) was a small United States scheduled international airline flying from Florida to the Bahamas certificated in 1952 by the Civil Aeronautics Board (CAB), the now defunct Federal agency that, at the time, tightly regulated almost all US commercial air transport. The airline was founded by Joseph C. Mackey. Mackey also flew to Cuba prior to the Cuban Revolution. In 1956, Mackey absorbed Midet Aviation, an even smaller CAB-certificated airline also flying between Florida and the Bahamas. Mackey merged into Eastern Air Lines in 1967.

== Joseph C. Mackey ==
Joseph C. Mackey learned to fly as a teenager in Cleveland, flew liquor across Lake Erie during Prohibition and partnered with Roscoe Turner in air races in the 1930s. In 1940, delivering aircraft to the UK for the Royal Air Force, engine trouble forced his aircraft down in Newfoundland. Mackey, the only survivor, was left with a scarred depression in his forehead. Two others died on impact; a third, Canadian Nobel Prize winner (for co-discovery of insulin) Frederick Banting, died of injuries and exposure later. Mackey flew for the United States Army Air Force Air Transport Command during World War II and emerged a colonel. Mackey died February 1982, age 72, only a few months after his second eponymous carrier, Mackey International, ceased operations.

In 1965, the airline had 230 employees.

== History ==
Mackey Air Transport was incorporated in Florida 30 September 1946. The airline's first flight was 2 January 1953. In June, the airline changed its name to Mackey Airlines, the CAB reissued the certificate in that name in October. Flights flew primarily out of its Fort Lauderdale base and from West Palm Beach and Miami. On 3 December 1956, Mackey acquired Midet Aviation, another CAB-certificated scheduled airline flying from Florida to Bahamas. The original Mackey Airlines certificate was transferred to Eastern Air Lines on 8 January 1967.

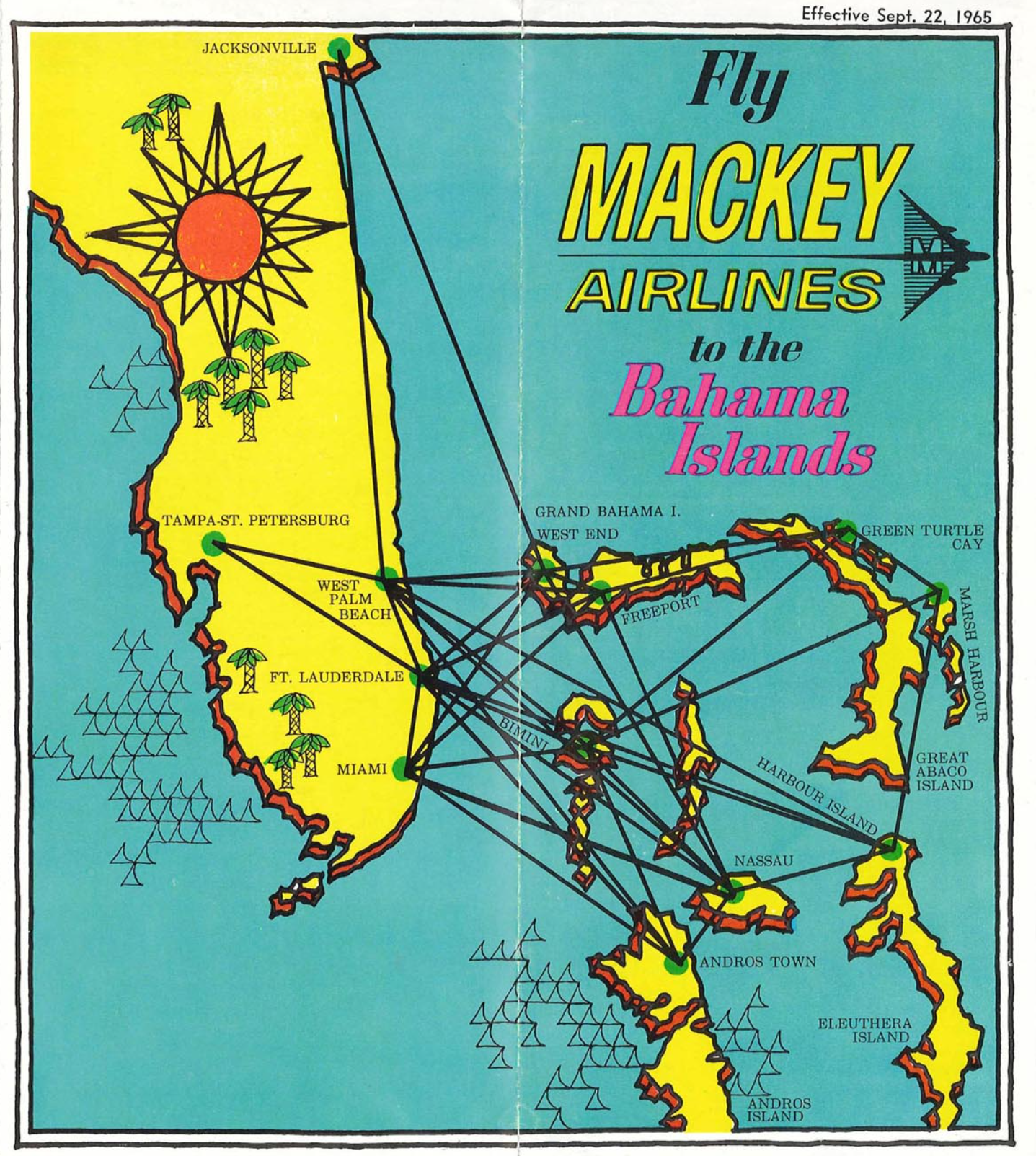
Route map from September 1965

== Destinations ==
As of November 1966 (same order as the timetable):

- Andros Town, Bahamas
- Bimini, Bahamas
- Fort Lauderdale, Florida
- Freeport, Bahamas
- Jacksonville, Florida
- Marsh Harbour, Bahamas
- Miami, Florida
- Nassau, Bahamas
- Tampa, Florida
- West End, Bahamas
- West Palm Beach, Florida

== Fleet ==
In March 1955, Aviation Week said Mackey Air Transport had four Douglas DC-3s.

As of September 1961:

- 2 Douglas DC-3
- 3 Douglas DC-4
- 1 Douglas DC-6

The following types were operated by Mackey Airlines:

Type	Total	Introduced	Retired	Type	Total	Introduced	Retired
Beechcraft 18	1	1960	1966	Douglas DC-4	3	1959	1966
Douglas DC-3	5	1953	1964	Douglas DC-6	7	1961	1967

== See also ==
- List of defunct airlines of the United States
