= Mores Island Airport =

- IATA: none; ICAO: MYAO

Summary
- Airport type: Public
- Serves: Moore's Island
- Location: Bahamas
- Elevation AMSL: 10 ft / 3 m
- Coordinates: 26°19′4.5″N 77°33′44.3″W

Map
- Location of Mores Island Airport in the Bahamas

Runways
Direction	Length		Surface
Direction	m	ft	Surface
09/27	805	2,640	Gravel
- Source: Landings.com

Mores Island Airport (ICAO: MYAO) is a public use airport located near Moore's Island, the Bahamas.

== Airlines and destinations ==
Airlines	Destinations
Flamingo Air	Freeport

== See also ==
- List of airports in the Bahamas
