= New Bight Airport =

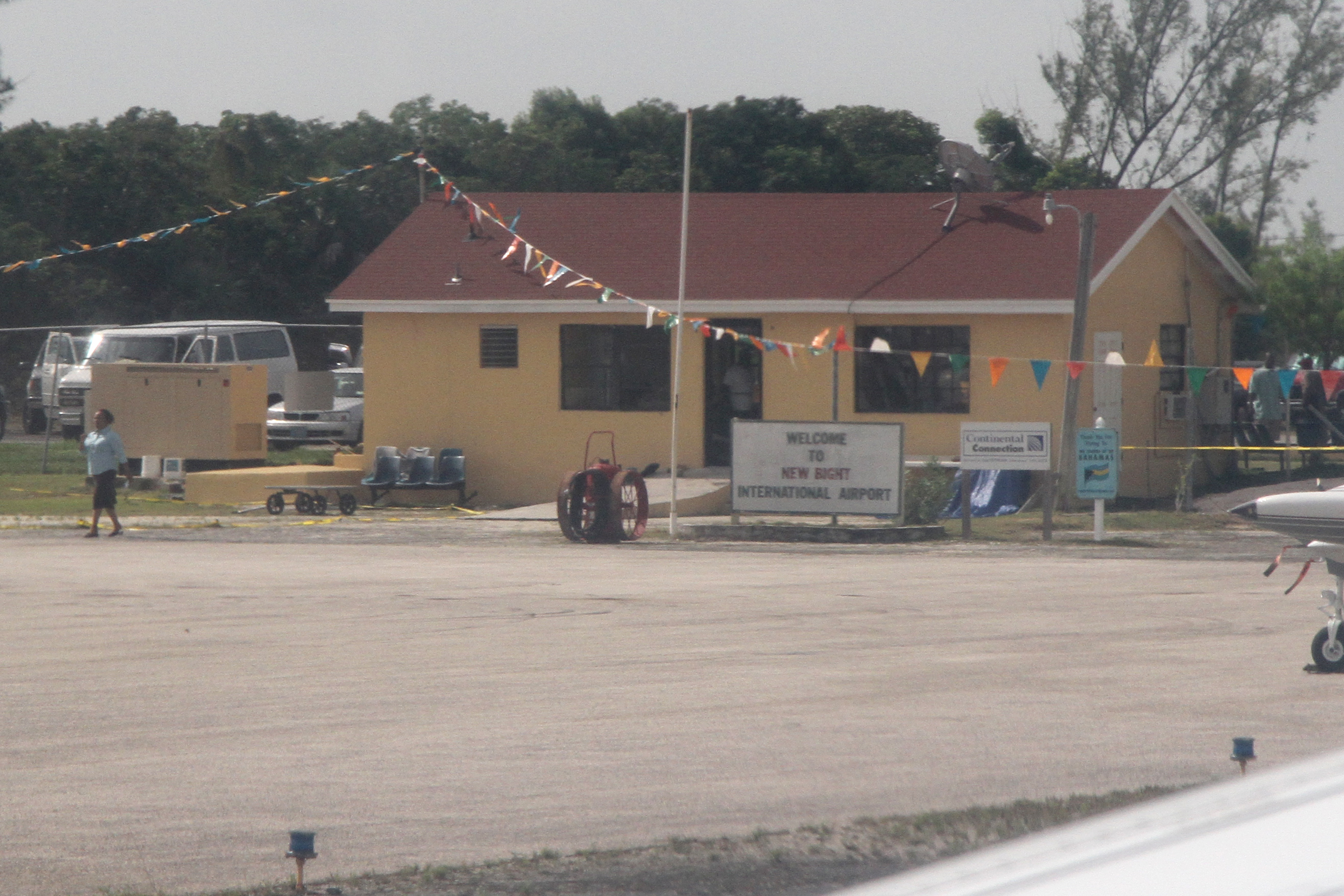
- IATA: TBI; ICAO: MYCB

Summary
- Airport type: Public
- Serves: New Bight, Cat Island, Bahamas
- Elevation AMSL: 5 ft (1.5 m)
- Coordinates: 24°18′55″N 075°27′08″W

Map
- Location in The Bahamas

Runways
Direction	Length		Surface
Direction	m	ft	Surface
09/27	1,539	5,049	Asphalt
- Source: DAFIF

New Bight Airport (IATA: TBI, ICAO: MYCB) is an airport in New Bight on Cat Island in The Bahamas. The airport has domestic passenger flights to one destination, Nassau. The flight to Nassau from New Bight Airport is 84 miles and takes on average 30 minutes.

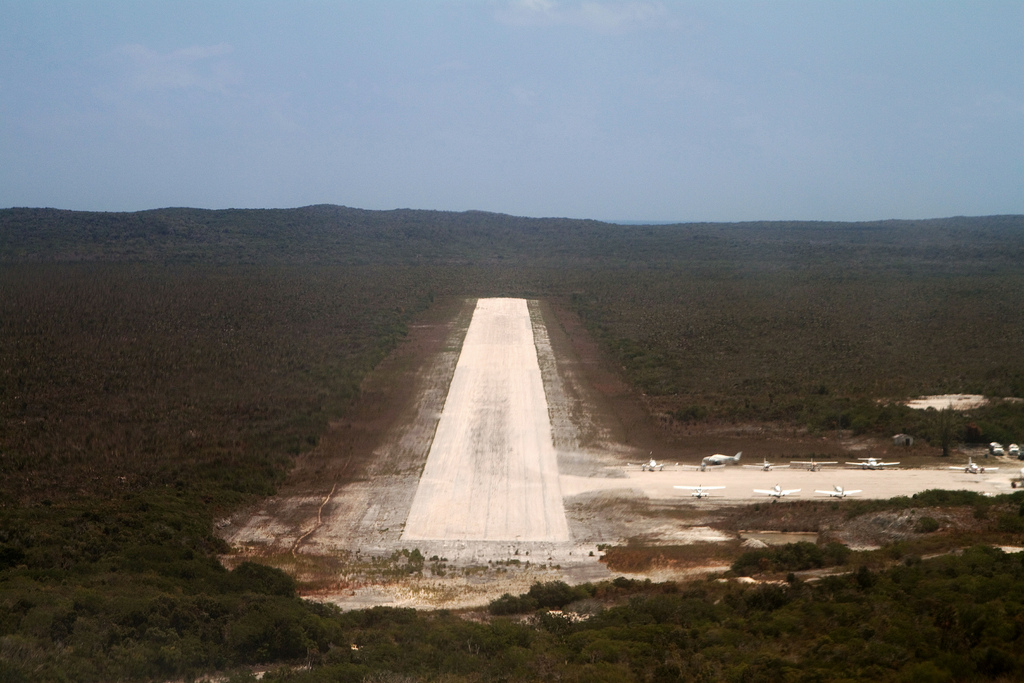
Short final to New Bight International

== Facilities ==
The airport resides at an elevation of 5 ft (1.5 m) above mean sea level. It has one runway designated 09/27 with an asphalt surface measuring 1,539 m × 30 m (5,049 ft × 98 ft).

== Airlines and destinations ==
Airlines	Destinations
Western Air	Nassau

== See also ==
- Arthur's Town Airport (IATA: ATC, ICAO: MYCA) in Arthur's Town on Cat Island
