= Ocean Cay Airport =

- IATA: none; ICAO: MYBO

Summary
- Airport type: Private
- Serves: Ocean Cay
- Location: Bahamas
- Elevation AMSL: 5 ft / 2 m
- Coordinates: 25°25′22.5″N 79°12′34.1″W

Map
- Location of Ocean Cay Airport in the Bahamas

Runways
Direction	Length		Surface
Direction	m	ft	Surface
09/27	503	1,650	Gravel
17/35	576	1,890	Gravel
- Source: Landings.com

Ocean Cay Airport (ICAO: MYBO) is a private use airport located near Ocean Cay, the Bahamas.

== See also ==
- List of airports in the Bahamas
