= Autec Heliport =

- IATA: none; ICAO: MYCZ

Summary
- Airport type: Public
- Serves: Andros Town
- Location: Bahamas
- Elevation AMSL: 10 ft / 3 m
- Coordinates: 24°42′34.2″N 77°46′21.5″W

Map
- Location of Autec Heliport in the Bahamas

Helipads
Number	Length		Surface
Number	m	ft	Surface
1	30	100	Asphalt
2	30	100	Asphalt
3	30	100	Asphalt
4	30	100	Asphalt
- Source: Landings.com

Autec Heliport (ICAO: MYCZ) is a military heliport located 1 nm east-northeast of Andros Town, the Bahamas. The control frequency is 126.3 MHz.

== See also ==
- List of airports in the Bahamas
