= Torch Cay Airport =

Private airport in the Bahamas

- IATA: TCV; ICAO: MYTC

Summary
- Airport type: Private
- Serves: Torch Cay
- Location: Bahamas
- Elevation AMSL: 10 ft (3.0 m)
- Coordinates: 23°23′50.7″N 75°29′49.5″W
- Website: torchcay.com

Map
- Location of Torch Cay Airport in the Exumas, Bahamas

Runways
Direction	Length		Surface
Direction	m	ft	Surface
12/30	1,700	5,700	Asphalt

Torch Cay Airport (IATA: TCV, ICAO: MYTC), also referred to as Torch Cay Exuma Airport (ICAO: MYTC) is a private airport located on the members-only private island of Torch Cay in the Bahamas.

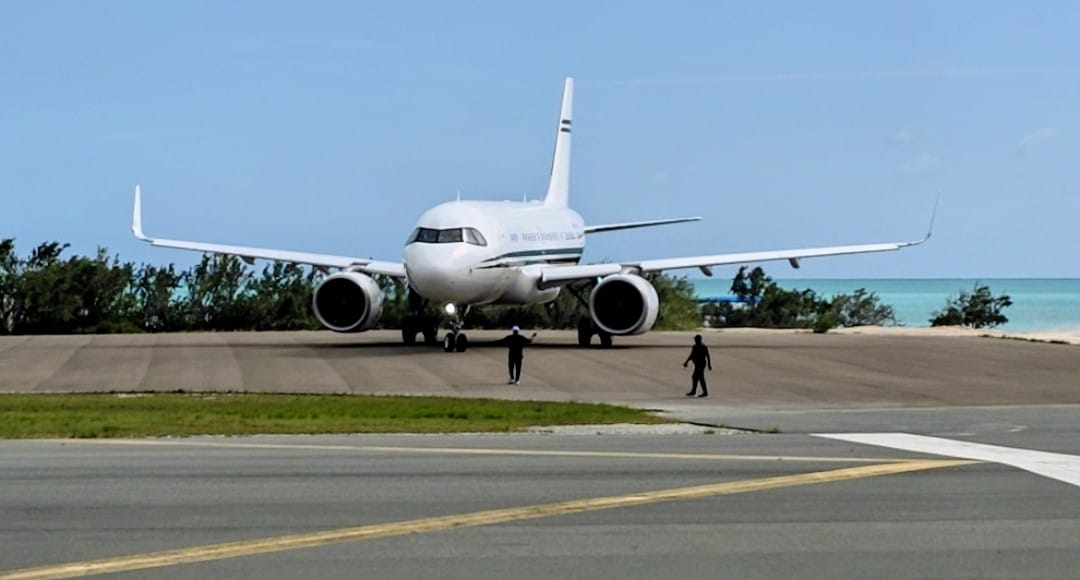
A319 aircraft at Torch Cay airport

Torch Cay Airport was constructed and built to be a leading aviation facility not only in The Bahamas, but across the entire Caribbean. The Torch Cay runway is the largest privately owned airstrip currently in the Caribbean. The Airport was engineered and built by the BHM, the same organization that constructed the new Lynden Pindling International Airport (Nassau International Airport), the Bahamas busiest airport and primary international gateway into the country.

The Torch Cay Airport runway was completed in 2020, and built to accommodate everything from private piston and turbo-prop aircraft, to seaplanes, to large jet aircraft up-to 130 ft (40 m) in length. At just over 5,700 ft (1,700 m), it is also the longest privately owned and operated airstrip in the Bahamas and contains on-site customs and immigration clearance.

== Design and operations ==
The unique Torch Cay runway design allows for a consistent wind direction that is safely aligned with the runway centerline, avoiding crosswind landings. In addition to the Airports spectacular approach over Little Exuma, the eastwardly direction arrival also eliminates any possible noise disturbances to its members and guests. The Torch Cay Airport operates from Sunrise to Sunset 365 days a year.

== The "V" in TCV airport code ==
In 1947, all airport code identifiers expanded to three letters, as just two years earlier IATA The International Air Transport Association was founded. Torch Cay Airport was awarded an IATA airport code in 2022 with TCV. The letter V stands for Vector, a physics term representing direction as well as magnitude, especially as determining the position of one point in space relative to another. For pilots the term Vector is a magnetic heading given to an aircraft by air-traffic control ATC to be flown for a period of time or distance. IATA Code = TCV (Torch Cay Vector)

== Approved aircraft ==
The Torch Cay runway and apron have the ability to accommodate all helicopter, and vertical take-off and landing (VTOL) aircraft, as well as a variety of seaplanes. The facility is rated for all Light-Jets, Midsize-Jets, Heavy-Jets, and Ultra Long-Jets and VIP Airliners including the BBJ 737-9, and the Airbus TwoTwenty and ACJ-Neo.

== See also ==
- List of airports in the Bahamas
