= Hawks Nest Airport =

Hawk's Nest Creek Airport
- IATA: none; ICAO: MYCH

Summary
- Airport type: Public
- Serves: Hawk's Nest Creek
- Location: Bahamas
- Elevation AMSL: 3 ft / 1 m
- Coordinates: 24°9′15.1″N 75°31′13.0″W

Map
- Location of Hawk's Nest Creek Airport in the Bahamas

Runways
Direction	Length		Surface
Direction	m	ft	Surface
08/26	1,402	4,600	Asphalt
- Source: Landings.com

Hawk's Nest Creek Airport (ICAO: MYCH) is a public use airport located near Hawk's Nest Creek, The Bahamas.

== See also ==
- List of airports in the Bahamas
