= Grand Bahama Aux AF Airport =

- IATA: none; ICAO: MYGM

Summary
- Airport type: Public
- Serves: Grand Bahama
- Location: Bahamas
- Elevation AMSL: 7 ft (2.1 m)
- Coordinates: 26°37′54.6″N 78°21′35.4″W

Map
- Location of Grand Bahama Aux AF Airport in the Bahamas

Runways
Direction	Length		Surface
Direction	m	ft	Surface
05/23	2,182	7,160	Asphalt
- Source: Landings.com

Grand Bahama Aux AF Airport (ICAO: MYGM) is a public use airport located 9 nm east of Grand Bahama, the Bahamas.

== History ==
With the permission and cooperation of the British government, the U.S. government was allowed to commence construction of a missile tracking station on Grand Bahama Island in 1950. Construction of the 3500-acre site began in 1951 and was completed in 1954.

Named Grand Bahama Air Force Auxiliary Field and Grand Bahama Air Force Station, the facility commenced operations that same year for tracking unmanned missiles and rockets launched from Cape Canaveral into planar, suborbital and orbital tracks along the Eastern Range. Beginning in the early 1960s, it would also support NASA human spaceflight operations for Project Mercury, Project Gemini, Project Apollo, and the initial stages of the Space Transportation System (STS) program, colloquially known as the Space Shuttle. The single runway airfield provided an aerial port for logistical and personnel support of the ground installation by U.S. military and contracted civilian aircraft.

The USAF facility at Grand Bahama typically employed approximately 300 personnel in what were initially austere facilities that were incrementally upgraded through the late 1960s. The majority were civilian military contractor personnel augmented by three to four uniformed USAF personnel. Most of the assigned personnel were unaccompanied, although a small number of married personnel were later able to bring their families to Grand Bahama Island as upgraded base facilities were constructed. However, the only living quarters on base were for single unaccompanied male personnel, leaving married personnel to rent house trailers or homes on the local economy near the base.

Prior to construction of the current paved runway, the installation had been supplied by USAF cargo aircraft, typically C-47, C-54, or C-123 aircraft, originating from Patrick Air Force Base, Florida or Palm Beach Air Force Base, Florida and landing at a small dirt airstrip at Gold Rock Creek. This would be further augmented by sea with small cargo vessels departing Port Canaveral for Grand Bahama and mooring at a pier at High Rock. Completion of the paved runway adjacent to the ground installation later permitted resupply by C-124 and C-133 aircraft, followed by more modern C-130, C-141, and C-5 aircraft.

With improvements in telemetry, tracking, and communications with crewed and uncrewed spacecraft, the USAF installation was closed and vacated in 1987 and turned over to the Bahamian government on 30 January 1988.

Nearly all traces of the former USAF installation have been removed with a handful of remaining structures in various states of disrepair. The airfield is technically an uncontrolled operational civilian airport, but it is normally unattended and the condition of the runway pavement has deteriorated significantly since the departure of U.S. personnel.

== See also ==
- List of airports in the Bahamas
