= Cistern Field =

Airport in the Bahamas

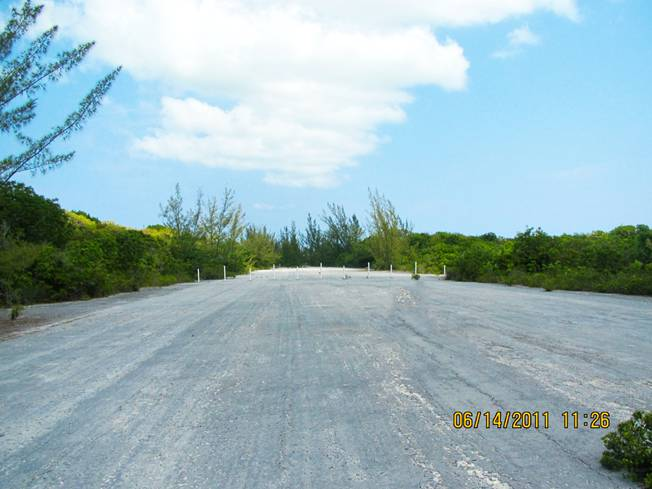
- Airstrip in June 2011
- IATA: none; ICAO: MYBT

Summary
- Airport type: Public
- Serves: Cistern Cay
- Location: Bahamas
- Elevation AMSL: 18 ft / 5 m
- Coordinates: 25°46′46.8″N 77°53′8.2″W

Map
- Location of Cistern Field in the Bahamas

Runways
Direction	Length		Surface
Direction	m	ft	Surface
16/34	686	2,250	Asphalt
- Source: Landings.com

Cistern Field (ICAO: MYBT) is a public use airport located near Cistern Cay, the Bahamas.

== See also ==
- List of airports in the Bahamas
