= Fowl Cay Airport =

- IATA: none; ICAO: MYXA

Summary
- Airport type: Public
- Serves: Fowl Cay
- Location: Bahamas
- Elevation AMSL: 8 ft / 2 m
- Coordinates: 24°16′14.6″N 76°32′27.5″W

Map
- Location of Fowl Cay Airport in the Bahamas

Runways
Direction	Length		Surface
Direction	m	ft	Surface
10/28	317	1,040	Asphalt
- Source: Landings.com

Fowl Cay Airport (ICAO: MYXA) is a public use airport located near Fowl Cay, the Bahamas.

== See also ==
- List of airports in the Bahamas
