= Lee Stocking Airport =

- IATA: none; ICAO: MYEL

Summary
- Airport type: Public
- Serves: Lee Stocking
- Location: Bahamas
- Elevation AMSL: 5 ft / 2 m
- Coordinates: 23°46′32.1″N 76°6′13.4″W

Map
- Location of Lee Stocking Airport in the Bahamas

Runways
Direction	Length		Surface
Direction	m	ft	Surface
12/30	985	3,230	Asphalt
- Source: Landings.com

Lee Stocking Airport (ICAO: MYEL) is a public use airport located near Lee Stocking, the Bahamas.

== See also ==
- List of airports in the Bahamas
