= Andros Central Airport =

Twin Lakes Airport
- IATA: none; ICAO: none

Summary
- Airport type: Defunct
- Serves: Andros Central
- Location: Bahamas
- Elevation AMSL: 10 ft / 3 m
- Coordinates: 24°43′32.8″N 77°59′17.4″W

Map
- Location of Twin Lakes Airport in the Bahamas

Runways
Direction	Length		Surface
Direction	ft	m	Surface
10/28	5,951	1,814	UNKNOWN
- Source: Landings.com

Twin Lakes Airport was a public use airport located 15 nm north of Andros Central, the Bahamas. The airport is closed.

== See also ==
- List of airports in the Bahamas
