= Leaf Cay Airport =

- IATA: none; ICAO: MYXD

Summary
- Airport type: Private
- Serves: Leaf Cay
- Location: Bahamas
- Elevation AMSL: 5 ft / 2 m
- Coordinates: 24°8′57.9″N 76°28′22.5″W

Map
- Location of Leaf Cay Airport in the Bahamas

Runways
| Direction | Length | | Surface |
| Direction | m | ft | Surface |
|---|---|---|---|
| 09/27 | 366 | 1,200 | Gravel |
- Source: Landings.com

Leaf Cay Airport (ICAO: MYXD) is a private use airport located near Leaf Cay, the Bahamas.

The airstrip was still in use as of 2009. However, as of 2025, satellite photos and commercial listings show the airstrip to be heavily damaged and overgrown with trees and unusable for landing.

== See also ==
- List of airports in the Bahamas
