= Big Whale Cay Airport =

- IATA: MYX4; ICAO: MYBW

Summary
- Airport type: Public
- Serves: Big Whale Cay
- Location: Bahamas
- Elevation AMSL: 16 ft / 5 m
- Coordinates: 25°24′7.2″N 77°47′18.3″W

Map
- Location of Big Whale Cay Airport in the Bahamas

Runways
Direction	Length		Surface
Direction	m	ft	Surface
07/25	1,219	4,000	Asphalt
- Source: Landings.com

Big Whale Cay Airport (IATA: MYX4, ICAO: MYBW) is a public use airport located near Big Whale Cay, the Bahamas.

== See also ==
- List of airports in the Bahamas
