= LeAir =

Bahamian airline

LeAir Charter Services Ltd.
IATA	ICAO	Call sign
—	LSL	Lee Air
- Founded: 1996
- Hubs: Lynden Pindling International Airport
- Fleet size: 3
- Destinations: 4
- Website: https://www.flyleair.com

LeAir Charter Services Ltd. is a small regional airline based in Nassau, Bahamas, at Lynden Pindling International Airport (LPIA). The company was founded in 1996.

The airline operates scheduled flights within the Bahamas (Nassau, Andros Town, Great Harbour Cay, Mangrove Cay) as well as charters in the Bahamas and the Caribbean.

== Fleet ==
The three-aircraft LeAir fleet consists of the following:

LeAir fleet
Aircraft	In fleet	Orders
Cessna 402	1	0
Embraer 110 Bandeirante	2	0
Total	3	0

== Accidents and incidents ==
- On November 17, 2022, a Embraer 110 Bandeirante (registered C6-CAB), charter flight operated by LeAir Charter Services, flying from Cap-Haïtien International Airport, Haiti, to Lynden Pindling International Airport, Nassau, Bahamas, was substantially damaged when the nosewheel collapsed and it skidded off of the runway when landing at Nassau. During the landing approach, the crew observed problems with the landing gear. After performing a low pass so that the landing gear could be observed by the control tower, the flight circled for several minutes to burn off fuel before another approach to landing, during which the nosewheel collapsed. No injuries were reported.
