= Sampson Cay Airport =

Big Sampson Cay Airport
- IATA: none; ICAO: MYXH

Summary
- Airport type: Private
- Serves: Big Sampson Cay
- Location: Bahamas
- Elevation AMSL: 15 ft / 5 m
- Coordinates: 24°12′58.6″N 76°28′42.9″W

Map
- Location of Big Sampson Cay Airport in the Bahamas

Runways
Direction	Length		Surface
Direction	m	ft	Surface
14/32	610	2,000	Gravel
- Source: Landings.com

Big Sampson Cay Airport (ICAO: MYXH) is a private use airport located near Big Sampson Cay, the Bahamas.

== See also ==
- List of airports in the Bahamas
