= Hard Bargain Airport =

- IATA: none; ICAO: MYLR

Summary
- Airport type: Public
- Serves: Long Island
- Location: Bahamas
- Elevation AMSL: 5 ft / 2 m
- Coordinates: 23°0′40.3″N 74°54′21.2″W

Map
- Location of Hard Bargain Airport in the Bahamas

Runways
Direction	Length		Surface
Direction	m	ft	Surface
15/33	914	3,000	Asphalt
- Source: Landings.com

Hard Bargain Airport (ICAO: MYLR) is a public use airport located near Long Island, the Bahamas.

== See also ==
- List of airports in the Bahamas
