= Rudder Cut Cay Airport =

Airport in Bahamas

- IATA: none; ICAO: none

Summary
- Airport type: Public
- Serves: Rudder Cut Cay
- Location: Bahamas
- Elevation AMSL: 10 ft / 3 m
- Coordinates: 23°53′11.1″N 76°15′10.2″W

Map
- Location of Rudder Cut Cay Airport in the Bahamas

Runways
Direction	Length		Surface
Direction	m	ft	Surface
09/27	655	2,150	Gravel
- Source: Landings.com

Rudder Cut Cay Airport is a public use airport located near Rudder Cut Cay, the Bahamas.

== See also ==
- List of airports in the Bahamas
