= Pitts Town Airport =

Pitts Town Point Airport
- IATA: PWN; ICAO: MYCP

Summary
- Airport type: Private
- Serves: Pitts Town Point
- Location: Bahamas
- Elevation AMSL: 5 ft / 1.5 m
- Coordinates: 22°49′47.0″N 74°20′47.1″W

Map
- Location of Pitts Town Point Airport in the Bahamas

Runways
Direction	Length		Surface
Direction	m	ft	Surface
09/27	1,067	3,500	Asphalt
- Source: Landings.com

Pitts Town Point Airport (IATA: PWN, ICAO: MYCP) is a public use airport located near Pitts Town Point on Crooked Island, Bahamas in the Bahamas.

== See also ==
- List of airports in the Bahamas
