= New Providence Airport =

- IATA: PID; ICAO: MYPI

Summary
- Airport type: Private
- Serves: Paradise Island
- Location: Bahamas
- Elevation AMSL: 4 ft / 1 m
- Coordinates: 25°4′45″N 77°17′36″W

Map
- Location of New Providence Airport in the Bahamas
- Source: Landings.com

New Providence Airport (IATA: PID, ICAO: MYPI) was a private use airport located on Paradise Island, the Bahamas. It closed in 1999 and the land incorporated into the island resort.

== See also ==
- List of airports in the Bahamas
