= Lt. Whale Cay Airport =

Little Whale Cay Berry Islands Airport
- IATA: none; ICAO: MYBX

Summary
- Airport type: Public
- Serves: Little Whale Cay
- Location: Bahamas
- Elevation AMSL: 5 ft / 2 m
- Coordinates: 25°26′58.5″N 77°45′34.2″W

Map
- Location of Little Whale Cay Berry Islands Airport in the Bahamas

Runways
Direction	Length		Surface
Direction	m	ft	Surface
08/26	533	1,750	Asphalt
- Source: Landings.com

Little Whale Cay Berry Islands Airport (ICAO: MYBX) is a public use airport located on Little Whale Cay, the Bahamas.

== See also ==
- List of airports in the Bahamas
