= Cat Island, Bahamas =

Island District in The Bahamas

District of Cat Island
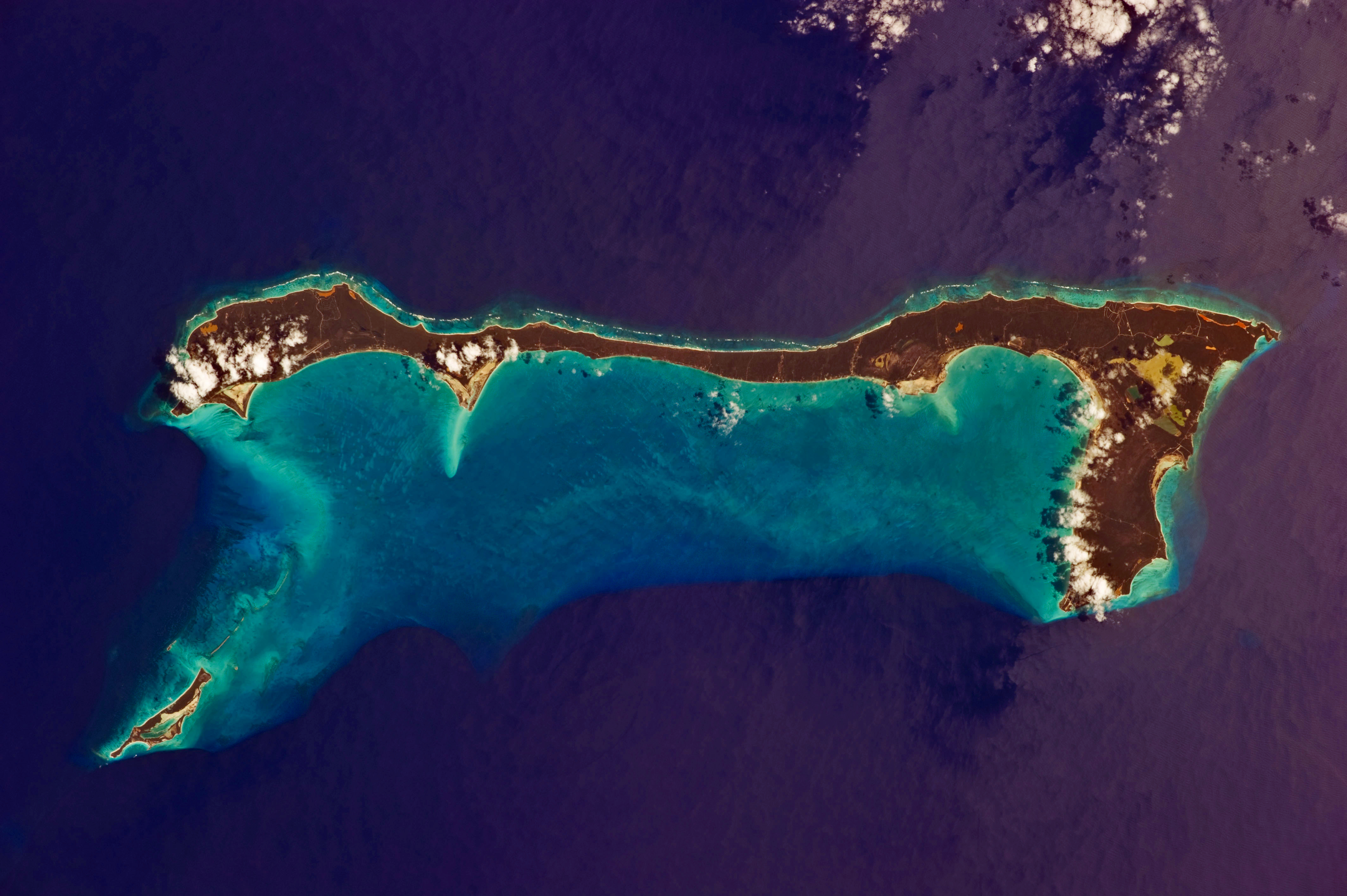
- Astronaut photograph of Cat Island

- Coordinates: 24°25′N 75°31′W
- Country: The Bahamas
- Island: Cat Island
- Established: 1799

Government
  - Type: District Council
  - Chief Councillor: Kevin Brown
  - Deputy Chief Councillor: Alvin Thurston
  - Island Administrator: Gilbert Kemp

Area
  - Total: 389 km^{2} (150 sq mi)

Population (2022)
  - Total: 1,602
  - Density: 3.9/km^{2} (10/sq mi)
- Time zone: UTC−5 (EST)
  - Summer (DST): UTC−4 (EDT)
- Area code: 242

Cat Island is located in the Bahamas, and is one of its districts. Cat Island also has the nation's highest point, Mount Alvernia (formerly known as Como Hill). It rises to 63 metres (207 ft) and is topped by a monastery called The Hermitage. This assembly of buildings was erected by the Franciscan "Brother Jerome" (John Hawes).

== History ==
The Indigenous Lucayan people called the island Guanima, meaning "middle waters land". The first white settlers were Loyalists fleeing the American Revolution, who arrived in 1783. The island may have been named after Arthur Catt, a pirate, or may be a reference to its one-time large population of feral cats.

Historically, the island gained wealth from cotton plantations, but slash and burn farming is now the main way of life for Cat Islanders. An economic crop is Croton eluteria (called also cascarilla) bark, which is gathered and shipped to Italy where it becomes a main ingredient in medicines, scents and Campari.

Until written accounts were found, Cat Island was thought to be Guanahani or San Salvador, the first island Christopher Columbus arrived at in the Americas. In 1926, an Act of Parliament was passed to rename the island Cat Island (and to rename Watling Island, as it was then, San Salvador).

== Demographics ==
According to the 2010 census, the population of Cat Island was 1,522. The main settlements are Dumfries, New Bight, Arthur's Town (capital settlement and childhood home of Sidney Poitier), Orange Creek, and Port Howe.

New Bight Airport and Arthur's Town Airport serve the island.

== Notable people ==
- Dada 5000, Bahamian-American mixed martial artist
- Exuma, Bahamian musician
- Sidney Poitier, Bahamian-American actor

== Landmarks and attractions ==
At the top of 63 metres (207 ft) Como Hill is Mt. Alvernia Hermitage on Mount Alvernia, the highest point in The Bahamas. This small stone monastery built by hand by the architect hermit, Father Jerome, is at the peak and accessible by a trek up a steep rocky incline.

Just south of the Hermitage are the ruins of Armbrister Plantation.

Armbrister Creek flows into a clear lake called "Boiling Point" or "Boiling Hole" whose tidal conditions cause bubbles and burps, the conditions which lead to folklore of a sea monster below its surface. Rays and baby sharks can be found in the lake. In addition, numerous birds can be found nesting along its mangrove fringe.

Located in Bain Town is another lake. This 20 metres (66 ft) wide 3 metres (10 ft) deep lake called Mermaid Hole is said in local folklore to be home to a mermaid that lives amongst the 4 bed holes within that lead to caverns and passageways.

One of the major attractions in Cat Island Bahamas is the Big Blue Hole near Orange Creek at Dickies Road. The hole is very deep and it has a strong undercurrents flowing into the sea. Many objects such as dead farm animals tossed into the lake ended up reaching the ocean through its caverns. Local folklore says that a monster that devours horses lived in Big Blue Hole. This folklore is said to still scare local fisherman from venturing too far into this freshwater lake.

Dickie's Road goes east to Griffin Bat Cave, once a hideout for slaves.

Sitting atop a ridge alongside the road in the settlement of Old Bight is St. Francis of Assisi Catholic Church, built by Father Jerome, with frescos, engravings and sculptures.

In the Port Howe area of Cat Island, are the ruins of an 18th-century plantation at Deveaux House mansion. It was given to Colonel Andrew Deveaux in 1783 for recapturing Nassau from the Spanish.

In Knowles, there is a museum called the Columbus World Centre Museum. In Arthur's Town there is the childhood home of Sir Sidney Poitier, Academy Award winner.

== Places ==
- Arthur's Town
- Old Bight
- New Bight

== Administrative divisions ==
- Township of Arthur's Town
- Township of The Bight
