= Little Whale Cay =

- Private Island
- Lt. Whale
- Coordinates: 25°26′54″N 077°45′36″W
- Country: The Bahamas
- Island chain: Berry Islands

Government
  - Type: Privately owned

Area
  - Total: 0.15 sq mi (0.39 km^{2})

Population
  - Total: up to 25

Little Whale Cay is a private island. Little Whale Cay is located 140 miles (230 km) southeast of Fort Lauderdale, Florida, and approximately 40 miles (64 km) north of Nassau. This 93-acre (38 ha) island is part of the Berry Islands in the Bahamas.

== History ==
Little Whale Cay was developed in the 1940s as a private island residence by Wallace Groves, an American businessman with a strong interest in the Bahamas. The island was developed exclusively as a home, with no commercial activities. Under Groves, Little Whale Cay got its private harbour and a 2,230-foot runway, capable of accommodating twin-engine planes, sea planes, and helicopters. In the 1950s, all of the land was either landscaped or occupied by buildings. At the time, there were about fifty inhabitants working on the Cay, having their own church and community hall. The church was under the Church of England and bore the name of "Our Lady, Star of the Sea." Residents and employees during Groves' ownership reported that he ran the island in a police-state fashion.

In 1984, Groves sold the island to Peter Austin, a British millionaire. Austin transformed the property and the three houses built under Groves (Little Whale, Peacock, and Flamingo) into rented sea-view villas.

In the early 2020s, the island was listed for sale for US$35 million. Little Whale Cay hosted commercial guests until it was sold in 2024 to an anonymous private buyer who once again restored it as a private home.

== Facilities ==
The island is served by the Lt. Whale Cay Airport (ICAO: MYBX) and by a small harbour.

== Wildlife ==
Manatees and green turtles are sometimes present in the waters surrounding the island. 34 different species of birds found at Little Whale Cay include flamingo, Bahamian duck, and Bahama woodstar hummingbird.

The origin of many of the birds present on the Cay can be traced back to Wallace Groves' bird collection.
