= Andros Town International Airport =

Andros Town Airport Fresh Creek Airport
- IATA: ASD; ICAO: MYAF

Summary
- Airport type: Public
- Operator: Government
- Serves: Andros Town, Andros Island, Bahamas
- Elevation AMSL: 11 ft / 3.5 m
- Coordinates: 24°41′54″N 077°47′44″W

Map
- Location in The Bahamas

Runways
Direction	Length		Surface
Direction	m	ft	Surface
09/27	1,237	4,058	Asphalt
- Source: DAFIF

Andros Town Airport or Andros Town International Airport (IATA: ASD, ICAO: MYAF) is an airport serving Andros Town on Andros Island in the Bahamas. It is also known as Fresh Creek Airport.

It is one of commercial airports on Andros Island, where the other airports are San Andros Airport at Nicholls Town, the Clarence A. Bain Airport at Mangrove Cay and Congo Town Airport in South Andros. San Andros Airport is served by one airline, but few tourists actually fly there. The airport is like any small Bahamian airport, with check-in, restrooms, and customs/immigration. There are no gift shops or restaurants.

== Facilities ==
The airport is at an elevation of 5 ft (1.5 m) above mean sea level. It has one runway designated 09/27 with an asphalt surface measuring 1,237 m × 30 m (4,058 ft × 98 ft).

== Airlines and destinations ==
Airlines	Destinations
LeAir	Nassau
