= Treasure Cay =

- Location within Bahamas Location within North Atlantic
- Coordinates: 26°40′34″N 77°17′36″W
- Country: Bahamas
- Island: Abaco
- District: North Abaco
- Elevation: 0 m (0 ft)

Population (2010)
  - Total: 1,187
- Time zone: UTC-5 (Eastern Time Zone)
- Area code: 242

Treasure Cay is a parcel of land connected to Great Abaco Island in the north of the Bahamas. It has a population of 1,187 as of the 2010 Bahamian census.

There are two resorts: Bahama Beach Club developed by Businessman Craig H. Roberts and Treasure Cay Beach Hotel, Marina & Golf resort, condos, villas, and private homes, many for rent. Located within are bars, restaurants, shops, and a bakery, a ceramic shop. There is a large marina that hosts seasonal fishing tournaments, tennis courts, and a golf course. Green Turtle Cay Ferry Dock is located on the island.

== History ==
The settlement of Carleton Point, named after Sir Guy Carleton, was founded in 1783 on the northern end of Sand Banks Cay by about 600 Loyalists fleeing the post-Revolutionary United States. A hurricane hit in 1785, and the settlement was later deserted.

== Transportation ==
The area is served by Treasure Cay Airport.
