= Torch Cay, Exuma =

Island in the Bahamas

Torch Cay
- Location within Bahamas

Geography
- Location: Atlantic Ocean
- Coordinates: 23°23′50.7″N 75°29′49.5″W
- Type: Cay
- Archipelago: Lucayan Archipelago
- Area: 707 acres (286 ha)

Administration
- Bahamas

Additional information
- Official website: www.torchcay.com

Torch Cay is a privately owned island located east of Little Exuma at the southern end of the Exuma island chain in the Bahamas. The island covers approximately 707 acres (286 hectares), making it the largest private island in the country. Its name derives from the white torch tree (Amyris elemifera), which grows among the island's native vegetation.

Torch Cay is home to Torch Cay Airport, a private airstrip that allows international arrivals and customs clearance for private aircraft, including long-range and heavy jets.

== History ==
The island was originally known locally as God Rest the Dead Cay, a name attributed to Captain Mingo Rolle during the early period of European settlement in the Exumas. Over time, the island's name changed, including periods when it was known as Blue Island and Hog Cay during its use as a British farming settlement in the early 18th century.

In 1706, regional trade and shipping were disrupted during the height of piracy in the Bahamas. Nassau and its surrounding islands became associated with the so-called "Republic of Pirates," a loosely organized maritime regime based on privateer and pirate codes. During this period, Torch Cay was affected by pirate activity until British control was re-established in 1718.

In 2022, the owners of Torch Cay entered into a development agreement for a mixed-use resort project that includes a marina, residential lots, a beach club and spa, and a golf course designed by Coore & Crenshaw.

== Topography and climate ==
Torch Cay extends along an east-west axis and features a ridged coastline with elevated viewpoints overlooking the surrounding seascape. Much of the island rises above 65 feet (20 m) in elevation, including areas north of the airport runway and at existing residential sites. The island's highest point reaches approximately 128 feet (39 m), making it the highest elevation in the Exuma island chain.

Because much of the island slopes inward, rainfall drains toward a central basin rather than directly into the sea, creating conditions suitable for agriculture. This basin is sheltered from prevailing trade winds by the surrounding hills. The island also contains approximately 3 kilometers of historic limestone stone walls, built by early British settlers using locally quarried rock to enclose crops and livestock. Torch Cay's soils are influenced in part by Saharan dust carried across the Atlantic, which contributes iron-rich red soil.

== Marine and wildlife ==
The waters surrounding Torch Cay support a variety of marine species, including green sea turtles, southern stingrays, spiny lobster, conch, dolphins, nurse sharks, sea hares, spider crabs, and starfish. In deeper offshore waters north of the island, species such as bluefin tuna, grouper, mahi-mahi, wahoo, kingfish, marlin, snapper, barracuda, amberjack, bonito, swordfish, and mackerel are found. The shallow waters near the island's western shoreline are used for bonefishing.

On land, Torch Cay is home to several reptile and bird species, including iguanas, geckos, anoles, Cuban parrots, belted kingfishers, white-crowned pigeons, and egrets. Peafowl have also been introduced to the island.

== Privacy and access ==
Torch Cay is privately owned and restricts access to residents, members, and authorized staff. The island contains a private airport with a 6,000-foot (1,829 m) runway capable of accommodating light, midsize, and heavy private aircraft. Customs and immigration services are available for authorized international arrivals.

The island is approximately a 40-minute drive and a 10-minute boat ride from Exuma International Airport on Great Exuma. It is also accessible by boat, including water taxis and ferries.

== In popular culture ==
Torch Cay served as a filming location for the 2006 Disney film Pirates of the Caribbean: Dead Man's Chest.

== See also ==
- List of islands of The Bahamas
