= Lee Stocking Island =

Island of the Exuma Cays, Bahamas

- Location within Bahamas

Geography
- Location: Atlantic Ocean
- Coordinates: 23.7721°N 76.0998°W
- Archipelago: Lucayan Archipelago

Administration
- Bahamas

Additional information
- Time zone: EST (UTC-5)
  - Summer (DST): EDT (UTC-4)
- ISO code: BS-EX

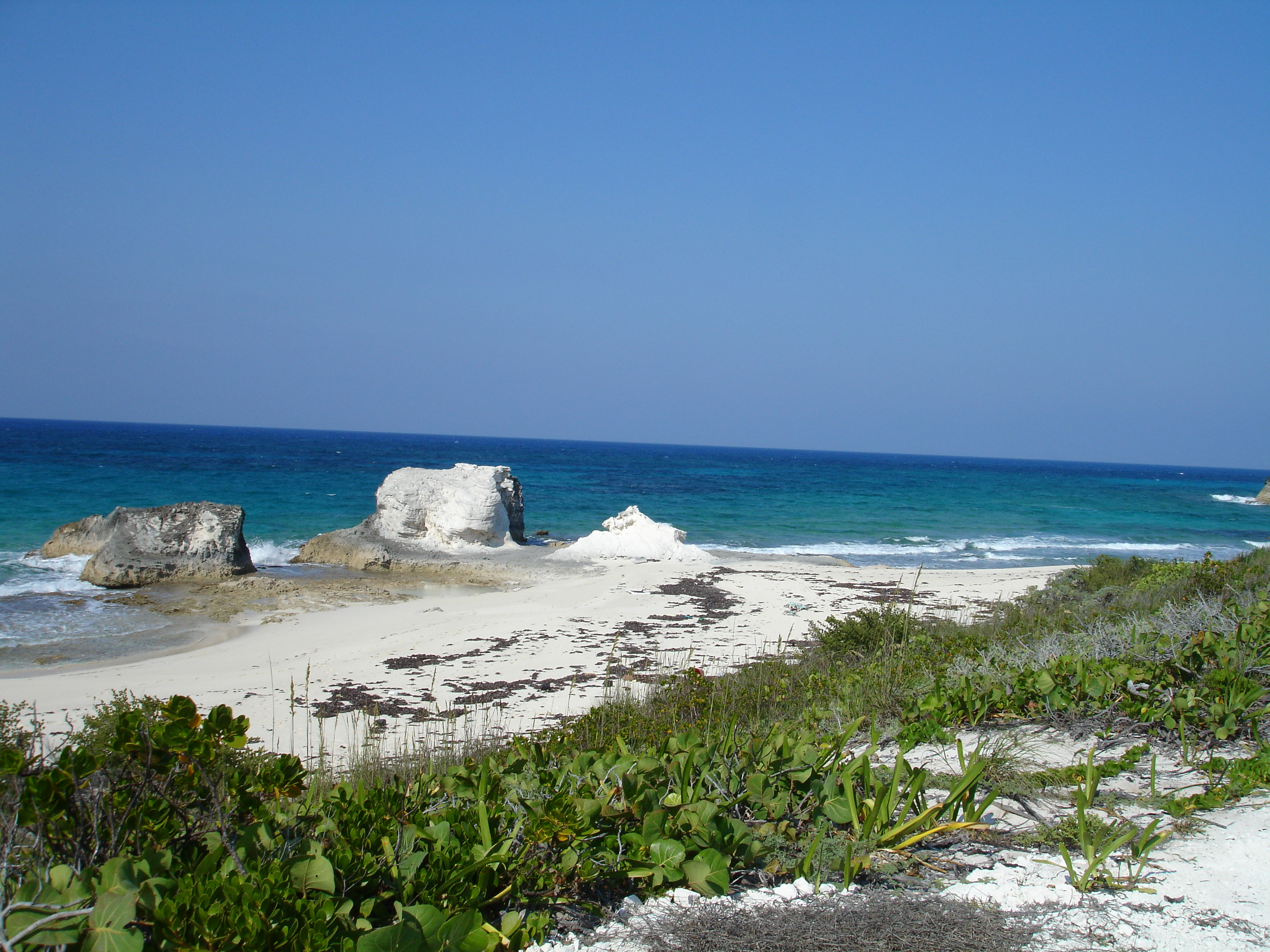
Front side of Lee Stocking Island

Lee Stocking Island is an island in the Bahamas, located in the district of Exuma.

The island was host to a marine research facility from 1984 to 2012, which was connected to NOAA. Stromatolites are found offshore of the island.

A map of 1823 shows it was actually named, “Leeward Stocking Island”. In the days before Google Earth, map makers drew it as a stocking. Upwind towards the predominant South East Tradewinds was “Windward Stocking”. Later in 1898, the name was noted as “Leonard Stocking Island”.
