= Cape Eleuthera Airport =

- IATA: CEL; ICAO: MYEC

Summary
- Airport type: Defunct
- Serves: Cape Eleuthera
- Location: Bahamas
- Elevation AMSL: 9 ft / 3 m
- Coordinates: 24°47′25.2″N 76°17′40.8″W

Map
- Location of Cape Eleuthera Airport in the Bahamas

Runways
Direction	Length		Surface
Direction	m	ft	Surface
11/29	1,969	6,460	Asphalt
- Source: Landings.com

Cape Eleuthera Airport (IATA: CEL, ICAO: MYEC) was a public use airport located 3 nm east-southeast of Cape Eleuthera, The Bahamas. The airport is closed, and the runway is not usable.

== See also ==
- List of airports in the Bahamas
