= Arthur's Town Airport =

Airport on Cat Island, Bahamas

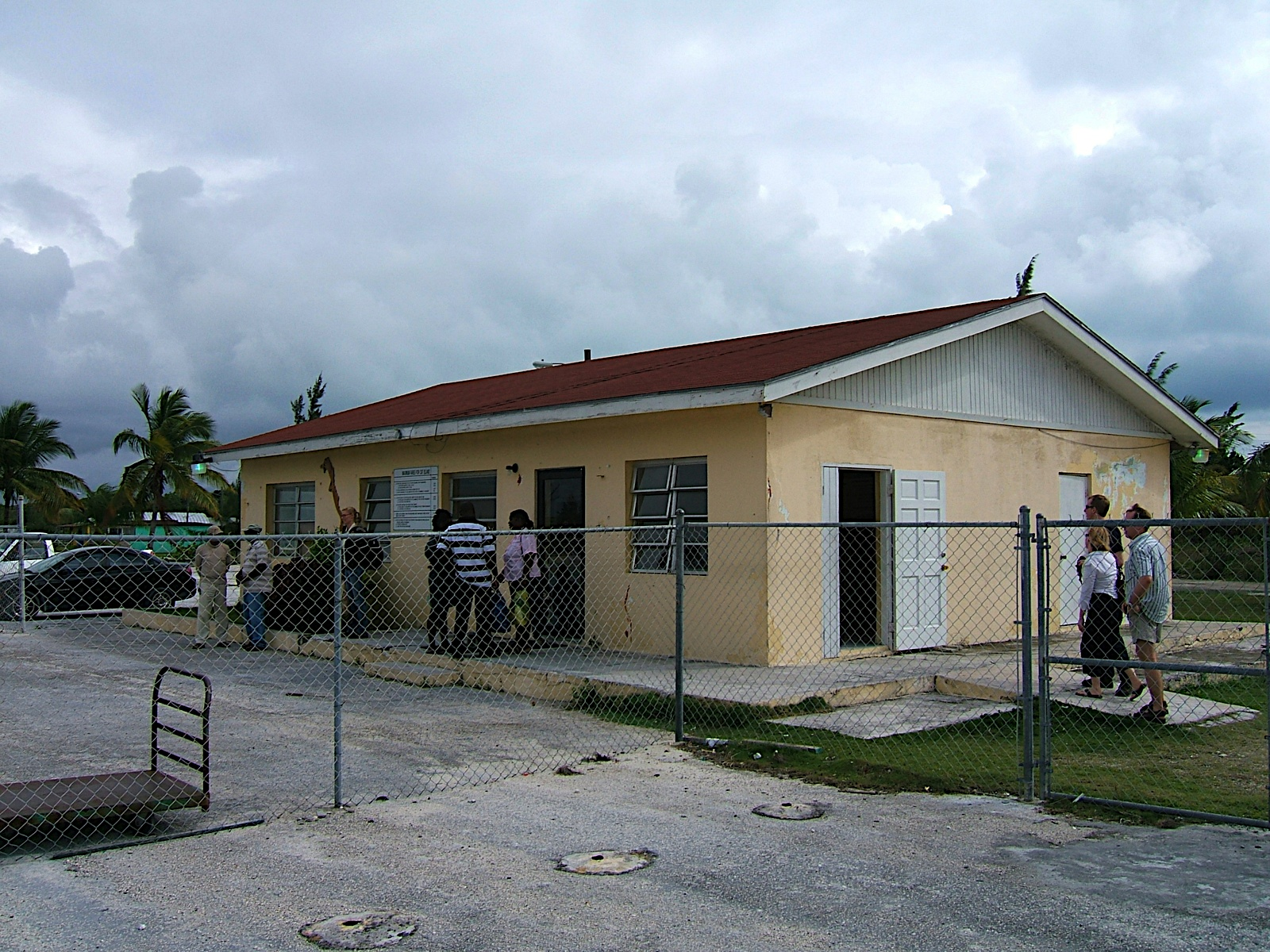
- IATA: ATC; ICAO: MYCA

Summary
- Airport type: Public
- Location: Arthur's Town, Bahamas
- Elevation AMSL: 18 ft / 5 m
- Coordinates: 24°37′46″N 075°40′26″W

Map
- Location in The Bahamas

Runways
Direction	Length		Surface
Direction	m	ft	Surface
12/30	2,138	7,014	Asphalt
- Source: DAFIF

Arthur's Town Airport (IATA: ATC, ICAO: MYCA) is an airport in Arthur's Town on Cat Island in the Bahamas.

== Charter flights ==
Aeroshares Charter, LLC services Cat Island from worldwide locations.

Charter service is also available from Florida or Nassau.
