= Arthur's Town =

Town in The Bahamas

- Town
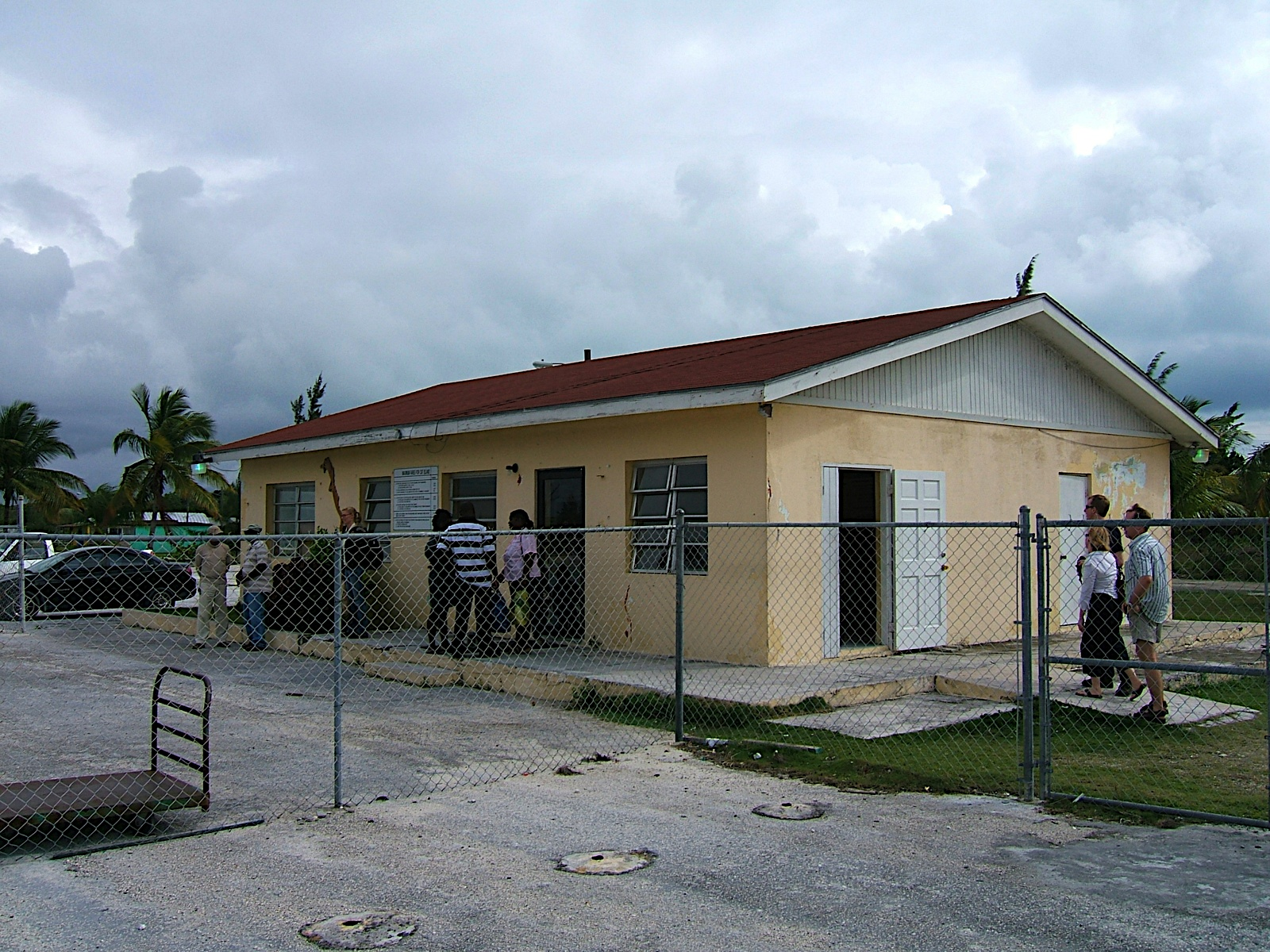
- Cat Island airport terminal

- Location within Bahamas
- Coordinates: 24°39′14″N 75°43′42″W
- Country: Bahamas
- Island: Cat Island

Population (2010)
  - Total: 143
- Time zone: UTC-05:00 (EST)
- Area code: 242

Arthur's Town is a town in the Bahamas. It is located on Cat Island. The population is 143 as of the 2010 census.

Bahamian-American actor Sidney Poitier was raised around Arthur's Town.

== Transportation ==
The village is served by Arthur's Town Airport.
