= Clarence A. Bain Airport =

- IATA: MAY; ICAO: MYAB

Summary
- Airport type: Public
- Operator: Government
- Location: Mangrove Cay, Andros Island, Bahamas
- Elevation AMSL: 19 ft / 6 m
- Coordinates: 24°17′16″N 077°41′05″W

Map
- Location in The Bahamas

Runways
Direction	Length		Surface
Direction	m	ft	Surface
09/27	1,524	5,000	Asphalt
- Source: DAFIF

Clarence A. Bain Airport (IATA: MAY, ICAO: MYAB) is an airport serving Mangrove Cay, one of the districts of the Bahamas, on Andros Island.

== Facilities ==
The airport resides at an elevation of 19 ft (5.8 m) above mean sea level. It has one runway designated 09/27 with an asphalt surface measuring 1,524 m × 23 m (5,000 ft × 75 ft).

== Airlines and destinations ==
Airlines	Destinations
LeAir	Nassau
