= Moore's Island =

District of the Bahamas

Coordinates: 26°18′N 77°33′W

The Location of the District of Moore's Island

Moore's Island is one of the districts of the Bahamas, on the Abaco Islands.

Moore's Island is a cay, 28 miles (45 km) to the west of the main island of Abaco. It is approximately 7 miles (11 km) long and 3.5 miles (5.6 km) wide. It has two settlements, Hard Bargain, which is the capital, and the other settlement is the Bight. The population has been reported as 950.

To arrive to Moore's Island by boat traveling from Sandy Point one passes Gorda Cay (Castaway Cay); Long Rock can be passed on either side, staying offshore in deep waters because inland passage is too risky. Then one passes south Channel Cay (Stake Cay) which has a light tower. After passing Channel Cay a direct approach is taken 6 feet (1.8 m) to the north end of Moore's Island to locate Hard Bargain.

Olympic Gold Medalist Steven Gardiner went to Moores Island All-Age School. He was part of the Exterminators Track and Field Club, Coached by Pastor Anthony Williams. Elroy McBride who ran at the Pan American Games and World Championships also trained here.
