= West End Airport =

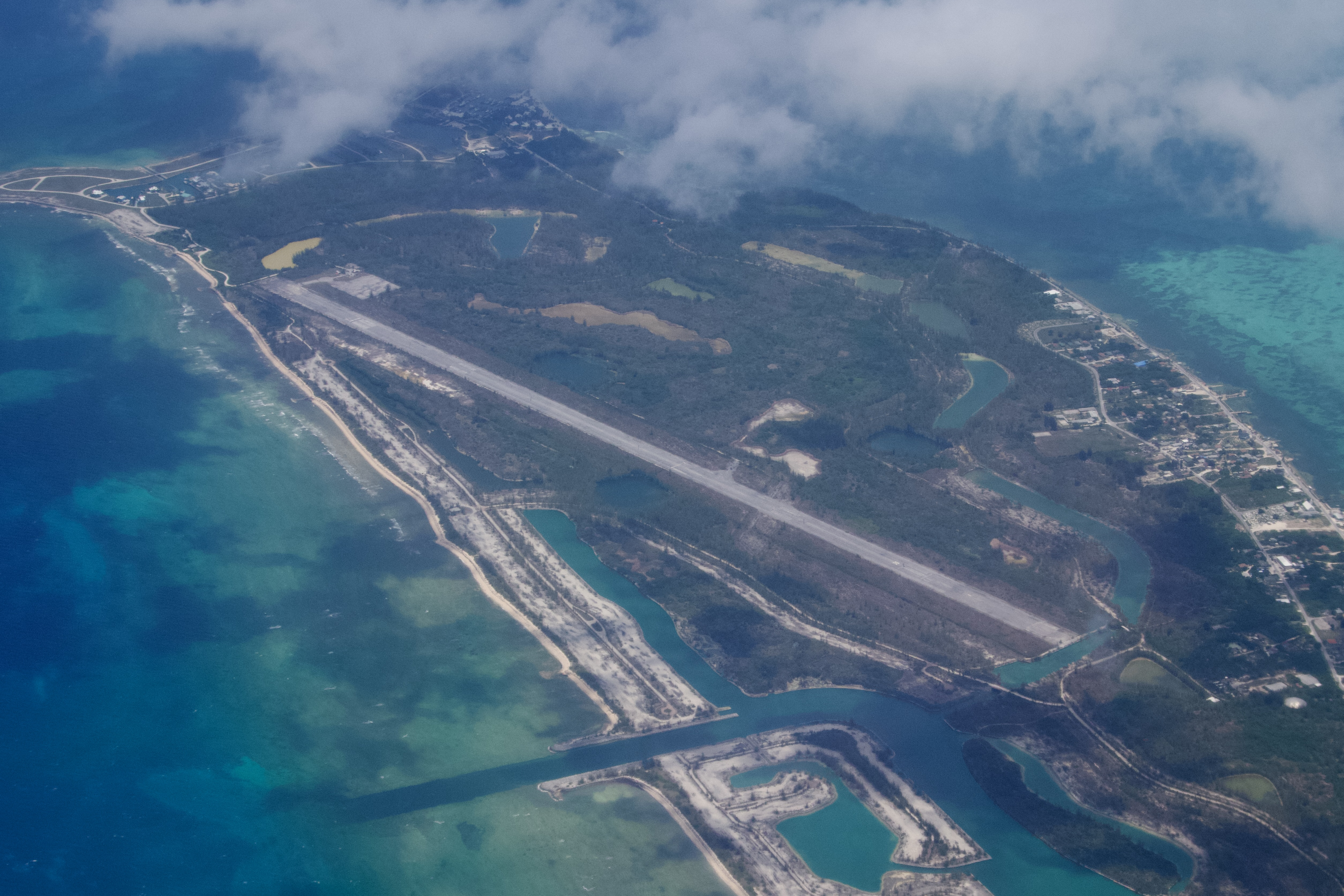
- IATA: WTD; ICAO: MYGW

Summary
- Airport type: Private
- Owner/Operator: Old Bahama Bay Resort
- Serves: West End, Grand Bahama
- Location: West End, Bahamas
- Elevation AMSL: 5 ft / 2 m
- Coordinates: 26°41′07″N 078°58′30″W
- Website: www.oldbahamabayresorts.com

Map
- Location in the Bahamas

Runways
Direction	Length		Surface
Direction	m	ft	Surface
n/a	2,438	7,999	n/a
11/29	2,438	7,999	n/a
- Source: Great Circle Mapper

West End Airport (IATA: WTD, ICAO: MYGW) is an airport that serves West End, Grand Bahama. While smaller than the other airport on the island located in Freeport, this airport has a paved runway 7,999 feet in length as well as onsite customs and immigration. This airport currently serves private planes and charters. The airport features the westernmost runway in the entire Bahamian archipelago.

== History ==
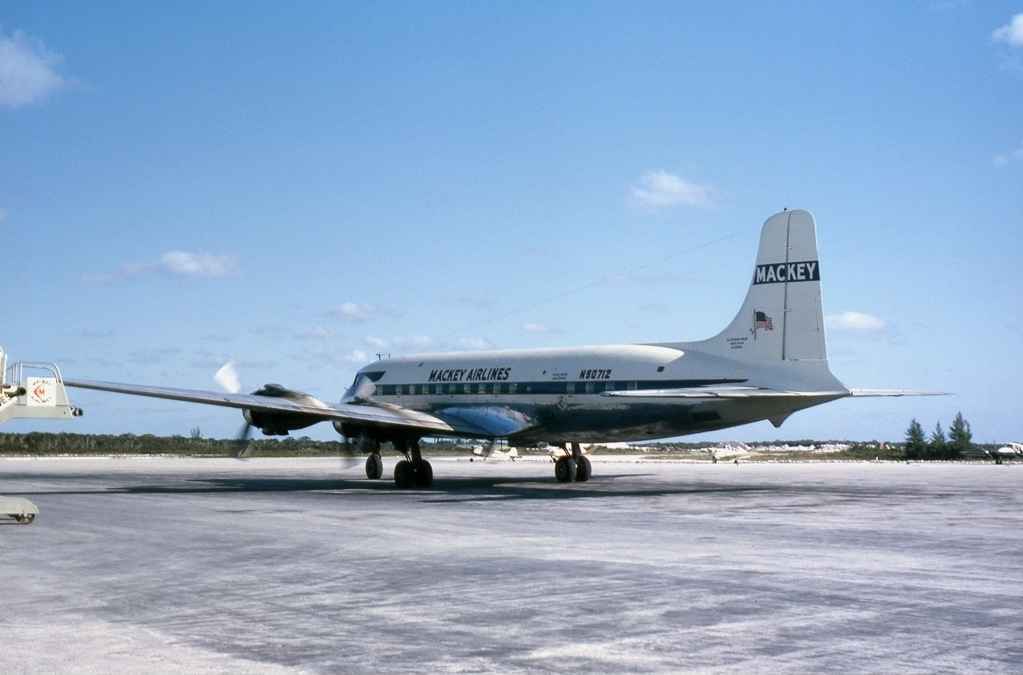
Mackey Airlines DC-6 at West End Airport in 1965

The airport was constructed as part of an ambitious plan to construct a 1000-guest resort at West End in the late 1940s by the British firm Butlin's. The partially-constructed resort operated for a single season in 1950 before Butlin's ran out of money. A small part of the resort was brought back into operation in 1955 before being more fundamentally redeveloped in 1960.

In 1963, the airport was renamed Jack Tar International Airport in connection with the redevelopment of the Butlin's site into Jack Tar Village. West End Airport was the main airport for Grand Bahama until Freeport's overshadowed it.

According to its route map, in 1971 Northeast Airlines was operating scheduled passenger jet service nonstop between Boston (BOS) and the airport.
