= West End, Bahamas =

West End Settlement Point
- Town area of West End
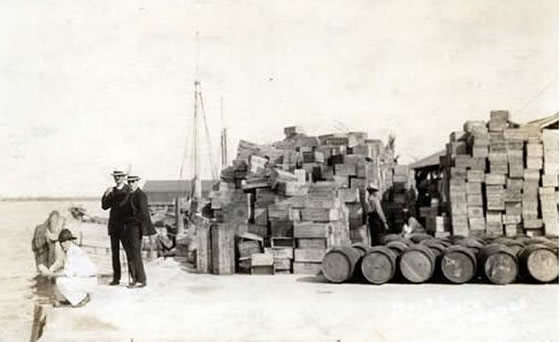
- West End was a popular site during the Prohibition era of the US.

- Location within Bahamas
- Coordinates: 26°41′12″N 78°58′30″W
- Country: Bahamas
- Island: Grand Bahama

Government
  - Chairperson: Jerreth Rolle
- Elevation: 10 m (33 ft)

Population (2012)
  - Total: 13,577
- Time zone: UTC-5 (Eastern Time Zone)
- Area code: 242

West End (also referred to as "Settlement Point") is the oldest town and westernmost settlement on the Bahamian island of Grand Bahama. It is agreed by most academics and lawmakers that West End is the current capital of Grand Bahama, contrary to the popular belief that Freeport is the capital of the island. Yet however, some lawmakers continue to insist that Freeport City is the legitimate capital of Grand Bahama. It is also the third largest settlement in The Bahamas. There is one airport in West End, West End Airport, which serves mostly private aircraft. Since the 1950s, the settlement of West End has fluctuated with the rise and fall of the adjacent resort developments.

== Early history ==
The Bahamas were first inhabited by the Lucayan people in 500-800 AD. It is unknown if the Lucayan people inhabited West End specifically. However, after the arrival of Columbus and Spanish explorers, the Lucayan people became extinct by 1520.

Records from West End show that the population in 1836 was only about 370 people, many of whom later abandoned the island for greater opportunities in Nassau. But in 1861 people flocked back to Grand Bahama because of an unexpected economic opportunity—the American Civil War. At the outbreak of the war, with the Confederate States of America under a strict Union embargo, smugglers operating out of West End were able to command hefty prices from the South for goods such as cotton, sugar, and weapons. As soon as the war ended, the economic boom ended as well, but it established strong ties between the Bahamas and the United States that still exist.

A second smuggling boom came a few decades later when the 18th Amendment prohibited alcohol in the United States. West End achieved notoriety as a rum-running port during this prohibition. Warehouses, distilleries, bars, and supply stores sprang up all over West End. Eventually prohibition ended, the economy contracted and people started fishing again.

Fishing and tourism remain the two major industries of the West End economy.

== Fishing ==
West End is known for its fishing. The location allows sport fishing enthusiasts to easily access shallow or deep-water options within a few nautical miles.

The north side of the island is part of the Bahama Banks and has very shallow water, making it a popular destination for bonefishing. Legendary bonefish guide Israel Rolle, known as "Bonefish Folley", died in July 2012. He guided bonefishing clients like Ernest Hemingway, Martin Luther King Jr., and Richard Nixon. Local fishermen also catch mutton snapper, groupers, spiny lobster and conch. Northwest of West End is Memory Rock. Memory Rock is a large rock that is sticking out of the water in around 7-8 feet of water. Memory Rock is home to great spearfishing and yellowtail snapper fishing. The depth around Memory Rock goes form 2,000 feet to 8 feet in under a mile. This makes for productive wahoo trolling as well. In shallower areas, one can spearfish for mutton snapper, hogfish, spiny lobster (crawfish) and smaller groupers. In these shallow waters, one can sometimes hold conch. Conch is a shellfish that has a generally appreciated taste when prepared correctly. The West End Settlement is known for its conch salad.

Around the tip of West End, the water on the south side of the island drops to a deep trench not far from the shoreline. The Gulf Stream runs through this trench, attracting big game fish to the smaller prey that are carried along. Offshore sport fishermen are drawn to the blue marlin, white marlin, yellow-fin and blue-fin tuna, sailfish, wahoo and dolphin (Mahi Mahi).

== Tourism ==
West End is only 55 nautical miles from the Florida coast and has a long history as a resort destination because of its accessibility. For most boaters entering Bahamian waters from the United States, it is the first port of call. West End is also serviced by the local West End Airport and Grand Bahama International Airport in Freeport.

Tourism and foreign investment have been attracted by the natural beauty of the beaches and water, the warm climate, British rule of law and a stable financial system (the currency is pegged to the US dollar).

=== Jack Tar Village ===
In the late 1940s, the Butlin's firm of the UK built a 1000-guest holiday resort on the then-largely undeveloped island from scratch, including building West End Airport. Butlin's operated the partially-constructed facility for one season (1950) before running out of money. Part of the property was put back into operation in 1955, until it was rebuilt by US interests in 1960 under the Jack Tar brand.

This predates resorts in Freeport and Lucaya. The large 356-room resort had three 9-hole golf courses, 16 tennis courts, a half-million gallon salt water swimming pool (the Bahamas' largest), a huge auditorium for live shows, a shopping arcade, several restaurants, a 100-slip marina and an airport. The airport received charter flights from as far away as the Midwest and, at its peak, several flights from Canada each week.

Jack Tar closed in the early 1990s and was partially demolished thereafter.
