= Andros Town =

Capital of Andros Island, Bahamas

- Town
- Location within Bahamas
- Coordinates: 24°42′17″N 77°47′22″W
- Country: Bahamas
- Island: Andros
- District: North Andros

Population (2010)
  - Total: 386
- Time zone: UTC-5 (Eastern Time Zone)
- Area code: 242

Andros Town is a town in North Andros on Andros in The Bahamas.

The town had a population of 386 in 2010 (greater area).

== Transportation ==
The area is served by Andros Town International Airport, also known as Fresh Creek Airport.

== See also ==
- Districts of the Bahamas
- Islands of the Bahamas
- List of cities in the Bahamas
