= Treasure Cay Airport =

- IATA: TCB; ICAO: MYAT

Summary
- Airport type: Public
- Serves: Treasure Cay, Abaco Islands, Bahamas
- Elevation AMSL: 10 ft / 3 m
- Coordinates: 26°44′43″N 077°23′28″W

Map
- Location in The Bahamas

Runways
Direction	Length		Surface
Direction	m	ft	Surface
14/32	2,134	7,001	Asphalt
- Source: DAFIF

Treasure Cay Airport (IATA: TCB, ICAO: MYAT) is an airport serving Treasure Cay, in the Abaco Islands in The Bahamas.

== Facilities ==
The airport is at an elevation of 8 ft (2.4 m) above mean sea level. It has one runway designated 14/32 with an asphalt surface measuring 2,134 m × 46 m (7,001 ft × 151 ft).

The building has been torn down and they are operating out of a travel trailer. No more than 15 planes arrive/depart a day, most to Florida and some to Nassau.
