= Ocean Cay =

Private resort island and marine reserve in the Bahamas

Ocean Cay - MSC Marine Reserve

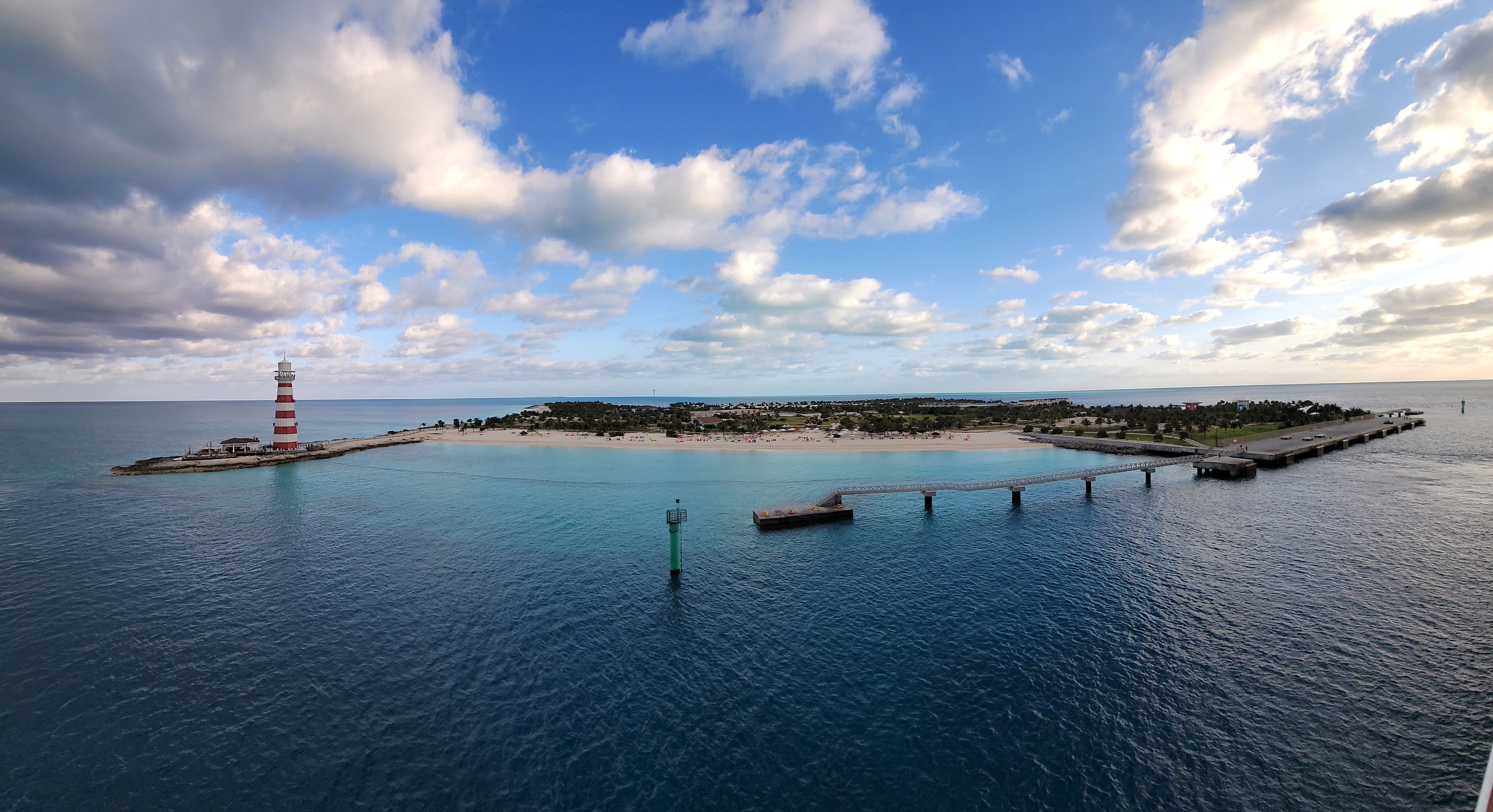
- Overview from the south, Lighthouse Bay in view

- Location in the Bahamas Location in the Caribbean

Geography
- Location: Atlantic Ocean
- Coordinates: 25.4209°N 79.2055°W
- Type: Cay
- Archipelago: Lucayan Archipelago
- Area: 0.42 km^{2} (0.16 sq mi)

Administration
- Bahamas

Additional information
- Time zone: EST (UTC-5)
  - Summer (DST): EDT (UTC-4)
- ISO code: BS-BI

Ocean Cay is an island in the Bahamas located in the district of Bimini. It is located 20 miles (32 kilometers) south of Bimini proper. Ocean Cay is an artificial island which was built by dredging in the late 1960s by Dillingham Construction of Hawaii and was used to mine white oolitic aragonite sand for diverse industrial purposes. The cay has been redeveloped as a private island called Ocean Cay MSC Marine Reserve for MSC Cruises.

== History ==
Ocean Cay is an island that was man-made and created originally for mining aragonite sand. The total size of the island is 42 hectares and the original owners also had dredged the area to allow for deep vessels to dock for the exportation of the sand.

== Restoration ==
When Dillingham Construction abandoned the island, the cay fell into a state of decay. In 2015, the executive chairman of MSC Cruise line, Pierfrancesco Vago, signed a 100-year lease agreement with the Bahamian government to redevelop the island into a new resort for the cruise line. The cruise line planned to spend $200 million on the project.

The restoration would involve removing all of the abandoned mining facilities and infrastructure. A three-part documentary film series entitled Building Paradise Island by director James Redgate documented the cleanup of the island, the conservation leading to marine reserve status, and the building of a new resort from the ground up.

== Beaches ==
The island has eight beaches, including Lighthouse Bay, North Beach, South Beach, Bimini Beach, areas near the lagoon, and a beach reserved for employees. Each beach has at least one lifeguard on duty when the beach is open.

== Gallery ==
Gallery of Ocean Cay
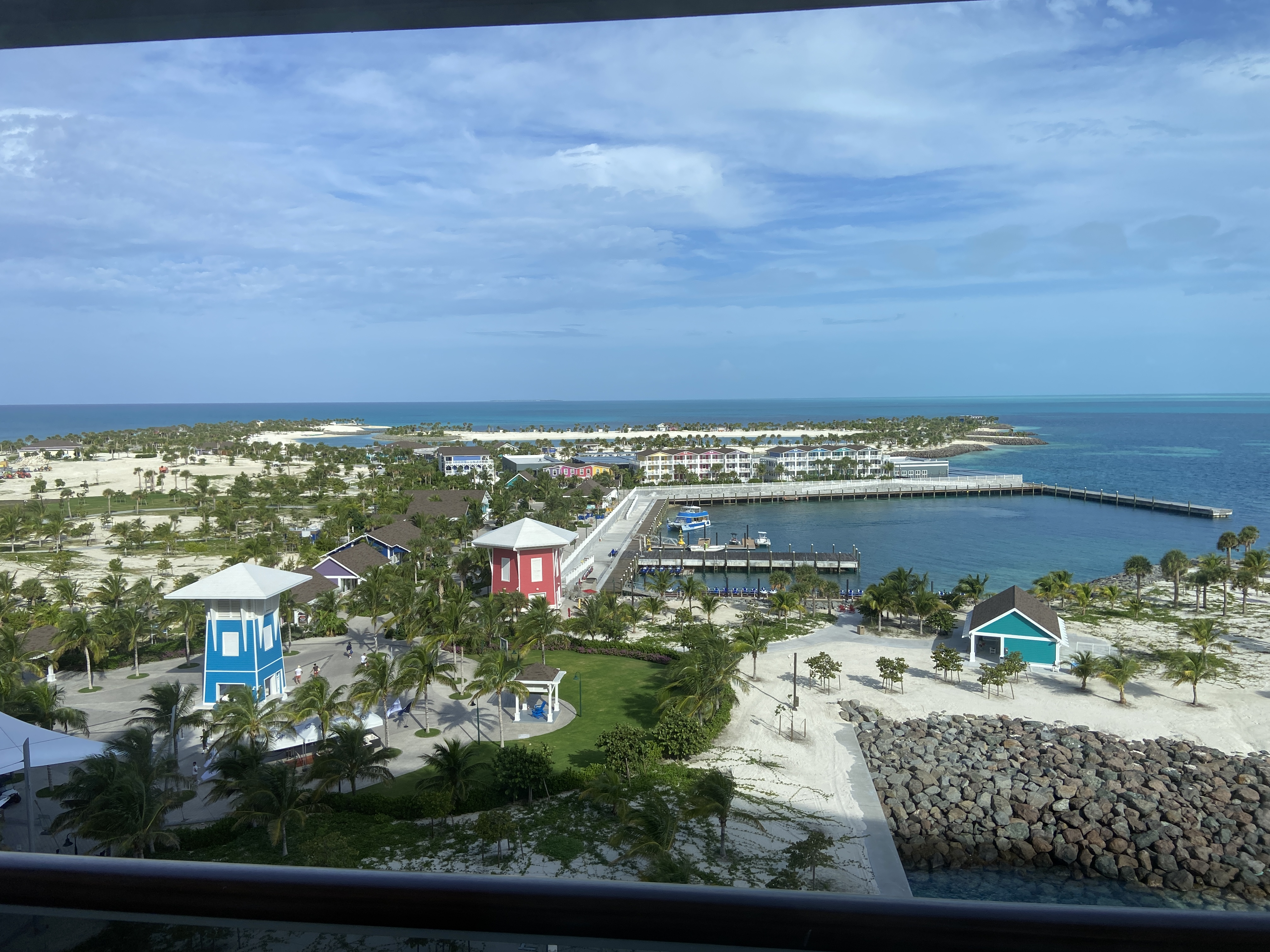
View from a cruise ship overlooking the island with the marina to the right.

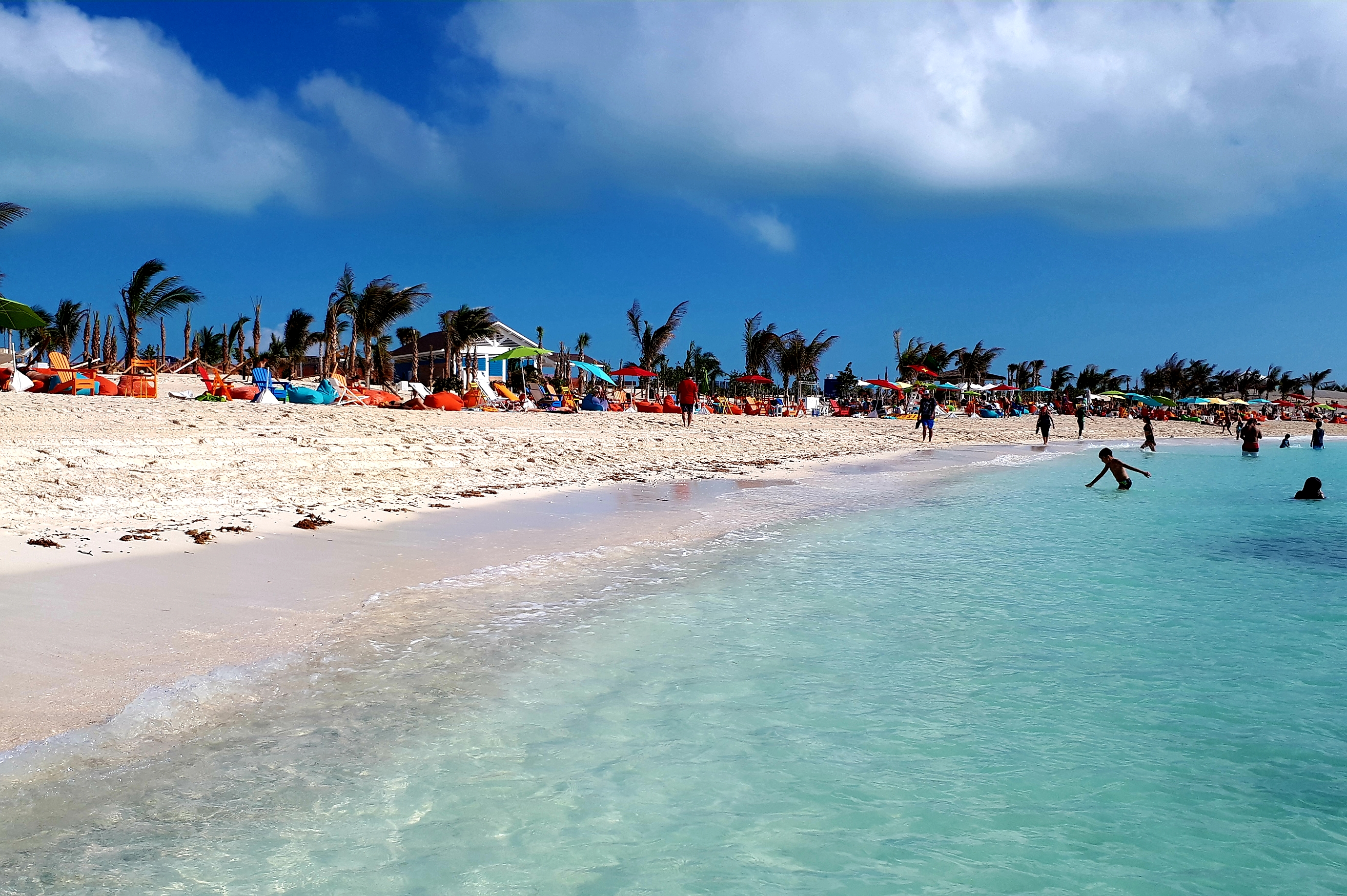
Man-made lagoon in the center of the island.

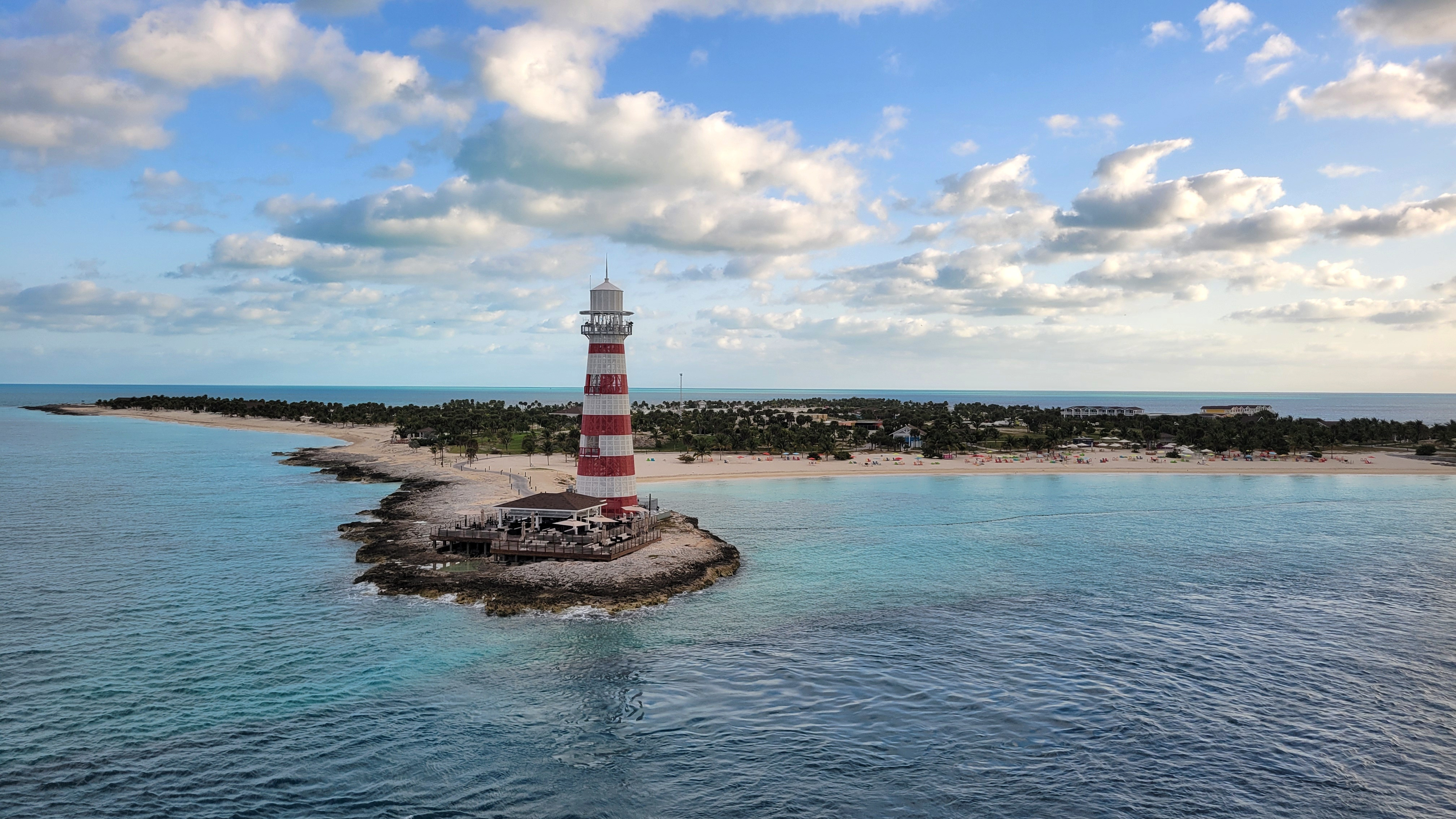
The lighthouse is open to visitors on the island, and LED lights are integrated throughout the structure for visual light shows.

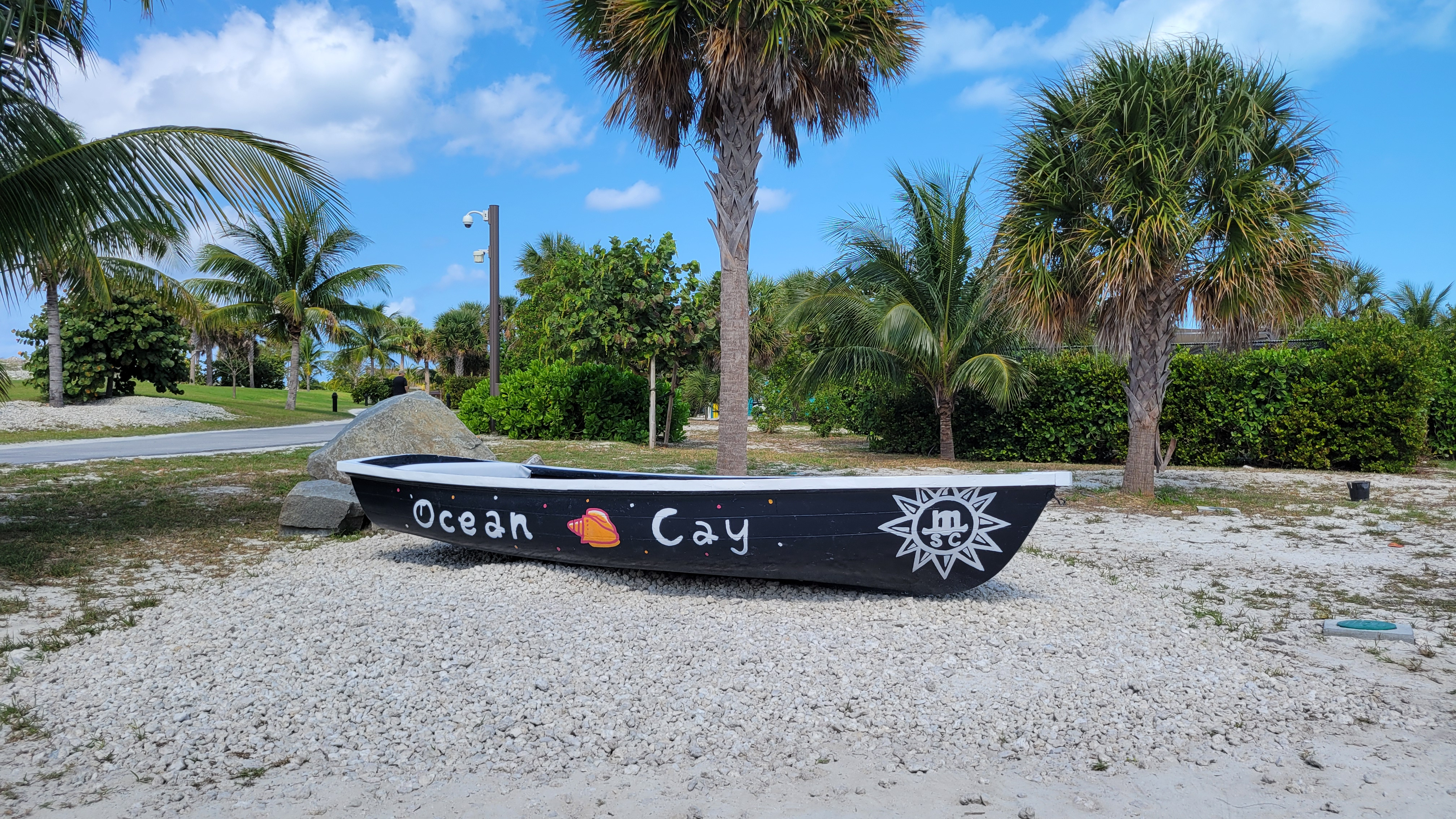
Small decorated wooden boat

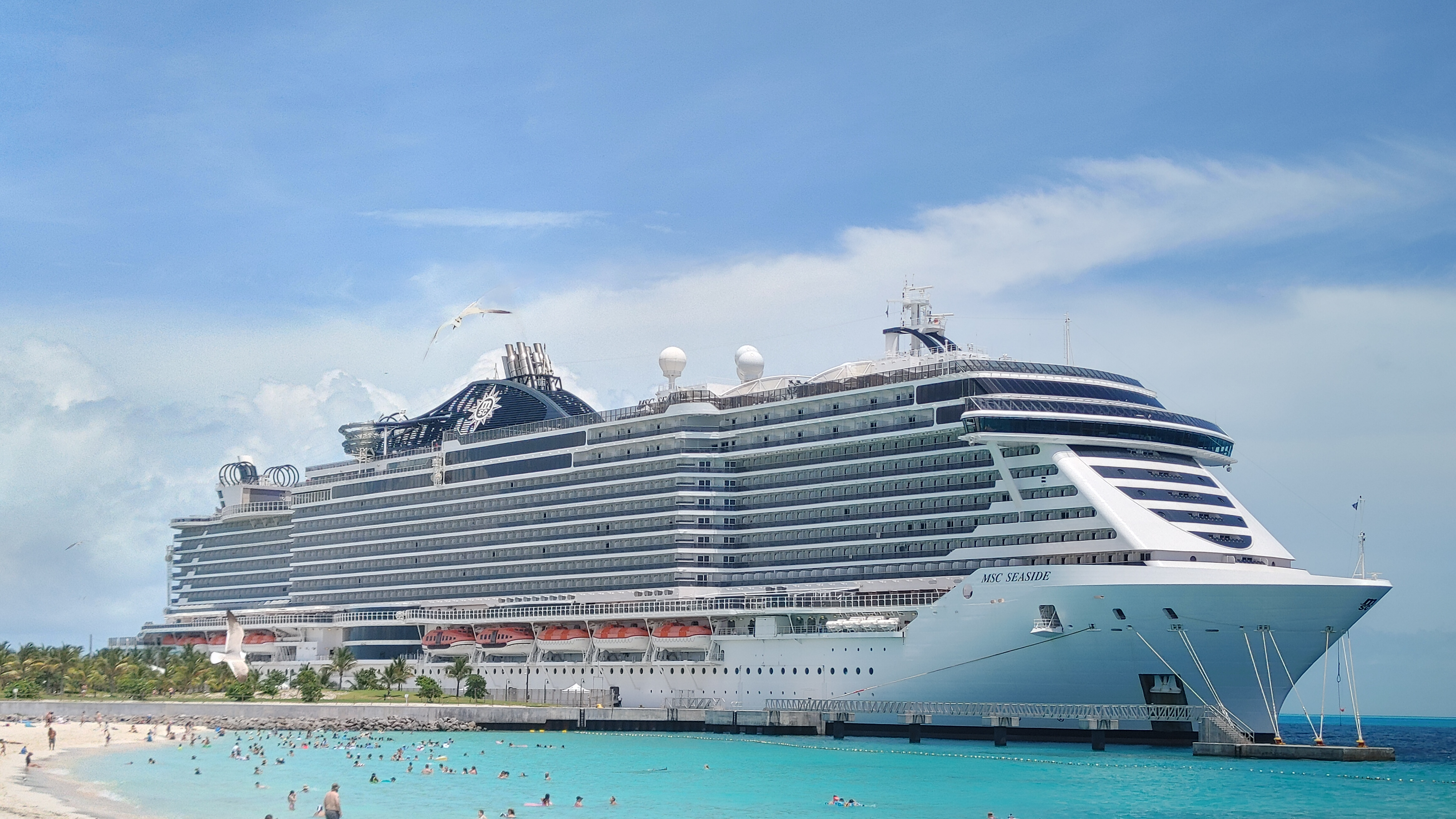
MSC Seaside docked

== See also ==
- CocoCay – a similar small island used by Royal Caribbean Group
- Private island
