= Hurricane Joaquin =

Category 4 Atlantic hurricane in 2015

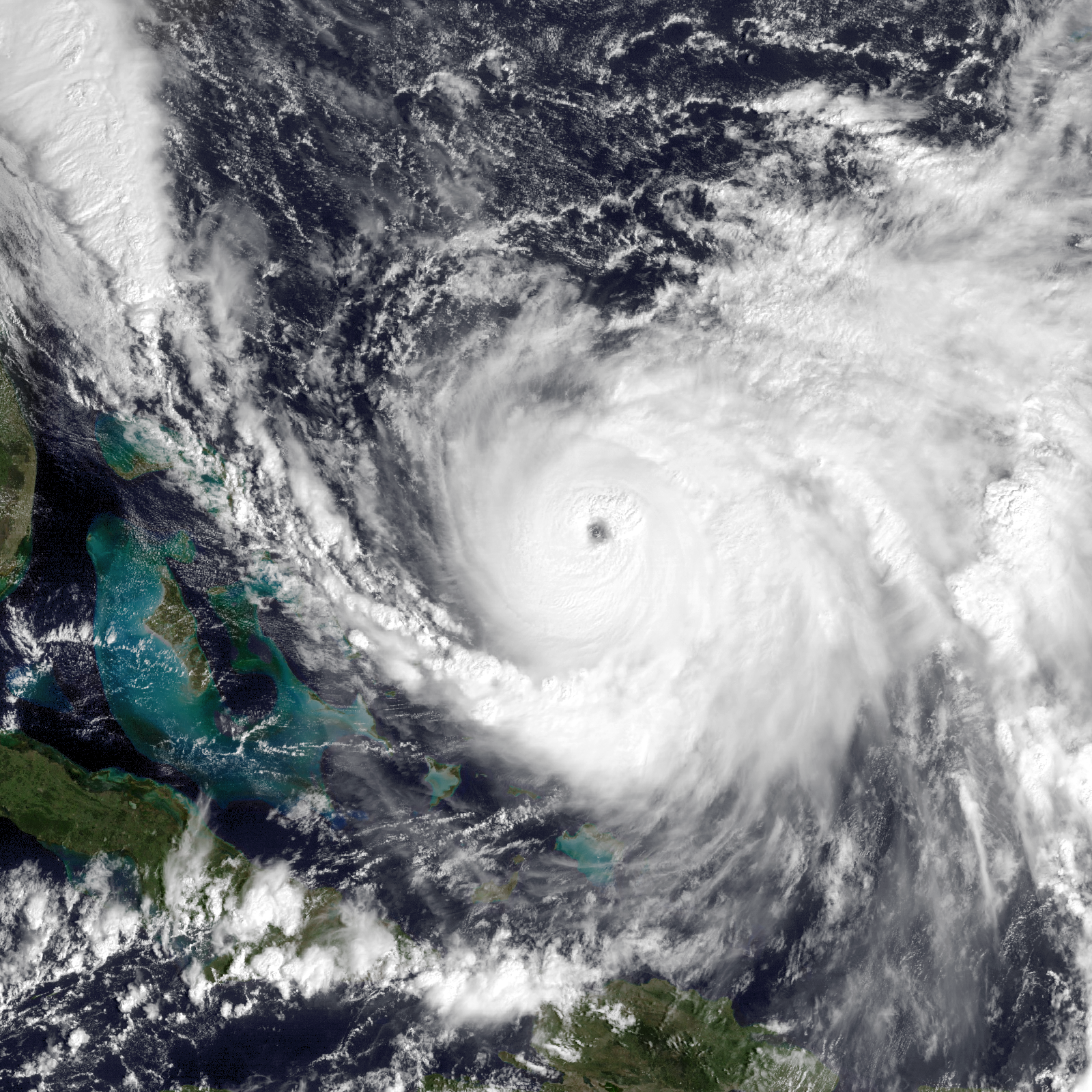
- Hurricane Joaquin at peak intensity northeast of the Bahamas on October 3

Meteorological history
- Formed: September 28, 2015
- Extratropical: October 8, 2015
- Dissipated: October 15, 2015

Category 4 major hurricane
- 1-minute sustained (SSHWS/NWS)
- Highest winds: 155 mph (250 km/h)
- Lowest pressure: 931 mbar (hPa); 27.49 inHg

Overall effects
- Fatalities: 34 direct
- Damage: $120 million (2015 USD) (c. $155 million in 2024)
- Areas affected: Lucayan Archipelago (especially the Bahamas), Cuba, Haiti, Bermuda, Southeastern United States (indirectly)
- IBTrACS
- Part of the 2015 Atlantic hurricane season

Hurricane Joaquin (/hwɑːˈkiːn/ hwah-KEEN; Spanish: Huracán Joaquín [uɾaˈkaŋ xoaˈkin]) was a powerful tropical cyclone that devastated several districts of the Bahamas in early October 2015. It was the strongest Atlantic hurricane of non-tropical origin recorded in the satellite era. The tenth named storm, third hurricane, and second major hurricane of the 2015 Atlantic hurricane season, Joaquin evolved from a non-tropical low to a tropical depression on September 28, southwest of Bermuda. The depression drifted towards the southwest and became a tropical storm the next day. Joaquin then underwent rapid intensification, becoming a Category 4 major hurricane on the Saffir–Simpson scale on October 1. Meandering among the southern Bahamas, Joaquin's eye passed near or over several islands. On October 3, the hurricane weakened somewhat and began moving northeastwards. Abrupt re-intensification ensued later that day, and Joaquin acquired sustained winds of 155 mph (250 km/h), just below Category 5 strength.

Joaquin was one of the strongest hurricanes to affect the Bahamas on record. Hurricane warnings were issued for most of the Bahamas before Joaquin reached the country's southern islands. Between October 1 and 3, Joaquin caused extensive damage on Acklins, Crooked Island, Long Island, Rum Cay, and San Salvador Island. Severe storm surge inundated many communities, trapping hundreds of people in their homes; flooding persisted for days after the hurricane's departure. Prolonged, intense winds brought down trees and power lines, and unroofed homes. Relief efforts in the wake of Joaquin were hampered by heavy damage to airstrips and flooded roads. Offshore, the American cargo ship El Faro and her 33 crew members were lost to the hurricane.

Coastal flooding affected the nearby Turks and Caicos Islands, washing out roadways, compromising seawalls, and damaging homes. Strong winds and heavy rainfall caused some property damage in eastern Cuba. In Haiti, storm tides resulted in severe flooding in several departments, forcing families from their homes and destroying crops, while large waves killed a fisherman at sea. Over the Southeastern United States, a separate storm system drew tremendous moisture from the hurricane, leading to catastrophic flooding in South Carolina. A weakened Joaquin passed just west of Bermuda on October 4, bringing strong winds that caused power outages but only minor damage. Afterwards, the hurricane accelerated eastwards into colder waters, weakening further and becoming extratropical on October 8. Its remnants reached Portugal before dissipating a week later. Across its lifetime, Joaquin killed 34 people and caused US$120 million in damage.

== Meteorological history ==
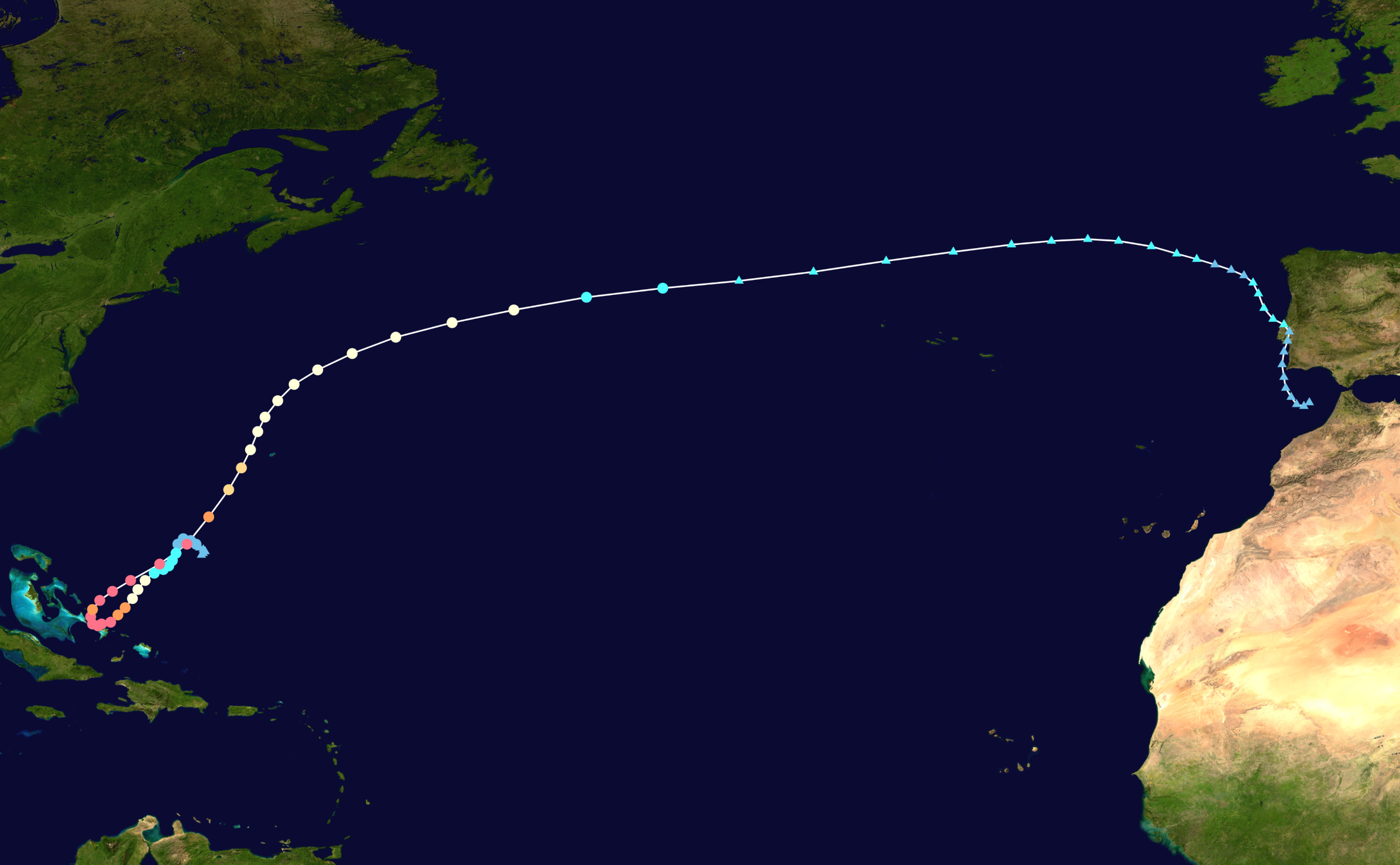
Map plotting the storm's track and intensity, according to the Saffir–Simpson scale Map key Saffir–Simpson scale Tropical depression (≤38 mph, ≤62 km/h) Tropical storm (39–73 mph, 63–118 km/h) Category 1 (74–95 mph, 119–153 km/h) Category 2 (96–110 mph, 154–177 km/h) Category 3 (111–129 mph, 178–208 km/h) Category 4 (130–156 mph, 209–251 km/h) Category 5 (≥157 mph, ≥252 km/h) Unknown Storm type Tropical cyclone Subtropical cyclone Extratropical cyclone, remnant low, tropical disturbance, or monsoon depression

On September 25, 2015, the U.S. National Hurricane Center (NHC) began monitoring an upper-level low, accompanied by a surface trough, several hundred miles south-southwest of Bermuda, for possible tropical cyclogenesis. The system gradually consolidated as it drifted north-northwest, acquiring a closed surface low late on September 26. Convective showers and thunderstorms steadily increased on September 27, and at 00:00 UTC on September 28 the NHC assessed the system to have become a tropical depression, situated roughly 400 mi (640 km) southwest of Bermuda. Although the depression featured a well-defined low, strong wind shear displaced convection and exposed the circulation. A ridge to the north was forecast to steer the system slowly northwest into a region of higher shear; meteorologists at the NHC initially depicted the system dissipating within 96 hours based on computer model simulations. Convection developed and persisted closer to the circulation center throughout September 28, and early on September 29, Dvorak satellite classifications indicated the system became a tropical storm. Accordingly, it was assigned the name Joaquin, becoming the tenth named storm of the 2015 Atlantic hurricane season.

Strengthening of the mid-level ridge prompted a sudden shift in Joaquin's trajectory to the southwest, directing it towards the Bahamas. Forecasters at the NHC noted considerable uncertainty in the future of Joaquin, as forecast models depicted a wide range of possibilities for both track and intensity. Throughout September 29, the storm steadily intensified as its circulation became embedded within deep convection and upper-level outflow became increasingly prominent. High sea surface temperatures—around 1.1 °C (2.0 °F) above normal—and decreasing shear aided strengthening, and early on September 30, the storm achieved hurricane status. Rapid intensification ensued thereafter as an eye developed within a symmetric central dense overcast. Data from aircraft reconnaissance indicated that Joaquin reached Category 3 status on the Saffir–Simpson scale by 00:00 UTC on October 1, thereby becoming the second major hurricane of the season. Around 12:00 UTC, Joaquin passed over Samana Cay in the Bahamas with maximum sustained winds of 130 mph (215 km/h), making it a Category 4 hurricane. During this intensification phase, its eye contracted from 41 to 27 mi (66 to 43 km) in diameter. The storm's central pressure bottomed out at 931 mbar (hPa; 27.49 inHg) around 00:00 UTC on October 2, and the winds rose further to 140 mph (220 km/h).

As the ridge previously steering Joaquin southwest began retreating north, the hurricane's movement slowed and shifted west, and later north, early on October 2. This took the eyewall of Joaquin over Crooked Island and then Long Island. The slower motion of the hurricane likely caused upwelling of cooler waters beneath it, resulting in weakening despite wind shear remaining low. Reconnaissance aircraft also noted the presence of a double wind maximum, suggesting the onset of an eyewall replacement cycle—a process whereby a second, larger eye develops while the inner eye collapses. Joaquin's eye became increasingly ill-defined in satellite imagery, and the winds decreased to 125 mph (205 km/h). The hurricane made landfalls on Rum Cay and San Salvador Island on October 2 at around 16:00 UTC and 21:00 UTC, respectively; a pressure near 944 mbar (hPa; 27.88 inHg) was observed on the latter. An amplifying trough over the Southeastern United States enhanced southwesterly flow over Joaquin on October 3 and prompted the hurricane to accelerate northeast away from the Bahamas. Throughout the day the storm's eye became increasingly defined and re-intensification ensued. Aircraft reconnaissance found a considerably stronger system that afternoon: flight-level winds reached 166 mph (267 km/h) and the aircraft's stepped frequency microwave radiometer estimated surface winds of up to 159 mph (256 km/h). The NHC assessed that Joaquin became a high-end Category 4 hurricane with winds of 155 mph (250 km/h) by 12:00 UTC, making Joaquin the strongest Atlantic hurricane in the satellite era that did not form from a tropical wave or disturbance (as intense hurricanes typically do). The storm's pressure also fell to a low of 934 mbar (hPa; 27.58 inHg).

GOES imagery of Hurricane Joaquin from September 28 to October 7

Shortly after peaking, the hurricane's overall structure began to deteriorate, signalling a weakening trend. On October 4, the storm curved towards the north-northeast between a large low-pressure system to its west and a mid-level ridge to its east. As deep convection over its core continued to wane, Joaquin passed about 70 mi (110 km) west-northwest of Bermuda near 00:00 UTC on October 5, with winds of 85 mph (140 km/h). The weakening trend paused that day as the storm's satellite presentation improved slightly, marked by brief reappearances of a distinct eye feature; this was thought to be caused by a temporary balance between higher wind shear to the north, lower wind shear to the south, and the vortex's inertial stability. Joaquin gradually turned northeastward around the periphery of the weak ridge, and subsequently accelerated toward the east-northeast as it entered the prevailing westerlies. The system maintained hurricane intensity until 15:00 UTC on October 7, by which point strengthening wind shear and an increasingly colder environment began to take their toll. The cloud pattern became lopsided as colder, drier air infiltrated the circulation, forming the first stages of a frontal structure. With its extratropical transition well underway, Joaquin lost its identity as a tropical cyclone at 00:00 UTC on October 8, roughly 445 mi (715 km) west-northwest of the northwestern Azores. During the next several days, Joaquin's extratropical remnant continued heading eastward across the Atlantic, reaching Portugal on October 12. Joaquin's remnant then slowly moved southward along the coast as it spun down, eventually dissipating over the Gulf of Cádiz on October 15.

== Preparations ==
Tropical cyclone watches and warnings were posted throughout the Bahamas starting early on September 30 (UTC); by October 1, hurricane warnings extended from Grand Bahama Island in the northwest to Mayaguana in the southeast. As the storm moved away, the last advisories were discontinued by the morning of October 3. All schools on Exuma, Cat Island, San Salvador, and Rum Cay closed on the afternoon of October 1. Bahamasair cancelled multiple domestic flights, and most airports throughout the island nation were closed, pending post-storm runway inspections. Several cruise ships scheduled to arrive at New Providence were diverted to other ports on October 2. The nation's National Emergency Management Agency (NEMA) activated its Emergency Operations Center, and advised residents in low-lying parts of Mayaguana to evacuate. As conditions worsened, residents in southern islands of the Bahamas criticized the government for providing inadequate warning, with no emergency preparations taking place on Acklins. NEMA refuted the claim and stated people were given ample warning but many residents refused to evacuate. In some instances, police were called in to forcibly move people to shelters.

In the Turks and Caicos Islands to the southeast of the Bahamas, the storm forced the closure of schools and government offices. Two cruise ships were redirected from Grand Turk Island, and Providenciales International Airport suspended operations for a time. The islands were placed under a tropical storm warning on October 1. On October 2, tropical storm warnings were hoisted along coastal Camagüey, Las Tunas, Holguín, and Guantánamo provinces in Cuba.

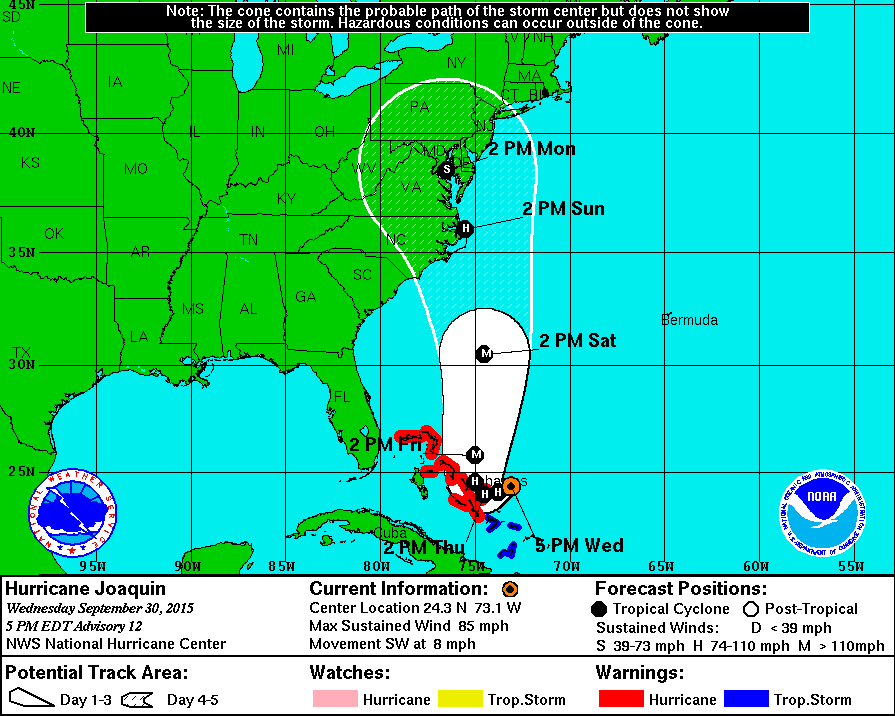
The NHC's five-day forecast track for Joaquin at 5:00 p.m. EDT (21:00 UTC) on September 30, depicting landfall over the United States

From Joaquin's genesis on September 28 until October 1, several weather models indicated Joaquin could make landfall on or closely approach the East Coast of the United States. This threat prompted the governors of Maryland, New Jersey, North Carolina, South Carolina, and Virginia (including the City of Norfolk) to declare states of emergency. A mandatory evacuation order for Ocracoke Island, North Carolina, was placed at 3:00 p.m. EDT (19:00 UTC) on October 1. In New Jersey, the annual Bike MS: City to Shore Ride was canceled for the first time in its 35-year history. Joaquin eventually turned northeastwards and did not directly impact the United States.

On the afternoon of October 2, a tropical storm watch was issued for Bermuda, and a hurricane warning was in effect late on October 3. As a precaution, Royal Bermuda Regiment soldiers were placed on standby, and some emergency equipment was stationed on the east end of the Causeway to prepare for the possibility of the road becoming impassable; officials ultimately closed the Causeway late on October 4, near the height of the storm, and partially reopened it the next morning. By October 3, two cruise ships had canceled their scheduled stops to Bermuda. Most commercial flights to and from the island on October 4 were canceled, and L.F. Wade International Airport suspended all operations that afternoon. Public and private schools were scheduled to close on October 5, though one institution was prepared for use as an emergency shelter. The approaching hurricane halted ferry and bus services.

== Impacts ==
=== Bahamas ===
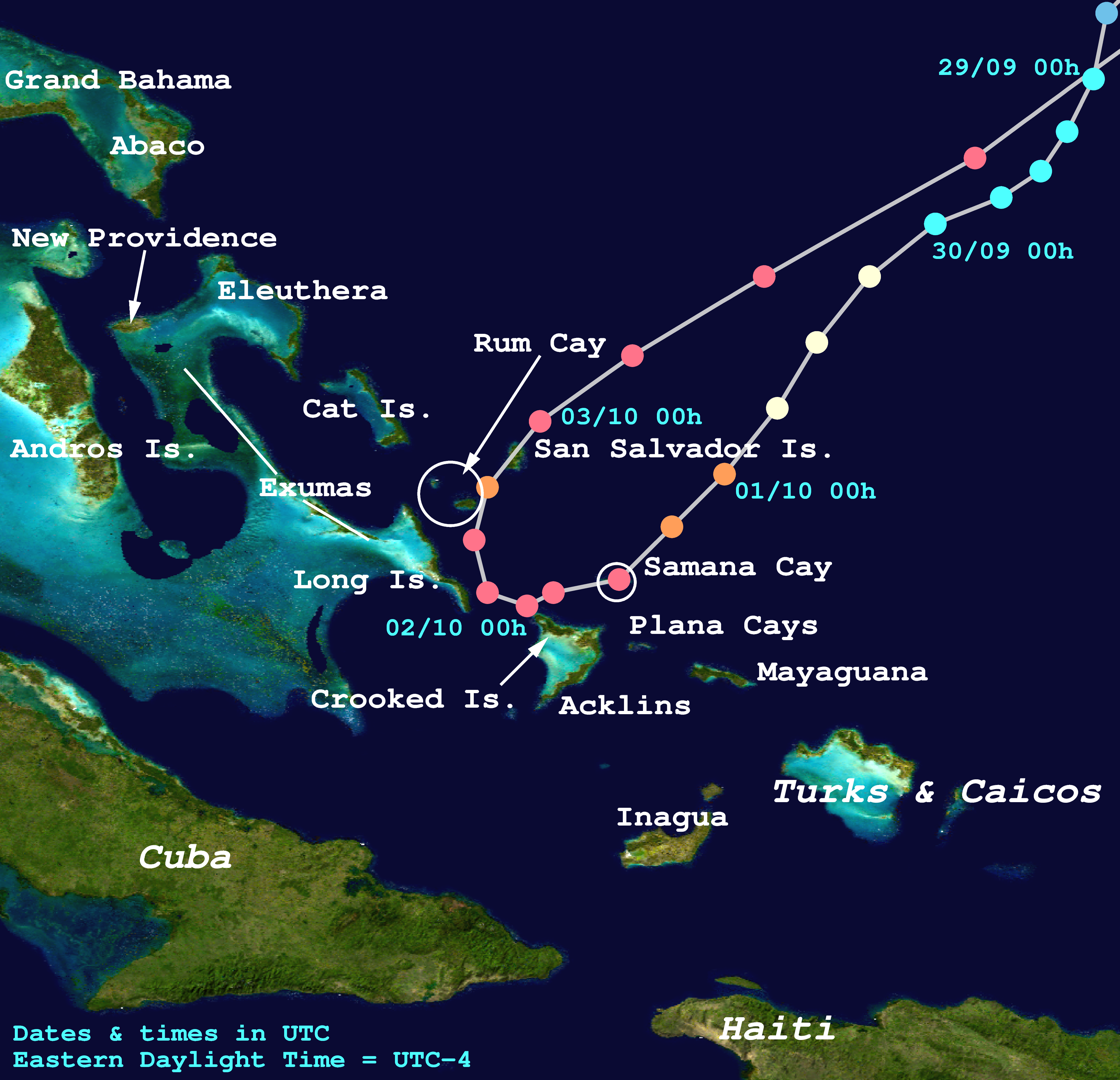
Enlarged and annotated track of Joaquin from September 29 – October 3 depicting its path through the Bahamas

Joaquin was one of the strongest known hurricanes to impact the Bahamas, as well as the strongest October hurricane to affect the country since 1866. Nearly 7,000 people there were directly affected by Joaquin's strong winds, flooding rain, and storm surge. Local newspaper The Tribune compared the effects of Joaquin to the destruction wrought by Hurricane Andrew in 1992, which struck the northwestern Bahamas as a Category 5 hurricane. Initial claims of numerous casualties throughout the island chain proved unsubstantiated, and although one man died during the storm on Long Island, his death was unrelated to the hurricane. Several weeks after the storm, officials estimated that 836 residences had been destroyed, including 413 on Long Island, 227 on San Salvador Island, 123 on Acklins, 50 on Crooked Island, and 23 on Rum Cay. Assessments by the Inter-American Development Bank (IDB) and the United Nations Economic Commission for Latin America and the Caribbean (ECLAC) estimated that Joaquin inflicted about US$120 million in damage across the Bahamian archipelago. Due to low insurance penetration, particularly in the south of the Bahamas, insured losses were pegged by the Bahamas Insurance Association at just US$14 million. About half the overall costs (US$59.8 million) were attributed to infrastructure damage, with housing contributing to another one-third (US$37.4 million).

Widespread power outages affected several islands as the hurricane closed in. Reports of flooding and people in need of assistance were received from Acklins, Crooked Island, Exuma, and Long Island. Power and communication failures plagued the nation's southeastern islands, leaving several islands effectively isolated in the immediate aftermath of Joaquin. The hurricane took all 59 cell sites belonging to the Bahamas Telecommunications Company (BTC) offline. Early aerial surveys revealed that Acklins, Rum Cay, Crooked Island, and San Salvador Island suffered near-total destruction. The Bahamas Department of Meteorology estimated that Joaquin brought 5–10 in (130–250 mm) of rain to the central and southeastern Bahamas. Throughout the archipelago, flooding from the hurricane trapped over 500 residents.

External videos
- U.S. Coast Guard aerial footage of flooding in the Bahamas on October 3, published by the Associated Press

Floodwaters up to 5 ft (1.5 m) deep submerged at least 70% of Crooked Island, where the storm left widespread structural damage. A private weather station on the island measured sustained winds of 114 mph (183 km/h) gusting to 148 mph (239 km/h) before going offline. The hurricane shifted two large fuel tanks belonging to the Bahamas Electricity Corporation off their bases, allowing more than 10,000 gallons of fuel to leak into the ground. Septic tank seepage contaminated residential wells, leaving residents without clean drinking water. The clinic in Colonel Hill had its roof blown off. In the days following the storm, about 100 evacuees—including 46 from Crooked Island—were flown to New Providence, where several of them sought medical attention. Acklins endured severe flooding, with many homes inundated and numerous calls for rescue; the island's sea barrier was breached by 9:00 a.m. local time (13:00 UTC) on October 1. Some residents reported the entire island to be under water. The health center in Spring Point, situated next to the ocean, was badly damaged by flooding and all medical supplies stored there were lost. Power outages caused a water treatment plant to become inoperative, effectively halving Acklins' drinking water production capacity. A bridge in Lovely Bay was completely destroyed. Significant standing water was observed on Crooked Island and Acklins even on October 7. The terminal buildings at both Spring Point Airport on Acklins and Colonel Hill Airport on Crooked Island suffered damage to the roofs, walls, and interiors, while the runways at both airports were obstructed by fallen vegetation.

Long Island was subject to an immense 18 ft (5.5 m) storm surge that flooded homes with up to 12 ft (3.7 m) of water. Southern areas of the island suffered considerable devastation; the surge washed out coastal roadways and drove numerous fishing boats ashore. The district's Member of Parliament, Loretta Butler-Turner, estimated that 75% of all fishing vessels there were destroyed. This, combined with heavy losses to farms and crops, threatened the livelihoods of many residents. About 20 individuals required rescue on Long Island, while some hurricane shelters became compromised by water entrance. Dead animals were seen floating in the water. Strong winds unroofed dozens of homes, and many structures were fully destroyed. The clinic in Clarence Town was destroyed after a neighboring house's roof was blown onto it, resulting in the loss of medical supplies, files, and equipment. Northern parts of the island fared better in comparison. The winds and flooding took a large toll on native vegetation, even well inland.

Enhanced infrared satellite loop of Joaquin passing through the Bahamas on October 2

Powerful winds brought down trees and utility poles on Rum Cay, clogging roadways. A number of homes were damaged or destroyed in the district; two grocery stores also sustained damage. The main dock serving Rum Cay was destroyed. A church housing 32 evacuees became flooded and structurally compromised, forcing the inhabitants to relocate. Joaquin also damaged power lines in Exuma, where "extreme" flooding was reported. There was modest structural damage on Mayaguana, the easternmost island of the Bahamas.

On San Salvador Island, large swells ahead of the storm's arrival in the Bahamas washed out a main road. As Joaquin moved over San Salvador on October 2, the island experienced a storm surge generally between 9–11 ft (2.6–3.4 m), reaching as high as 19 ft (5.7 m) at Grahams Harbor. Joaquin's unusual angle of approach (making landfall from the southwest) and overall slow motion meant that storm surge was more evenly distributed across the island, with the highest surges on the northern coast. The island's main power plant in Cockburn Town lost its roof, resulting in rainwater damaging the generators and spare parts. Water infrastructure remained mostly intact and service was fully restored within five days. Damage to buildings across the island was widespread; roughly 90% of structures were noted to have observable damage during a survey two months after the hurricane. The two major tourist resorts on San Salvador Island were both heavily damaged, while the terminal building at San Salvador Airport was essentially destroyed: about 60% of its ceiling caved in, and the walls, windows, lighting, and overall structure sustained extensive damage. The University of the Bahamas' Gerace Research Centre, where 120–150 residents took shelter from the hurricane, was also badly affected. At least 70% of fishermen residing on the island lost their boats.

=== Sinking of El Faro ===
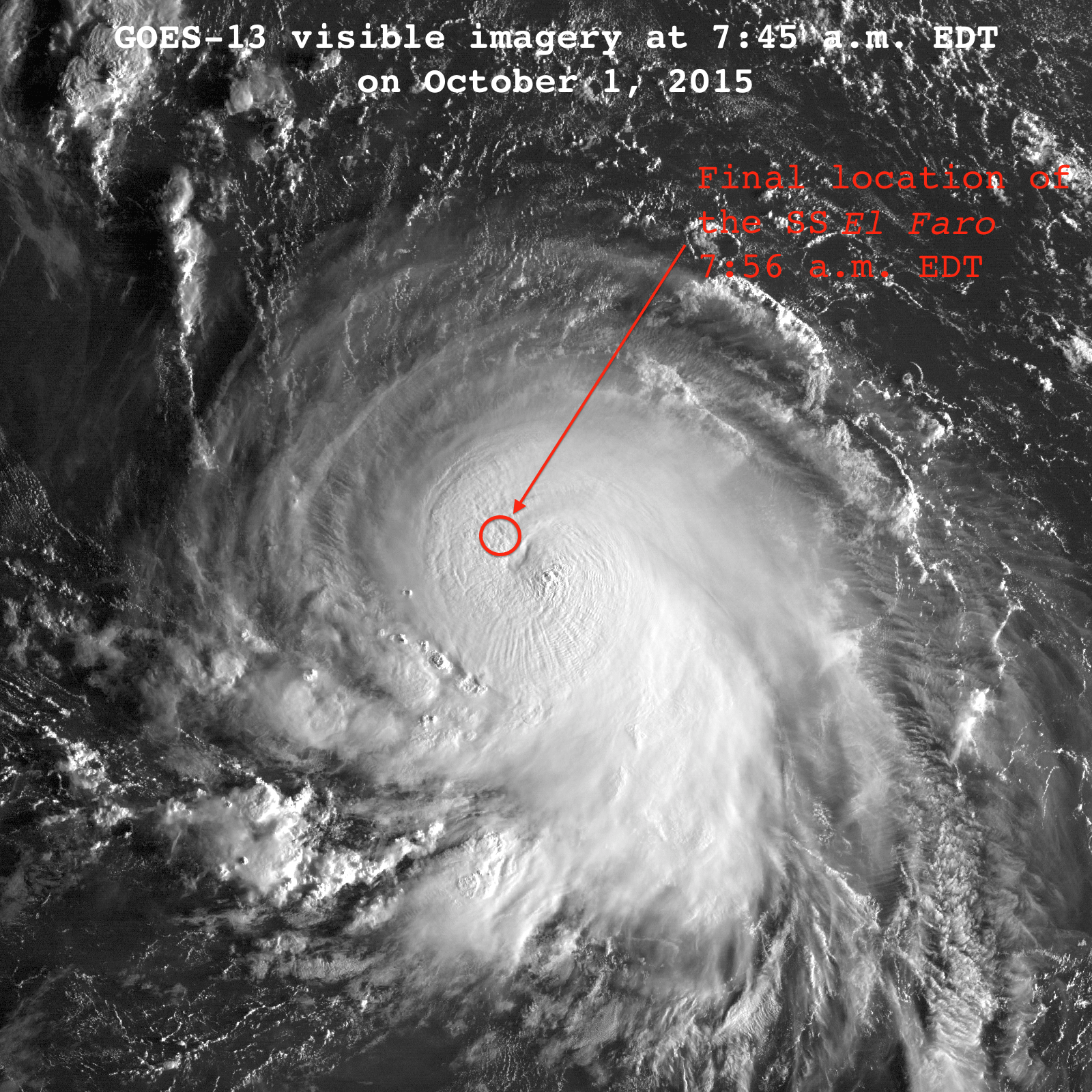
Satellite image at 7:45 a.m. EDT (11:45 UTC) on October 1 depicting the approximate final position of the SS El Faro near Joaquin's west eyewall

An American cargo ship—the 791 ft (241 m) El Faro—went missing near Crooked Island with 33 crew members (28 Americans and 5 Poles) amid 20 to 30 ft (6.1 to 9.1 m) seas near the hurricane's eyewall. The vessel was last reported to have lost propulsion and begun to list around 7:30 a.m. EDT (11:30 UTC) on October 1. Hurricane hunters aircraft investigating the storm flew much lower than normal in an unsuccessful effort to locate the stricken ship. The United States Coast Guard conducted searches during the day of October 2 without success; efforts resumed at dawn on October 3. Two debris fields were discovered: one spanning 345 mi^{2} (890 km^{2}) near the El Faro's last known position, and the other covering 81 mi^{2} (210 km^{2}) about 69 mi (111 km) to the north; among the debris were a partially submerged life raft, personal flotation devices, cargo containers, Styrofoam, packaged food, and an oil sheen. One body, presumed to be from El Faro, was spotted late on October 4 but could not be recovered. The joint mission conducted by the Coast Guard, Air Force, Navy, Air National Guard, and commercial tugboats covered more than 242,000 mi^{2} (630,000 km^{2}) in search of the vessel and its crew. The Coast Guard called off search operations at sunset on October 7, with the ship and her crew presumed lost.

A Navy salvage team was requested, at the behest of the National Transportation Safety Board (NTSB), to search for the wreckage. USNS Apache resumed the search on October 23, and using side-scan sonar found the wreckage of a cargo ship at a depth of 15,000 ft (4,600 m) on October 31. This was confirmed to be the El Faro the next day using a deep-ocean remotely-operated vehicle. The voyage data recorder was only found and retrieved nine months later, on August 9, 2016. The Coast Guard's overall report on the incident, released on October 1, 2017, placed the blame mostly on the ship's captain for underestimating the weather conditions, overestimating the ship's capabilities, and not reacting sufficiently as the weather worsened. The NTSB's investigation, which concluded on December 12, 2017, also criticized the captain for failing to listen to other crew members warning him about the intensifying storm, but highlighted that the El Faro had not been kept up to date with modern safety regulations, such as its use of open lifeboats instead of enclosed ones.

=== Remainder of the West Indies ===
In the Turks and Caicos Islands, heavy rains and storm surge from Joaquin compromised infrastructure, including roadways, docks, and bulkheads. The seawall along Front Street on Grand Turk Island was damaged, prompting officials to close part of the road. Multiple homes along the coast faced flooding and leaking roofs. In several areas, pounding surf brought about coastal erosion and deposited large volumes of seaweed. Two ships sank at the ferry terminal on Providenciales, while the island's airport remained closed for two days so its storm-damaged weather station could be replaced. The territory also lost fruit and vegetable crops to the storm, especially at the government farm on North Caicos.

Though the storm's center remained north of the Greater Antilles, some coastal areas experienced rough winds and high seas. In Cuba, the station at Guantánamo Bay recorded gusts of 55 mph (89 km/h). The storm caused coastal flooding and damage to roofs in Granma Province, affecting more than 100 homes; a provincial high rainfall total of 6.2 in (157 mm) was observed at Niquero. In coastal Baracoa, fifty homes were damaged. Rain from the storm somewhat alleviated conditions from a record drought in Granma, Guantánamo, and Santiago de Cuba provinces, though 11 reservoirs remained below 30% capacity in Santiago de Cuba.

Along the northern coast of Haiti's Tiburon Peninsula, high waves from the hurricane capsized a boat occupied by two fishermen, killing one of them. Many communes experienced significant coastal flooding from storm tides and active seas, which drove water up to half a kilometer (0.3 mi) inland. More than 100 homes in Artibonite were inundated, and the main road to Anse-Rouge was impassable. Strong winds brought down multiple trees in the commune of Grand-Saline, where severe flooding was also reported. In Nippes and Nord-Ouest, four emergency shelters housed nearly 300 individuals. Joaquin damaged banana and millet fields, killed a small number of livestock, and triggered several landslides. In the four hardest-hit departments, about 900 households were directly affected by the storm. The Haitian government distributed nearly 500 hygiene kits to 200 families in Nippes, while evacuees in Port-de-Paix received mattresses, bed sheets, hygiene kits, food kits, and clean water; Action Against Hunger also donated water purification tablets.

North of Haiti, the 212 ft (65 m) cargo vessel Minouche began to sink in heavy weather. The U.S. Coast Guard safely rescued all 12 crew members from a life-raft late on October 1.

=== Bermuda ===
Enhanced infrared satellite loop, showing Joaquin making its closest approach to Bermuda early on October 5

As conditions worsened throughout October 4, roadways on Bermuda became obstructed by debris and floodwaters, and electric crews combated growing power outages. By the next morning, the hurricane had cut power to over 15,000 customers. Service was returned to the vast majority of households by October 8, despite further inclement weather briefly impeding restoration work. Sustained winds of 56 mph (91 km/h) gusting to 72 mph (117 km/h) were recorded at L.F. Wade International Airport; at higher elevations elsewhere, gusts reached as high as 102 mph (165 km/h). The historic Commissioner's House at the Bermuda Maritime Museum lost the last of its original roof, which had been heavily damaged by hurricanes Fay and Gonzalo in October 2014; the interior of the building consequently suffered some water damage. In general, however, property damage across the island was minor. The airport reopened by midday on October 5, with damage mostly limited to a toppled section of perimeter fence.

=== United States ===
Although Joaquin ultimately tracked far to the east of the United States, a non-tropical low over the Southeast drew moisture from the hurricane through an atmospheric river, producing record-breaking rains and flooding across North and South Carolina from October 1–5. Several areas in South Carolina saw accumulations exceeding the threshold for a 1-in-1,000-year event; the Lowcountry to the Midlands experienced over 15 in (380 mm) of rain, with a peak total of 26.88 in (683 mm) near Mount Pleasant. The subsequent floods inundated large areas of the state, with areas around Charleston and Columbia hardest-hit. This storm caused US$2 billion in damage and killed 25 people.

== Aftermath ==
=== Bahamas ===
In the immediate aftermath of Joaquin, damage to airports and floodwaters obstructing roads meant initial relief efforts were slow, and storm victims relied on helicopters, seaplanes, and watercraft to deliver supplies. Workers gradually cleared runways for emergency use in the days following the storm, and all airports were open for normal operations by October 9. By October 4, the Government of Jamaica and the United States Agency for International Development had donated 50 tonnes and just over 32 tonnes, respectively, of emergency supplies to the Bahamas. Private groups, local businesses, and non-governmental organizations, such as the Bahamas Red Cross, started donation drives and began distributing goods to storm victims. NEMA received donations of US$1 million from the Utilities Regulation and Competition Authority in conjunction with BTC, and US$50,000 from the Progressive Liberal Party; further private sector donations totaled just over US$600,000. The Caribbean Disaster Emergency Management Agency arranged for three response teams to evaluate the situation on Acklins, Crooked Island and Long Island. BTC established communication centers on Ragged Island, Inagua, and Long Island, giving affected citizens the opportunity to contact family members for free. BTC also repaired and returned most of their cell sites to service within two weeks. By October 21, the Bahamas Electricity Corporation had remedied about 80% of its power outages, aided by crews from New Providence and the Caribbean Association of Electric Utilities group.

A special committee was formed to oversee reconstruction efforts, while government officials began considering new laws to enact stricter building codes. The government pledged to help eligible homeowners rebuild and repair their property. On October 6, Prime Minister of the Bahamas Perry Christie signed an order waiving import duties on materials needed for rebuilding by storm victims and registered charities on 12 islands. Local leaders called for an extension of the three-month exemption period, which many saw as inadequate. In what residents feared to be a major economic setback, storm-related damage forced Club Med to delay the annual opening of its San Salvador resort—the largest employer on the island—by two months; the resort eventually reopened by January 2016. At the end of October, NEMA began to shift its focus from emergency relief distribution to permanent rebuilding efforts. Economists at the IDB assessed that the effects of Joaquin caused the Bahamian monthly gross domestic product to decrease by 2.8%. The Ministry of Finance estimated in October 2016 that the cost of rebuilding after Joaquin would be around US$200 million.

Joaquin was the first of four major hurricanes to affect the Bahamas in four years: Hurricane Matthew struck the following year, Hurricane Irma in 2017, and Hurricane Dorian in 2019. The four hurricanes resulted in a combined US$4.2 billion in losses across the country.

=== Retirement ===
Because of the severe damage in the Bahamas and the deaths at sea caused by the storm, the name Joaquin was retired by the World Meteorological Organization in April 2016. The name was replaced with Julian for the 2021 season.

== See also ==
- Hurricanes in the Lucayan Archipelago
- List of Bermuda hurricanes
- List of Category 4 Atlantic hurricanes
- Hurricane Frances (2004) – Before Joaquin, the most recent Category 4 hurricane to strike the Bahamas
- Hurricane Irene (2011) – Struck the southeastern Bahamas as a Category 3 hurricane
