= Spring Point =

Spring Point can refer to:

- Spring Point Township, Cumberland County, Illinois, United States
- Spring Point, Antarctica
- Spring Point, Bahamas, the largest community on the island of Acklins
  - Spring Point Airport
- Spring Point, a community in the Municipal District of Willow Creek No. 26, Alberta, Canada
