= San Salvador Island =

San Salvador Island Guanahaní Watling's Island
- Island and District
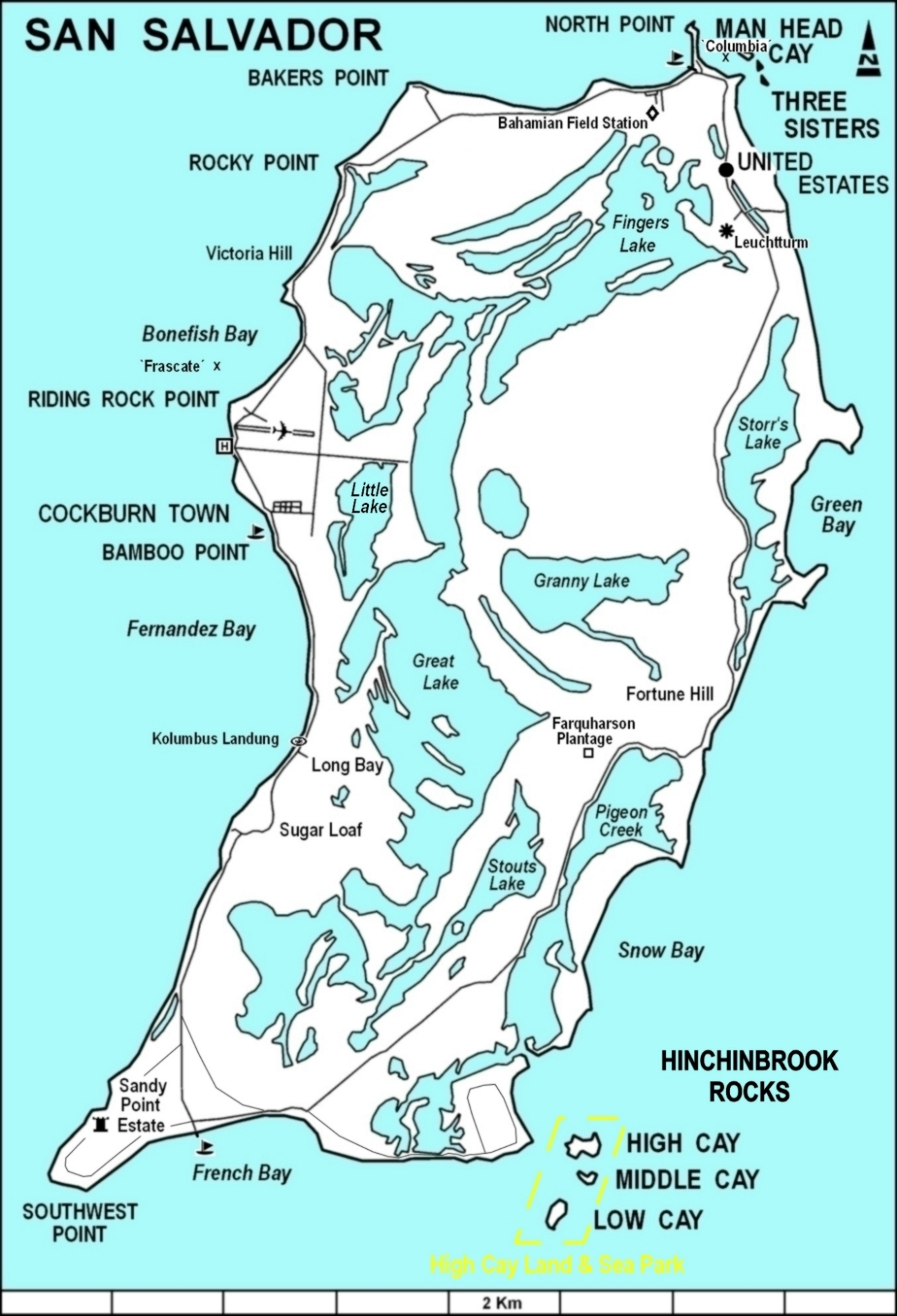
- A map of San Salvador Island

- Location within Bahamas
- Coordinates: 24°2′6″N 74°29′51″W
- Country: Bahamas
- Island: San Salvador
- District: San Salvador

Area
  - Total: 163 km^{2} (63 sq mi)

Population (2022)
  - Total: 824
  - Density: 5.06/km^{2} (13.1/sq mi)
- Time zone: UTC−5 (Eastern Time Zone)
- Area code: 242

San Salvador Island, previously Watling's Island, is an island and district of the Bahamas, famed for being the probable location of Christopher Columbus's first landing of the Americas on 12 October 1492 during his first voyage. This historical importance, the island's tropical beaches, and its proximity to the United States have made tourism central to the local economy. The island has a population of 824 (2022) and is under the administration of Gilbert C. Kemp. Its largest settlement and seat of local government is Cockburn Town.

== Names ==
Watling's Island was named after George or John Watling, an Englishman who settled it in the 17th century. The name was used officially from the 1680s until 1926. It is still used unofficially in discussions of the actual location of Columbus's first landfall.

San Salvador derives from the Spanish Isla San Salvador ("Island of the Holy Savior"), bestowed by Christopher Columbus in honor of Jesus Christ in thanks for his fleet's safe arrival in what he thought was East Asia. Columbus recorded the natives' name for the place as Guanaham, now considered to be a mistranscription of Lucayan Guanahaní, meaning "Small Land in the Upper Waters".

In 1926, an Act of Parliament was passed to rename the island that had previously been called San Salvador to Cat Island and to rename Watling Island, as it was then, San Salvador).

== Geography ==
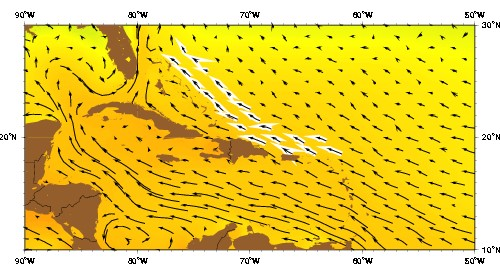
The Antilles Current

San Salvador Island sits on its own isolated carbonate platform surrounded by a narrow shelf that reaches a depth of up to 40 metres (130 ft). Past the shelf, the slope becomes almost vertical and depth quickly increases to 4,000 metres (13,000 ft). San Salvador Island experiences a semidiurnal tide, with two high tides and two low tides per day. Water temperature in San Salvador can range from 23 to 29 °C (73 to 84 °F) depending on the location and time of year. Salinity and dissolved oxygen are consistent throughout the island and throughout the year (35 ppt and 6.0% respectively).

Most of San Salvador Island is surrounded by fringing reefs. In many areas, such as Fernandez Bay, the shore is rocky and populated by reef urchins (Echinometra viridis). Moving away from shore, the bottom slopes gradually and may have several patch reefs surrounded by a sandy bottom. These patch reefs are home to hundreds of fish, invertebrates, and algae. The depth continues to increase to about 25 metres (82 ft) at the farthest edge of the shelf, which can be 400 to 1,500 metres (1,300 to 4,900 ft) from shore.

Wind and wave action in San Salvador is influenced by the Antilles Current. The Antilles Current originates south of the Bahamas, Puerto Rico, and Cuba and moves northward where it merges with the Gulf Stream. This current cools the waters around San Salvador in the summer and warms the water around the island in the winter. This keeps the water temperature relatively mild and consistent throughout the year.

The coasts of San Salvador are very different from each other. The west coast of San Salvador faces the rest of the Bahamas and the Great Bahama Bank. Most of these islands are sheltered from significant winds and wave action, making the water generally calmer with greater visibility. In contrast, the eastern coast of San Salvador is windward and completely exposed to the rest of the Atlantic Ocean and is not protected by any other geological formations.

As a result, wave action is much stronger and visibility is lower. Evidence of currents from the Atlantic Ocean can be found on the east coast in the form of flotsam and debris on the beaches. During Hurricane Joaquin in October 2015, the cargo steamer El Faro sank approximately 80 km (50 mi) east of San Salvador. Several weeks later, pieces of the containers that had been swept away by the current were reported on the beaches of San Salvador.

== History ==
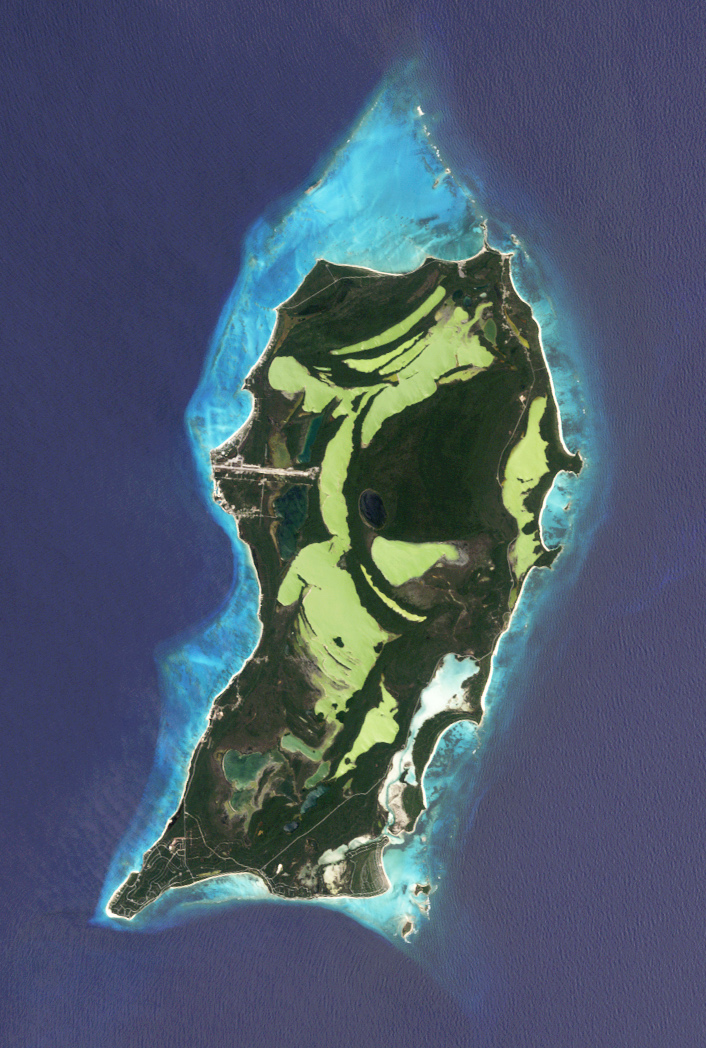
San Salvador from space (2007)

=== Columbus's arrival ===
Christopher Columbus's voyages west were sponsored by Spain in the hopes that he would reach China and the East Indies, circumventing both Turkish and Portuguese control of the eastern and southern routes of the lucrative spice trade. Letters from Columbus to the Spanish monarchs Isabella I of Castile and Ferdinand II of Aragon record that the first island sighted during his first voyage was known to its Lucayan inhabitants as Guanahaní and that he renamed it San Salvador in thanks to God.

Arriving on 12 October 1492, he described the Lucayans as "sweet and gentle", "naked as they were born", possessed of "neither iron, nor steel, nor arms, nor... competent to use them", "timid to a surprising degree", and—combined with the other islands he visited—would enable to him to deliver to Spain "slaves, as many of these idolators as their Highnesses shall command to be shipped". Earlier in the same letter, Columbus had explained that the Lucayans were not idolators but, as chattel slavery had largely disappeared from Europe during the High Middle Ages and Early Renaissance, its revival under Nicholas V's 1452 Dum Diversas... and similar bulls were dependent on the idolatrous status of the enslaved.

Columbus himself seized several Guanahamians by force to use as translators and ambassadors, despite forcing his crew to stop cheating them in exchanges of random trash for items of great worth, including one who received 12 g of gold for a used leather strap. Despite their general intelligence, the Guanahamian slaves considered him sent from the heavens and secured him welcome at every island he visited.

The location of this first island visited by Columbus is disputed. In the 19th century, it was usually thought to be Cat Island but arguments from Juan Bautista Muñoz; Captain Alexander B. Becher, a hydrographer in the Royal Navy; Rear Adm. Joseph B. Murdock of the U.S. Navy; Richard Henry Major, map custodian of the British Museum; the geographer Clements Markham; the naval historian Samuel E. Morison; and the Benedictine priest Chrysostom Schreiner eventually led to the island's 1926 renaming. Fr. Schreiner relocated to San Salvador, where his tomb is still preserved. More recently, the National Geographic Society, Keith Pickering, and others have argued for alternative locations, including Samana Cay.

=== Later history ===
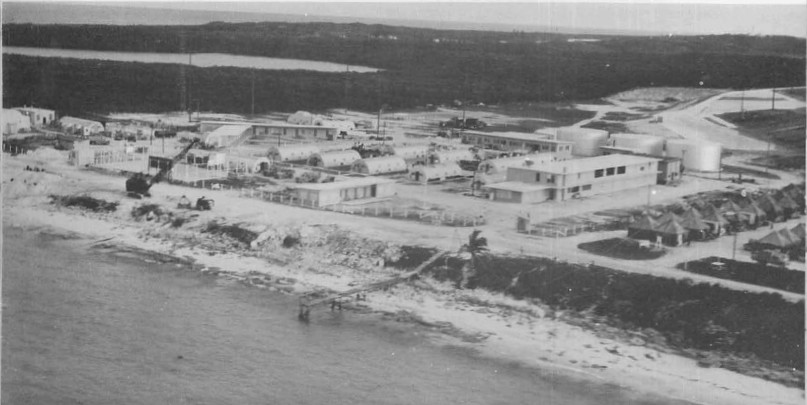
The USCG LORAN Station San Salvador under construction in the late 1950s

The island now called San Salvador was settled in the 17th century by the English buccaneer George or John Watling. Britain formally colonised the Bahamas in the early 18th century.

Watling Island's name would later be officially changed to San Salvador in 1925 in order to recognize Columbus' first landing, with this name change going into effect on 6 May 1926.

During the Cold War, the United States Navy's Mobile Construction Battalion 7 constructed a long-range navigation (LORAN) station on Grahams Harbour at the north end of the island from 1957 to 1959. After the LORAN station was decommissioned, it became the Bahamian Field Station and then the Gerace Research Centre. More than 1,000 students and researchers work from the station every year as a base of operations for studying tropical marine geology, biology, and archaeology.

San Salvador has required extensive rebuilding following Hurricane Lili in 1996, Hurricane Floyd in 1999, and Hurricane Joaquin in 2015. Floyd in particular caused considerable beach erosion.

== Tourism ==
Tourism is the island's main industry, thanks to its historical importance, many sandy beaches, and proximity to the United States. It is served by San Salvador International Airport. Columbus Isle, a Club Med resort, is located just north of the main settlement at Cockburn Town.

The island is home to many shallow-water coral reefs, where snorkellers can observe hundreds of fish species without the use of scuba equipment. The Pleistocene Cockburn Town Fossil Reef is near the main town and resort. Fossilized staghorn coral (Acropora cervicornis) and elkhorn coral (Acropora palmata) are present near the crest of the fossil reef and other corals such as Montastraea annularis, Diploria, and Porites are scattered in the periphery. San Salvador is also known for the quick dropoff of the submerged platform of the island, allowing for numerous deep dive sites. The western coast has many wall reefs with steep drop offs, while the northern coast has many shallow barrier reefs, particularly surrounding the large shallow lagoon of Grahams Harbour.

There are three endemic fish species found only in the inland hypersaline lakes on this island. The scale-eating pupfish (Cyprinodon desquamator), the molluscivore pupfish (Cyprinodon brontotheroides), and the widemouth pupfish (Cyprinodon sp. widemouth) are all endemic to this island.

The Dixon Hill lighthouse is located on the island south of Dixon Hill Settlement on the east side of the island. It is approximately 49 metres (160 ft) tall and was constructed in 1887 by the Imperial Lighthouse Service.

There are also several monuments, ruins, and shipwrecks in the area.

== Government ==
The seat of local government is Cockburn Town, with a population of 271 (2010). The current administrator is Gilbert C. Kemp.

== Gallery ==
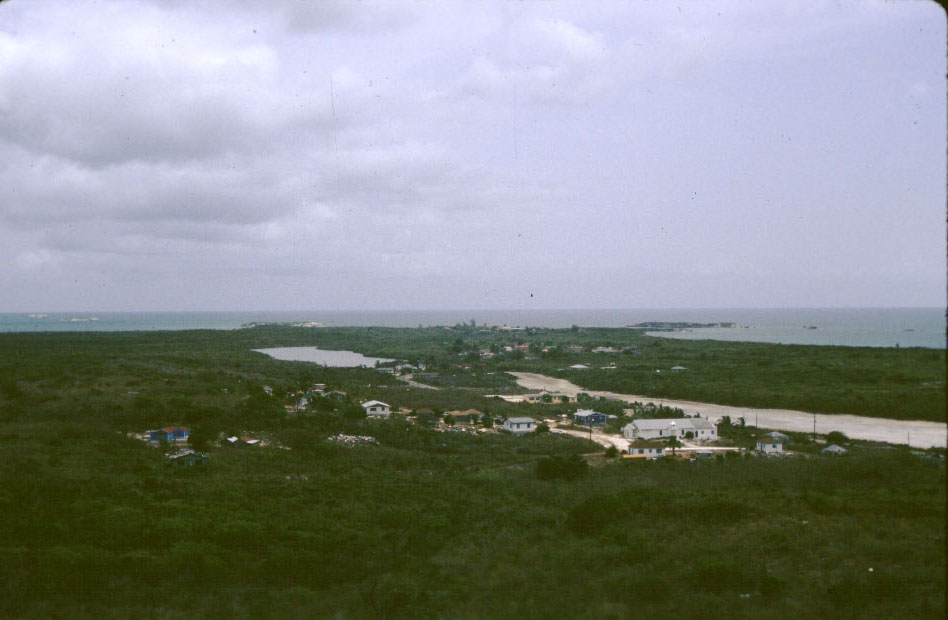
A view of North Point, Rice Bay, and Dixon Hill Settlement, facing north from the lighthouse in 1998.

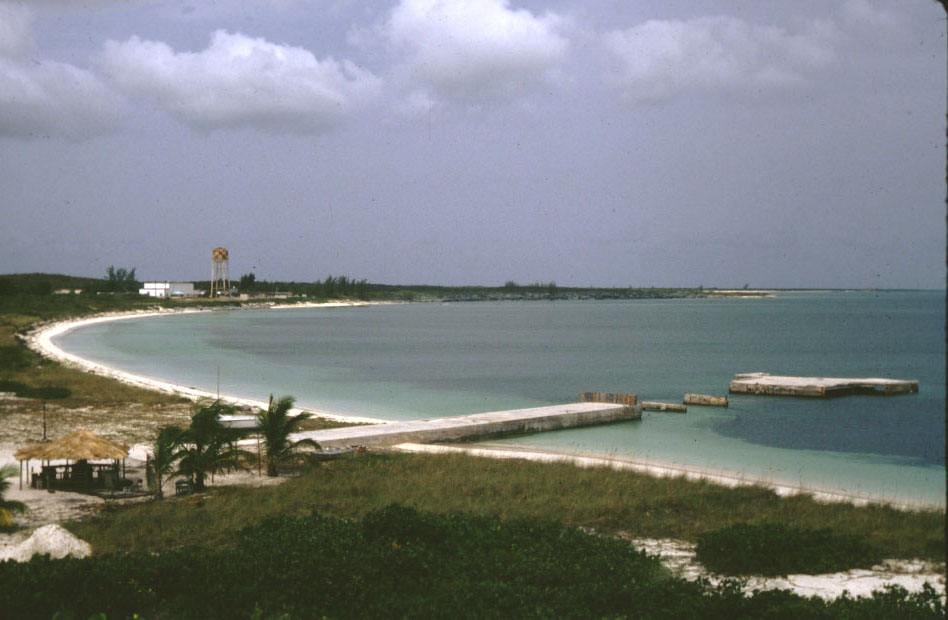
A view of Grahams Harbour facing west from North Point in 1998. The water tower at left is located at the Gerace Research Centre, but no longer stands.

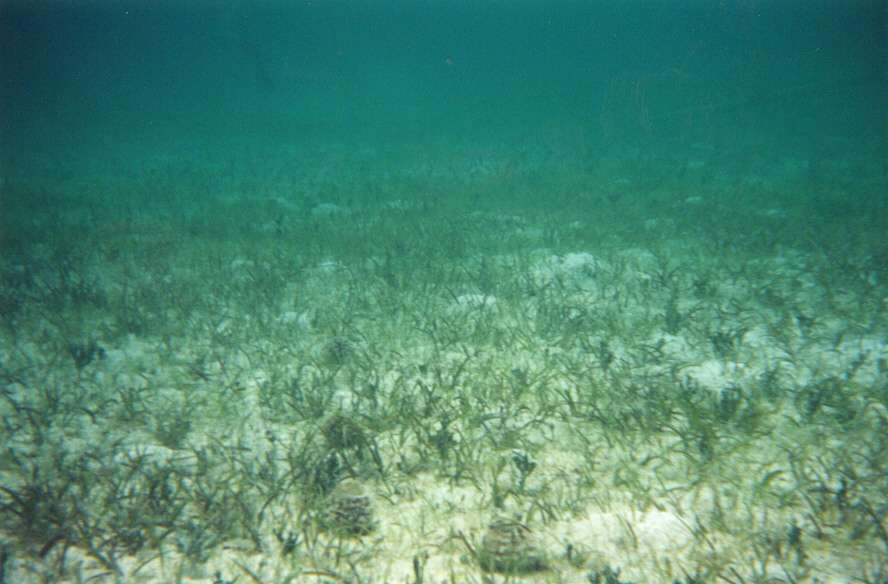
Seagrass (Thalassia testudinum) bed with several echinoids (Tripneustes ventricosus), Grahams Harbour, 1999

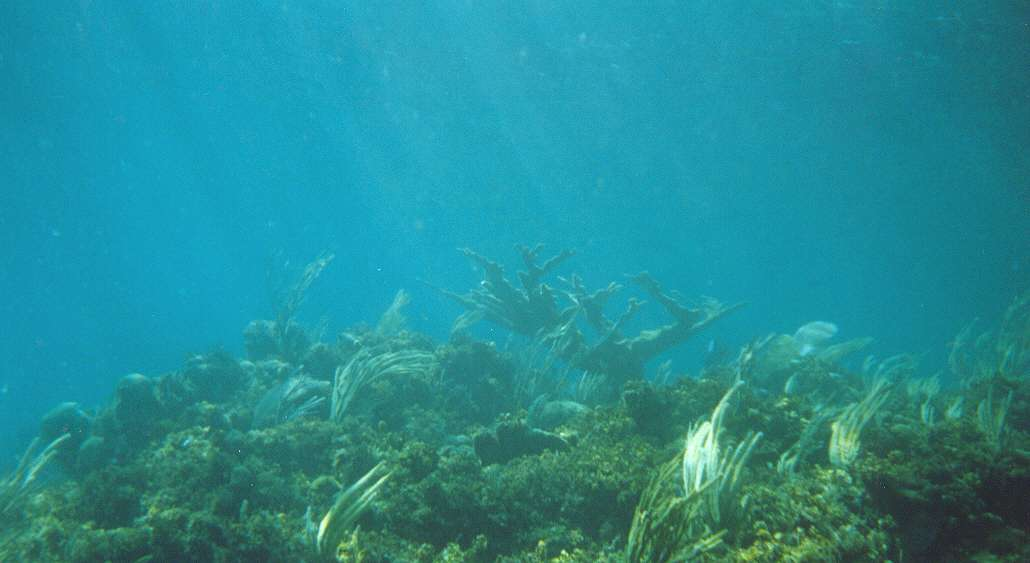
Elkhorn coral (Acropora palmata) on the crest of Gaulin Reef in 1999
