= Egg Island (The Bahamas) =

Island in The Bahamas

Coordinates: 25°29.5′N 76°53′W

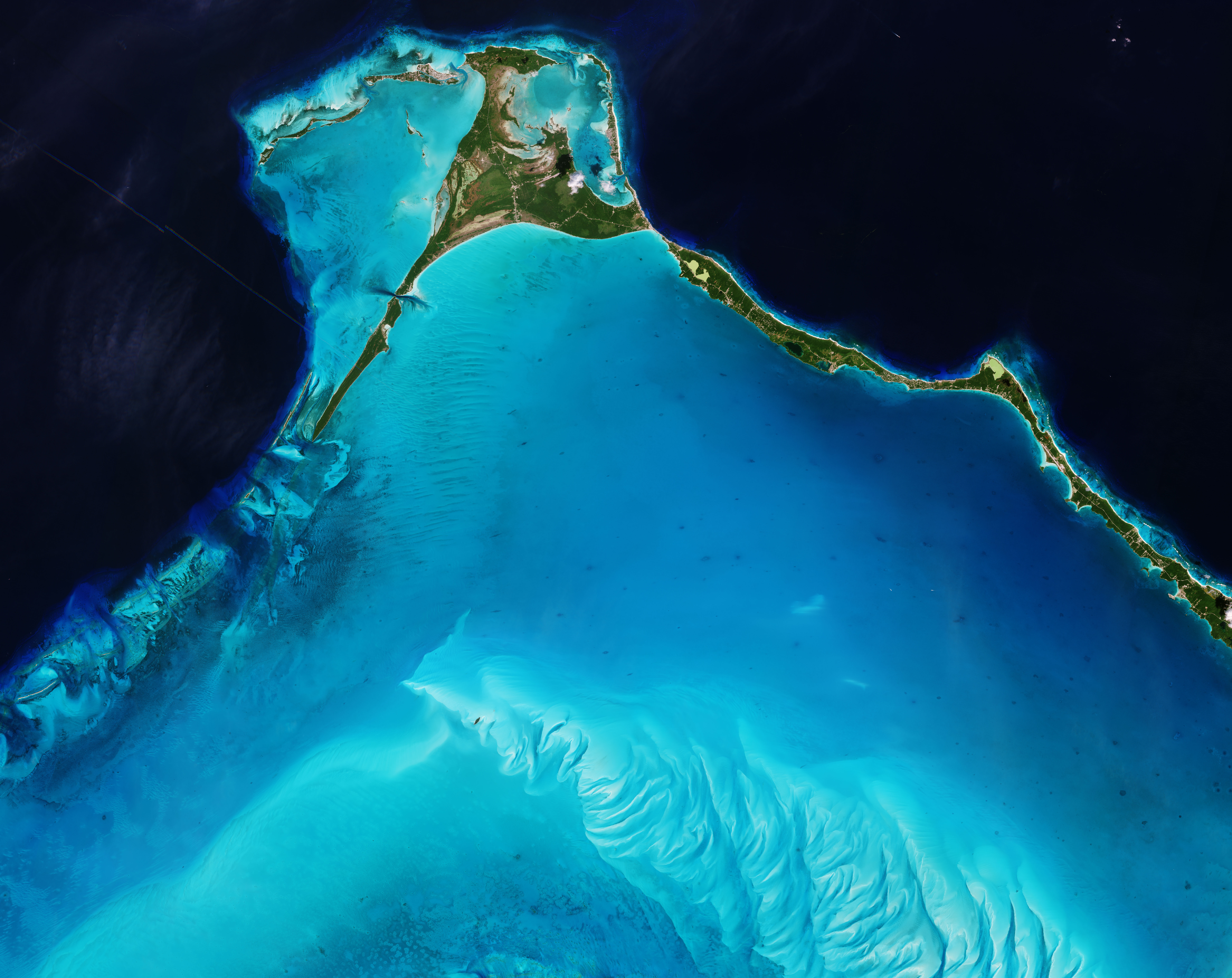
Egg Island, Bahamas

Egg Island is an uninhabited island, officially an islet, comprising 800 m^{2} (8,611 sq ft) in the Bahamas. It is thought to be named because of the supposed chickens owned by residents of other nearby islands who travel here to collect the eggs; however, there are no chickens on Egg Island. Another theory is that local sea bird eggs were often collected here by the first settlers, these were then wiped out by the introduction of goats to the island a long time ago.

The island has a crescent shaped beach that is protected by a reef that protects the entire beach. The water behind the reef is generally less than 2 metres (6 ft 7 in) deep making it a good place to swim or watch the sea life. Since the water is so shallow and well protected, it tends to be warmer than the surrounding sea.

The Egg Island Lighthouse was built in 1891. Egg Island gained some fame in the 1980s when Arne Molander claimed that this was the first island where Columbus landed in his 1492 voyage to the New World.

Off the island is the wreck of the Arimoroa.

Recently, Egg Island has gained international recognition after Disney Cruise Line started exploring the area for possible development of a cruise ship port. This project would have entailed dredging the sea bed to make way for a cruise ship port, drilling into and destroying coral reefs. Residents of nearby Spanish Wells and north Eleuthera were extremely concerned at the implications and started a petition to have the sale of Egg Island to Disney halted. The primary concern is that Egg Island is a natural nursery for sea turtles, juvenile fish including snapper and grouper, crawfish (lobster), conch, stingrays, sea birds and other wild sealife, and any disturbance to the delicate eco-system would prove fatal to these animals and by default, detrimental to the local fishing industry. After the petition was signed by thousands and much agitation, Disney announced that due to the environmental impact, they would not proceed with the project. Joseph Darville spoke on behalf of local environmental organisation Save the Bays and Waterkeepers Bahamas, stating in a public release, "“The corporate entity, Disney Cruise Lines, demonstrated responsibility and made the right choice. The community got together and spoke in a voice that could not be ignored about an activity that would have changed their way of life and could have destroyed much of the fish population on which they depend for their livelihood because the reefs and the mangroves around Egg Island are important fish, conch and crawfish nurseries and habitats. And the environmental impact assessment did what it was created for. Based on science, not emotion, it showed that there would have been damage and destruction of the marine environment.”
