= Overcreek Dam =

- Location within South Carolina
- Country: United States
- Location: Forest Acres, Richland County, South Carolina
- Coordinates: 34°2′22.26″N 80°57′5.33″W
- Status: Breached
- Demolition date: 5 October 2015

Dam and spillways
- Type of dam: Earth-fill
- Impounds: Rockyford Creek

The Overcreek Dam was an earth-fill embankment dam on Rockyford Creek, a tributary of Gills Creek, in Forest Acres of Richland County, South Carolina. It was breached by flooding on 5 October 2015, due to record rainfall in South Carolina.
