= October 2015 North American storm complex =

Extratropical storm in 2015

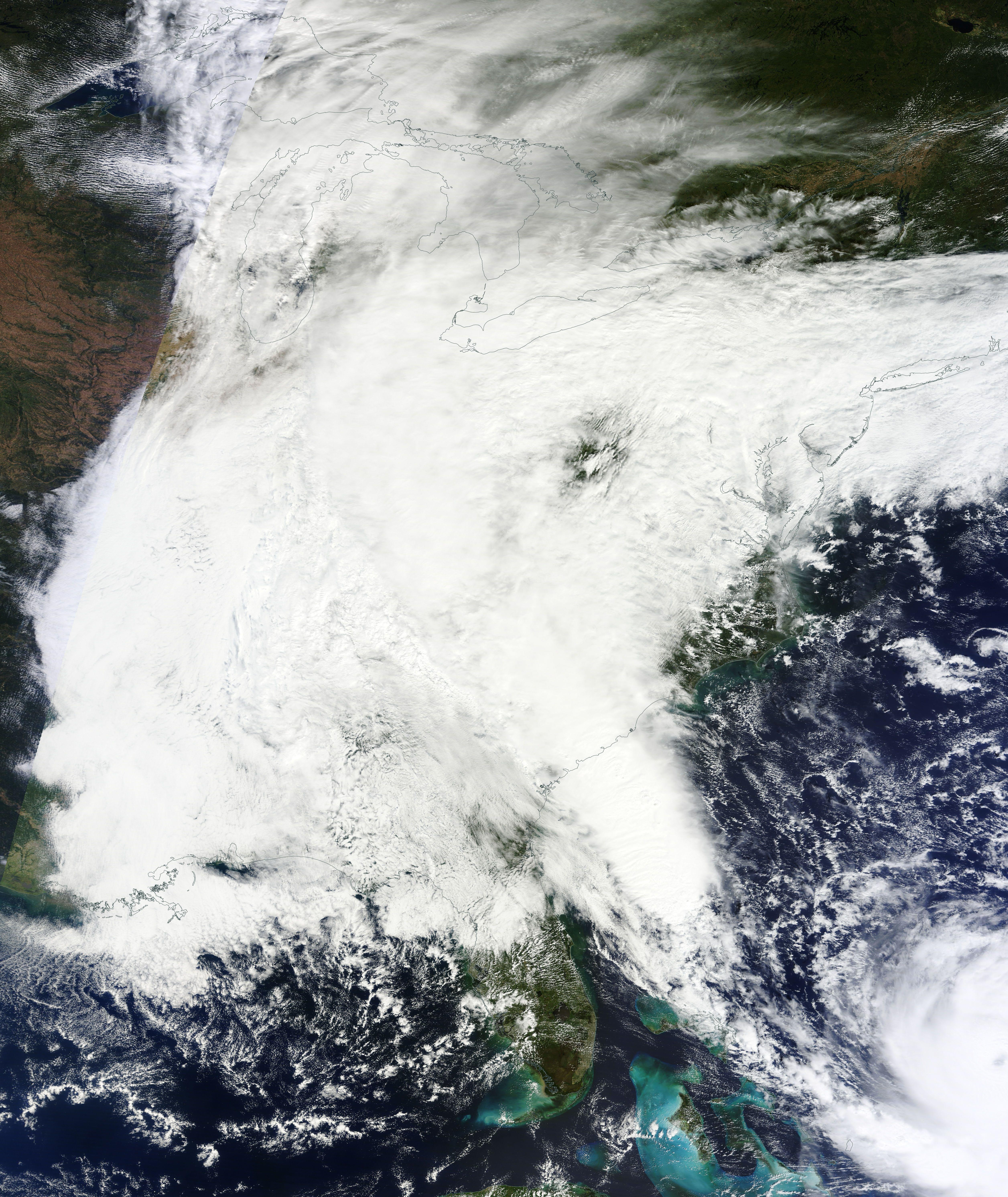
- Satellite image of the storm over the Eastern United States on October 3, with Hurricane Joaquin to the southeast.

Meteorological history
- Formed: September 29, 2015
- Dissipated: October 7, 2015

Extratropical storm
- Lowest pressure: 998 mbar (998 hPa)
- Max. rainfall: 26.88 in (683 mm) near Mount Pleasant, South Carolina

Overall effects
- Fatalities: At least 25 deaths
- Damage: $2 billion (2015 USD)
- Areas affected: Eastern United States (especially South Carolina), Atlantic Canada

The October 2015 North American storm complex was an extratropical storm that triggered a high precipitation event, which caused historic flash flooding across North and South Carolina. The incipient cold front traversed the Eastern United States on September 29–30, producing heavy rain in multiple states. The system subsequently stalled just offshore. Tapping into moisture from the nearby Hurricane Joaquin, a developing surface low brought heavy, continuous rain to southeastern States, with the worst effects concentrated in South Carolina where catastrophic flooding occurred. The event culminated in South Carolina on October 4 when numerous rivers burst their banks, washing away roads, bridges, vehicles, and homes. Hundreds of people required rescue and the state's emergency management department urged everyone in the state not to travel. Some areas of the state saw rainfall equivalent to a 1-in-1000-year event.

At least 25 deaths have been attributed to the weather complex: 19 in South Carolina, 2 in New York, 2 in North Carolina, 1 in Florida, and 1 in New Brunswick. Damage from the storm reached $2 billion.

== Meteorological synopsis ==
Map plotting the storm's track and intensity, according to the Saffir–Simpson scale Map key Saffir–Simpson scale Tropical depression (≤38 mph, ≤62 km/h) Tropical storm (39–73 mph, 63–118 km/h) Category 1 (74–95 mph, 119–153 km/h) Category 2 (96–110 mph, 154–177 km/h) Category 3 (111–129 mph, 178–208 km/h) Category 4 (130–156 mph, 209–251 km/h) Category 5 (≥157 mph, ≥252 km/h) Unknown Storm type Tropical cyclone Subtropical cyclone Extratropical cyclone, remnant low, tropical disturbance, or monsoon depression

On September 29, 2015, a cold front moved southeast across the Eastern United States and produced widespread heavy rain. By October 2, the frontal system stalled offshore and a 1000 mbar (hPa; 29.53 inHg) surface low developed just east of the Florida–Georgia border. The cyclone interacted with Hurricane Joaquin—situated over the Bahamas at the time—with moisture streaming north from the hurricane into the Southeastern United States. This moisture interacted with the surface low, frontal boundary, and a strong upper-level low to produce prolonged, heavy rains over the region with training bands situated over South Carolina. A strengthening ridge to the northeast created a tighter pressure gradient, resulting in a large area of onshore gales.

== Preparations ==
Infrared satellite animation from October 1–5 depicting the evolution of the rainfall event over South Carolina.

On September 30, Virginia Governor Terry McAuliffe declared a state of emergency for the entire state owing to heavy rains and the threat of Hurricane Joaquin. The City of Norfolk also declared an emergency. On October 1, Governors Larry Hogan, Chris Christie, Pat McCrory, and Nikki Haley declared a state of emergency for Maryland, New Jersey, North Carolina, and South Carolina respectively.

By October 3, approximately 22 million people were under flood warnings or watches. The storm prompted the cancellation of 145 flights nationwide.

== Impact ==
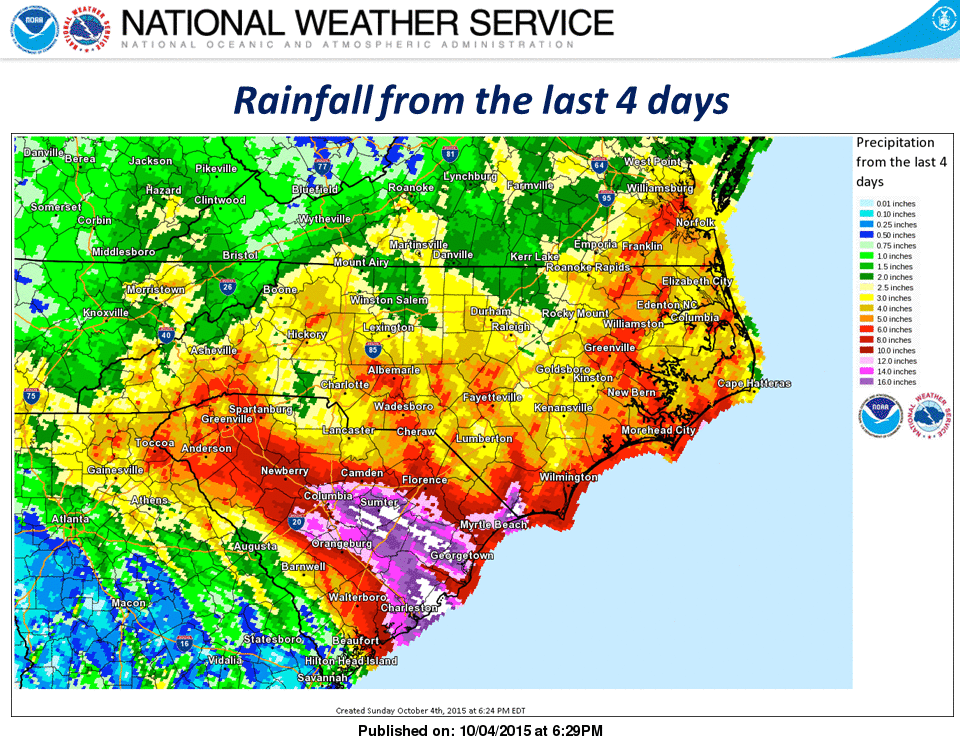
Rainfall accumulations across the Carolinas and surrounding states from October 1–4, ending at 6:24 p.m. EDT (22:24 UTC). Areas in white indicate accumulations in excess of 20 in (510 mm).

=== Southeastern states ===
One person was killed in North Carolina on October 1 when a tree fell on her car. Flooding in Brunswick County, North Carolina prompted the evacuation of 400–500 people. More than 10,000 people were without power in the state. A second death was confirmed on October 5.

On October 4, a 9-year-old drowned after being pulled out to sea by rip currents near St. Pete Beach, Florida.

==== South Carolina ====
Rainfall across parts of South Carolina reached 500-year event levels, with areas near Columbia experiencing a 1-in-1000 year event. Accumulations reached 24.23 in (615 mm) near Boone Hall by 11:00 a.m. EDT (15:00 UTC) on October 4. Charleston International Airport saw a record 24-hour rainfall of 11.5 in (290 mm) on October 3. Nearly 30,000 people were without power in the state. One woman drowned in Spartanburg on October 1 after her car was overwhelmed by flooding in an underpass. On October 2, a plane crashed along the South Carolina side of Lake Hartwell, killing all four occupants. The cause is currently unknown though there was light rain at the time of the incident. On October 3, the Charleston Historic District was brought to a virtual standstill with most roads closed because of flooding. Three deaths were confirmed in the state on October 2 and 3. Through the evening of October 3, highway patrol reported 500 traffic accidents and 104 flooded roads.

Early on October 4, the National Weather Service issued flash flood emergencies for Berkeley, Charleston, and Dorchester counties. From 4:00–7:30 a.m. EDT (08:00–11:30 UTC), Gills Creek in Columbia rapidly rose to 17.08 ft (5.21 m) before the river gauge stopped reporting; this shattered the previous record crest of 9.43 ft (2.87 m) in July 1997. The state's Emergency Management Division issued a statement later that morning via Twitter at 6:59 a.m. EDT, stating: "... remain where you are if you are safely able to do so." They reiterated this at 8:20 a.m., stressing that residents should not travel: "Remain. Where. You. Are. Dangerous flooding conditions through the state for most of the day." The State's Emergency Management division also issued a statement not to move or drive around barricades blocking flooded roads, yet drivers still moved and/or drove around barricades. Three subjects died after someone else removed a barricade from a road; in the darkness, the three were unable to see that the road had been washed out, and they drove into a chasm. A dam along Semmes Lake at Fort Jackson collapsed. More than 140 rescues were made during the overnight hours; the United States Coast Guard was deployed to assist in rescue missions.

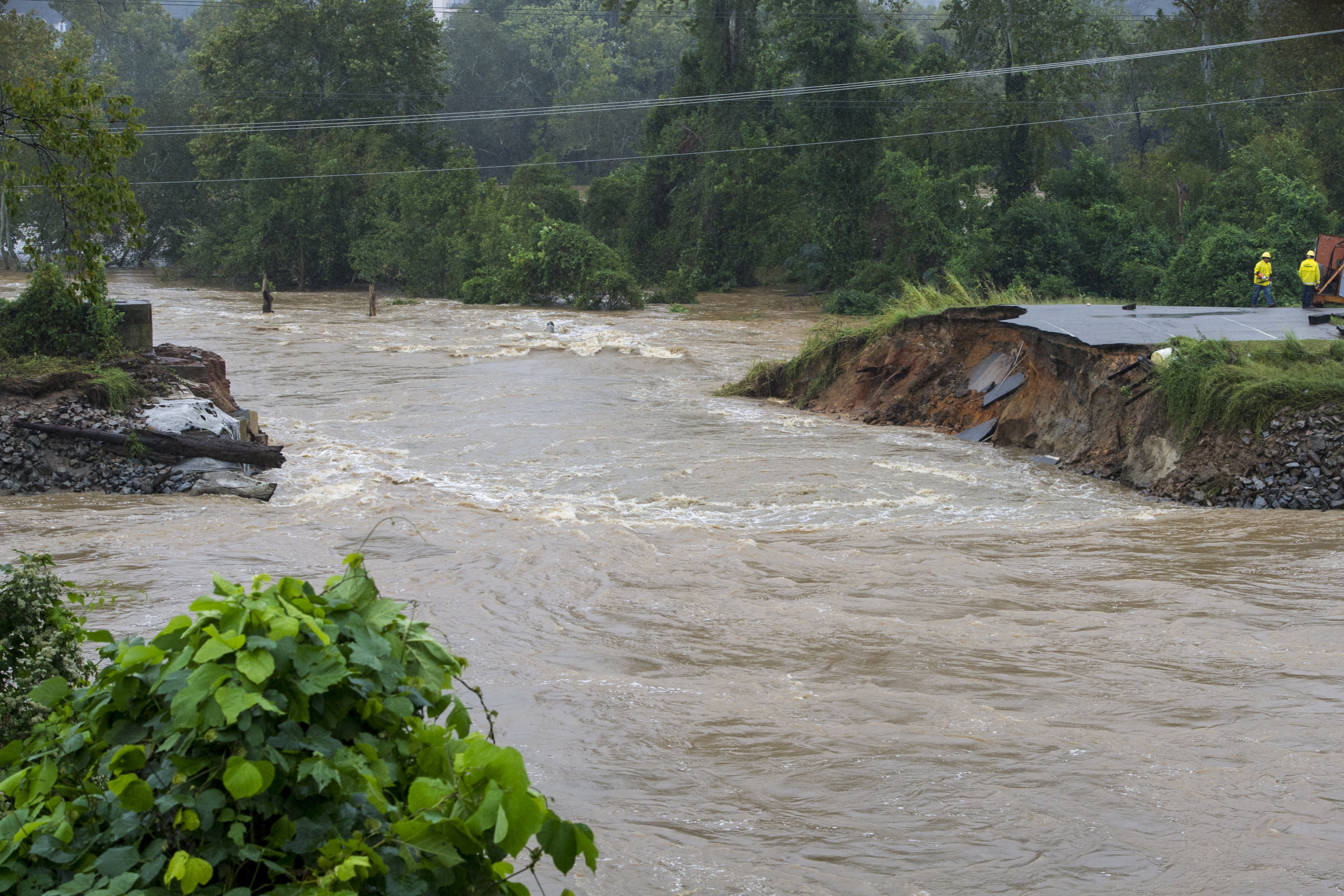
A levee breach near Columbia, South Carolina, on October 5

At 10:54 a.m. EDT (14:54 UTC) on October 4, 211 state roads and 43 bridges were closed. On the same day, Georgetown County Emergency Management closed all roadways in the county because of severe flooding; the South Carolina Emergency Management Division announced the closure of Interstate 95 between Interstate 20 and Interstate 26, a 70 mi (110 km) stretch. A mandatory curfew was put in place for Columbia beginning at 6:00 p.m. EDT (22:00 UTC). All residents in the city were also advised to boil water as water lines suffered damage. One person died in the city after her car was swept away. Multiple school districts and colleges across the state were closed the week of October 5th, including Horry County Schools, Georgetown County Schools, Williamsburg County Schools, Sumter County Schools, Charleston County Schools, University of South Carolina, Coastal Carolina University and College of Charleston.

Eighteen dams were breached or collapsed across the state. A mandatory evacuation was issued for areas downstream of the Overcreek Dam on October 5 after the structure was breached. The head of the South Carolina National Guard compared damage from the floods to Hurricane Hugo in 1989, which caused $9.5 billion in economic losses. Reinsurance company Aon Benfield indicated losses from the floods would be well in excess of $1 billion, with a large portion coming from uninsured homeowners.

At least 19 deaths were confirmed in relation to the storm, by the evening of October 9, 2015.

The fallout from the flooding forced the South Carolina Gamecocks to move their October 10 home game against the LSU Tigers to Tiger Stadium in Baton Rouge. While Williams-Brice Stadium in Columbia was not heavily damaged, school officials felt the damage to the area's infrastructure was too severe to host the game.

=== Northeastern states ===
In Virginia, heavy rains resulted in numerous traffic accidents; state police responded to 375 incidents on October 3. Police received more than 1,200 calls that day. Power outages affected 7,300 customers at the height of the storm. The James River approached flood levels, and hundreds evacuated low-lying areas in Lancaster County on Virginia's Northern Neck.

Tidal flooding in Ocean City, Maryland prompted road closures. Rainfall in the state peaked at 4.67 in (119 mm) near Bishopville. In Delaware, the storm caused coastal flooding, with Delaware Route 1 between Bethany Beach and Dewey Beach closed on October 2 due to flooding and not reopened until October 4.

Several days of continuous onshore flow caused significant coastal flooding and beach erosion in New Jersey. The worst erosion took place in Ocean County, specifically around Mantoloking, where 15 ft (4.6 m) of sand was washed away; Ortley Beach saw up to 10 ft (3.0 m). Wind gusts up to 62 mph (100 km/h)—the highest observed winds in relation to the nor'easter—were measured at Cape May. Coastal flooding in New Jersey destroyed at least one home. Stone Harbor sustained millions of dollars in damage to the beach. At least 3,600 residences lost power in the state. Despite severe coastal erosion, structural damage was limited.

On October 2, a fishing boat with five crew capsized amid 10 to 15 ft (3.0 to 4.6 m) swells in Jamaica Bay, near Floyd Bennett Field along the south coast of Long Island, New York. Two people were able to swim to shore and signal rescue for the other three; two later died in the hospital.

Flooding in Portland, Maine stranded several vehicles.

Three Major League Baseball games were postponed due to the storm complex: a New York Mets vs Washington Nationals game, a New York Yankees vs Baltimore Orioles game and a Miami Marlins vs Philadelphia Phillies game.

=== Atlantic Canada ===
Heavy rains associated with the incipient frontal boundary extended into Atlantic Canada, with 6.3 in (160 mm) of rain observed in parts of New Brunswick. Widespread flooding washed out roads and bridges, impairing travel; Hoyt was rendered inaccessible. One person died in Berwick after a retaining wall collapsed on him.

== Aftermath ==
A pole at a park in Cheraw, South Carolina. The ring around the pole indicates the height of the Pee Dee River during the 2015 flood.

President Barack Obama declared parts of South Carolina a disaster area, making federal aid available in Charleston, Berkeley, Dorchester, Georgetown, Horry, Lexington, Orangeburg, Richland, and Williamsburg Counties. Calhoun, Clarendon, Kershaw, Lee, and Sumter counties were later added to the list of federal disaster areas. More than 1,300 National Guard soldiers and 250 state troopers were mobilized across the state. The United States Department of Transportation released $5 million in emergency funds to the South Carolina Department of Transportation on October 6. On October 16, the following counties were added to the list of federal disaster areas: Abbeville, Anderson, Bamberg, Colleton, Darlington, Fairfield, Florence, Laurens, McCormick, and Newberry counties.

Looting was reported in some areas of Columbia that had been evacuated.

It was announced on October 9 that 18 bridges along 13 miles of Interstate 95 had foundation damage that still needed repairs, which would start October 10. Until the repairs were done, drivers had to make a detour of 94 extra miles by Columbia. Southbound lanes on the final 16 miles of Interstate 95 opened October 12 and all of the interstate reopened by 8 A.M. EDT on October 13, after structural repairs to 13 bridges.

By November 25, 2015, over 69 roads were still closed. 26 of those needed repair or replacement of private dams to take place. A South Carolina Department of Transportation report said 221 bridges were affected and 18 would have to be replaced. Workers removed 2000 truckloads of debris from roads. The estimated cost of road repairs was $137 million.

== See also ==
- 2015 Atlantic hurricane season
- November 2009 nor'easter ("Nor'Ida")
- Hurricane Florence
