= Egg Island Lighthouse =

- Location: Egg Island, Spanish Wells, The Bahamas
- Coordinates: 25°29′54″N 76°52′55″W

Tower
- Constructed: 1891
- Foundation: concrete base
- Construction: metal skeletal tower
- Height: 18 m (59 ft)
- Shape: square pyramidal tower with light
- Markings: White
- Power source: solar power

Light
- Focal height: 34 m (112 ft)
- Range: 12 nmi (22 km; 14 mi)
- Characteristic: Fl W 3s

Egg Island Lighthouse is a lighthouse on Egg Island.

== See also ==
- List of lighthouses in the Bahamas
