= Plana Cays =

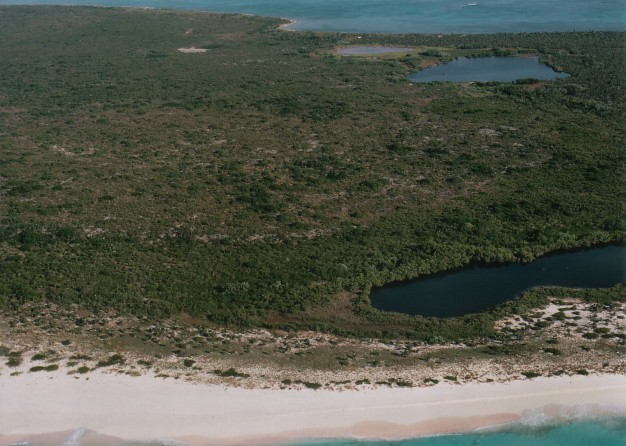
- The western Plana Cay, looking northeast

- Location within Bahamas

Geography
- Location: Atlantic Ocean
- Coordinates: 22.600°N 73.573°W
- Type: Cay
- Archipelago: Lucayan Archipelago

Administration
- Bahamas

The Plana Cays are a group of two small uninhabited islands in the southern Bahama Islands, located east of Acklins Island and west of Mayaguana Island. The indigenous Lucayan people called the islands Amaguaya, meaning "toward the middle lands".

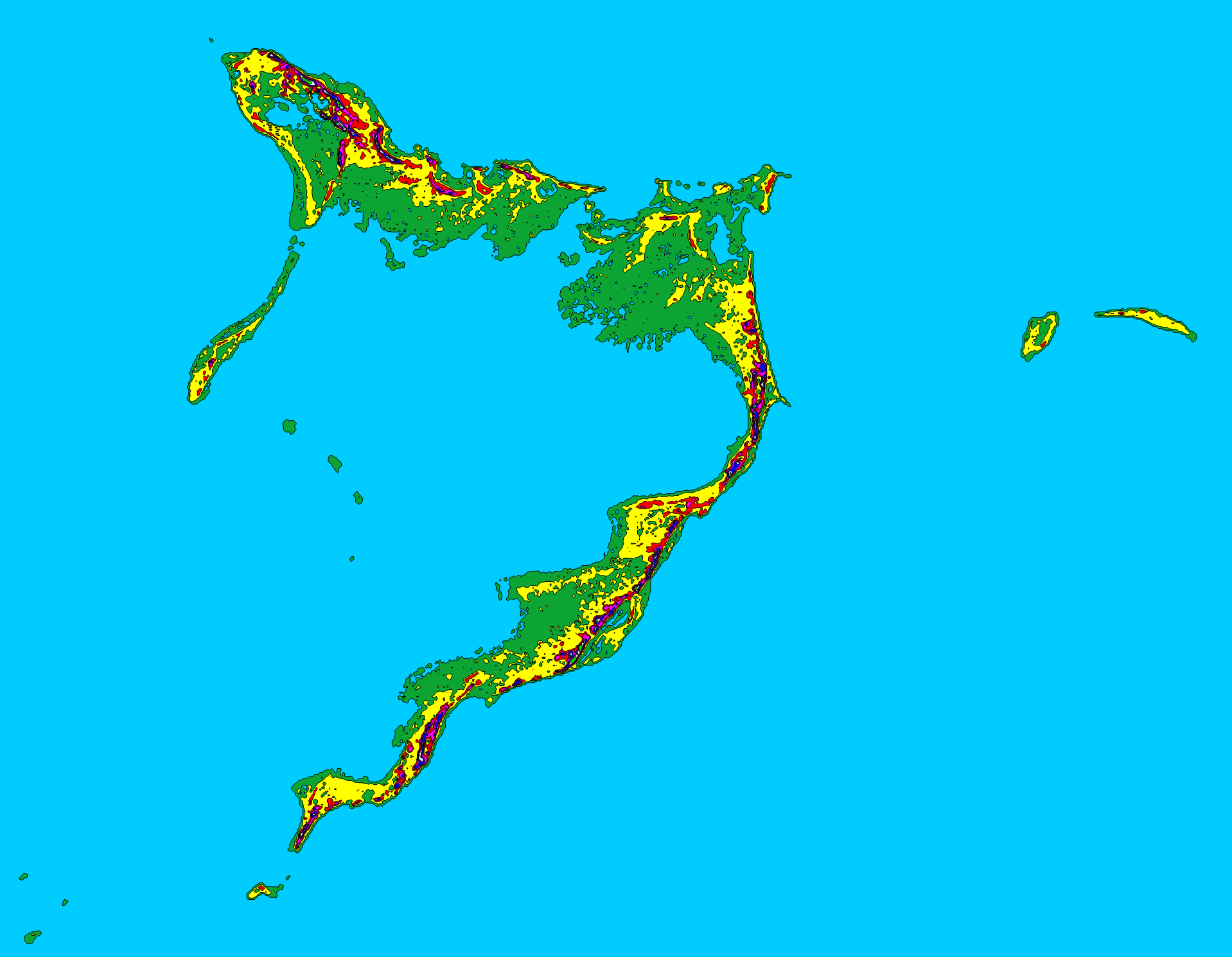
Topographic map of Acklins Island and Crooked Island, with Plana Cays in the east (right).

The eastern cay was the last natural habitat of the Bahamian Hutia, a species of rabbit-sized rodent. It was thought to be extinct until 1966, when a population was found on the Plana Cays by biologist Garrett Clough. Hutias have since been transplanted from the Plana Cays to other parts of the Bahamas.

The Plana Cays have been suggested as the first landfall of Christopher Columbus in the New World.
