= Guanahani =

Island in the Bahamas which Christopher Columbus landed on

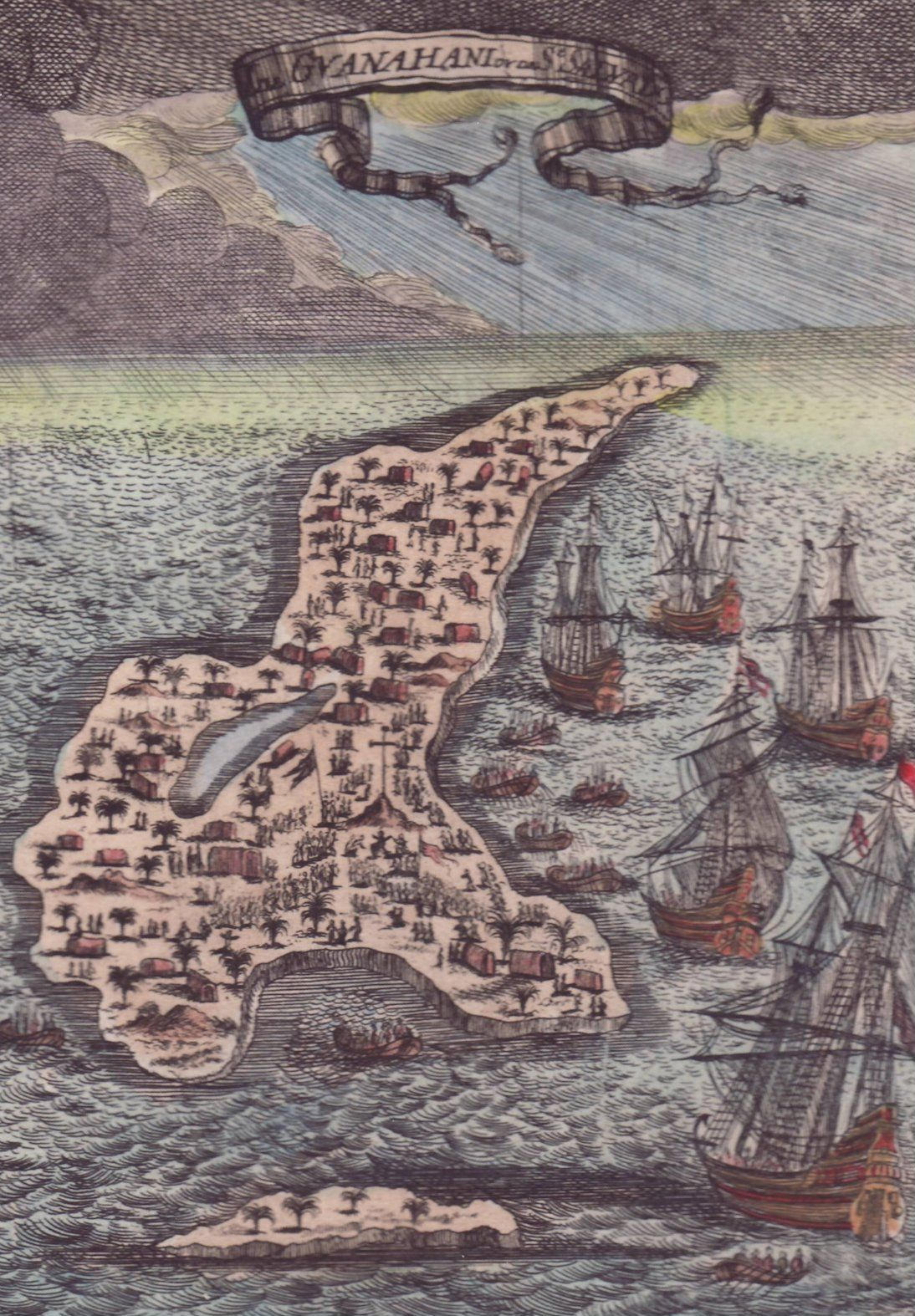
This page from Alain Manesson Mallet's five-volume world atlas shows the islet of Guanahani, the site of Columbus' first landing in 1492

Guanahaní (meaning "small upper waters land") was the Lucayan name of an island in the Bahamas that was the first land in the New World sighted and visited by Christopher Columbus' first voyage, on 12 October 1492. It is a bean-shaped island that Columbus called San Salvador. Guanahaní has traditionally been identified with Watlings Island, which was officially renamed San Salvador Island in 1925 as a result, but modern scholars are divided on the accuracy of this identification and several alternative candidates in and around the southern Bahamas have been proposed as well.

== Primary sources ==
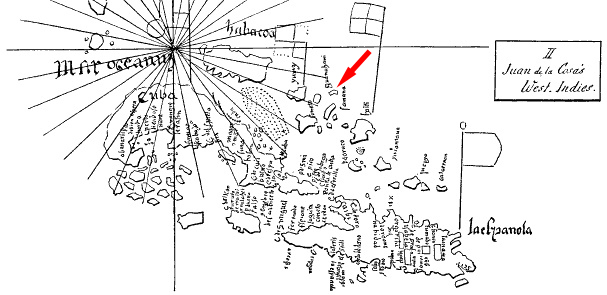
The region of the Greater Antilles in the map of de la Cosa. The red arrow points to Guanahani island. Original hand sketch by P.J.J. Valentini (1828–1899).

=== Letter from Columbus himself ===
Upon his return to Spain in the spring of 1493, Columbus wrote a letter to Luis de Santangel, one of his patrons at the Royal Court of Castile. The letter was printed widely and translated into many languages, spreading the news of the discovery throughout Europe. In the letter, Columbus mentions Guanahani as the name of the first island he discovered, but provides no other details. Nevertheless, this single mention in a widely printed letter would have been enough to make the name Guanahani widely known at an early date.

=== Map of Juan de la Cosa ===
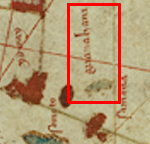
Guanahani ("San Salvador"), found by Columbus in 1492. Label and islets marked within the red box.

Juan de la Cosa was the owner and master of the Santa María and as such sailed with Columbus on the first voyage. He was also a cartographer, and in 1500 de la Cosa drew a map of the world which is widely known as the earliest European map showing the New World. The Caribbean portion of the map shows Cuba and Hispaniola clearly, and a much more confused rendering of the Bahamas. Nevertheless, Guanahani is drawn in the Bahamas in a form that appears to show a group of islets rather than a single island, lying due north of the Windward Passage between Cuba and Haiti, in the central part of the Bahamas islands chain.

=== Diario ===
Columbus' so-called log, more properly referred to as the Diario, is an abstract made by Bartolomé de las Casas, a Spanish monk and friend of the Columbus family, probably sometime in the 1540s.

When Columbus returned to Spain after his first voyage, he reported to the royal court at Barcelona and presented his original log to the Spanish sovereigns. Queen Isabella ordered that the log be copied. The original soon disappeared, but the so-called 'Barcelona copy' was returned to Columbus prior to his second voyage and was in his possession at the time of his death in 1506. It then passed to his son Fernando and remained in his vast library for many years. At some point, Las Casas obtained the Barcelona copy and made the abstract now called the Diario. Although most of the Diario is written in the third-person of Las Casas, nearly all of that portion dealing with Columbus' movements in the Bahamas is in the first person of Columbus himself, and is (according to Las Casas) a direct quote from the Barcelona copy.

The Barcelona copy disappeared late in the 16th century, but Las Casas' Diario was discovered intact in 1795 by Ferdinand de Navarette and published 30 years later. The Diario remains the most authoritative and detailed account of Columbus' movements and activities on the first voyage.

=== Biography by Sebastian LaFrance and Fernando Colón ===
In 1571, a biography of Christopher Columbus, written in Italian, was published in Venice. The book was a translation of a Spanish manuscript written by Columbus' second son, Fernando Colón, between 1537 and 1539. The Spanish manuscript eventually was translated into Italian and published by Alfonso Ulloa, a Spaniard making his living in Venice as a professional translator.

It is clear from the context that Fernando must have been working from the Barcelona copy when he wrote the portion of the biography describing the first voyage, as many details in the biography agree precisely with the Diario. In that sense, the primary utility of the biography is as a validity check on the Diario, a test which vindicates Las Casas in many respects. However, there are a few descriptions in the biography that are not already in the Diario. Most importantly, the biography asserts that Guanahani was fifteen leagues (45 miles) long, which seems contrary to Columbus' implication in the Diario that he had seen the entire island on a single day's boat trip.

== Description of San Salvador/Guanahani ==
Columbus calls the island "very flat and with very green trees", which is true for all of the islands proposed by historians. His next statement is more problematic. He says Guanahani has "muchas aguas y una laguna en medio muy grande" – many waters and a very large laguna in the middle (or "in between"). The word laguna creates many problems. It is uncertain whether it means lagoon or pond. In any case, most of the proposed islands have either a lagoon or a pond; only East Caicos lacks one.

On 14 October, Columbus made a boat trip to "the other part, which was the eastern part" of Guanahani. Therefore, he went the length of the island in a north-northeast direction. This is possible only at Plana Cays, Conception and Egg, and to a very minor extent at Samana Cay. Columbus noticed a reef that completely surrounded the island. All proposed islands have a reef, but the ones on Cat and Watling's do not completely surround the island. Between the reef and the island was a harbor "large enough to store all ships of Christendom." This could easily have been an exaggeration. The harbor on Egg is definitely too small, although it is fairly appropriate for the impressive harbor at the neighboring islet of Royal Island, which could have been considered part of the same larger island he named "San Salvador" (the other "part, which is the eastern part"). Columbus went on land and saw "a piece of land, that looked like an island, but actually wasn't one." This is difficult to track, because it may have become a real island in the past 500 years.

=== One Island or Two? ===
Guanahani Depiction on De la Cosa Map

One question in dispute is whether Guanahani was one island or more than one as proposed by Keith Pickering, an independent researcher who did an exhaustive analysis of where Columbus first made landfall. Pickering made the novel suggestion that Guanahani appeared to be two islands and not one on the De la Cosa map, though he also noted that other researchers, including Jim Kelley, hypothesized loss of pigmentation on the map. Pickering never documented a visit to the Naval Museum in Madrid, Spain, where the De la Cosa map is on display to verify this hypothesis. A subsequent researcher, Graham Balch, observed the De la Cosa map in person and produced photographic evidence in line with Jim Kelley's assertion showing not only that Guanahani, in person and with better photographic equipment, appears to be one island, but that other islands depicted with the same ink color as Guanahani also showed similar loss of pigment patterns in the oxhide parchment.

Evidence from the Diario supports one island instead of two, but not conclusively. Columbus notes, "This island is rather large and very flat." But the next day he writes that he went along the coast "to see the other side, which was on the other side to the east"; and to explore that eastern part, he used a boat rather than walking. The use of a boat to reach the eastern part could be due to distance or there being separate islands unreachable by foot.

== Transatlantic track ==
The first way to locate Guanahani is to follow the distances and directions Columbus gave in his log. This procedure is difficult because of the uncertainties in knowing the length of Columbus' league, the speed and direction of ocean currents, and the exact direction his magnetic compass would have pointed in 1492.

John McElroy was one of the first to attempt this in 1941, using a speculative magnetic chart for the year 1500 and currents from pilot charts. His vast overrun in distance was corrected by a fudge factor, leaving his endpoint in the vicinity of Watling's Island. This result was substantially confirmed by Doug Peck's sailing voyage of 1991.

In 1986, Luis Marden of the National Geographic Society applied currents to the first half of the voyage (but not the second half) and determined Samana Cay as the most probable landfall. In 1992, Goldsmith and Richardson used vector average currents (rather than prevailing currents) along with an updated magnetic field, and found a track that ended in the vicinity of Grand Turk Island. In 2004, Keith Pickering applied magnetic declinations from a more modern source and found a track that ended in the vicinity of the Plana Cays.

=== Light seen on the evening preceding the discovery ===
At 10 p.m. on 11 October Columbus saw a light "like a small wax candle that rose and lifted up". He pointed it out to other people on board, some of whom were able to see the light, while others did not. The actual landfall was about 35 miles from the location Columbus saw the light, so if taken that the light was from a ground-based source, then it could not have been from Guanahani, but must have been from another island farther east. For the Plana Cays theory, the light would have been on Mayaguana. For Conception, it could have been on Cat Island, Watlings Island, or Rum Cay. For Caicos, it could have been on Grand Turk. For Providenciales, it could have been North Caicos. For Cat Island, it could have been on Watlings Island, and for Lignum Vitae Cay it could have been Eleuthera Island. The Watling's, Grand Turk, and Egg Island theories have no ready explanation.

== Inter-island track ==
Besides the transatlantic track, the other important method for determining the location of Guanahani is the inter-island track, which can be traced either forward (from Guanahani to Cuba) or backward (from Cuba to Guanahani). Given the numerous descriptions of courses, distances, and directions in the log, this method seems more likely to pinpoint the location, and has been by far the method most frequently used by historians.

It was common practice among 20th-century historians to refer to the various Bahamian islands visited by Columbus by Roman numerals to avoid confusion: Island I being Guanahani, Island II being the second island visited by Columbus (which he named Santa María de la Concepción); followed by Island III (named Fernandina by Columbus) and Island IV (called Samoete by the Indigenous inhabitants and renamed Isabela by Columbus).

Following these four islands, Columbus next visited a string of seven or more islands in a line running north–south (which historians generally agree must be the modern Ragged Island, Bahamas) before landing on the north coast of Cuba. A successful inter-island track must therefore navigate from Guanahani to the Ragged Islands in a way that fits the descriptions of the log without serious infidelity. Strictly speaking this is impossible, as there are a few places where the log seems to contradict itself.

=== Island II ===
Leaving Guanahani late on 14 October, Columbus said "I saw so many islands I did not know how to decide which one I would go to first". Aiming for the largest, he estimated its distance by eye at five leagues, while other islands were both nearer and farther than that.

He arrived at Island II around noon, delayed by a contrary marea (usually translated as "tide", although "breeze" is possible), re-estimating the distance as seven leagues rather than five. Island II had a coastline facing Guanahani that ran north–south for five leagues, and another coastline ("which I followed", says Columbus) that ran east–west for more than ten leagues.

At this point comes a contentious passage in the log: "And since from this island I saw another larger one to the west, I spread sail to go forward all that day until night, because [otherwise] I would not have been able to reach the western cape of the island". From this it is unclear whether the "western cape" at which Columbus anchored that night was on the island with the five- and ten-league coastlines, or the larger island to the west; in other words, it is unclear whether Columbus was adjacent to one or two islands on 15 October. Those who prefer the two-island interpretation call these Island IIa and Island IIb.

=== Island III ===
The log gives two descriptions of the sail from Island II to Island III on 16 October: in the first version, Columbus leaves at 10 AM and sails nine leagues east–west to reach Island III; in the second version, Columbus leaves at noon and sails eight leagues "almost east-west" to reach Island III.

Columbus also gives somewhat contradictory information on the size of Island III, saying at first (before actually exploring the island) that it "may well be" more than 28 leagues long; but later saying only that "I saw quite 20 leagues of it but it did not end there."

But Columbus does give quite detailed information on the coastline of Island III, more so than any other island he visited. On the evening of 16 October, he arrived at a cape where the coastlines ran NNW and SSW (though some scholars see a possible transcription error here). The following morning (17 October) he followed the coast NNW, and when he was two leagues distant from the end (or "the cape") of the island, he found a "wonderful harbor" with a small island in its mouth forming two narrow entrances. Going into the harbor with boats, he found it too shallow for use and put the boats ashore for water instead. Leaving the harbor after two hours, he then sailed northwest (rather than the previous NNW) "so far that I viewed all that part of the island as far as the coast that runs east-west".

Thus there are four coastlines described at Island III: from the arrival cape, one coast runs SSW, one runs NNW; following the second coast NNW, Columbus arrived at a harbor; continuing along that coast, the coastline runs NW, and then W. These four coastlines and harbor are an essentially perfect fit with the southern part of Long Island.

Columbus ran into foul weather on the night of 17–18 October and gained sea room to avoid running onto a lee shore. He returned to Island III on the 18th, but the log does not specify where on the island he anchored that night. The following morning, 19 October, he split his fleet to search for the island of Samoete that his kidnapped native guides had told him about.

=== Island IV ===
Leaving his Island III anchorage at dawn, Columbus sent Niña SSE and Santa María SE, while Pinta was sent "east and southeast" (contrary to the ESE mentioned in some sources). Thus the ships were able to sweep a large area of ocean in search of the island whose position was only vaguely known. The Santa María herself raised the island before 9 AM, and signalling the other ships to rejoin, Columbus reached Island IV before noon, arriving at the northern point. Columbus describes this point as being surrounded by a reef, with a small island nearby.

Columbus's descriptions of Island IV are, at best, confusing. He describes Island IV being "on an east-west course" from Island III (which contradicts his previous description of the fleet's movements in the search), and he also asserts that from the northern point the coast ran west for 12 leagues, to its western cape, Cabo Hermoso. The direction of this coastline running west contradicts both Columbus's own arrival at the island (since he arrived at the north point by sailing east, and did not arrive at Cabo Hermoso first) and his later description of his departure from this northern end of Island IV (as he departed sailing SSW and yet did not run aground).

From Cabo Hermoso, Columbus described a "great bight" to the northeast. Further confusing the issue, Columbus then says that he believes Cabo Hermoso is on a separate island from Samoete. The following morning (20 October), he tried to enter the bight in order to circumnavigate the island. That attempt soon proved futile because it was too shallow, and Columbus reversed course and returned to the northern end, awaiting the arrival of the King which his kidnapped native guides had told him about.

After two days of fruitless waiting for the King and another day becalmed, Columbus departed from the northern end of Island IV at midnight on 24 October, setting his sights on Cuba, the large island to the south he had been told about. He sailed WSW until dawn on the 24th, then was becalmed again until noon, making scant progress in the afternoon. At some point, he fixed his position at seven leagues southeast of Cape Verde, which he describes as being "in the western part of the southern part" of Island III. From that point, he made two leagues on a doubtful course under a rising wind; then, the morning of 25 October, he made five leagues WSW and another 11 leagues west when they sighted the Ragged Islands, which he called the Islas de Arena ("Sand Islands") running north–south at a distance of five leagues.

== Candidates ==
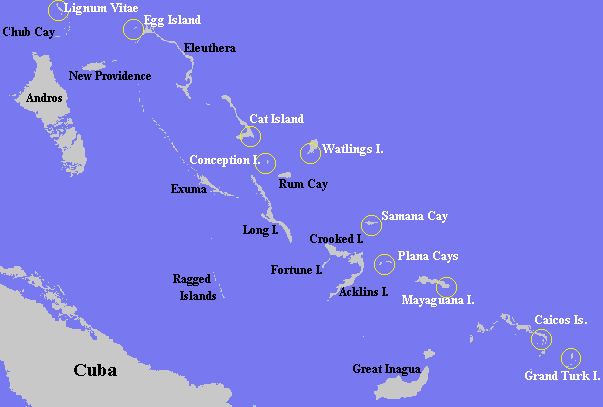
Landfall theories

- Modern San Salvador Island was known since the 17th century as Watlings Island but renamed in 1925 after historians identified it as Guanahani. This hypothesis was proposed by Juan Bautista Muñoz (1793). It was resurrected by A. B. Becher (1856) and forwarded strongly by Lt. Joseph B. Murdock (1884). Supporters of the theory include the influential historians Richard Henry Major (1871) and Samuel Eliot Morison (1942). It remains widely accepted as the most probable candidate. However, Keith Pickering argues that Watlings Island is among the least probable, and that it is only widely accepted because it was seen as superior to previous 19th century theories.
- Samana Cay, proposed in 1880 by Gustavus V. Fox, a U.S. Navy captain. Fox's theory was little known until revived in a 1986 issue of National Geographic Magazine.
- Plana Cays, proposed by Ramón Julio Didiez Burgos in 1974 and Pickering in 1994. Pickering argues that the Plana Cays "has fewer and less serious problems than any of the others -- in some cases, a lot fewer."
- Grand Turk Island, proposed by Martín Fernández de Navarrete in 1825, but soon fell out of favor until it was resurrected by Robert Power in 1924.
- Cat Island was long believed to be Guanahani as identified on many nautical charts from the 18th century. In light of the competing new theories of Muñoz and Fernández de Navarrete, Washington Irving (1828), with the assistance of Alexander Slidell Mackenzie, set out the case for Cat Island, supported by Alexander von Humboldt (1837). The hypothesis lost traction after the publication of Bartolomé de las Casas' abstract of Columbus' on-board journal (1875–1876), which argued strongly against it.
- Mayaguana, proposed by Francisco Adolfo de Varnhagen in 1864.
- Conception Island, proposed by Rupert Gould in 1943.
- East Caicos, proposed by Pieter Verhoog in 1947.
- Egg Island, proposed by Arne Molander in 1981.
- Lignum Vitae Cay, proposed by John H. Winslow in 1989.

== See also ==
- Columbian Exchange
