= Bike MS: City to Shore Ride =

The Bike MS: City to Shore Ride is 1 or 2–day ride held in South Jersey. The ride starts at the PATCO Woodcrest Station in Cherry Hill and finishes at the Ocean City High School in Ocean City, New Jersey. Riders also have the option to start in Hammonton or Mays Landing, New Jersey. The ride's purpose is to raise money for multiple sclerosis, a chronic disease that affects the central nervous system.

Started in 1980, the City to Shore Tour attracts over 7,000 cyclists of all ages and cycling abilities for up to 175 miles (282 km) of cycling. The event was canceled for the first time in 2015, due to the threat from Hurricane Joaquin.

== History ==
In October 2015, the threat of Hurricane Joaquin prompted New Jersey governor Chris Christie to declare a state of emergency. As a result, the planners of the biking event canceled the ride for the first time in its 35 year history. The large scale of the event precluded the possibility of postponing, although the 2015 ride raised nearly $4.4 million by the time it was cancelled.

The 2020 event was cancelled due to the COVID-19 pandemic.

== Description ==
Day One (Saturday) options include 25, 45, 75 mile routes. For ambitious riders who choose the 75-mile (121 km) route, there is a 25-mile (40 km) loop which can be added to the ride to make it a full century (100 miles).

At the finish line, a variety of events are held on the boardwalk in Ocean City, one of the most popular family vacation spots in the United States.

Day Two (Sunday) is limited to riders who choose to ride the 75 miles back to Cherry Hill.

The terrain for this tour is predominantly flatland in South Jersey.

The Bike Tour cyclists pay a fee to register and can ride as in individual or in a team. All riders must raise a minimum of $300 in donations. All of the donations received go to the National MS Society for research to find a cure for multiple sclerosis, and provide services for the 11,000 local people living with the disease.

The ride is fully supported with catered rest stops, bicycle mechanics, and support and gear (SAG) vehicles for all riders.

Route options:

- One-day 25-miles
- One-day 50-miles
- One-day 75-miles
- One-day 100-miles
- Two-day 75-miles each day
- Two-day 75-miles each day plus 25-mile extra loop (scenic century)

== See also ==
- Bicycle touring
- Bike MS
