= Antilles Current =

Ocean current

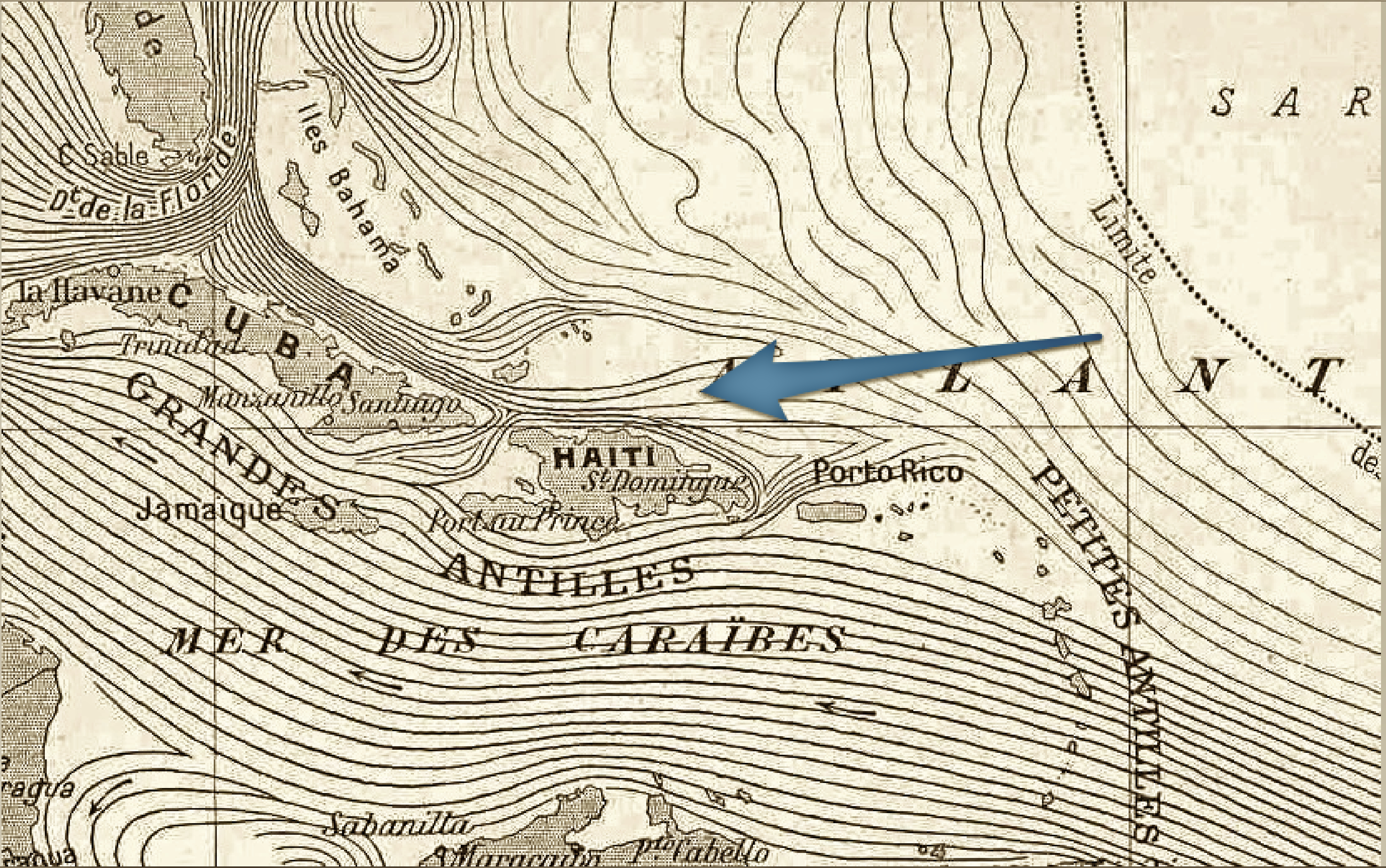
Antilles Current, an arm of the North Atlantic Gyre

The Antilles Current is a highly variable surface ocean current of warm water that flows northwesterly, past the island chain that separates the Caribbean Sea and the Atlantic Ocean. The current results from the flow of the Atlantic North Equatorial Current. This current completes the clockwise- cycle or convection (North Atlantic Gyre) that is located in the Atlantic Ocean. It runs north of Puerto Rico, Hispaniola and Cuba, but south to the Bahamas, facilitating maritime communication from across the Atlantic into these islands' northern coasts, and connecting to the Gulf Stream at the intersection of the Florida Strait. Because of its non-dominant pace and rich-nutrient waters, fishermen across the Caribbean Islands use it to fish. It moves almost parallel to the also rich-nutrient Caribbean Current which flows south of Puerto Rico and Cuba, and over Colombia and Venezuela.

== See also ==
- North Equatorial Current – Current in the Pacific and Atlantic Oceans
- Ocean current – Directional mass flow of oceanic water
- Oceanic gyres – Any large system of circulating ocean surface currents
