= Samana Cay =

Island in The Bahamas

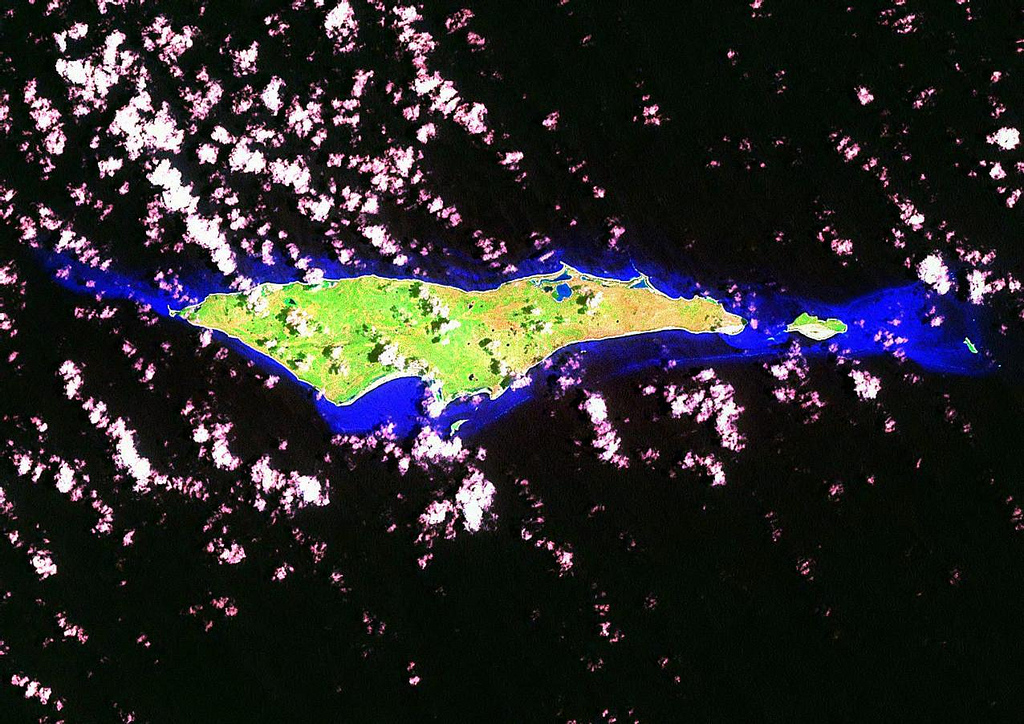
- Landsat Image of Samana Cay and White Cay, Bahamas

- Location within Bahamas

Geography
- Location: Atlantic Ocean
- Coordinates: 23°05′N 73°45′W
- Type: Cay
- Archipelago: Lucayan Archipelago

Administration
- Bahamas

Additional information
- Time zone: EST (UTC-5)
  - Summer (DST): EDT (UTC-4)
- ISO code: BS-CK

Samana Cay is an uninhabited island in the southeastern portion of The Bahamas. It is considered by some researchers to have been the location of Christopher Columbus's first landfall in the Americas on October 12, 1492.

It is a cay in the eastern Bahamas, 22 miles (35 km) northeast of Acklins Island. About 10 miles (16 km) long and up to 2 miles (3 km) wide with an area of about 17 square miles (45 km^{2}) it is bound by reefs. The verdant cay has long been uninhabited, but figurines, pottery shards, and other artifacts discovered there in the mid-1980s have been ascribed to Lucayan Indians, who lived on the cay around the time of Columbus's voyages.

The Indigenous Lucayan people of the island on which Columbus first landed called it "Guanahani." Samana Cay was first proposed to be Guanahani by Gustavus Fox in 1882, but the predominant theory gives the honour to San Salvador Island. However, in 1986, Joseph Judge of National Geographic Magazine made different calculations based on extracts from Columbus's logs and argued for Samana Cay as the location, but his methodology has also been criticised.

Samana was a name of apparent Lucayan origin (meaning "small middle forested land") used by the Spanish to designate one of the islands in the Bahamas. Granberry and Vesceliuus identify that island as the present-day Samana Cay.

Samana Cay had a permanent population during the first half of the 20th century, and the ruins of the settlement are visible on the south side of the island, near the western end. The island is now uninhabited, but residents of nearby Acklins Island visit occasionally to collect cascarilla bark, which grows in abundance on the island.
