= Spring Point, Bahamas =

Spring Point
- Location of Spring Point in the Bahamas
- Coordinates: 22°26′N 73°59′W
- Country: Bahamas
- Island: Acklins
- District: Acklins

Population (2010)
  - Total: 36
- Time zone: UTC-5 (Eastern Time Zone)
- Area code: 242

Spring Point is a town in Acklins, Bahamas and serves as its capital. As of 2010, it had a population of 36.

This town's primary transport methods are boat and airplane, with Spring Point Airport serving its area.
