= Spring Point Airport =

- IATA: AXP; ICAO: MYAP

Summary
- Airport type: Public
- Serves: Spring Point, Acklins Island, Bahamas
- Elevation AMSL: 11 ft / 3 m
- Coordinates: 22°26′31″N 073°58′15″W

Map
- Location in The Bahamas

Runways
Direction	Length		Surface
Direction	m	ft	Surface
13/31	1,524	5,000	Asphalt
- Source: DAFIF

Spring Point Airport (IATA: AXP, ICAO: MYAP) is an airport serving Spring Point on Acklins Island in The Bahamas. Bahamasair flies to Spring Point Airport, and it is the only airline that flies here.

== Facilities ==
The airport resides at an elevation of 11 ft (3.4 m) above mean sea level. It has one runway designated 13/31 with an asphalt surface measuring 1,524 m × 46 m (5,000 ft × 151 ft).

== Airlines and destinations ==
Airlines	Destinations
Bahamasair	Colonel Hill, Nassau
