= Acklins =

Island in The Bahamas

Geography
- Location: Atlantic Ocean; 385 km (239 mi) Southeast of Nassau
- Coordinates: 22°27′N 73°57′W
- Archipelago: Bahamas
- Area: 389 km^{2} (150 sq mi)

Administration
- Bahamas

Demographics
- Population: 692 (2022)

Acklins is an island and district of the Bahamas.

It is one of a group of islands arranged along a large, shallow lagoon called the Bight of Acklins, of which the largest are Crooked Island (200 km^{2} or 76 sq mi) in the north and Acklins (310 km^{2} or 120 sq mi) in the southeast, and the smaller are Long Cay (once known as Fortune Island, (21 km^{2} or 8 sq mi)) in the northwest, and Castle Island in the south.

== Etymology ==
The indigenous Lucayan people called the Acklins as Yabaque, meaning "large western land".

== History ==
The islands were settled by American Loyalists in the late 1780s who set up cotton plantations maintained by over 1,000 slaves. After the abolition of slavery in the British Empire, the plantations became uneconomical, and the replacement income from sponge diving has now dwindled along with the rest of the natural sponge industry after the advent of synthetics. The inhabitants now live by fishing and small-scale farming.

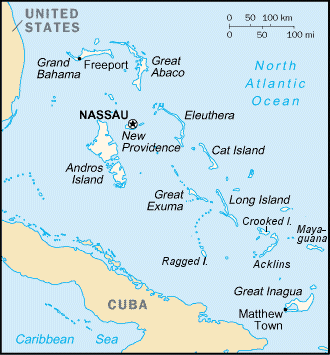
Map of the Bahamas

Although Acklins Island has relatively few historical landmarks, there are some noteworthy places. Acklins is home to numerous Lucayan sites. An ancient site, thought to be one of the largest Lucayan settlements in The Bahamas, sits along Pompey Bay Beach, just south of Spring Point. Ten ancient Lucayan sites have been unearthed by National Geographic Society archeologists on Samana Cay alone, which is northeast of Spring Point in Acklins.

Plana Cays, also northeast of Spring Point, is a protected reserve for endangered great iguanas and the very rare Bahamian hutia (a guinea pig-like rodent), the only native mammal of The Bahamas.

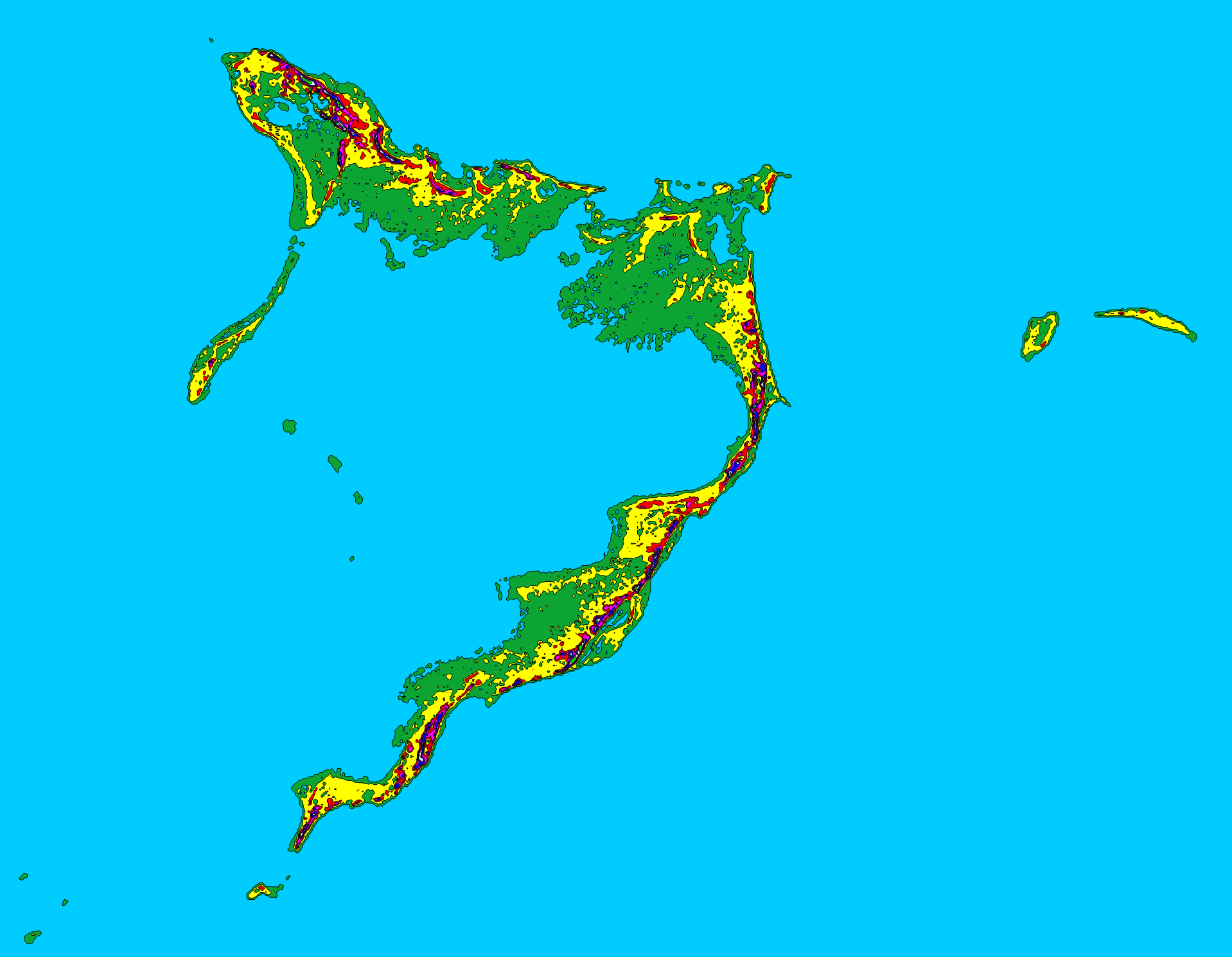
Topographic map of Acklins Island and Crooked Island.

The population of Acklins was 565 at the 2010 census, with the largest populations at Lovely Bay in the northwestern tip of the island and in Salina Point in the southernmost area of the island.

== Transportation ==
The island is served by Spring Point Airport.

== Politics ==
The island is part of the MICAL constituency for elections to the House of Assembly of the Bahamas.
