= Transport in the Bahamas =

This article talks about transportation in the Bahamas, a North American archipelagic state in the Atlantic Ocean.

== Roadways ==
Approximately 2,718 kilometres (1,689 mi) of road in the Bahamas is classified as highway. Of these, approximately 1,560 kilometres (970 mi) are paved. Drivers drive on the left. Golf carts are common in certain low traffic residential communities, resorts, and shopping areas away from main roads.

The Sustainable Nassau Action Plan published a report in 2022 suggesting the number of new cars on New Providence over course of the 2010s outpaced population growth, and urged officials to take measures to move away from car dependency and car-oriented development, and decrease congestion.

== Public transport ==
=== Busses ===
Privately operated licensed jitneys are the main mode of public transport and way to get around at a low cost, with rides ranging from $1 to 3. Bus stops typically contain a bench shaded by a yellow and white kiosk. Jitneys can be identified by the route and number displayed on the vehicle.

In 2017, the government launched a pilot programme to unify the different routes under one bus system among other improvements such as clearer signage and timetables.

In 2023, the Bahamas Unified Public Transportation Company (UPTC) and Bluestone Labs will roll out a unified ridesharing-style digital system. The new UPTC Jitney Pass, available through the Bluestone B-ID app, will cover over 40 routes, provide a routing system and live updates, and eventually phase out cash payments. UPTC president Harrison Moxey stated in February 2023 that the dispatch centre was near completion.

=== Taxis and shuttles ===
For those who do not own or rent a car, taxis with capped fares are available. Many hotels and resorts have their own shuttle services to the airport, beach (if they are not directly on a beach), and other destinations.

== Waterways ==
=== Ferries ===
Ferry and water taxi services are found throughout the Bahamas, particularly services that operate between New Providence and the Out Islands. Other ferries connect Downtown Nassau to Paradise Island; Great Abaco to its nearby cays; Acklins, Crooked Island and Long Cay; and South Bimini Airport to North Bimini's resort town. There are also water taxi services in the Exumas.

=== Ports and harbours ===
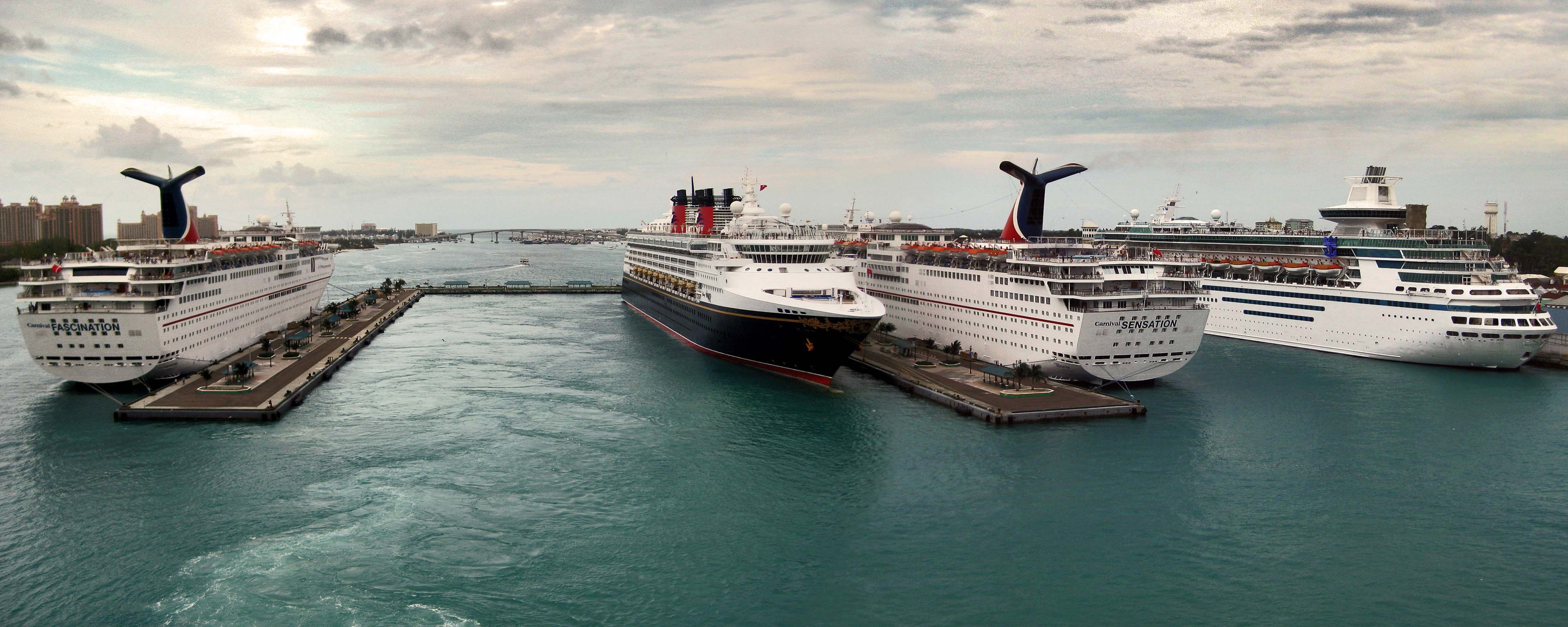
Cruise ships at Nassau's Prince George Wharf.

Marinas and harbours are plentiful on The Bahamas islands, making aquatic travel an easy way to navigate between the islands group. Boat travel can be the only way to reach some of the smaller islands. Travelers entering the island will need to clear customs first, but boatsmen can enter any of the following ports of entry and harbours in The Bahamas:

- Abaco Islands: Green Turtle Cay, Marsh Harbour, Spanish Cay, Treasure Cay, or Walker's Cay
- Berry Islands: Chub Cay and Great Harbour Cay
- Bimini: Alice Town
- Cat Cays: Hawksnest Marina
- Eleuthera: Governor's Harbour, Harbour Island, Rock Sound, or Spanish Wells
- Exuma: George Town
- Grand Bahama Island: Freeport Harbour, Lucayan Marina Village and Port Lucaya, or Old Bahama Bay at West End
- Inagua: Matthew Town
- Long Island: Stella Maris Airport
- Mayaguana: Abraham's Bay
- Nassau/New Providence Island: Any marina
- San Salvador: Cockburn Town

Facilities catering to large passenger cruise ships are located on Grand Bahama Island and New Providence. The Lucayan Harbour Cruise Facility in Freeport and Nassau harbour's Prince George Wharf are built specifically to handle multiple modern cruise ships at one time. Additionally, several major cruise line corporations have each purchased an uninhabited island which they now operate as private island destinations available exclusively to their respective ships. These include Great Stirrup Cay, owned by Norwegian Cruise Line, Little Stirrup Cay otherwise known as Royal Caribbean International's "Coco Cay", Carnival Corporation's Little San Salvador Island or "Half Moon Cay", and Castaway Cay, of Disney Cruise Line. Of these, only Castaway Cay offers ships an actual pier for docking. The others use tender boats to service ships anchored off shore.

=== Merchant marine ===
Total: 1,440 (2017 - CIA World Factbook) By type: bulk carrier 335, container ship 53, general cargo 98, oil tanker 284, other 670 (2017)

The Bahamas are one of the world's top five flag of convenience shipping registries.

== Airports ==
The main airports on the islands are Lynden Pindling International Airport on New Providence, Grand Bahama International Airport on Grand Bahama Island, and Marsh Harbour International Airport on Abaco Island. Out of 62 airports in all, 23 have paved runways, of which there are two that are over 3,047 meters long.

Airports with paved runways:

total: 23
over 3,047 m: 2
2,438 to 3,047 m: 4
1,524 to 2,437 m: 11
914 to 1,523 m: 6 (2008)

Airports with unpaved runways:

total: 39
1,524 to 2,437 m: 5
914 to 1,523 m: 12
under 914 m: 22 (2008)

=== Airlines ===
Bahamasair is the national flag carrier airline of the Bahamas.

=== Heliports ===
A heliport is located on Paradise Island, as well as other smaller islands, such as the various cruise line private islands.

== Railways ==
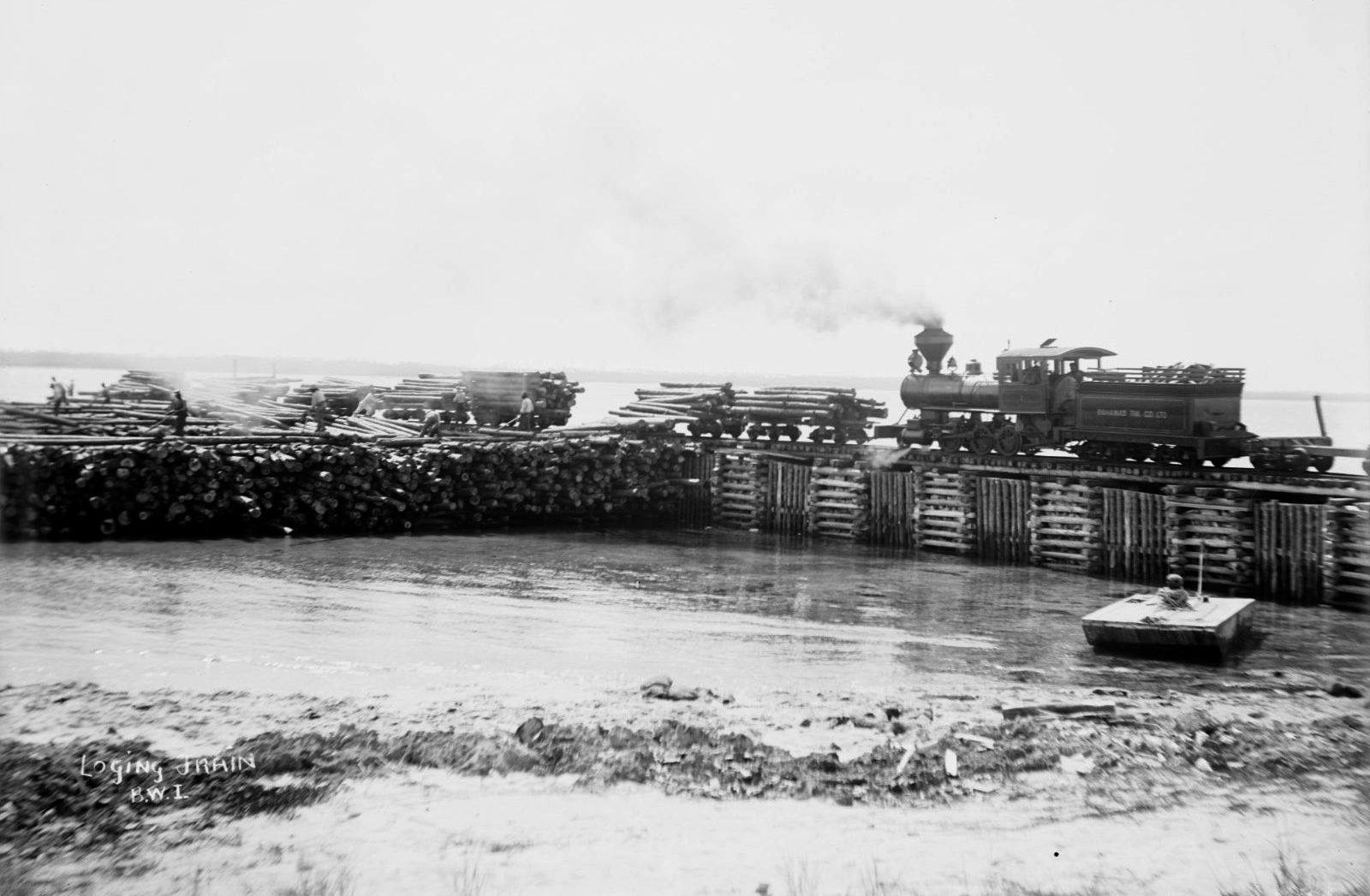
Locomotive circling log pond in Wilson City, 1905

There are no currently functioning railways in the Bahamas. However, there have been a few in the past including in Inagua, Abaco, and Grand Bahama used for the salt and logging industries.

At Wilson City, Abaco, a mill plant and adjacent town was developed by the Bahamas Timber Company at a cost of around $1 million, including building 12 miles of railway for logging. They operated three locomotives: a Vulcan 2-6-0, a Vulcan 0-4-4 tank, and a shay locomotive built at Lima Locomotive Works in Ohio. Along with the three locomotives, the company invested in almost 60 logging cars to carry the logs from the Forrest. Each train consisted of about 20 log cars. After Wilson City shut down at the end of World War I, Abaco was extensively logged by the Bahamas Cuban company until 1944, when they moved to Pineridge, Grand Bahama.

There were 5 camps on Abaco operated by the Bahamas Cuban Company. Norman’s Castle, Millville, Cornwall 1 and 2, and Cross Harbour. They used 4 narrow gauge locomotives produced by the Climax locomotive works. At the last 4 camps, causeways were built so that the rail lines could reach the shore, over the vast expanses of swamp and mangroves. After the sinking of the Norwegian tanker O.A. Knudsen, the survivors were transported to the Cross harbour camp via locomotive so that they could receive medical attention. One sailor, Olaus Johansen, died and was buried at the camp. Once the operation moved and the site was abandoned, his grave was forgotten and was lost for many years.

In Inagua, the Morton salt company used small Brookville diesel locomotives to pull trains of salt around the area. The locomotives were phased out eventually, but the tracks remained for a few more years before being removed due to contamination issued with the salt.

There have been a handful of smaller railways that operated without locomotives, built for the purpose of transporting salt, sisal, and agricultural produce. These existed in Abaco, Exuma, Inagua (Inagua tramways, 1860s), and New Providence. In Abaco there were two short railways built, one at Cedar harbour and one at a plantation near a large blue hole on Little Abaco.

One of these were in Cat Island; the remnants of a short section of (now underwater) track can still be seen from the shore. The railroad was built in the 19th century to carry produce from Old Bight to a port where crops would be shipped to Europe and the US, and was closed when the US stopped foreign exports and plantations were no longer in use. The tracks were subsequently sent to the UK to be repurposed into scrap metal for weapons during World War II.
