= List of lighthouses in the Bahamas =

This is a list of lighthouses in the Bahamas.

== Abaco Islands ==
| Name | Image | Year built | Location & coordinates | Class of Light | Focal height | NGA number | Admiralty number | Range nml |
|---|---|---|---|---|---|---|---|---|
| Elbow Reef Lighthouse | | 1864 | Hope Town; 26°32′23.3″N 76°57′43.4″W | Fl (5) W 15s. | 37 metres (121 ft) | 11800 | J4572 | 23 |
| Hole-in-the-Wall Lighthouse | | 1836 | Little Harbour; 25°51′41.9″N 77°11′01.4″W | Fl W 10s. | 51 metres (167 ft) | 11816 | J4580 | 23 |
| Little Harbour Lighthouse | Image | 1889 est. | Little Harbour; 26°19′49.2″N 76°59′43.5″W | Fl W 4s. | 19 metres (62 ft) | 11808 | J4576 | 10 |

== Acklins ==
| Name | Image | Year built | Location & coordinates | Class of Light | Focal height | NGA number | Admiralty number | Range nml |
|---|---|---|---|---|---|---|---|---|
| Castle Island Lighthouse | Image | 1868 | Castle Island; 22°07′35.1″N 74°19′42.0″W | Fl (2) W 20s. | 40 metres (130 ft) | 12324 | J4782 | 22 |

== Andros Island ==
| Name | Image | Year built | Location | Coordinates | Status | Tower height | ARLHS number |
|---|---|---|---|---|---|---|---|
| Coakley Town Lighthouse | | 1895 | Andros Town | 24°43′31.1″N 77°46′59.0″W | inactive | 9 metres (30 ft) | BAH-017 |

== Berry Islands ==
| Name | Image | Year built | Location & coordinates | Class of Light | Focal height | NGA number | Admiralty number | Range nml |
|---|---|---|---|---|---|---|---|---|
| Great Stirrup Cay Lighthouse | | 1863 | Great Stirrup Cay; 25°49′24.7″N 77°54′03.1″W | Fl (2) W 20s. | 25 metres (82 ft) | 11940 | J4624 | 22 |
| Whale Point Lighthouse | Image | 1920 | Whale Cay; 25°23′41.7″N 77°48′01.2″W | Fl W 4s. look inactive | 21 metres (69 ft) | 11952 | J4626 | 7 |

== Bimini ==
| Name | Image | Year built | Location & coordinates | Class of Light | Focal height | NGA number | Admiralty number | Range nml |
|---|---|---|---|---|---|---|---|---|
| Great Isaac Cay Lighthouse | | 1859 | Great Isaac Cay; 26°01′47.1″N 79°05′4.5″W | Fl W 15s. | 46 metres (151 ft) | 11900 | J4620 | 23 |
| Gun Cay Lighthouse | | 1836 | South Bimini; 25°34′24.4″N 79°17′48.0″W | Fl W 10s. | 24 metres (79 ft) | 11916 | J4610 | 15 |
| North Cat Cay breakwater Lighthouse | Image | 1933 | North Cat Cays; 25°33′22.5″N 79°16′37.7″W | Fl W 2s. | 3 metres (9.8 ft) | 11920 | J4608 | 5 |
| North Rock Lighthouse | | n/a | offshore North Bimini; 25°47′54.8″N 79°15′27.0″W | Fl W 3s. | 6 metres (20 ft) | 11904 | J4616 | 5 |
| South Riding Rock Lighthouse | | n/a | South Bimini; 25°15′45.2″N 79°08′56.7″W | Fl W 5s. | 11 metres (36 ft) | 11924 | J4604 | 11 |

== Cay Sal Bank ==
| Name | Image | Year built | Location | Coordinates | Status | Tower height | ARLHS number |
|---|---|---|---|---|---|---|---|
| Cay Sal Lighthouse | | 1839 | Elbow Cays | 23°57′12.6″N 80°26′42.0″W | inactive since 1940s | 18 metres (59 ft) | BAH-018 |

== Crooked Island ==
| Name | Image | Year built | Location & coordinates | Class of Light | Focal height | NGA number | Admiralty number | Range nml |
|---|---|---|---|---|---|---|---|---|
| Bird Rock Lighthouse | Image | 1876 | Crooked Island; 22°50′43.1″N 74°21′35.1″W | Fl (2) W 15s. | 34 metres (112 ft) | 12296 | J4792 | 22 |
| Windsor Point Lighthouse | | n/a | Long Cay; 22°33′06.1″N 74°22′27.1″W | Fl W 3s. | 11 metres (36 ft) | 12320 | J4788 | 8 |

== Eleuthera ==
| Name | Image | Year built | Location & coordinates | Class of Light | Focal height | NGA number | Admiralty number | Range nml |
|---|---|---|---|---|---|---|---|---|
| Egg Island Lighthouse | Image | 1891 est. | Egg Island; 25°29′59.9″N 76°52′46.8″W | Fl W 3s. | 34 metres (112 ft) | 12200 | J4678 | 12 |
| Eleuthera Point Lighthouse | Image | 1903 est. | Eleuthera; 24°36′55.1″N 76°08′45.8″W | Fl W 4.6s. | 19 metres (62 ft) | 12208 | J4704 | 6 |
| Man Island Lighthouse | | n/a | Man Island; 25°32′48.0″N 76°38′30.0″W | FI(3) W 15s | 28 metres (92 ft) | 12204 | J4682 | 12 |
| North Palmetto Point Lighthouse | Image | 1992 | Eleuthera; 25°10′49.0″N 76°11′24.2″W | FF(1) W 5s | 22 metres (72 ft) | 12158 | J4705 | 12 |
| Powell Point Lighthouse | | n/a | Eleuthera; 24°50′21.7″N 76°20′36.9″W | Fl W 3s. | 12 metres (39 ft) | 12140 | J4700 | 8 |
| Six Shilling Cay Lighthouse | | n/a | Eleuthera; 25°16′23.0″N 76°54′27.3″W | Fl W 8s. | 10 metres (33 ft) | 12172 | J4674 | 10 |
| Cupid Cay Lighthouse | Image | n/a | Governor's Harbour; 25°11′37.0″N 76°15′06.7″W | Fl W 4s. | 12 metres (39 ft) | 12160 | J4692 | 8 |

== Exuma Sound ==
| Name | Image | Year built | Location & coordinates | Class of Light | Focal height | NGA number | Admiralty number | Range nml |
|---|---|---|---|---|---|---|---|---|
| Bennett's Harbor Lighthouse | | n/a | Cat Island; 24°33′35.5″N 75°38′21.2″W | Fl W 4s. | 16 metres (52 ft) | 12220 | J4712 | 12 |
| Cape St. Maria Lighthouse | | n/a | Long Island; 23°40′33.3″N 75°20′27.2″W | Fl W 3.3s. | 30 metres (98 ft) | 12260 | J4750 | 14 |
| Devils Point Lighthouse | | n/a | Cat Island; 24°07′19.0″N 75°27′53.5″W | Fl W 5s. | 44 metres (144 ft) | 12236 | J4718 | 12 |
| Exuma Harbor Lighthouse | | n/a | Exuma; 23°33′31.6″N 75°48′12.3″W | Fl W 5s. | 12 metres (39 ft) | 12244 | J4734 | 8 |
| Jewfish Cut Lighthouse | | n/a | Exuma; 23°27′12.7″N 75°57′21.6″W | Fl W 2.5s. | 12 metres (39 ft) | 12256 | J4736 | 8 |
| Little San Salvador Lighthouse | | n/a | Little San Salvador Island; 24°33′47.3″N 75°56′02.3″W | Fl W 2.4s. | 21 metres (69 ft) | 12212 | J4708 | 13 |
| Dixon Hill Lighthouse | | n/a | San Salvador Island; 24°05′51.8″N 74°27′05.1″W | Fl (2) W 10s. | 50 metres (160 ft) | 12288 | J4738 | 23 |
| South Point Lighthouse | | n/a | Long Island; 22°51′29.8″N 74°51′19.7″W | Fl W 2.5s. | 19 metres (62 ft) | 12280 | J4758 | 12 |

== Grand Bahama ==
| Name | Image | Year built | Location & coordinates | Class of Light | Focal height | NGA number | Admiralty number | Range nml |
|---|---|---|---|---|---|---|---|---|
| Freeport West Breakwater Lighthouse | Image | n/a | Freeport; 26°31′06.6″N 78°46′40.8″W | Fl G 4s. | 7 metres (23 ft) | 11864 | J4596 | 6 |
| High Rock Lighthouse | | n/a | East Grand Bahama; 26°37′17.5″N 78°16′52.0″W | F W | 8 metres (26 ft) | 11836 | J4589 | 6 |
| Indian Cay Lighthouse | | n/a | West End; 26°43′03.0″N 79°00′05.5″W | Fl W 6s. | 12 metres (39 ft) | 11892 | J4600 | 8 |
| Memory Rock Lighthouse | | n/a | Grand Bahama; 26°57′01.8″N 79°06′12.9″W | Fl W 3s. | 11 metres (36 ft) | 11896 | J4602 | 11 |
| Pinder Point Range Front Lighthouse | | n/a | Freeport; 26°31′54.7″N 78°46′14.3″W | F G | 81 metres (266 ft) | 11880 | J4595 | 11 |
| Pinder Point Range Rear Lighthouse | | n/a | Freeport; 26°32′29.8″N 78°45′58.7″W | F G | 81 metres (266 ft) | 11884 | J4595.1 | 11 |
| Sweetings Cay Lighthouse | | n/a | Grand Bahama; 26°36′41.4″N 77°53′45.0″W | Fl W 6s. | 7 metres (23 ft) | 11832 | J4584 | 8 |

== Inagua ==
| Name | Image | Year built | Location & coordinates | Class of Light | Focal height | NGA number | Admiralty number | Range nml |
|---|---|---|---|---|---|---|---|---|
| Great Inagua Lighthouse | | 1870 | Matthew Town; 20°56′00.7″N 73°40′27.4″W | Fl (2) W 10s. | 37 metres (121 ft) | 12360 | J4804 | 22 |

== Jumentos Cays ==
| Name | Image | Year built | Location & coordinates | Class of Light | Focal height | NGA number | Admiralty number | Range nml |
|---|---|---|---|---|---|---|---|---|
| Cay Lobos Lighthouse | | 1869 | Cay Lobos; 22°22′47.3″N 77°35′10.2″W | Fl (2) W 20s. | 44 metres (144 ft) | 12344 | J4774 | 22 |
| Man-O-War Hill Lighthouse | | n/a | Ragged Island; 22°11′13.7″N 75°43′26.4″W | Fl W 3s. | 36 metres (118 ft) | 12336 | J4768 | 12 |
| Nuevitas Rock Lighthouse | | n/a | offshore Long Island; 23°09′31.9″N 75°22′25.4″W | F W 4s. | 12 metres (39 ft) | 12328 | J4764 | 10 |

== Mayaguana ==
| Name | Image | Year built | Location & coordinates | Class of Light | Focal height | NGA number | Admiralty number | Range nml |
|---|---|---|---|---|---|---|---|---|
| Guano Point Lighthouse | | n/a | Abraham's Bay; 22°21′16.2″N 72°57′58.3″W | Fl W 3s. | 4 metres (13 ft) | 12348 | J4800 | 8 |
| Hogsty Reef Lighthouse | Image | n/a | Hogsty Reef; 21°41′37.2″N 73°50′50.2″W | Fl W 4s. | 9 metres (30 ft) | 12356 | J4804 | 8 |
| Northwest Point Lighthouse | | n/a | Mayaguana; 22°27′23.0″N 73°07′47.4″W | Fl W 5s. | 21 metres (69 ft) | 12352 | J4798 | 12 |

== New Providence ==
| Name | Image | Year built | Location & coordinates | Class of Light | Focal height | NGA number | Admiralty number | Range nml |
|---|---|---|---|---|---|---|---|---|
| Clifton Terminal Lighthouse | | | Nassau; 25°00′22.0″N 77°32′35.2″W | 2 Q R | 37 metres (121 ft) | 12144 | J4670.8 | 13 |
| East End Point Lighthouse | Image | 1909 | Nassau; 25°01′57.3″N 77°15′31.4″W | Fl W 6s. | 17 metres (56 ft) | 12112 | J4669 | 8 |
| Fort Fincastle Lighthouse | | 1928 | Nassau; 25°04′23.3″N 77°20′16.8″W | Fl W 5s. | 67 metres (220 ft) | 12080 | J4654 | 28 |
| Goulding Cay Lighthouse | Image | 1922 est. | Goulding Cay; 25°01′15.6″N 77°34′17.1″W | Fl W 2s. | 11 metres (36 ft) | 12076 | J4650 | 8 |
| Government House Light | | n/a | Nassau; 25°04′32.6″N 77°20′40.6″W | Fl R 3s. | 37 metres (121 ft) | 12096 | J4658 | 10 |
| Paradise Island Lighthouse | | 1817 | Nassau; 25°05′13.0″N 77°21′05.2″W | Fl W 5s. | 21 metres (69 ft) | 12084 | J4655 | 13 |
| Porgee Rocks Lighthouse | | n/a | offshore Nassau; 25°03′58.4″N 77°14′37.7″W | Fl W 3s. | 8 metres (26 ft) | 12104 | J4668 | 5 |

== See also ==
- Transport in the Bahamas
- Lighthouse
- Lists of lighthouses
