= List of shipwrecks in June 1864 =

The list of shipwrecks in June 1864 includes ships sunk, foundered, grounded, or otherwise lost during June 1864.

== 1 June ==
List of shipwrecks: 1 June 1864
Ship	State	Description
Arthur	Russia	The full-rigged ship capsized at Lisbon, Portugal. Her crew were rescued.
Arthur McKenzie	(United Kingdom of Great Britain and Ireland) South Australia	The 227-ton brig went ashore while trying to cross the bar at Port Waikato, New Zealand.
Daring	(United Kingdom of Great Britain and Ireland) New Zealand	The schooner ran aground and sank at the mouth of the Waikato River. Subsequently refloated, repaired and returned to service.
Pocohontas	United States	The transport ship collided with the transport ship City of Bath (United States) and sank off Cape May, New Jersey with the loss of 40 lives.
William and Jane	United Kingdom	The ship sprang a leak and was beached at Lisbon, Portugal. She was on a voyage from Swansea, Glamorgan to Gibraltar. Following repairs, she was refloated on 6 June and subsequently resumed her voyage.
Unidentified wharf boat	United States	American Civil War: The wharf boat, loaded with reserve supplies and ammunition for the fleet of Rear Admiral David Dixon Porter (United States Navy) and carrying paymaster′s cash in a safe was set afire and blown up by Confederate agents on the Ohio River at Mound City, Illinois. The paymaster was burned and nearly suffocated while trying to save the cash in the safe.

== 2 June ==
List of shipwrecks: 2 June 1864
Ship	State	Description
Brothers	United Kingdom	The smack sprang a leak and sank off Strumble Head, Pembrokeshire. Her crew were rescued. She was on a voyage form Mochras, Caernarfonshire to Newport, Monmouthshire.
Dundalk	United Kingdom	American Civil War: The paddle steamer was driven ashore and wrecked at the Old Inlet, Wilmington, Delaware, United States by USS Victoria (United States Navy).
Frank Steel, or Frank Steele	United States	The 136-ton sidewheel paddle steamer exploded on the Mississippi River at La Crosse, Wisconsin, killing two people.
Georgiana C. McCaw	United Kingdom	American Civil War, Union blockade: Pursued by the gunboat USS Victoria (United States Navy), the 700-ton sidewheel paddle steamer, a blockade runner carrying a large cargo of provisions, ran aground near Cape Fear, North Carolina, Confederate States of America. USS Victoria shelled her, then put a boarding party aboard her which captured all but four of her passengers and crew and set her on fire. Her wreck eventually sank in 10 feet (3 m) of water.
Isabel	Confederate States of America	American Civil War, Union blockade: Having suffered severe damage from gunfire while being captured in the Gulf of Mexico off Galveston, Texas, by the screw steamer USS Admiral (United States Navy) while attempting to run the Union blockade with a cargo of gunpowder and arms on 28 May, the steamer sank at Quarantine Station on the Mississippi River.
Rose	United Kingdom	American Civil War, Union blockade: The 67-register ton sidewheel paddle steamer, a blockade runner en route from Nassau, Bahamas carrying a small cargo of liquor and other goods, was chased ashore on Pawleys Island, South Carolina, Confederate States of America by the gunboat USS Wamsutta (United States Navy). She was burned there by Union forces.
Scotia	(United Kingdom of Great Britain and Ireland) Victoria	The steamship ran aground and was wrecked at Bluff Harbour, New Zealand. She was on a voyage from Melbourne to Otago, New Zealand.
William and Jane	United Kingdom	The brigantine sprang a leak and was beached at Gibraltar.

== 3 June ==
List of shipwrecks: 3 June 1864
Ship	State	Description
Scotia	(United Kingdom of Great Britain and Ireland) New Zealand	The steamer went ashore at Bluff Harbour, on the final stretch of a voyage from Melbourne, Victoria while trying to cross the bar at Port Waikato.

== 4 June ==
List of shipwrecks: 4 June 1864
Ship	State	Description
Albion	United Kingdom	The barque was wrecked on the Lee Reef, off the coast of Jamaica.
Harmonie	Bremen	The ship foundered in the North Sea 10 nautical miles (19 km) off Vlieland, Friesland, Netherlands. She was on a voyage from Alloa, Clackmannanshire, United Kingdom to Bremen.
Maid of the Mill	United Kingdom	The ship was wrecked near Thisted, Denmark. Her crew were rescued. She was on a voyage from Blyth, Northumberland to Kronstadt, Russia.

== 5 June ==
List of shipwrecks: 5 June 1864
Ship	State	Description
Ellen	United Kingdom	The ship ran aground on the Carreg Long Rock, on the cost of Anglesey and sank. Her crew were rescued. She was on a voyage from Runcorn, Cheshire to Amlwch, Anglesey.
Nile	(United Kingdom of Great Britain and Ireland) New Zealand	The schooner ran aground at Takatu Point in the Hauraki Gulfon the final stretch of a voyage from Melbourne, Victoria while trying to cross the bar at Port Waikato.
Polly	Hamburg	The barque foundered off the Shetland Islands, United Kingdom. Confirmed by a message in a bottle which washed up in early August.

== 6 June ==
List of shipwrecks: 6 June 1864
Ship	State	Description
Robert Stephenson	United Kingdom	The brig was driven ashore at Copenhagen, Denmark. She was on a voyage from Riga, Russia to London.
Viscount Sandon	United Kingdom	The ship ran aground at Galle, Ceylon. She was on a voyage from Liverpool, Lancashire to Galle. She was refloated and taken in to Galle in a leaky condition.

== 7 June ==
List of shipwrecks: 7 June 1863
Ship	State	Description
CSS Etiwan	Confederate States Navy	American Civil War: The 132-ton sidewheel transport ran aground in Charleston Harbor off Fort Johnson, South Carolina. One source claims she was destroyed by Union artillery emplaced on Morris Island; another claims she was raised and repaired and placed in service by Union forces.
Paquete de Mayari	(Spain) Cuba	The schooner was wrecked on the Caicos Reef. She was on a voyage from Havana to Puerto Plata, Dominican Republic.
Thames	United Kingdom	The steamship ran aground on the Whitestone Rock, off Ryhope, County Durham. She was refloated and taken in to North Shields, Northumberland.
Two Brothers	United Kingdom	The schooner was wrecked on the Berner Rock, in the Orkney Islands. She was on a voyage from Bo'ness, Lothian to Great Yarmouth, Norfolk.

== 8 June ==
List of shipwrecks: 8 June 1864
Ship	State	Description
Berkshire	United States	The 649-ton steamer burned at Poughkeepsie, New York with the loss of 35 lives, there were more than 165 survivors. She was on a voyage from Hudson, New York to New York City.
Ganjam	United Kingdom	The ship was sighted whilst on a voyage from Akyab, Burma to Liverpool, Lancashire. No further trace, presumed foundered with the loss of all hands.
John Ellis	United Kingdom	The schooner was driven ashore on South Ronaldsay, Orkney Islands. She was refloated the next day and taken in to Stromness.
Orilla	United Kingdom	The barque ran aground at Taganrog, Russia She was on a voyage from Taganrog to South Shields, County Durham. She was refloated and resumed her voyage.

== 9 June ==
List of shipwrecks: 9 June 1864
Ship	State	Description
Augustus	Bremen	The full-rigged ship was driven ashore on North Ronaldsay, Orkney Islands, United Kingdom. All on board were rescued.
Chanaral	United Kingdom	The full-rigged ship was wrecked in Arica Bay. Her crew were rescued by the barque Perpetua, which lost four crew effecting the rescued.
John Bowes	United Kingdom	The collier, a steamship, ran aground on Heligoland. She was on a voyage from Newcastle upon Tyne, Northumberland to Hamburg. John Bowes was refloated but had to be beached. Following repairs, she resumed her voyage.
Pevensey	Confederate States of America	American Civil War, Union blockade: Pursued by the gunboat USS New Berne (United States Navy), the 483-, 500-, or 543-ton sidewheel paddle steamer, a blockade runner bound for Wilmington, North Carolina, from Bermuda with a cargo that included arms, blankets, cloth, clothing, shoes, lead, and bacon, ran aground on the coast of North Carolina about 7 miles (11 km) west of Beaufort. Pevensey′s crew blew her up and set her on fire to prevent her capture by Union forces.

== 10 June ==
List of shipwrecks: 10 June 1864
Ship	State	Description
Augusta	United Kingdom	The ship ran aground on the Cruden Scares. She was on a voyage from Inverness to Invergordon, Ross-shire. She was refloated and resumed her voyage.
Bob Chambers	United Kingdom	The steamship was destroyed by fire at Constantinople, Ottoman Empire.

== 11 June ==
List of shipwrecks: 11 June 1864
Ship	State	Description
Edouard and Jenny	Flag unknown	The ship was driven ashore at Ordness Head, Orkney Islands, United Kingdom. She was on a voyage from Stromness, Orkney Islands to Naples, Italy. She was refloated on 13 June and beached. She was taken in to Stromness for repairs on 3 September.
Jamaica Packet	(United Kingdom of Great Britain and Ireland) Jamaica	The steamship ran aground at Saint Ann's Bay. She was refloated and resumed her voyage to Kingston.

== 12 June ==
List of shipwrecks: 12 June 1864
Ship	State	Description
I Go	United States	American Civil War: The 104-ton sternwheel paddle steamer was burned on the Arkansas River at Arkansas Post, Arkansas.
Julius	United Kingdom	The ship sprang a leak and foundered in the Dogger Bank. Her crew were rescued by the steamship Luna (Hamburg).
USS Lavender	United States Navy	American Civil War, Union blockade: During a voyage from the Delaware Capes to Charleston, South Carolina, Confederate States of America, the armed tug was wrecked on the Cape Lookout Shoals off the coast of North Carolina, Confederate States of America during a severe squall. Between nine members and fourteen members of her crew died before the steamer John Farrow (United States Army) rescued her fourteen survivors on 15 June.
Spray	(United Kingdom of Great Britain and Ireland) New Zealand	The schooner hit rocks at the mouth of the Awanui River during a gale.

== 13 June ==
List of shipwrecks: 13 June 1864
Ship	State	Description
Brilliant	Prussia	The schooner was driven ashore on Eierland, North Holland, Netherlands. She was on a voyage from Liverpool, Lancashire, United Kingdom to Danzig.
Newcastle	United Kingdom	The steamship ran aground on Heligoland. She was on a voyage from Newcastle upon Tyne, Northumberland to Hamburg.
Sir George Grey	United Kingdom	The tug was run into by Helen Nicholson (United Kingdom) 7 nautical miles (13 km) west north west of Great Orme Head, Caernarfonshire and was severely damaged. She was beached at Tranmere, Cheshire.

== 14 June ==
List of shipwrecks: 14 June 1864
Ship	State	Description
USS Courier	United States Navy	The storeship was wrecked without loss of life on the Abaco Islands in the Bahamas about 10 nautical miles (19 km) south of the Elbow Cay Lighthouse.
Home	United States	The ship was driven ashore on Crane Island, Province of Canada British North America. She was refloated.
Lord Maidstone	United Kingdom	The ship was driven ashore on Crane Island. She was refloated.
Sunbeam	United Kingdom	The ship ran aground at "New Liverpool", Province of Canada. She was on a voyage from New Liverpool to Glasgow, Renfrewshire.

== 15 June ==
List of shipwrecks: 15 June 1864
Ship	State	Description
D. L. Choate	United States	The ship foundered with the loss of all but one of her crew. The survivor was rescued on 22 June by Imogen (United Kingdom). D. L. Choate was on a voyage from Bassein, India to Falmouth, Cornwall, United Kingdom.
J. R. Williams	United States	American Civil War: Disabled by Confederate artillery on the Arkansas River at Pheasant Bluff in the Indian Territory near what is now Tamaha, the sternwheel paddle steamer was shelled by artillery causing her to lose steam, she ran aground and was captured. Four Union soldiers were killed and several wounded. Confederate forces burned her the next day. See Ambush of the steamboat J. R. Williams.

== 16 June ==
List of shipwrecks: 16 June 1864
Ship	State	Description
Ballarat	(United Kingdom of Great Britain and Ireland) Victoria	The steamship was wrecked in Poverty Bay, New Zealand, during a heavy gale, while en route from Auckland to Napier. All on board were rescued.
Landis	United States	American Civil War: The 377-ton sidewheel transport was damaged in combat with the 1st Louisiana Cavalry Regiment (Confederate States Army) on the Mississippi River at Magnolia Landing, Louisiana, confederate States of America about 6 nautical miles (11 km) from Port Hudson on the night of 16 June and reportedly sank near Baton Rouge.
Nieuw Holland	Netherlands	The ship was destroyed by fire in the Atlantic Ocean. Her crew were rescued by Joan (Netherlands). Nieuw Holland was on a voyage from Amsterdam, North Holland to Batavia, Netherlands East Indies.
Two unidentified schooners	Unknown	American Civil War, Union blockade: The schooners were burned near the mouth of the Pamlico River in North Carolina, Confederate States of America by a joint Union Army-United States Navy expedition embarked on the transport Ella May (United States Army) and the sidewheel gunboat USS Ceres and armed screw steamer USS Louisiana (both United States Navy).

== 17 June ==
List of shipwrecks: 17 June 1864
Ship	State	Description
Bushire	(United Kingdom of Great Britain and Ireland) British North America	The ship was wrecked on the Ras Housun, near Aden. Her crew were rescued. She was on a voyage from Liverpool, Lancashire to Aden.
Fanny Merriman	(United Kingdom of Great Britain and Ireland) New South Wales	The ship was wrecked on Christmas Island. Her crew were rescued. She was on a voyage from San Francisco, California, United States to Sydney.
Lady of Portland	United Kingdom	The schooner foundered in the Mediterranean Sea off Málaga, Spain. Her crew were rescued. She was on a voyage from Agrigento, Sicily, Italy to Falmouth, Cornwall and/or the Mumbles, Glamorgan.
William C. Clarke	United States	American Civil War: The 338-ton brig, carrying a cargo of lumber from Machias, Maine, to Matanzas, Cuba, was captured and burned in the North Atlantic Ocean (30°00′N 62°40′W) by the screw sloop-of-war CSS Florida (Confederate States Navy).

== 18 June ==
List of shipwrecks: 18 June 1864
Ship	State	Description
HMS Tribune	Royal Navy	The Tribune-class frigate ran aground in the Fraser River at New Westminster, Colony of British Columbia. She was refloated on 24 June with assistance from HMS Forward, HMS Grappler and HMS Otter (all Royal Navy).

== 19 June ==
List of shipwrecks: 19 June 1864
Ship	State	Description
CSS Alabama	Confederate States Navy	Illustration of CSS Alabama sinking, Harper's Weekly, 23 July 1864. American Civil War, Battle of Cherbourg: The screw sloop-of-war was sunk in combat with the screw sloop-of-war USS Kearsarge (United States Navy) in the English Channel off Cherbourg, Seine-Inférieure, France with the loss of about 40 members of her crew. Kearsarge rescued approximately 70 members of her crew, who became prisoners-of-war.
Alvin Clark	United States	The schooner capsized and sank in a storm in Green Bay just off Chambers Island, Wisconsin, with the loss of two of her four crew.

== 21 June ==
List of shipwrecks: 21 June 1864
Ship	State	Description
Dnestr (Днестр, 'Dniester')	Imperial Russian Navy	The transport ship was driven ashore at the ru:Fort of Holy Spirit in the Black Sea. Her crew abandoned ship the next day, but returned and refloated her on 23 June. The corvette Krechet (Кречет, Imperial Russian Navy) towed her to Sevastopol by 28 June.
Mary Jane	United Kingdom	The full-rigged ship foundered in the Atlantic Ocean (34°52′N 30°53′W). A message in a bottle washed up at Campbeltown, Argyllshire in early September giving the news.
Richard Cobden	United Kingdom	The ship capsized at Liverpool, Lancashire. She was righted.
Volunteer	United Kingdom	The ship was driven ashore and damaged in the River Eske. She was on a voyage from Constanţa, Ottoman Empire to Donegal. She was refloated and taken in to Donegal in a severely leaky condition.

== 22 June ==
List of shipwrecks: 22 June 1864
Ship	State	Description
Illawarra	United Kingdom	The brig-rigged steamship struck a rock off Volcano Island and sank. She was on a voyage from Ningpo to Shanghai, China.
Royal Sovereign	United Kingdom	The ship struck a rock and sank in the Black Sea off Cape Takle, Russia. Her crew were rescued.

== 23 June ==
List of shipwrecks: 23 June 1864
Ship	State	Description
Isabella Peake	United Kingdom	The ship foundered off "Fort Soroa". Her crew were rescued. She was on a voyage from Bayonne, Loire-Inférieure, France to Jersey, Channel Islands.

== 24 June ==
List of shipwrecks: 24 June 1864
Ship	State	Description
Clan Gregor	United Kingdom	The ship was wrecked at Bonny, Africa. She was on a voyage from Liverpool, Lancashire to Bonny.
Eduardo	Italy	The brig was destroyed by fire at Baltimore, Maryland, United States.
Lady Eyre	United Kingdom	The ship was destroyed by fire in the Atlantic Ocean. Her crew were rescued. She was on a voyage from Liverpool, Lancashire to Bermuda.
Eleanor	United Kingdom	The brigantine ran aground in Stokes Bay. She was on a voyage from Sunderland, County Durham to Southampton, Hampshire. She had been refloated by 6 July with the assistance of a tug and towed in to Southampton.
Isabelle	United Kingdom	The schooner foundered off "Fort Swan". Her crew were rescued. She was on a voyage from Bayonne, Loire-Inférieure to Jersey, Channel Islands.
Minister von Bowes	Hamburg	The ship sprang a leak and foundered in the North Sea. Her crew were rescued by the schooner Spontea (United Kingdom). Minister von Bowes was on a voyage from Newcastle upon Tyne, Northumberland, United Kingdom.
USS Queen City	United States Navy	American Civil War, Union blockade: The sidewheel paddle steamer was captured by Confederate States Army cavalry and artillery while anchored on the White River off Clarendon, Arkansas. The Confederates blew her up shortly after capturing her.
Waverly	(United Kingdom of Great Britain and Ireland) New Zealand	The schooner went ashore after hitting rocks at Port Waikato. Her crew were rescued by the paddle steamer Sturt ( (United Kingdom of Great Britain and Ireland) New Zealand.

== 25 June ==
List of shipwrecks: 25 June 1864
Ship	State	Description
Cambrian	United Kingdom	The schooner foundered off the Crow Rock. Her crew were rescued. She was on a voyage from Cardiff, Glamorgan to Kinsale, County Cork.
Clangregor	United Kingdom	The ship was lost at Bonny, Africa. Her crew were rescued.

== 26 June ==
List of shipwrecks: 26 June 1864
Ship	State	Description
Alfred	United Kingdom	The brig was driven ashore east of Calais, France. She was on a voyage from Newcastle upon Tyne, Northumberland to Lisbon, Portugal. She was refloated the next day and taken in to Calais.
America	United States	The yacht capsized in a squall and sank in the Delaware River with the loss of all eleven people on board.

== 27 June ==
List of shipwrecks: 27 June 1864
Ship	State	Description
Colonel Satterly	United States	American Civil War: Loaded with gravel, sand, and stone, the schooner was scuttled as a blockship by Union Army forces in Trent's Reach on the James River in Virginia.
E. W. Benton	United States	American Civil War: Loaded with gravel, sand, and stone, the schooner was scuttled as a blockship by Union Army forces in Trent's Reach.
Franklin	Confederate States of America	American Civil War: The barque was scuttled as a blockship by Union Army forces in Trent's Reach.
Haxall	United States	American Civil War: Loaded with gravel, sand, and stone, the schooner was scuttled as a blockship by Union Army forces in Trent's Reach.
Julie A. Whitford (or Julia A. Whitfield)	United States	American Civil War: Loaded with gravel, sand, and stone, the schooner was scuttled as a blockship by Union Army forces in Trent's Reach.
Mary Robinson	United States	The clipper was driven onto a reef at Howland Island (01°N 176°W) in the Pacific Ocean and wrecked during a strong squall. Her wreck slid off the reef and sank the next day.
Mist	Confederate States of America	American Civil War: Loaded with gravel, sand, and stone, the schooner was scuttled as a blockship by Union Army forces in Trent's Reach on or about 27 June.
Modern Greece	United Kingdom	American Civil War, Union blockade: After suffering nine shell hits while under fire by United States Navy ships, the 753- to 1,000-ton screw steamer was driven ashore by the armed screw steamer USS Cambridge and the gunboat USS Stars and Stripes (both United States Navy) and wrecked near Federal Point while trying to reach Wilmington, North Carolina, Confederate States of America, with a cargo of brandy, liquor, rifled cannons, brass smoothbore cannons, Enfield rifle muskets, gunpowder, clothing, and assorted civilian cargo. She sank 200 yards (180 m) yards offshore in 40 feet (12 m) of water.

== 28 June ==
List of shipwrecks: 28 June 1864
Ship	State	Description
Labuan	United Kingdom	The steamship was wrecked on a rock off Scalpay, Outer Hebrides. Her crew survived. She was on a voyage from Liverpool, Lancashire to Kronstadt and/or Narva, Russia.
Mart	United Kingdom	The ship was driven ashore at Culzean Castle, Ayrshire. She was on a voyage from Londonderry to Dunfanaghy, County Donegal. She was refloated on 1 July and taken in to Ayr.
Ovida Helene	Norway	The schooner was driven ashore on Læsø, Denmark. She was on a voyage from Newcastle upon Tyne, Northumberland, United Kingdom to Aalborg, Denmark. She was refloated on 28 June and taken in to Helsingør, Denmark in a leaky condition.
Sarah Mary	United Kingdom	American Civil War, Union blockade: Captured by the gunboat USS Norfolk Packet (United States Navy) on 24 June in the North Atlantic Ocean off Mosquito Inlet, Florida, while trying to run the Union blockade with a cargo of cotton, the 15-ton sloop grounded on a beach on the coast of South Carolina at the mouth of Horse Island Creek while her Union prize crew was sailing her to Port Royal, South Carolina, Confederate States of America.
Secondo Narcisso	Italy	The brig collided with Fethie (Ottoman Empire) and was severely damaged. She was on a voyage from Constantinople, Ottoman Empire to Marseille, Bouches-du-Rhône, France. She was towed in to Constantinople in a sinking condition by St. Giovanni Evangelista (Kingdom of Italy) and place under repair.
Stag	United Kingdom	The ship ran aground in the Black Sea off Point Stefano. She was on a voyage from Marianople, Russia to a British port. She was refloated and taken in to the Bosphorus.

== 29 June ==
List of shipwrecks: 29 June 1864
Ship	State	Description
Alvin Clark	United States	During a voyage in ballast to Oconto, Wisconsin, to pick up a cargo of wood, the 105-foot-9-inch (32.2 m), 220-gross register ton vessel – variously described as a two-masted schooner, a topsail schooner, a brig, and a brigantine – capsized and sank in 120 feet (37 m) of water in Green Bay near Chambers Island off the coast of Wisconsin during a gale with the loss of three lives. An unidentified brig rescued her survivors. Her wreck was discovered in the 1960s, refloated in 1968–1969, and moored on the Menominee River as a tourist attraction, but deteriorated to a lack of funding to conserve her. She later was placed on a bed of pea gravel ashore but deteriorated beyond any possibility of restoration, became an eyesore, and was disassembled and trucked to a landfill in May 1994.
Fœderis Arca	France	The ship was scuttled in the Atlantic Ocean after four of her fifteen crew had been murdered. Survivors were rescued by a Danish brig. She was on a voyage from Havre de Grâce, Seine-Inférieure to Veracruz, Mexico. Her crew were later arrested on charges of murder and mutiny and tried at a court martial, the ship having been chartered by the French government. Three were convicted and sentenced to death.
Pike	Flag unknown	The wooden barge struck a snag and sank in the Sacramento River below the I Street Bridge in Sacramento, California.

== 30 June ==
List of shipwrecks: 30 June 1864
Ship	State	Description
Eva	United Kingdom	The sloop was wrecked near the Ackergill Tower, Caithness. Her crew were rescued. She was on a voyage from Stornoway, Isle of Lewis to Hamburg.
Happy Return	United Kingdom	The schooner was wrecked on the Burbo Bank, in Liverpool Bay with the loss of two of her three crew. Survivors were rescued by the Liverpool Lifeboat. Five crew of the steamship British Queen (United Kingdom) drowned whilst attempting to rescue survivors when their boat capsized. Happy Return was on a voyage from Dublin to Liverpool, Lancashire.
Ivanhoe	Confederate States of America	American Civil War, Union blockade: While trying to enter Mobile Bay, the steamer, a blockade runner, was forced aground about 2 miles (3.2 km) east of Fort Morgan, Alabama, by the sidewheel paddle steamer USS Glasgow (United States Navy), after which the sloop-of-war USS Hartford, the gunboat USS Kennebec, and the sidewheel paddle steamer USS Metacomet (all United States Navy) fired between 700 and 800 shells at her. A United States Navy boat expedition burned her on 6 July.
Verbena	United Kingdom	The sloop ran aground on the Dog Head Sand, in The Wash. She was on a voyage from Goole, Yorkshire to King's Lynn, Norfolk She was refloated the next day and taken in to King's Lynn in a leaky condition.

== Unknown date ==
List of shipwrecks: unknown date in June 1864
Ship	State	Description
Abby Craig	United Kingdom	The full-rigged ship was wrecked at Gaspé, Province of Canada, British North America. She was on a voyage from London to Quebec City, Province of Canada.
Ali	Sweden	The ship departed from Hartlepool, County Durham, United Kingdom for Malmö. Presumed subsequently foundered with the loss of all hands; the body of her captain washed up on the coast of Jutland in September.
Anversois	Belgium	The ship ran aground in the Min River. She was on a voyage from Hong Kong to Foo Chow Foo, China. She was refloated and completed her voyage, arriving on 15 June. She was consequently condemned.
Badger	United Kingdom	The ship ran aground at Wilmington, Delaware, United States.
Betsy Williams	United Kingdom	The ship ran aground off Cape Nassau before 23 June. She was on a voyage from Liverpool, Lancashire to Demerara, British Guiana. She was refloated and completed her voyage.
Gyrn Castle	United Kingdom	The ship was wrecked in the Fisherman's Group. Her crew were murdered by pirates. She was on a voyage from Foochow, China to Japan.
Hydaspes	United Kingdom	The ship was wrecked near Rangoon, Burma. She was on a voyage from Rangoon to Liverpool. Hydaspes was refloated in September and beached at Rangoon. She was condemned.
Joseph Holmes	United Kingdom	The ship was wrecked at Bassein, India after 25 June. She was on a voyage from Bassein to a European port.
Kate	United Kingdom	The schooner ran aground on the Burrows Sand, in the North Sea off the coast of Essex. She was on a voyage from Newcastle upon Tyne, Northumberland to London. Kate was refloated but had to be beached on the Shipwash Sand. She was refloated on 30 June and taken in to Harwich, Essex.
HMS Liverpool	Royal Navy	The Liffey-class frigate ran aground off the coast of Santo Domingo. She was refloated and ordered to England for repairs.
Olive	United States	After coal oil she was carrying caught fire, the 220-ton sternwheel paddle steamer was scuttled in the Ohio River at Buffington Island to extinguish the flames. She later was refloated, repaired, and returned to service.
Pomona	United Kingdom	The ship was wrecked at Gaspé. She was on a voyage from Hull, Yorkshire to Quebec City.
Rollon	United Kingdom	The ship was wrecked off Great Inagua, the Bahamas in early June. She was on a voyage from Haiti to a European port.
Seth	United Kingdom	The ship was wrecked at Landskrona, Sweden before 26 June. She was on a voyage from Liverpool to Vyborg, Grand Duchy of Finland.
Star of Victoria	(United Kingdom of Great Britain and Ireland) Victoria	The barque was wrecked at the New River Heads, New Zealand.
Tiger	United States	During a voyage from North Bend to Cincinnati, Ohio, towing a barge of hay, the 97.6-ton screw towboat struck Kirby Rock in the Ohio River and sank.
Yaratilda	United Kingdom	The East Indiaman foundered in the South China Sea after 8 June. She was on a voyage from Shanghai, China to London
Unidentified schooner	Flag unknown	American Civil War, Union blockade: Carrying a cargo of cotton and turpentine, the schooner sank in Indian River Inlet on the coast of Florida, Confederate States of America.
