= Imperial Lighthouse Service =

Lighthouse authority for the British Empire

The Imperial Lighthouse Service (ILS) was the official general lighthouse authority for the British Empire outside the United Kingdom.

The Imperial Lighthouse Service operated out of Trinity House and came under the control of the Board of Trade and was responsible for the provision and maintenance of navigational aids such as lighthouses, lightvessels, and buoys in all colonies of the British Empire.

With the end of the British Empire, most of these lighthouses were taken over by the newly independent countries and the Imperial Lighthouse Service stopped its operations by the late 1970s.

== Anguilla ==
Anguilla had the distinction of hosting the last ILS lighthouse in the West Atlantic Ocean at Sombrero, Anguilla. The inspector, however, was based in St. Kitts.

== Australia ==
The Board of Trade was responsible for navigation aids in Australia until the passing of the Commonwealth Navigation Act 1912, some 12 years after federation.

== Bahamas ==
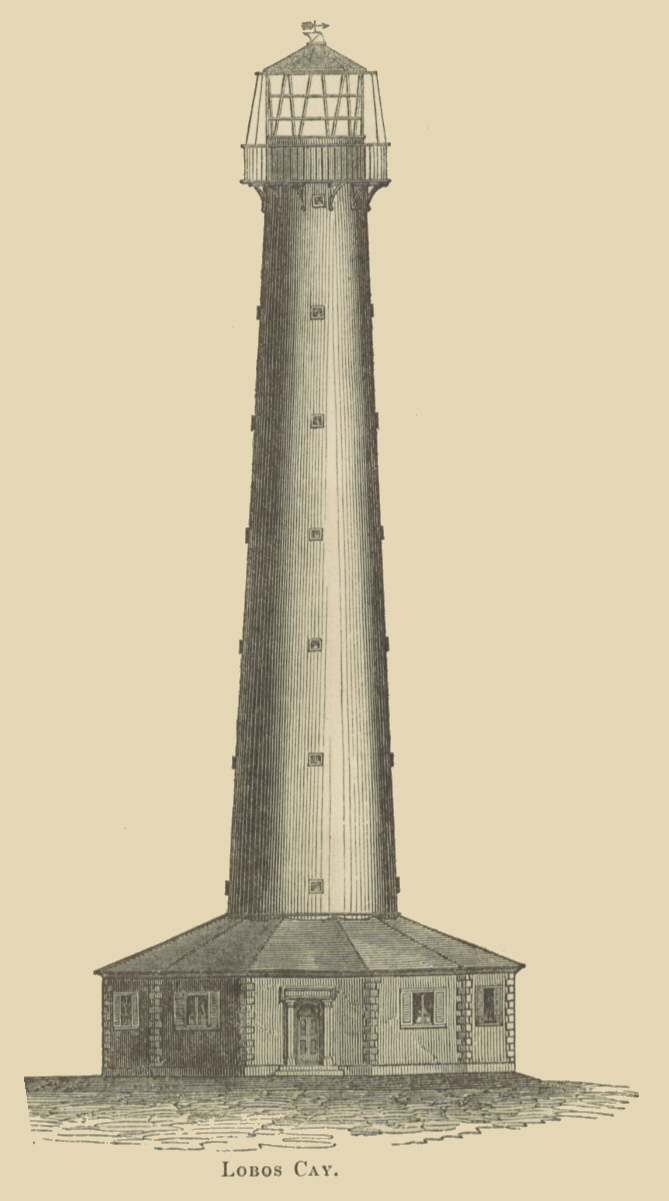
Lobos Cay, Bahamas

The Bahamas was the headquarters of the Imperial Lighthouse Service in the West Indies.

One of the oldest lighthouses in the Bahamas is the Hole-in-the-Wall lighthouse at the southernmost tip of the Abaco Islands. It was built in 1836 and thought to be the first lighthouse built in the Bahamas by the Imperial Lighthouse Service. Similarly, the iconic Elbow Reef Lighthouse at Hope Town was built by the service in 1863 to direct ships away from Hope Town and the dangerous Elbow Reef.

Other lighthouses maintained by the service included those at Dixon Hill lighthouse (Exuma) built in 1886, Great Isaac Cay (Bimini), North Rock (Bimini), Gun Cay (Bimini), and Riding Rock (Bimini).

In 1929, the pay for an inspector was £800/year.

Each lighthouse was issued with signal flags to warn residents and ships of impending hurricanes. In 1932, the lighthouses operated solar sensors that were used to automatically turn lights on and off. In 1936, the lighthouse at Gun Cay was decommissioned.

When the Bahamas gained independence in 1973, the colony's ILS was turned over to the new Ministry of Transport, and the employment of its 90-odd staff terminated. The last inspector was Commander John Coaker who was to stay on in the Bahamas following independence for a transitional period of up to a year.

== Ceylon (Sri Lanka) ==
The ILS operated lights in Ceylon. The head office for the service was located at Lightservice House, Horton Place, Colombo.

In 1916, Commander G. Stapleton was serving as the inspector for Ceylon and Minicoy. In 1921, Commander J. C. Kerkham was superintendent.

== Other ==
The ILS operated lights in the Falkland Islands.

While the Imperial Lighthouse Service was the responsible authority for the colonies,

- Trinity House was the responsible authority for England and Wales, the Channel Islands, Gibraltar and the Falkland Islands;
- Scotland and the Isle of Man fell under the auspices of the Northern Lighthouse Board; and
- Ireland was under the control the Commissioners of Irish Lights.

== See also ==
- List of lighthouses in Sri Lanka
- List of lighthouses in the Bahamas
