= Althea Mortimer =

Bahamian suffragist and educator

Althea Mortimer (November 20, 1908 – January 1997) was a Bahamian suffragist and educator who worked with the Women's Suffrage Movement and the Progressive Liberal Party to campaign for universal adult suffrage in The Bahamas.

== Early life and education ==
Mortimer was born on November 20, 1908, in Matthew Town, Inagua to Samuel and Lilla Mortimer. She moved to Nassau with her mother and older brother after her father died. She relocated to New York City with her brother to find work and further her education. After she returned to Nassau she worked as a legal secretary for Thaddeus A. (T.A.) Toote.

== Career ==
Mortimer opened a typing and shorthand school in 1947 in her home, and ran it for 40 years. Later, she was a Justice of the Peace and served on the Juvenile Panel.

Mortimer was a member of the Women's Suffrage Movement. She drafted key papers for the Women's Suffrage Movement to argue for suffrage, and she presented seminars to prepare for women to exercise their right to vote.

Mortimer was a founding member and supporter of the Progressive Liberal Party, which advocated universal adult suffrage. For her work with the party, she was appointed a Stalwart-Counselor for Life of the party.

== Recognition ==
Prime Minister Sir Lynden Pindling honored Mortimer as Woman of the Year for her achievement as a commercial educator. The documentary “The Women’s Suffrage Movement in The Bahamas” by Marion Bethel features Mortimer.

== Death ==
Mortimer died in January 1997.
