= CXY =

CXY may refer to:

- Cat Cays Airport, the Bahamas, IATA code CXY
- Capital City Airport (Pennsylvania), Pennsylvania, US, FAA LID CXY
