= Great Stirrup Cay =

- Island

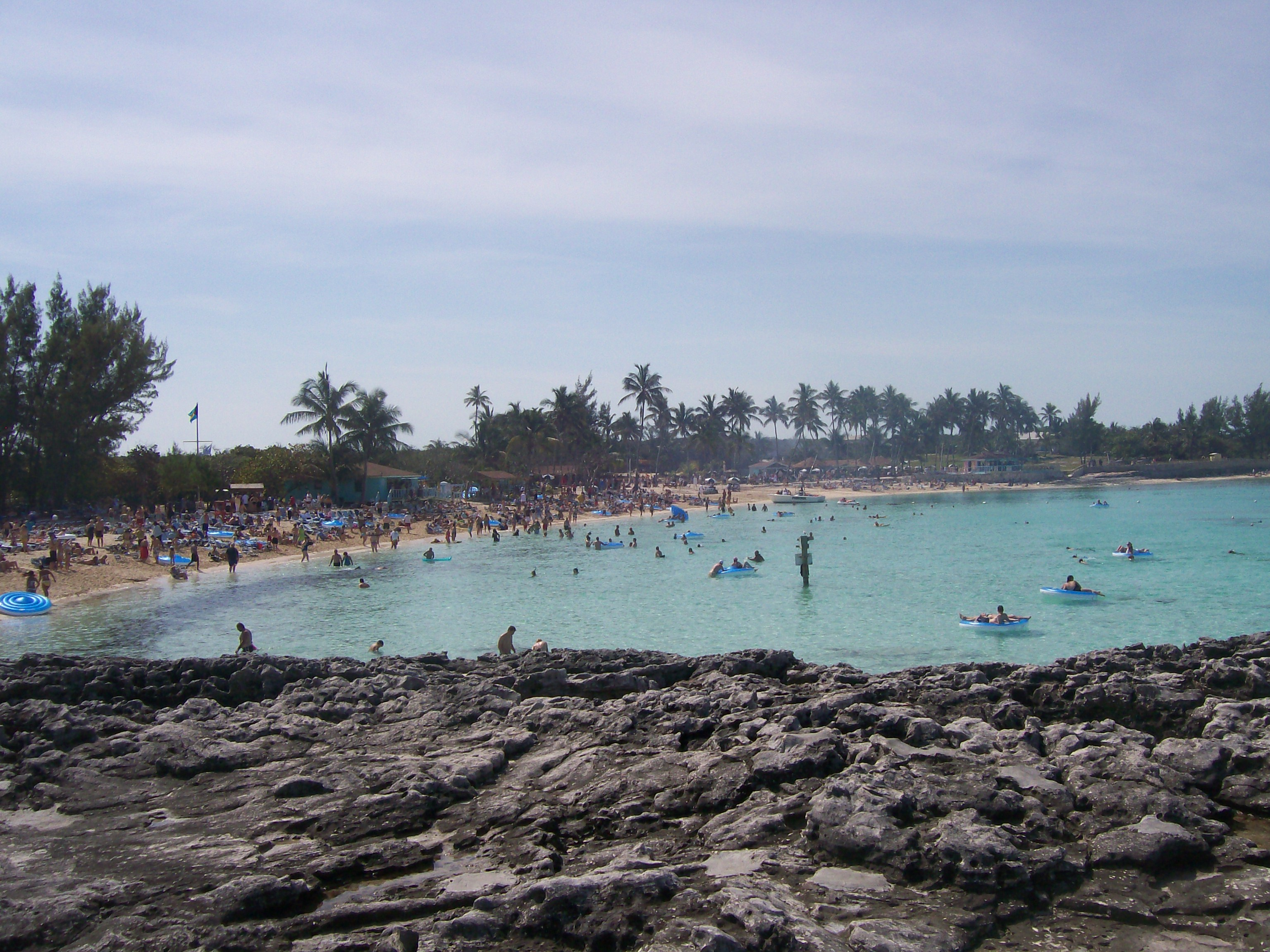
- Beach at Great Stirrup Cay

- Location within Bahamas
- Coordinates: 25°50′N 77°54′W
- Country: Bahamas
- Island: Great Stirrup Cay
- District: Berry Islands

Area
  - Land: 1.08 km^{2} (0.42 sq mi)

Population (2010)
  - Total: 5
  - Density: 4.6/km^{2} (12/sq mi)
- Time zone: UTC-5 (Eastern Time Zone)
- Area code: 242

Great Stirrup Cay Lighthouse
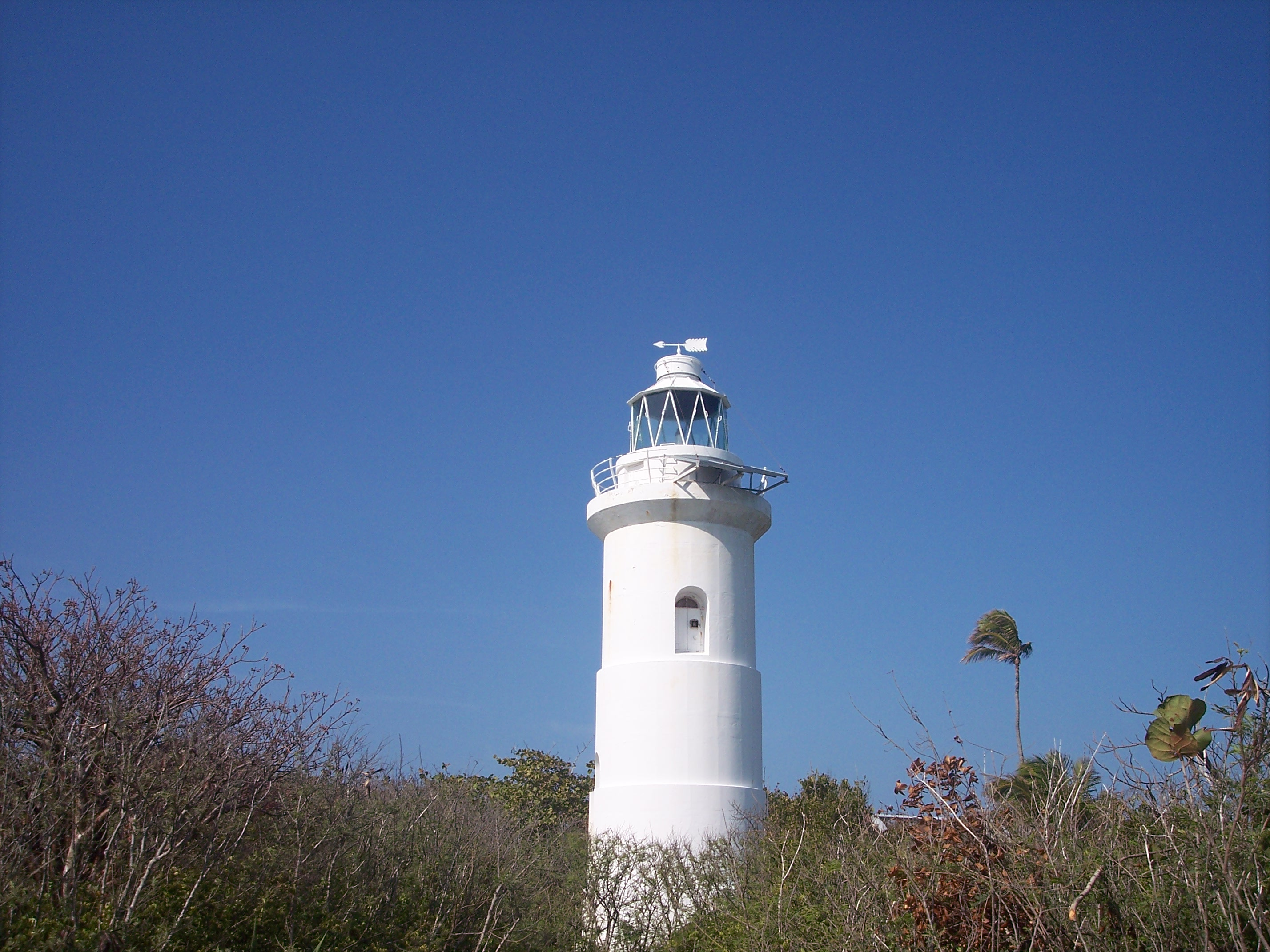
- Lighthouse at Great Stirrup Cay
- Location: Great Stirrup Cay; Berry Islands; Bahamas
- Coordinates: 25°49′24.7″N 77°54′03.1″W

Tower
- Constructed: 1863
- Construction: stone tower
- Height: 17 metres (56 ft)
- Shape: cylindrical tower with balcony and lantern
- Markings: white tower
- Power source: solar power
- Operator: Little Whale Cay Resort

Light
- Focal height: 25 metres (82 ft)
- Range: 22 nautical miles (41 km; 25 mi)
- Characteristic: Fl (2) W 20s.

Great Stirrup Cay is a 268-acre (108 ha) island that is part of the Berry Islands in the Bahamas. Norwegian Cruise Line purchased the island from the Belcher Oil Company in 1977 and developed it into a private island for their cruise ship passengers. The northern part of the island has a sandy beach surrounded by rocks with snorkeling areas. The southern part features a helicopter airfield (with a sign reading "Great Stirrup Cay International Airport"), a large area without vegetation, and numerous concrete blocks. These are all remnants of a previous U.S. military installation and satellite tracking station. The island's lighthouse was originally constructed in 1863 by the Imperial Lighthouse Service. Great Stirrup Cay is adjacent to Little Stirrup Cay, Royal Caribbean Cruises' private island.

== History ==
Great Stirrup Cay, along with the rest of the Bahamas, was formed by tectonic and glacial shifting. The first known settlers to the Bahamas were the Lucayan people, relatives of the Arawaks who populated the Caribbean around 600 A.D.

Great Stirrup was a pirate hideout while the British settled in Nassau and the larger islands until 1815. This time marks the first documented settlers of Great Stirrup, and many of the structures from this settlement still stand today. Nautical charts of this era show simply "Stirrup's Cay".

"Stirrup's Cay" remained active during the American Civil War, as the Confederates wished to continue to export cotton to Europe. The island was used as a landfall for provisioning while Federal warships patrolled the area to thwart their efforts. After the abolition of slavery, the British began to slowly withdraw from the out island colonies, and the plantation at Great Stirrup was abandoned. Great Stirrup is the northernmost island in a chain of islands known as the Berry Islands, and is situated in an area along the Northwest Providence Channel.

United States President Franklin D. Roosevelt fished off the reefs of Great Stirrup Cay in 1935.

During World War II, the United States, in an effort to protect its eastern shores, came to the Bahamas and Great Stirrup with a wide array of observational and defensive equipment. Among these were submersible cables, which were run along the ocean floor to listen for enemy submarines. Two "cable houses" still stand on the southeastern shore of the island, now overgrown by jungle. The United States Air Force later constructed a LORAC (LOng Range ACcuracy) radio-navigation station for use during the early space shuttle launches. This facility was later leased to Motorola and other private sector companies as contractors to the United States Air Force out of Patrick Air Force Base near Satellite Beach, Florida. New, more accurate GPS technology made the station obsolete. It was closed in 1991 and the antenna, equipment and radials were removed.

A cruise liner, Yarmouth Castle, traveling from Miami to Nassau, burned and sank 13 miles (21 km) off the coast of Great Stirrup Cay on November 13, 1965. The United States Coast Guard's board of inquiry determined that the captain and ship's officers were to blame for the ship's fire and sinking.

Belcher Oil Company of Miami staked claim to the north section of the island for many years. Their interests there included real estate speculation, oil exploration, and a possible site for a corporate retreat. In 1977, Norwegian Caribbean Lines (later Norwegian Cruise Line) leased this section from Belcher Oil, the first time a cruise line had exclusive control of a private island. Norwegian Caribbean Line bought the island in 1986.

In 1990, Norwegian Cruise Line spent $1 million on upgrades to the island and, for a few years, it started marketing the island as Pleasure Island. In 2017, Norwegian Cruise Line built new food and drink areas, rebuilt cabanas, and expanded the beach areas. Norwegian Cruise Line plans to build 38 private villas with up to two bedrooms each, a two-story restaurant, a swim-up bar, and a spa area. In 2024, NCL announced plans to build a two-ship pier at Great Stirrup Cay. The island is only accessible via tender boats from cruise ships. The pier opened on December 28, 2025 to the Norwegian Getaway.

== Lighthouse ==
In 1863, the Imperial Lighthouse Service erected the lighthouse on Great Stirrup Cay. The lighthouse was staffed for many years, but it is now fully automated and solar powered, making it self-sufficient. The structure stands nearly 80 feet, and its light is visible for over 20 miles.

== Graves ==
Two people are buried on the island, both in a fenced grassy area near the visitor center. Allan Bertram was a Royal Navy captain who owned the island and when he died in 1834 requested burial there. The main swimming area, Bertram's Cove, is named after him. Elizabeth Wright Braden Hixson was a passenger on a passing ship who died in 1838. She was then interred on the island.

== Flora and fauna ==
The most common tree on the island is the coconut palm, which produces a cloudy milk and a sweet meat used in many island recipes. Another fruit-bearing tree is the sea grape.

== Wildlife ==
Some of the creatures found on the island include several different varieties of lizard and land crab. Gulls, frigatebirds, and sanderlings are the most prevalent bird species.

Great Stirrup Cay is a protected marine life sanctuary, and removal of anything from the water is strictly prohibited.

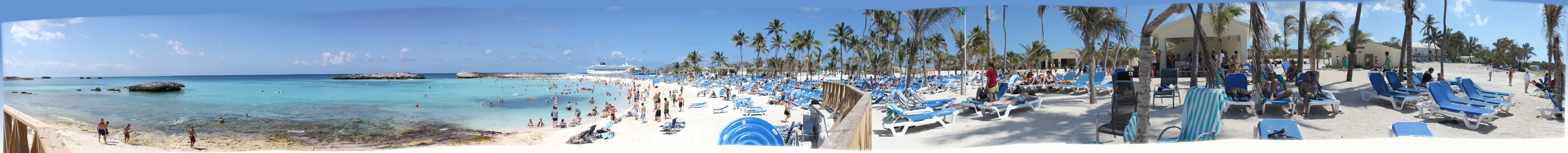
Great Stirrup Cay.

== Climate ==
Great Stirrup Cay has a tropical climate. The daytime average temperatures from December to April are around 75 °F (24 °C), while the average daily temperature is between 85–93 °F (29–34 °C) from May to November.

The average rainfall is 1 inch (2.5 cm) per month from November to April and 3.5 inches (10 cm) per month from May to October.

The average sea temperature from May to November is 81–86 °F (27–30 °C); it averages 77 °F (25 °C) from December to April.

July averages the most hours of sunshine, while September through February averages the least hours of sunshine, with 7 to 8 hours per day.

== Gallery ==
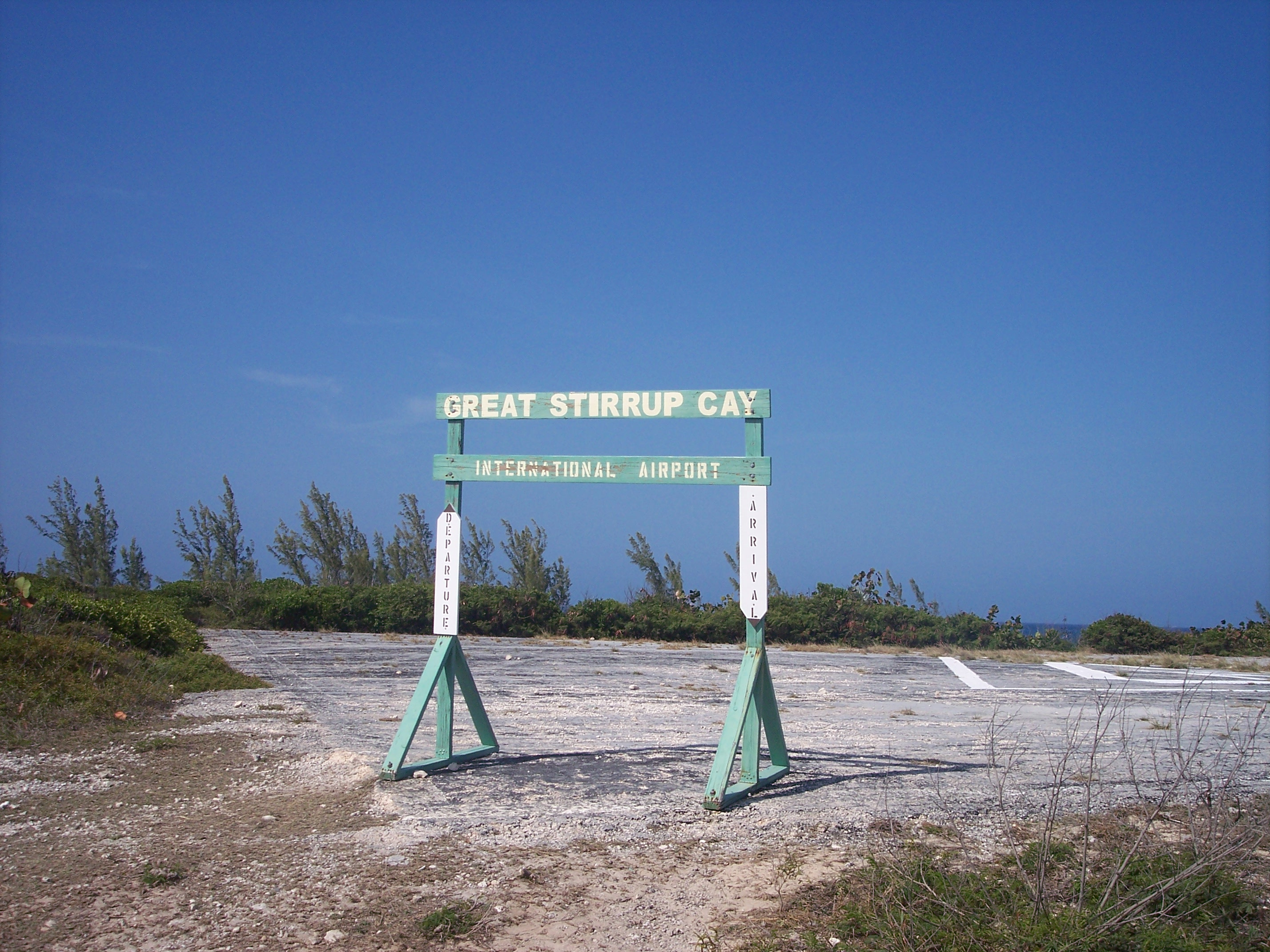
Helipad at Great Stirrup Cay

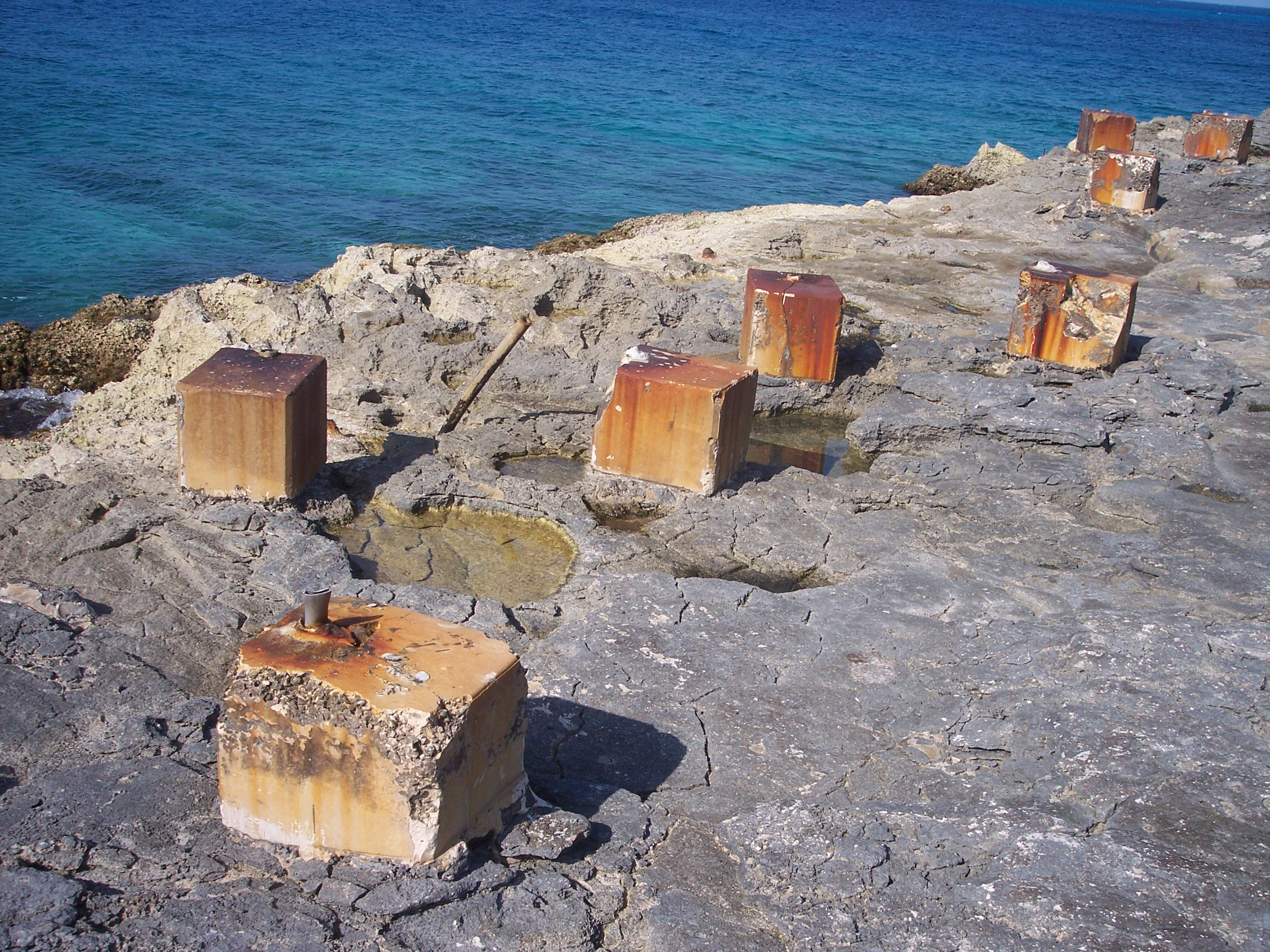
Numerous concrete blocks along the shore of Great Stirrup Cay

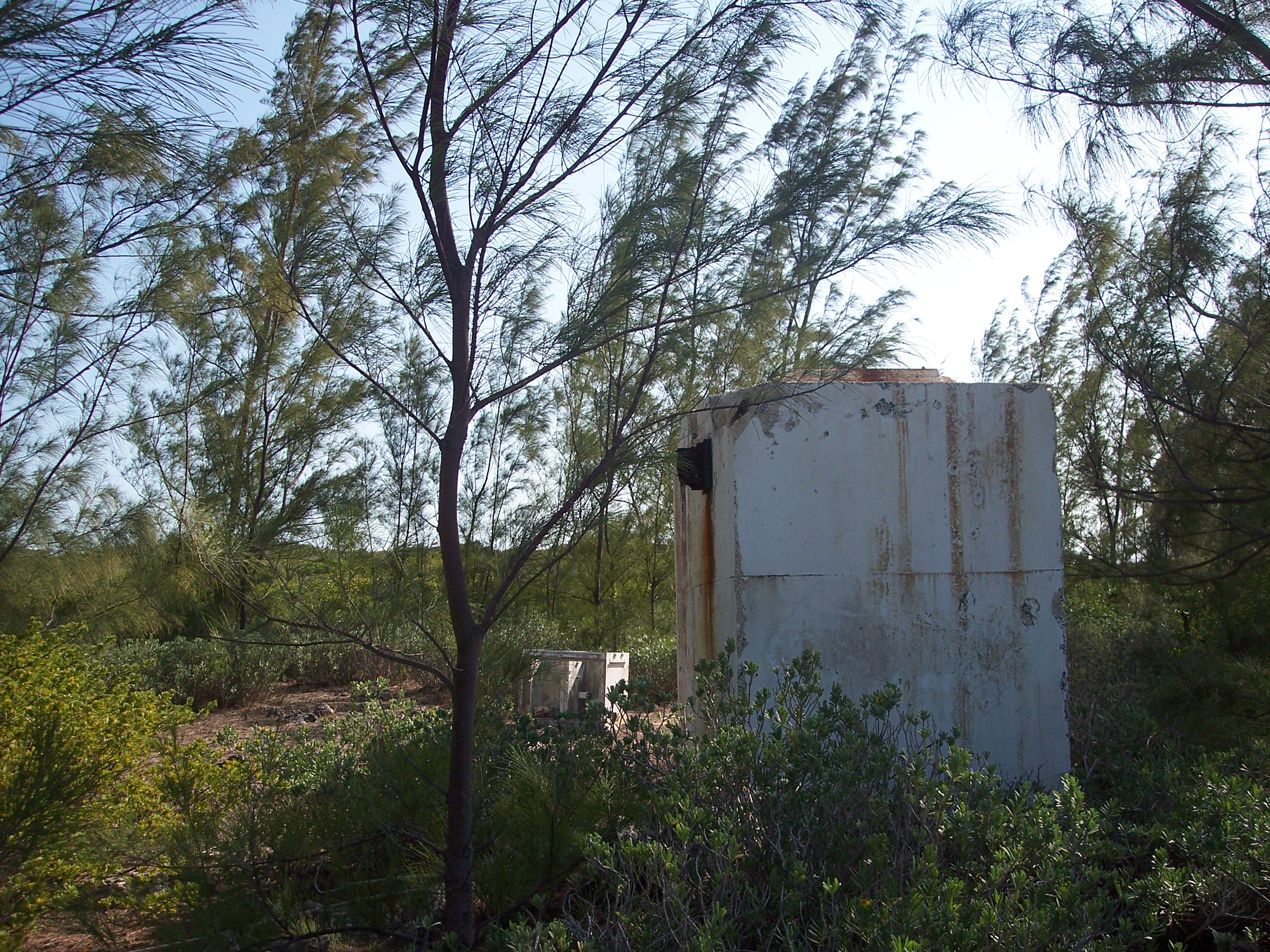
Giant concrete block in the trees of Great Stirrup Cay

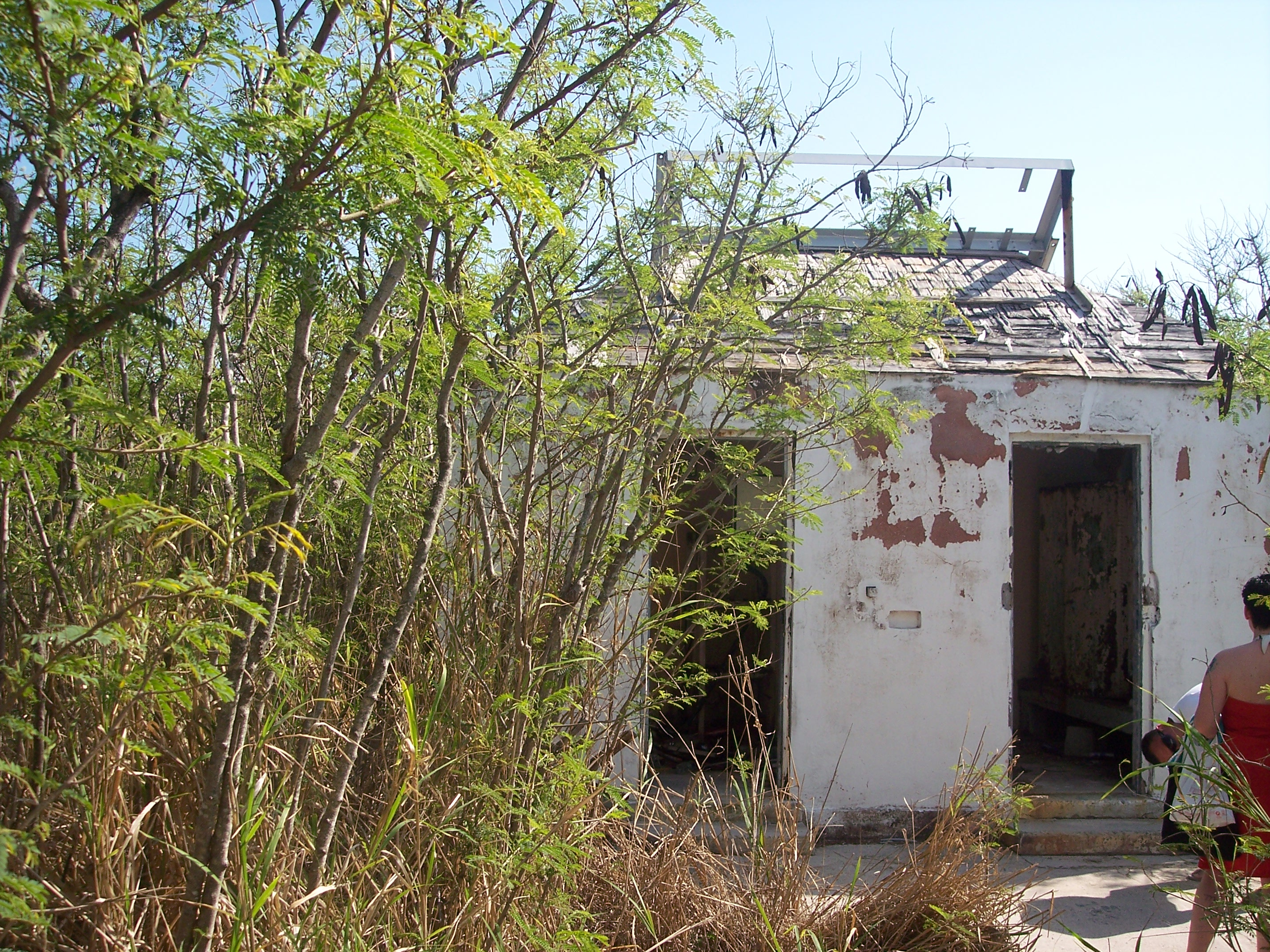
An abandoned hut on Great Stirrup Cay

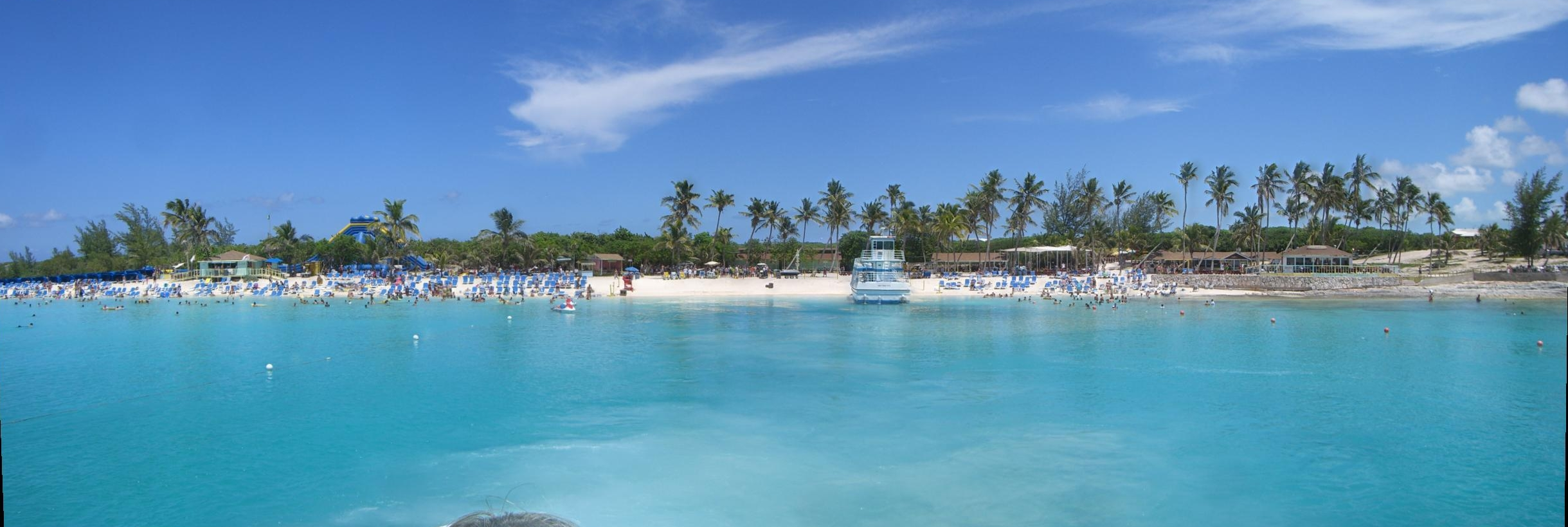
Panoramic view of GSC beach from sea

== See also ==
- List of lighthouses in the Bahamas
