= Cat Cays =

Two islands in the Bahamas

North Cat Cay Breakwater Lighthouse
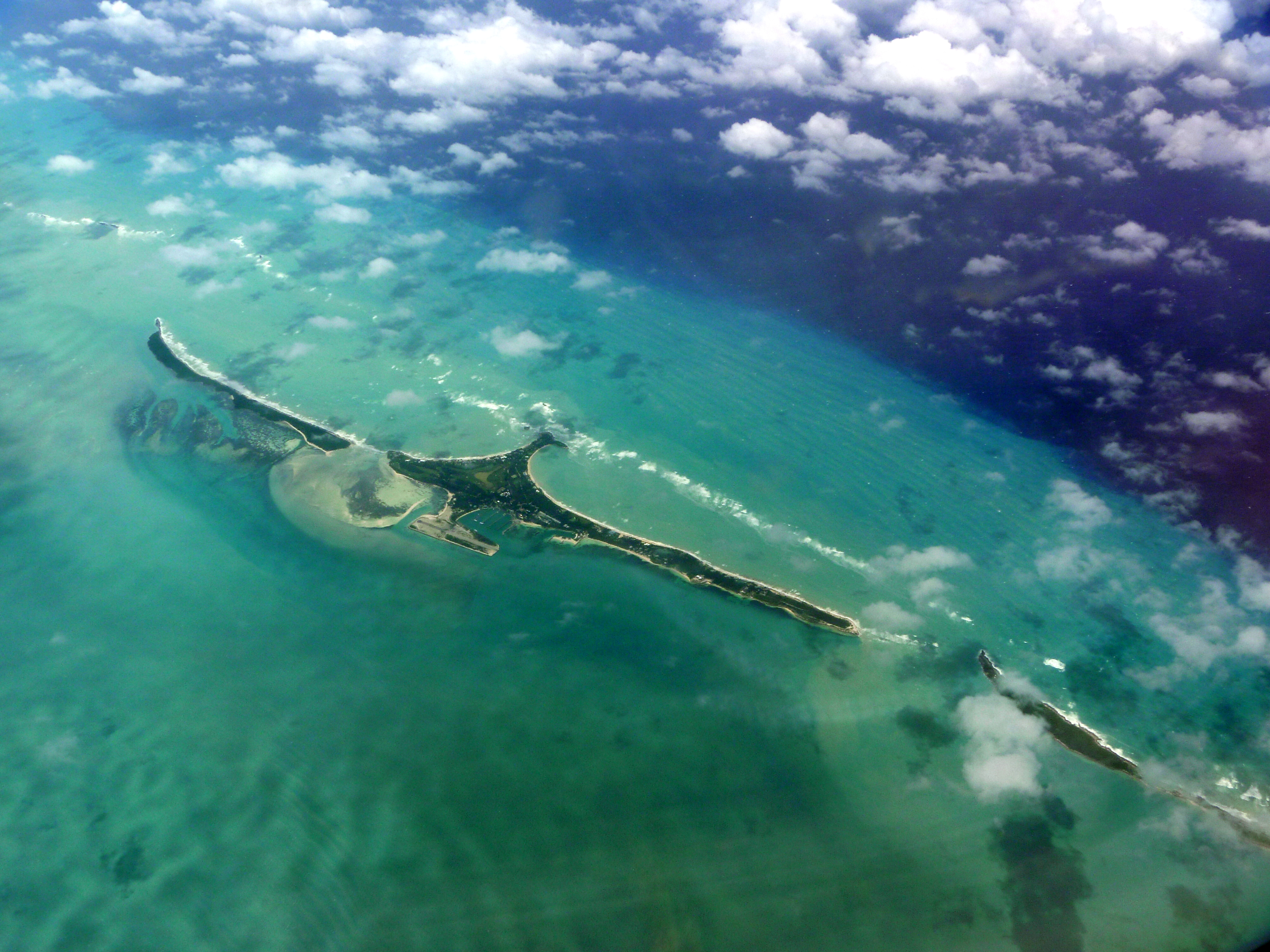
- Cat Cays from the air
- Location: North Cat Cay; Bimini; Bahamas
- Coordinates: 25°33′22.5″N 79°16′37.7″W

Tower
- Constructed: 1933
- Construction: Masonry tower
- Height: 12 feet (3.7 m)
- Shape: Circular truncated tower with lantern
- Markings: White tower
- Power source: solar power

Light
- Focal height: 10 feet (3.0 m)
- Range: 5 nautical miles (9.3 km; 5.8 mi)
- Characteristic: Fl W 2s.

The Cat Cays are two islands in the Bahamas, North Cat Cay and South Cat Cay, approximately 10 miles (16 km) south of Bimini. North Cat Cay is a privately owned island and is run as a private members club by the Cat Cay Yacht Club. South Cat Cay is currently under development.

== History ==
North Cat Cay is a small private island in the Bimini chain of The Bahamas. It is named after the "cat line" of a sailing vessel which it resembles, and was once used by pirates Edward Teach, also known as Blackbeard, and Charles Vane. Queen Victoria granted the original deed for Cat Cay to Captain William Henry Stuart in 1873, as a reward for his services as keeper of the lighthouse on neighboring Gun Cay.

Later, Captain Arthur Samuel Haigh, an Englishman, became the owner of Cat Cay. Captain Haigh established the island custom of dressing formally for dinner. While his original home burned, the cookhouse remained intact and its huge oven fireplace is part of the rebuilt cottage named Haigh House in his honor. Haigh is buried in the historic Anglican graveyard on North Bimini.

Milo Strong and his wife bought the island in 1915 and they built and lived in the Manor House, extant today. They spent nine months out of the year on Cat Cay. The 1929 hurricane blew the roof off of their home and this was repaired but Strong died two years later and another storm damaged the Manor House, after which Mrs. Strong decided to sell.

Friends of the Strongs, Louis and Rae Wasey purchased the island for $400,000 in 1931. Wasey, an advertising executive from New York City, intended the island to be a winter home for himself and his wife and as a place to entertain clients and friends. He enlarged the Manor House and built a number of English-style “cottages” for his guests.

During the Great Depression, Wasey turned the island development over to a friend and architect Mike Smith who loved the Bahamian and old English architecture and used both in making the island buildings. He employed Bahamians, sent a schooner to Cuba for handmade tiles from deserted churches and had men search the Florida swamps for angled pieces of wood needed for his Tudor-style buildings.

In 1935, Wasey converted the island to a private club and sold building lots to his friends. He had about 200 members paying annual dues of $500.00. Mrs. Wasey, who loved antiques, built the Cat Cay English Shoppe, where the island boutique now stands.

There were many fishing tournaments held in the 1930s, late 40s and throughout the 1950s and 60s as the waters around Cat Cay were well stocked with fish and the deep water fishing lay just a mile offshore. The structure known as the tuna tower on many fishing yachts was invented on Cat Cay and first used by a skipper in the 1952 Cat Cay Tuna Tournament. While the first tower was rudimentary at best, its usefulness was quickly noted.

In World War II, Cat Cay was a paramilitary base for PT boats of the British and Allied Forces. US General Hap Arnold, in charge of the US Army Air Corps, spent several months recuperating from a heart attack at Lou Wasey's Cat Cay home. An Air Force officer stationed there, Monk Forster, fell in love with the island and returned after the war to manage the club and he acquired the home "High Tide", built by Wasey's partner O.B. Winters.

Lou Wasey built a nine-hole golf course that the former British king Edward VIII, later Duke of Windsor, enjoyed playing while Governor of the Bahamas during World War II. The course was named Windsor Downs in his honor. During one of his visits the Duke mentioned that it might be fun to have a little casino on the island for guests, Wasey readily agreed and the Duke issued a license in Lou Wasey's name. The American DuPont family, including members of the Carpenter and Crowninshield families, owned and had use of the property on the island for many years.

Upon Wasey's death in 1963, the island's casino license expired. Wasey willed the island to his daughter Jane, a New York sculptor, who returned for two years. In 1965 Hurricane Betsy did enormous damage and, the island was closed.

A few years later, Al Rockwell, head of Rockwell International, put together a small group of investors and purchased the island. It became a private club owned by members.

The island has hosted many prominent guests over its many years from screen stars to royalty and including former American President Richard Nixon who was the frequent guest of Bob Abplanalp, a homeowner and long-time friend of Nixon. Fishing in Cat Cay remains strong. Tuna are less common now, but mahi mahi, Blue and White Marlin, Wahoo, Snapper and Grouper are available.

The island remains a private club, but for visiting yachts entering The Bahamas it is an official port of entry for The Bahamas and Bahamas Customs and the Royal Bahamas Police Force are present on the island.

== See also ==
- Cat Cays Airport
- List of lighthouses in the Bahamas
