= Cat Cays Airport =

Airport in North Cat Cay, The Bahamas

Cat Cay Airport
- IATA: CXY; ICAO: MYCC

Summary
- Airport type: PRIVATE
- Serves: North Cat Cay
- Location: Bahamas
- Elevation AMSL: 0 ft / 0 m
- Coordinates: 25°33′19.0″N 79°16′33.8″W

Map
- Location of Cat Cay Airport in the Bahamas

Runways
Direction	Length		Surface
Direction	m	ft	Surface
13/31	609	2,000	Asphalt
- Source: Landings.com

Cat Cay Airport (IATA: CXY, ICAO: MYCC) is a private airport located on North Cat Cay, the Bahamas. The airport is for the exclusive use of the Cat Cay Yacht Club and requires you to either be a member, or be sponsored by a member to land. The airport is served by Tropic Ocean Airways on a charter basis or by Fly the Whale in the winter, also on a charter basis.

== See also ==
- List of airports in the Bahamas
- List of shortest runways
