= Little San Salvador Island =

Island in the Bahamas

Coordinates: 24.574°N 75.952°W

- viewed from the east
- Interactive map of Little San Salvador Island

Geography
- Location: The Bahamas, West Indies, Atlantic Ocean
- Type: Cay
- Archipelago: Lucayan Archipelago
- Area: 2,400 acres (970 ha)

Administration
- Bahamas
- District: Cat Island

Little San Salvador Island, also known as Half Moon Cay or RelaxAway, Half Moon Cay (/ˈkiː/), is one of about 700 islands that make up the archipelago of The Bahamas. It is located roughly halfway between Eleuthera and Cat Island, administratively in the Cat Island District. It is a private island, owned by Carnival Corporation & plc, which uses it as a port of call for the cruise ships it operates in the region.

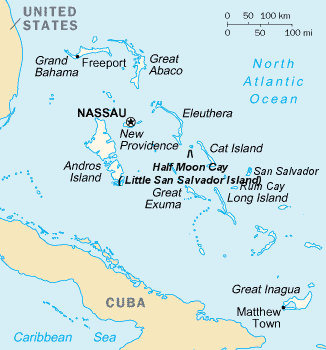
Map of Bahamas

Little San Salvador Island is located about 100 miles (160 kilometres) southeast of Nassau. Holland America Line purchased the island in December 1996 for a price of US$6 million. It has since developed 50 acres (200,000 m^{2}) of the 2,400-acre (9.7 km^{2}) island, with the stated goal of maintaining as much habitat as possible for wildlife. The island is also a significant nesting area for waterfowl. On June 1, 2026, Carnival Corporation announced expanded amenities to the island, including a new port which allows passengers to disembark and embark without the use of previously required tenders.

== History ==
On December 28, 1851, the island was mentioned in the letter of a sailor known only as "F". Published by The Louisville Journal, the letter described gale force winds, and "rain [that] poured in torrents" as they passed the area of the island.

In September 1883, a Category 3 hurricane came through, wreaking havoc across the islands. Captain Dorsey of the Carleton, a ship headed from Nassau to Iuiqua with 14 passengers, sailed the ship to the harbor of Little San Salvador to wait out a "heavy thunderstorm". They arrived at the harbor at 3 pm, and at 10 pm the Captain had noted that the barometer had fallen four tenths, and informed the passengers "that a hurricane was blowing". The ship was blown out of the safety of the harbor, and as a result multiple passengers died, including Rev. J.S.J. Higgs, the rector of the parish of San Salvador Island.

On June 22, 1901, the British sloop Lizzie Culmer was blown ashore the island and wrecked, resulting in the death of one woman. The Culmer was bound for Nassau carrying merchandise and passengers from Rum Bay. The schooner William F. Campbell which had been carrying pineapples, rescued the surviors.

On January 1, 1902, the British fruit trading ship Frascati was abandoned off the shore of the island. Just after midnight, the ship struck a reef and sank.

In 1907, Dr. N.L. Britton, the director of the New York Botanical Garden, led a party to the island in hopes of finding new plant specimens.

In 1935, for his annual fishing trip, President Franklin D. Roosevelt, with the USS Farragut as an escort, sailed John Jacob Astor IV's former yacht Nourmahal around the Bahamas. While off the coast of Little San Salvador, the party set off in small boats on an excursion to capture tropical fish to be added to tanks aboard the Nourmahal. While on a Good Neighbor policy trip to the Bahamas in March 1936, Roosevelt returned to the island aboard the Presidential yacht USS Potomac for recreational swimming and fishing.

In 1940, at the start of World War II, President Roosevelt met with Edward VIII to discuss locations for a new United States naval base to be located in the Bahamas. Little San Salvador was considered, as well as Eleuthera and Long Island.

In July 1941, two Floridian yacht enthusiasts anchored off the island for two weeks.

The island's popularity for US Presidents continued, and in March 1957 Dwight D. Eisenhower visited to troll for fish.

In July, three men visited the island to catch bonefish in the island's lagoon.

In 1972, a group from Boston University visited the island for an ecological survey.

=== 1975 onwards: cruise ship tourism ===
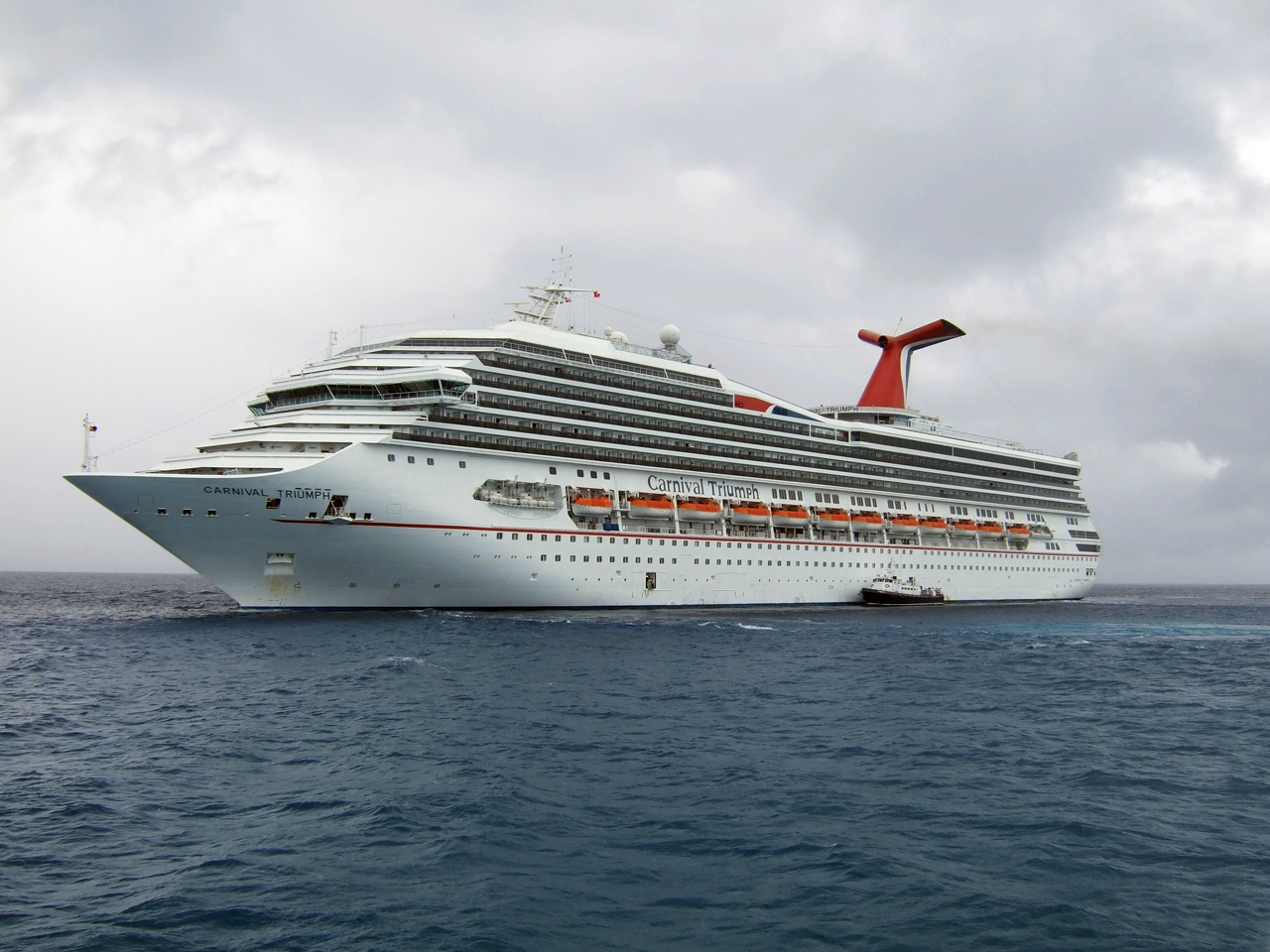
The Carnival Triumph at Half Moon Cay

In 1975, a buyer for Little San Salvador was being sought. The listing price was originally $3.6 million, but was then lowered to $3 million to entice a buyer.

In December 1975, the captain of windjammer Phantome reported to the US Coast Guard a suspicious midnight rendezvous between a 28-foot boat and a freighter off the coast of the island.

In January 1976, after their plane lost power, two Detroit men survived the crash and were marooned on the island.

In 1978, the New York based company Caribbean Schooner Cruises announced two four-masted schooners that would sail from Nassau taking tourists to Spanish Wells, Cat Island, Little San Salvador, Great Guana Cay, and Andros Island.

Knut Kloster, founder of Norwegian Cruise Line, began negotiating to buy Little San Salvador in 1979, to guarantee his ships could always dock, "for an afternoon of swimming and lazing on the beach." NCL succeeded in acquiring the island, and the first large cruise ship to visit the island was a NCL employee and guest cruise on May 30, 1980, sailing aboard the SS Norway.

In 1987, in response to the New York trash barge incident, it was proposed to turn the lagoon on the island into a landfill. The goal was then build condominiums and restaurants on top of the landfill, but the Bahamas rejected the idea.

In December 1996, it was announced that Holland America Line was buying the island. They purchased the island for $6 million, and planned to invest $16 million into the construction of all new facilities. The company renamed the destination Half Moon Cay upon its opening in December 1997.

To better compete with CocoCay, on December 10, 2024 Carnival announced a massive expansion and renovation to the island. A new pier is envisioned for North Arrival Plaza to allow up to Carnival's Excellence Class to dock, including the Mardi Gras launched in 2020, removing some of the need to tender to the island. A new name was also revealed, RelaxAway, Half Moon Cay.

== Ownership ==
In 1863, one-eighth of the island was owned by a man named Joshua Newbold. In his last will and testament, he left the island to his wife Jane for life, and after her death it was to be left to their children Edward, Joshua, Hezekiah, Dorsett, Josiah, Zephaniah, Elijah, and Georgiana for life, and then to their children for life. In 1930, before the supreme court of the Bahamas, it was declared that Joshua and Jane's children each possessed an equal share per capita of the one-eighth share.

Little San Salvador, LLC. began acquiring shares of the island from the Newbold's grandchildren, and by 1960 had ownership of thirteen sixteenths of the island.

Island Sanctuary Ltd, in 1987, also had claimed ownership of the island, stating they had purchased the island from Newbold descendants in 1966.

== Facilities ==
Activities offered on the island include swimming, sunbathing, scuba diving, jet-skiing, cycling, and snorkeling. Deep-sea fishing, parasailing, glass-bottom boat rides, and nature walks also are available. A variety of water toys are available for rent, including Hobie catamarans, Sunfish sailboats, windsurfing sailboards, and kayaks. There are volleyball and basketball courts, horseshoes, shuffleboard, a fitness trail with exercise stations, horseback riding, and nature trails for hiking.

== Etymology ==
The indigenous Lucayan people called the island Guateo, meaning "distant land".

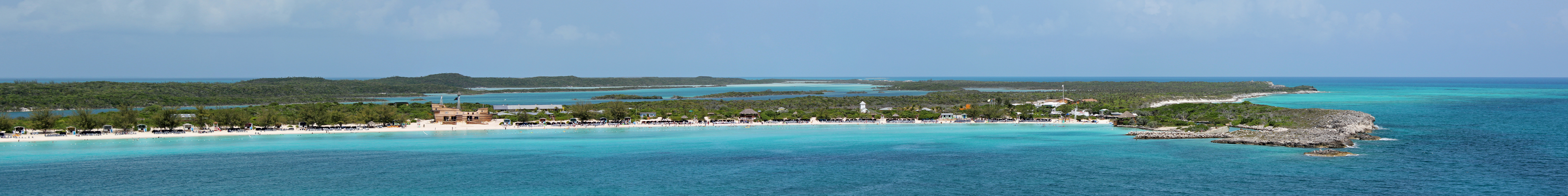
Panorama of Half Moon Cay from the Carnival Pride.

== See also ==
- List of islands of the Bahamas
- Private island
