= USS Courier (1861) =

Gunboat of the United States Navy

History

United States
- Acquired: 7 September 1861
- Commissioned: 17 September 1861
- Out of service: 14 June 1864
- Fate: Wrecked 14 June 1864

General characteristics
- Displacement: 556 tons
- Length: 135 ft (41 m)
- Beam: 30 ft (9.1 m)
- Draught: 15 ft (4.6 m)
- Propulsion: not known
- Speed: not known
- Complement: 82
- Armament: two 32-pounder guns

The first USS Courier was a storeship acquired by the Union Navy during the American Civil War. She was used by the Union Navy as a supply ship to support Union Navy ships engaged in the blockade of Southern ports. Courier also operated as a gunboat when the opportunity presented itself from time to time.

== Purchased in New York City in 1861 ==
Courier, a storeship, was purchased 7 September 1861 from W. B. Thomas and Co., New York City, and commissioned 17 September 1861, Acting Master W. K. Cressy in command.

== Service history ==
Courier sailed from New York City 17 October 1861 on the first of many voyages to bring supplies to ships at Port Royal, South Carolina, along the Florida coast, and in the Gulf of Mexico as far west as New Orleans, Louisiana. Participating in the Union blockade of the Confederate States of America, Courier captured three blockade runners, Angelina and Emeline on 16 May 1863 and Maria Bishop on 17 May 1863.

Courier ran aground in the Abaco Islands in the Bahamas on 14 June 1864 and had to be abandoned, but her officers and men, together with her stores and cargo, were saved and sent to the United States.
