= Great Isaac Lighthouse =

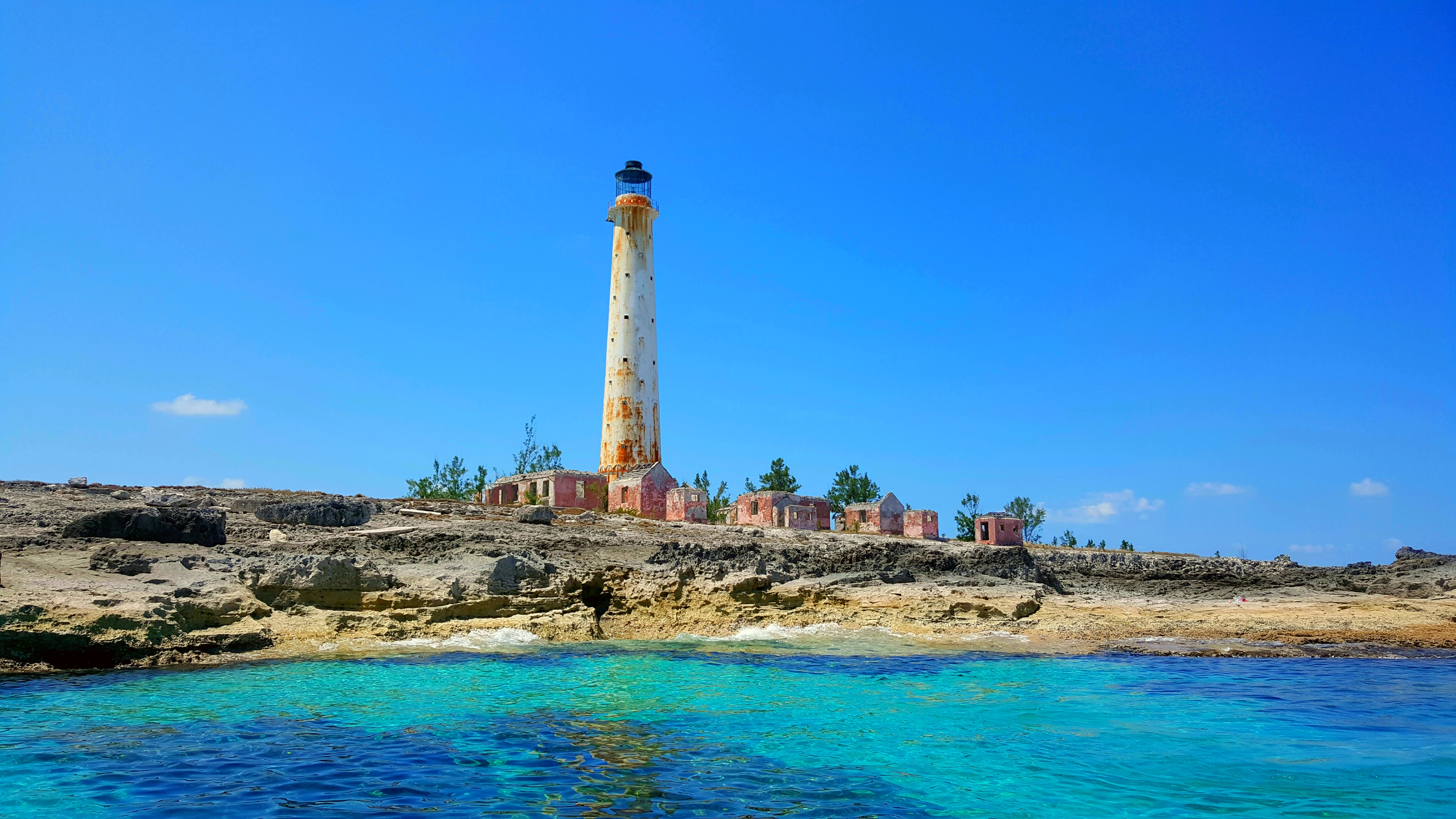
- Great Isaac Cay Lighthouse in 2017
- Location: Great Isaac Cay, Bimini, The Bahamas
- Coordinates: 26°01′42″N 79°05′22″W

Tower
- Constructed: 1851
- Foundation: concrete base
- Construction: cast iron tower
- Shape: tapered cylindrical tower with balcony and lantern
- Markings: white tower, black lantern
- Power source: solar power
- Operator: Bahamas Port Department

Light
- First lit: 1859
- Deactivated: 2000-2008
- Focal height: 46 m (151 ft)
- Range: 23 nmi (43 km; 26 mi)
- Characteristic: Fl W 15s

Great Isaac Lighthouse is a lighthouse on the small Bahamian island of Great Isaac Cay. Erected in 1859, it is located about 20 miles (32 km) NNE of the Bimini Islands, and accessible only by boat. The lighthouse stands about 151 feet (46 m) tall.

== Vanished keepers ==
On August 4, 1969, the station was discovered to have been abandoned by its two keepers, who were never found. Many believers in the Bermuda Triangle claim that the keepers were two more victims lost to its mysterious forces. However, the hurricane record from 1969 indicates that Tropical Storm Anna, the first major tropical storm of 1969, on 1–2 August, passed close enough to Great Isaac Island to cause dangerous weather for the tiny rock island. By the 4th of August, the storm was well into the Atlantic Ocean.

== Public site ==
The grounds are open to the public, although the lighthouse itself has had stairs removed to block access to the interior of that structure. The keepers’ house, cistern, and assorted buildings are crumbling into ruins. The derelict collection of abandoned buildings make Great Isaac Cay a popular destination for boaters.

Edit: Stairs are in the lighthouse as of April 2026. On April 12, YouTuber Brandon Gross posted video of him and a friend scaling the stairs and offering magnificent views from the lantern (top) portion of the lighthouse.

== See also ==
- List of lighthouses in the Bahamas
