= CocoCay =

Private Bahamian island used for tourism

Perfect Day CocoCay Little Stirrup Cay
- Island

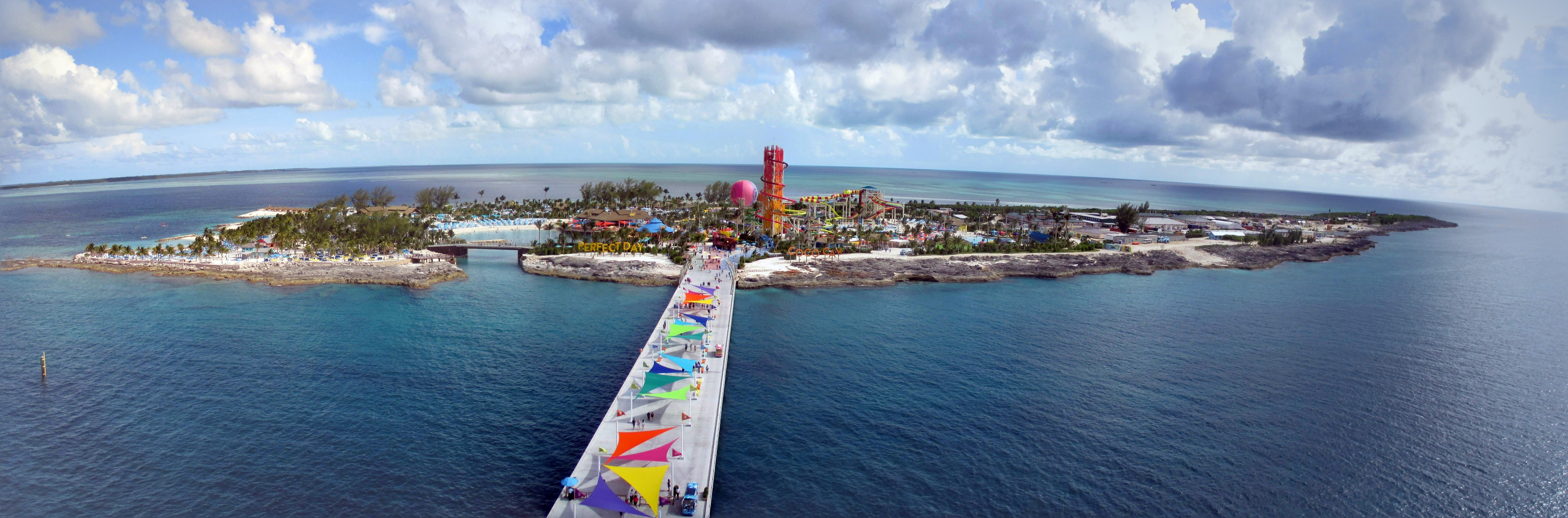
- Pier leading to island

- Location within Bahamas
- Coordinates: 25°49′N 77°56′W
- Country: Bahamas
- Island: Little Stirrup Cay
- District: Berry Islands

Population (2010)
  - Total: 38
- Time zone: UTC-5 (Eastern Time Zone)
- Area code: 242

CocoCay or Little Stirrup Cay, sometimes titled Perfect Day at CocoCay (/koʊkoʊkeɪ/) is one of the Berry Islands, a collection of Bahamian cays and small islands located approximately 55 miles (89 km) north of Nassau. It is used for tourism by Royal Caribbean Group exclusively. Little Stirrup Cay is adjacent to Great Stirrup Cay, Norwegian Cruises' private island since 1977.

== Geography ==
The island is less than one mile (1.6 km) long from east to west and less than 480 yards (0.44 km) from north to south. It has a population of 38 (2010 census).

== History ==
On the night of 13 October 1848, the ship Susan Drew ran aground on the island. To lighten the ship enough to raise it off the sea floor, the captain ordered the masts cut and disposed of. Afterwards the ship was able to be towed to Nassau. On 7 April 1855, the ship Oswego took on water and was beached near the island to save it from sinking. The lower cargo hold was one-third full of water when the ship was abandoned. In February 1868, the brig C. B. Allen, Bray was badly damaged and had to beach itself on Little Stirrup Cay. In February 1871, USS Pawnee was beached and had to be towed off the sandbar by HMS Philomel. In December 1872, Prestissimo, Dahms was beached and had to throw overboard 3,000 bushels of salt to free itself.

On 30 July 1986, a fire broke out in a storage locker upon the Eastern Steamship Lines' SS Emerald Seas, soon after departing the island. 20 shipboard firefighters fought the blaze before the arrival of the United States Coast Guard. Temporarily, 987 passengers were evacuated to the island and 17 passengers were treated for smoke inhalation.

== Tourism ==
Royal Caribbean Cruises Ltd., which owns Royal Caribbean International and Celebrity Cruises, assumed the lease of the island upon acquisition of Admiral Cruises in 1988. In 2019, the island was extensively renovated by Royal Caribbean at the cost of $250 million and renamed Perfect Day at CocoCay. Upon being announced in 2018, the renovation plans were criticised by activists, who raised concerns about harm to the environment and "natural beauty", and to small local businesses.

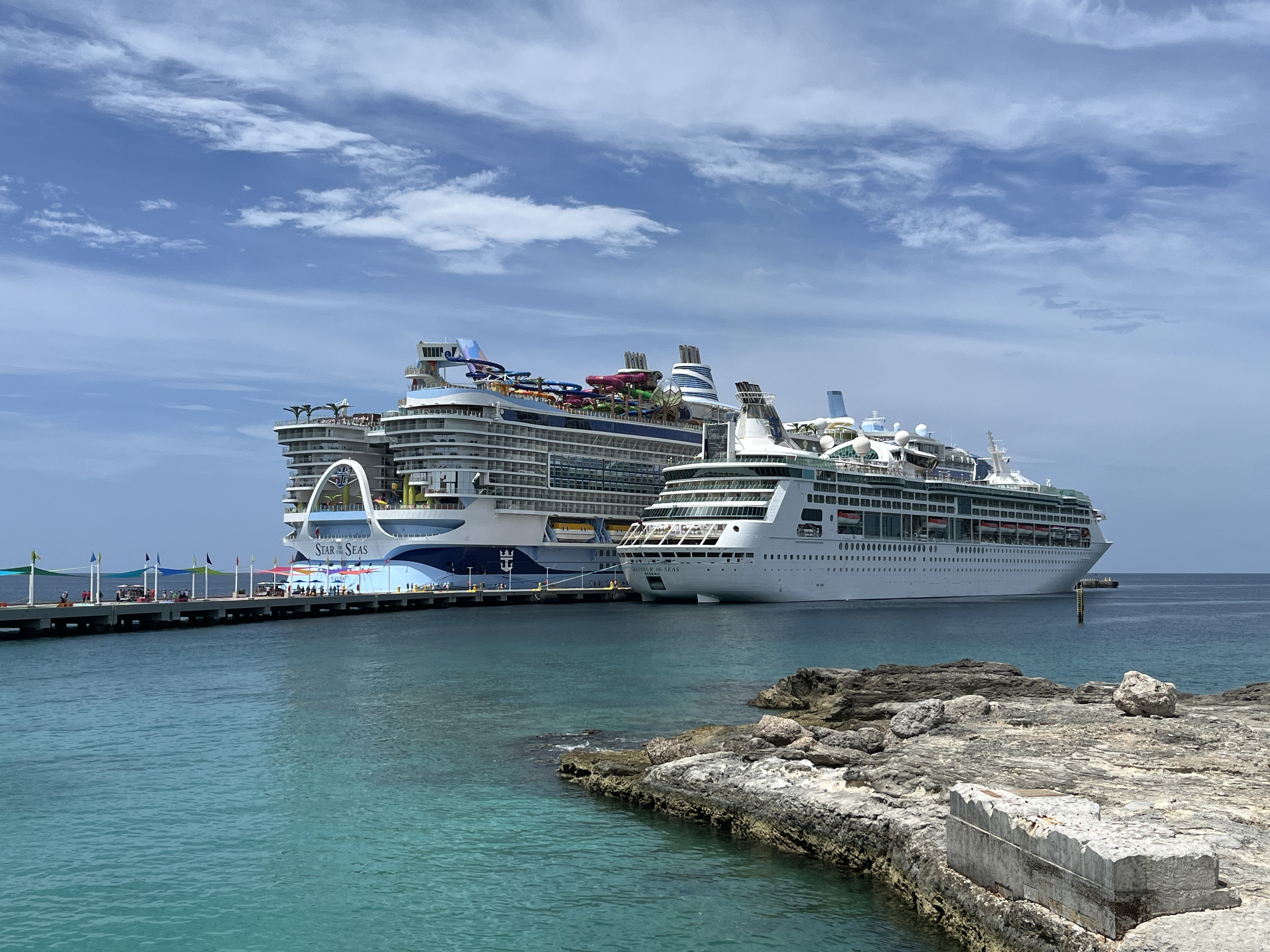
Star of the Seas and Grandeur of the Seas docked in CocoCay in August 2025

A pier was constructed on the north side of the island, which allows cruise ships to dock directly instead of using tenders. A waterpark was constructed on the "thrill" side of the island, with two towers containing waterslides, including North America's tallest. "Daredevil's Peak", and two pools. On the "chill" side is the beach with cabanas.

The east end is the centre of recreational activities with beaches fronting a coral basin where manatees, rays, and numerous fish can be seen. Nature trails run the entire length and width of the island.

== Climate ==
Climate data for CocoCay, Bahamas
Month	Jan	Feb	Mar	Apr	May	Jun	Jul	Aug	Sep	Oct	Nov	Dec	Year
Record high °F (°C)	90 (32)	91 (33)	91 (33)	91 (33)	96 (36)	98 (37)	97 (36)	99 (37)	97 (36)	95 (35)	91 (33)	89 (32)	99 (37)
Mean daily maximum °F (°C)	77 (25)	77 (25)	81 (27)	82 (28)	84 (29)	88 (31)	90 (32)	90 (32)	88 (31)	86 (30)	82 (28)	79 (26)	84 (29)
Mean daily minimum °F (°C)	63 (17)	63 (17)	64 (18)	66 (19)	70 (21)	73 (23)	75 (24)	75 (24)	75 (24)	72 (22)	68 (20)	64 (18)	69 (21)
Record low °F (°C)	46 (8)	45 (7)	50 (10)	54 (12)	59 (15)	61 (16)	63 (17)	67 (19)	67 (19)	59 (15)	54 (12)	48 (9)	45 (7)
Average precipitation inches (mm)	1.5 (38)	1.7 (43)	1.2 (30)	1.8 (46)	4.6 (120)	8.5 (220)	5.9 (150)	6.6 (170)	7.0 (180)	7.2 (180)	2.4 (61)	1.7 (43)	50.1 (1,270)
Average relative humidity (%)	75	73	72	71	73	76	74	75	77	76	74	75	74
Source 1:
Source 2:

== See also ==
- Ocean Cay – a similar small island used by MSC Cruises
- Private island
- Castaway Cay and Lookout Cay used by Disney Cruise Line as private ports.
