= Elbow Reef Lighthouse =

Lighthouse in the Bahamas

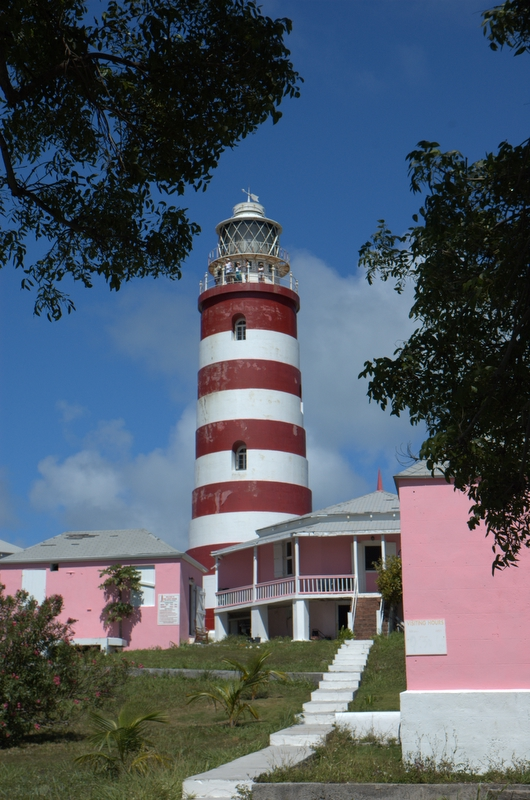
- The red and white striped lighthouse in Hope Town is a noted local landmark
- Location: Elbow Cay, The Bahamas
- Coordinates: 26°32′23″N 76°57′44″W

Tower
- Constructed: 1863
- Construction: masonry (tower)
- Height: 27 m (89 ft)
- Shape: conical tower with balcony
- Markings: Red and white (tower), white (lantern), grey (dome)
- Power source: kerosene
- Operator: Elbow Reef Lighthouse Society, owned by Ministry of Transportation and Local Government, The Bahamas

Light
- First lit: 1863
- Deactivated: temporarily by Hurricane Dorian
- Focal height: 37 m (121 ft)
- Lens: First order Fresnel (transferred from Gun Cay in 1936)
- Intensity: 325,000 candela
- Range: 23 nmi (43 km; 26 mi)
- Characteristic: Fl(5) W 15s

Elbow Reef Lighthouse is one of the last operational kerosene-fueled lighthouses in the world. This lighthouse on Elbow Cay in The Bahamas was built in 1862 opened September 1, 1863 it is striped horizontally red and white. Its light can be seen from 23 nmi (43 km) away.

The Elbow Reef Lighthouse is one of only three manual lighthouses left in the world. It has a weight mechanism that has to be hand cranked every few hours to maintain the sequence of five white flashes every 15 seconds. The lamp burns kerosene oil with a wick and mantle, at the rate of one gallon per night. The light is then focused as it passes through the optics of a first order Fresnel lens which floats on a bed of mercury.

The Elbow Reef Lighthouse Society, (a Bahamian non-profit) is responsible for keeping the site true to its historical past as a fully-working, non-automated, aid to navigation. Entrusted by the Ministry of Transportation and Local Government, (responsible for the Port Department and Maritime Affairs), The ERLS is the Elbow Reef Lightstation's infrastructural custodian, tasked with the oversight and ongoing preservation and restoration of the lighthouse and lightstation itself which comprises the lighthouse tower, two lighthouse keeper's quarters, six outbuildings, one gift shop and the wharf/dock.

== Keepers ==
Keeper	embarked	disembarked
Jeffrey Forbes (sr.), PK	??	??
Jackson Blatch, AK	2021	
