= Gun Cay =

Island in the Bahamas

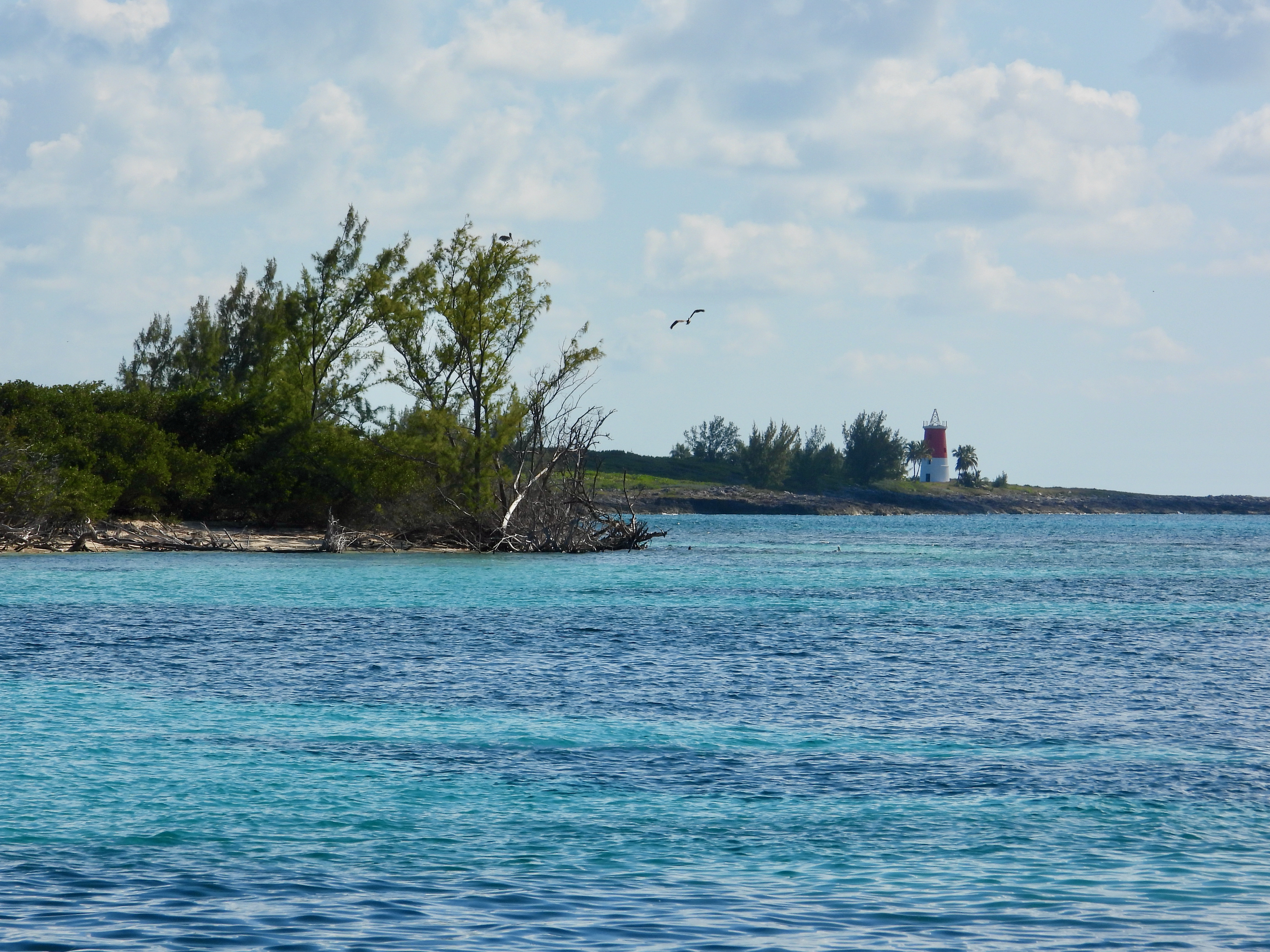
- View of Gun Cay from Honeymoon Harbour. The lighthouse is visible on the right.

- Location within Bahamas

Geography
- Location: Atlantic Ocean
- Coordinates: 25.584°N 79.300°W
- Type: Cay
- Archipelago: Lucayan Archipelago

Administration
- Bahamas

Gun Cay is an island in the Bahamas, located 9 mi (7.8 nmi; 14 km) south of Bimini. Gun Cay lighthouse was established in 1836.
