= Matthew Town =

- Settlement
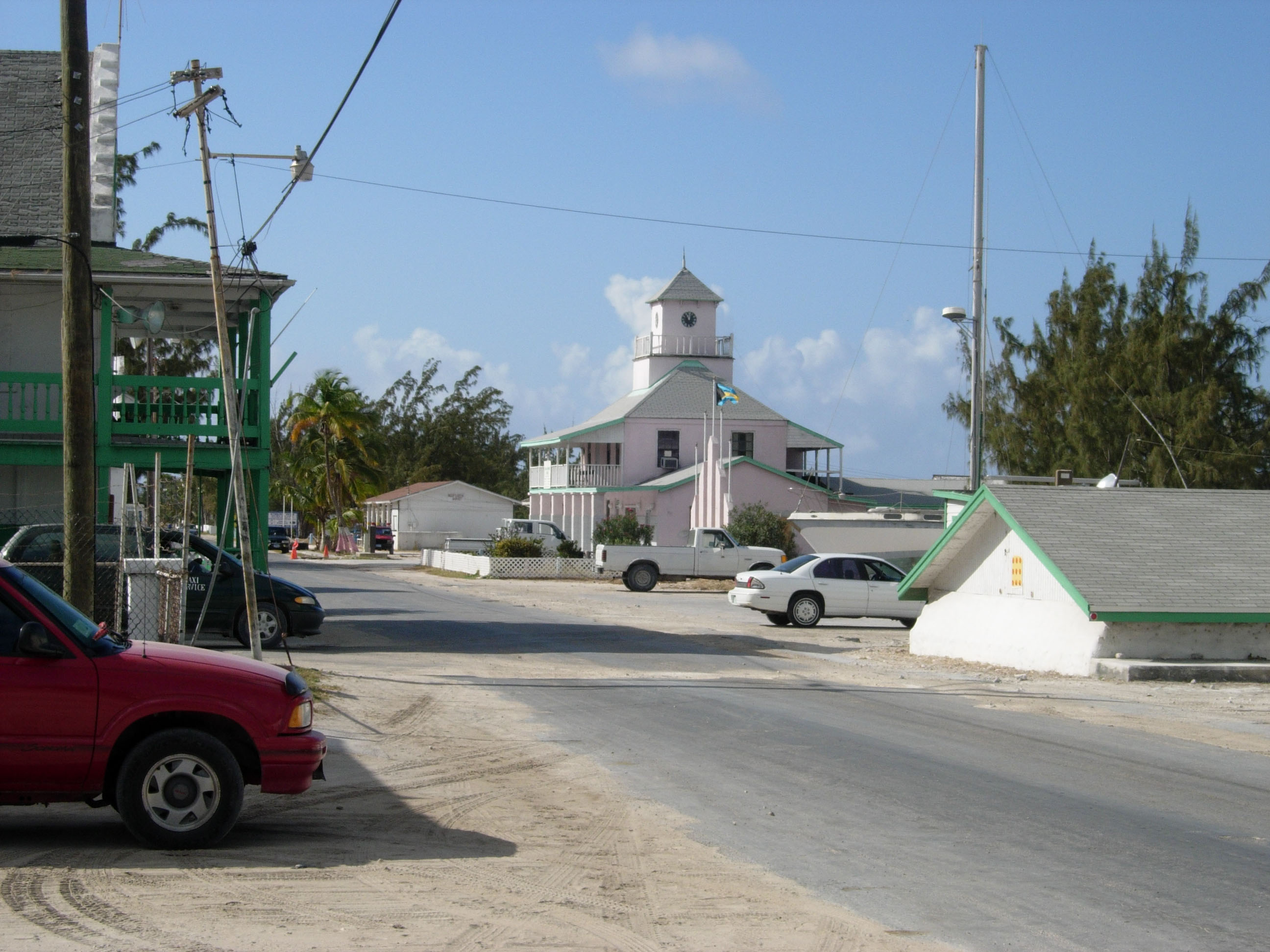

- Location within Bahamas
- Coordinates: 20°57′N 73°40′W
- Country: Bahamas
- Island: Great Inagua

Population (2012)
  - Total: 430
- Time zone: UTC-5 (Eastern Time Zone)
- Area code: 242
- Great Inagua Lighthouse; Southwest Point
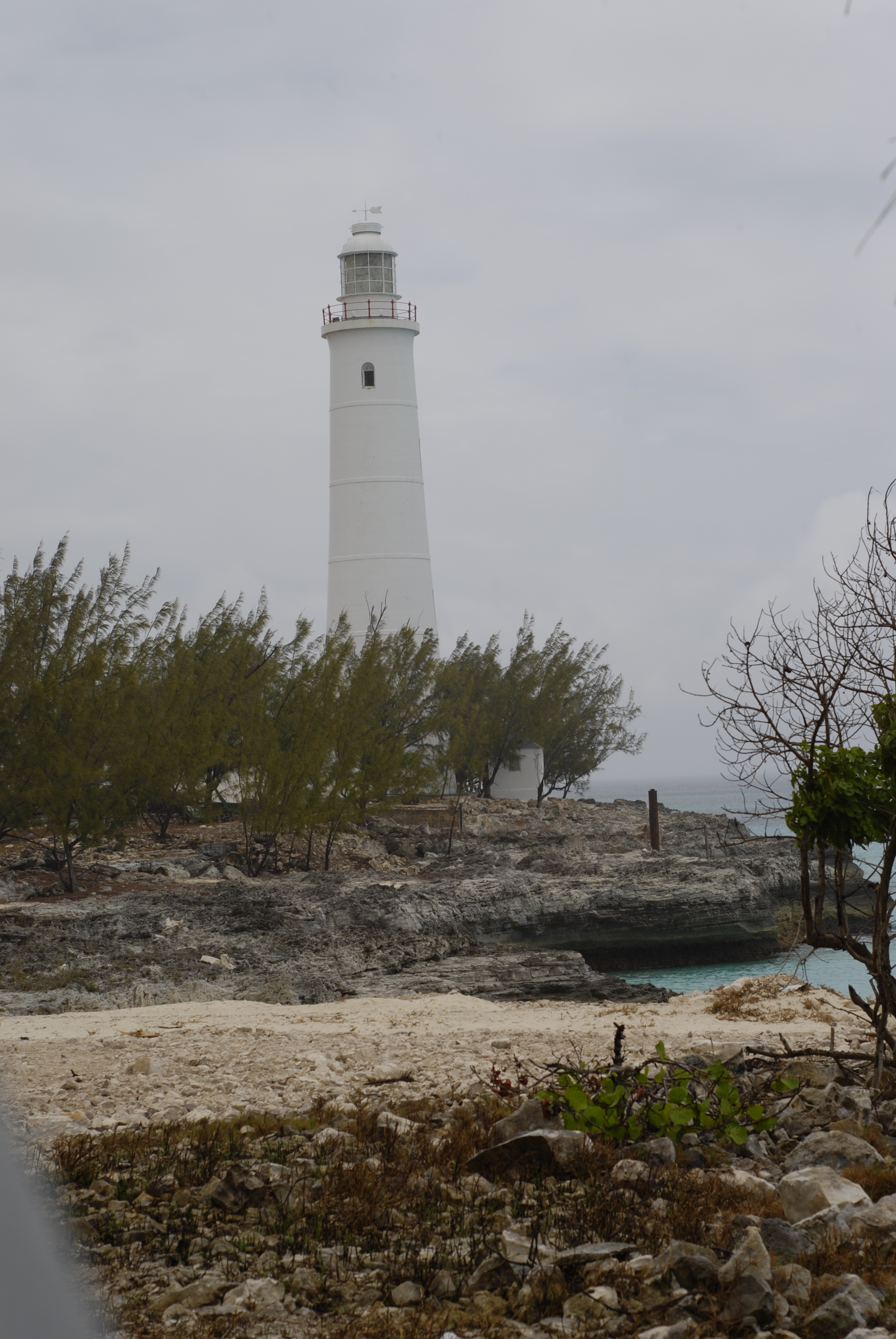
- Coordinates: 20°56′00.7″N 73°40′27.4″W
- Constructed: 1870
- Construction: masonry tower
- Height: 34 metres (112 ft)
- Shape: tapered cylindrical tower with balcony and lantern
- Markings: white tower and lantern
- Operator: Bahamas Port Department
- Focal height: 37 metres (121 ft)
- Range: 22 nautical miles (41 km; 25 mi)
- Characteristic: Fl (2) W 10s.

Matthew Town is the chief and only settlement on Great Inagua Island in the far south of the Bahamas. It is located on the southwest corner of the island. It was named after Bahamian Governor George Buckley-Mathew (1844–1849) and first settled during his tenure in office. It has several buildings dating to the 19th century including the 1870 Great Inagua Lighthouse.

Almost the entire population of Inagua resides in Matthew Town (approx. 1,000 people), and many of them are employed by the Morton Salt Company, (Note: In 2008 Morton's employed about 60% of the island's working population.) the island's largest employer.

== Climate ==
Matthew Town has a hot semi-arid climate (Köppen BSh), being much drier than the northern Bahamas as it lies further from the wet western side of the North Atlantic subtropical anticyclone. The wettest months are May and September to November.

Climate data for Matthew Town
Month	Jan	Feb	Mar	Apr	May	Jun	Jul	Aug	Sep	Oct	Nov	Dec	Year
Mean daily maximum °C (°F)	28.6 (83.5)	28.5 (83.3)	29.4 (84.9)	30.1 (86.2)	30.8 (87.4)	31.9 (89.4)	32.9 (91.2)	33.0 (91.4)	32.8 (91.0)	31.8 (89.2)	30.5 (86.9)	29.2 (84.6)	30.8 (87.4)
Daily mean °C (°F)	24.2 (75.6)	24.2 (75.6)	24.9 (76.8)	25.8 (78.4)	26.9 (80.4)	28.1 (82.6)	28.8 (83.8)	28.7 (83.7)	28.3 (82.9)	27.4 (81.3)	26.1 (79.0)	24.9 (76.8)	26.5 (79.7)
Mean daily minimum °C (°F)	19.9 (67.8)	20.0 (68.0)	20.4 (68.7)	21.4 (70.5)	22.9 (73.2)	24.3 (75.7)	24.6 (76.3)	24.4 (75.9)	23.8 (74.8)	23.1 (73.6)	21.8 (71.2)	20.5 (68.9)	22.3 (72.1)
Average rainfall mm (inches)	49.8 (1.96)	37.3 (1.47)	34.5 (1.36)	40.9 (1.61)	82.6 (3.25)	28.7 (1.13)	21.1 (0.83)	49.5 (1.95)	84.6 (3.33)	119.4 (4.70)	72.4 (2.85)	37.3 (1.47)	658.1 (25.91)
Average rainy days	6	5	4	5	6	4	4	5	7	10	8	6	70
Source: World Meteorological Organization

== See also ==
- List of lighthouses in the Bahamas
