= List of islands of The Bahamas =

Overview of Bahamian islands

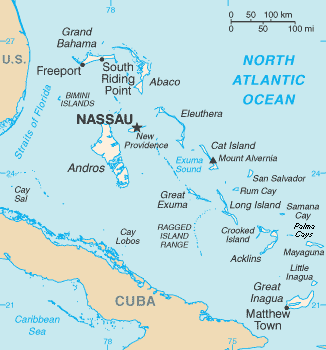
A map of The Bahamas

The following is a list of the islands and cays of the Commonwealth of The Bahamas.

Name	Area	Population	Notes
Abner Cay			
Abraham's Bay			
Acklins Island	508 km^{2} (196 sq mi)	676	
Adderley Cay			
Alcorine Cay			
Alder Cay			
Allan Cays			
Allans Cay			
Ambergris Cay (Abaco Islands)			
Ambergris Cay (Berry Islands)			
Andrew Island			
Angel Cays			
Angle and Fish Cay			
Anna Cay			
Arawak Cay			
Araway Cay			
Archers Cay			
Athol Island			
Atwood Cay			
August Cay			
Back Cay			
Bahama Cay			
Bahama Island			
Bamboo Cay			
Barraterre Island			
Barn Cay			
Barracuda Island			
Base Line Cay			
Beach Cay			
Beacon Cay			
Beak Cay			
Bell Cay			Owned by Aga Khan IV
Ben Cay			
Big Bersus Cay			
Big Carters Cay			
Big Cave Cay			
Big Cay			
Big Crab Cay			
Big Cross Cay			
Big Darby Island			Private island in the Exumas
Big Egg Island			
Big Farmer's Cay			
Big Fish Cay			
Big Grand Cay			
Big Harbour Cay			
Big Hog Cay			
Big Jerry Cay			
Big Joe Downer Cay			
Big Lake Cay			
Big Lloyd Cay			
Big Major Cay			
Big Pigeon Cay			
Big Romers Cay			
Big Thrift Harbour Cay			
Big Whale Cay			
Big Wood Cay			
Billy Cay			
Bird Cay			
Bitter Guana Cay			
Black Island			
Bock Cat Cay			
Bob Cay			
Bock Cay			
Bonds Cay			
Bonefish Cay			
Booby Cay			
Bowe Cay			
Bridges Cay			
Brigantine Cays			
Brown Cay			
Brush Cay			
Buena Vista Cay			
Burnside Cay			
Burroughs Cay			
Burrow Cay			
Bursis Cay			
Buttonwood Cay			
Cabbage Cay			
Caeser Cay			
Calabash Cay			
Cambridge Cay			
Candle Cays			
Carter Cay			
Cashs Cay			
Castaway Cay, formerly Gorda Cay			Private island and an exclusive port for Disney Cruise Line
Castle Island			
Cat Island	387 km^{2} (149 sq mi)	1,570	
Cat Cay			
Catch Island			
Catto Cay			
Cave Cay			Private island in the Exumas
Cay Lobos			Nearest point of The Bahamas to Cuba (Cayo Confites): 22.5 km (14 mi))
Cay One			
Cay Sal Bank			
Cay Santo Domingo			
Cay With Low Fall			
Caye a Rum			
Caye de Sel			
Channel Cay(s)			
Children's Bay Cay			
Chub Cay			
Cistern Cay			
Clem Cay			
Cluffs Cay			
Coakley Cay			
Cockroach Cay			
Cocoa Cay			
CocoCay, formerly Little Stirrup Cay			Private island leased by Royal Caribbean Cruises Ltd.
Cocoa Plum Cay			
Comfort Cay			
Compass Cay			
Cold Cay			
Conception Island			
Conchshell Cay			
Cook's Cay			
Cormorant Cay			
Cornish Cay			
Cotton Bay Cay			
Cotton Cay			
Crab Cay			
Crisby Island			
Crooked Island	282 km^{2} (109 sq mi)	293	
Cross Cay(s)			
Culmer's Cay			
Cupid's Cay			
Curly Cut Cays			
Current Island			
East Cay			
Egg Island			
Elbow Cay			
Elbow Cays (Cay Sal Bank)			
Eleuthera Island	457 km^{2} (176 sq mi)	9,104	
Elizabeth Island			
Exuma Island	204 km^{2} (79 sq mi)	7,287 (Exuma and Cays)	
Factory Cays			
Falcon Cays			
Fanny Cay			
Fernandez Cay			
Fiddle Cay			
Fifteen Feet Cay			
Finley Cay			
Fish Cay(s)			
Fish Hawk Cay			
Fishing Cays			
Flamingo Cay			
Flat Cays			
Foots Cay			
Fortune Island			
Fowl Cay			
Fraizer's Hog Cay			
French Cay(s)			
Frog Cay			
Frozen Cay			
Galliot Cay			
Garden Cay			
Gaulding Cay			
Gaulin Cay			
Geouge Island			
Gibson Cay			
Gibson Hog Cay			
Ginger Cay			
Glass Cay			
Goat Cay (Berry Islands)			
Goat Cay (Exuma district)			
Gold Cay			
Gold Ring Cay			
Goole Cay			
Goulding Cay			
Grand Bahama	1,096 km^{2} (423 sq mi)	46,740	
Grand Cay(s)			
Great Abaco	1,146 km^{2} (442 sq mi)	16,695	
Great Cistern Cay			
Great Exuma Island			
Great Guana Cay			
Great Guano Cay			
Great Harbour Cay			
Great Inagua Island	1,615 km^{2} (624 sq mi)	831 (both Little and Grand Inagua)	
Great Isaac Cay			
Great Ragged Island			
Great Sale Cay			
Great Seal Cay			
Great Stirrup Cay			Private island of Norwegian Cruise Line
Green Cay			
Green Turtle Cay			
Griffins Cay			
Grunt Cay			
Guanahani Cay			
Guana Cay			
Guincho Ginger Cay			
Guinchos Cay			29 km (18 miles) from Cuba
Gun Cay			
Gut Island			
Haines Cay			
Halls Pond Cay			Private island in the Exumas, also known as Spectabilis Island
Harbour Island		1,843	
Harvey Cay			
Harvey Cays			
Hawksbill Cays			
Hawksnest Cay			
Heneagua Island			
High Cay			
High Point Cay			
High Ridge Cay			
Highbourne Cay			
Hoffman Cay			
Hog Cay (Exuma)			
Hog Cay (Long Island)			
Hog Cay (Ragged Island)			
Holmes Cay			
India Cay			
Iron Cay			
Ishmael Cay			
Jamaica Cay			
James Cay			
Jewfish Cay			
Joe Cays			
Joe Creek Island			
Joe Downer Cays			
John Downer Cays			
Johnny's Cay			
Johnsons Cay			
Josephs Cay			
Joulter Cays			
Jumento Cays			
Kamalame Cay			
Kemp Cay			
Kits Cay			
Knife Cay			
Lanzadera Cay			
Laughing Bird Cay			
Leaf Cay			Site of Leaf Cay Airport (MYXD), a private airstrip.
Lee Stocking Island			
Leonard Cay			
Levi Island			
Lightbourn's Cay			
Lighthouse Point			
Lignumvitae Cay			
Linder Cay			
Little Abaco Island	78 km^{2} (30 sq mi)		
Little Bell Cay			
Little Bersus Cay			
Little Carters Island			
Little Cat Island			
Little Cave Cay			
Little Cay			
Little Cistern Cay			
Little Crab Cay			
Little Darby Island			
Little Exuma Island			
Little Farmer's Cay			
Little Grand Cay			
Little Guana Cay			
Little Cuana Cay			
Little Harbour Cay			
Little Inagua Island	126 km^{2} (49 sq mi)	831 (both Little and Grand Inagua)	Little Inagua National Park
Little Island			
Little Joe Downer Cay			
Little Lloyd Cay			
Little Major's Island			
Little Nurse Cay			
Little Petit Cay			
Little Pimlico Cay			
Little Pipe Cay			Private island in the Exumas
Little Ragged Island			
Little Romers Cay			
Little Sale Cay			
Little San Salvador or Half Moon Cay			Private island owned by Carnival Corporation
Little Walker Cay			
Little Wax Cay			
Little Whale Cay			
Lizard Cay			
Lobster Cay			
Lockhart Cay			
Loggerhead Cay			
Lone Pine Cay			
Long Cay			
Long Island	538 km^{2} (208 sq mi)	2,718	
Lovely Bay Cays			
Low Cay			
Low Water Harbour Cay			
Lower Crisby Cay			
Lubbers Quarters Cay			
Lucian Cay			
Lyford Cay			
Lynyard Cay			
Madam Dau's Cay			
Madeira Cay			
Major's Island			
Mamma Rhonda Cay			
Man Head Cay			
Man Island			
Man-O-War Cay(s)			
Mangrove Cay		7,695 (all of Andros)	North Andros, Mangrove Cay, and South Andros are often grouped together as "Andros"
Mangrove Island			
Manjack Cay			
Margaret Cay			
Marine Cay			
Market Fish Cays			
Mary Cays			
Mastic Cay			
Mat Lowe's Cay			
Mayaguana	293 km^{2} (113 sq mi)	203	
Maycock Cay			
Meeks Patch Island			
Melita Cay			
Michael's Cay			
Middle Cay			
Middle Bight Cay			
Mira Por Vos Islands			
Molley Sanders Island			
Money Cay			
Moore's Island			
Moosha Cay			
Moraine Cay			
Moriah Harbour Cay			
Mouth Of Harbou Cay			
Muertos Cays			
Musha Cay			
Nairn Cay			
New Cay			
New Providence	228 km^{2} (88 sq mi)	296,732	
Newton Cay			
Noah Bethel Cays			
Noname Cay			
Norman's Cay			Headquarters for Carlos Lehder's drug-smuggling operation from 1978 to around 1982
Norman's Pond Cay			
North Andros	3,439 km^{2} (1,328 sq mi)	7,695 (all of Andros)	North Andros, Mangrove Cay, and South Andros are often grouped together as "Andros"
North Bimini			
North Cat Cay			
North Cay			
North Elbow Cay			
North Halls Cay			
Northern Eleuthera			
Northwest Cay			
Noss Mangrove Island			
Nun Jack Cay			
Nurse Cay			
Nurse Channel Cay			
Nassau			
O'Brien Cay			
Ocean Cay			
Old Yankee Cay			
Orange Cay			
Outer Point Cay			
Over Yonder Cay			
Oyster Cay			
Paradise Island			
Parrot Cays			
Paw Paw Cay			
Peace and Plenty Island			
Pear Cay			
Pelican Cays			
Pensacola Cays			
Perpall's Cay			
Petit Cay			
Piana Cays			
Pierre Island			
Pigeon Cays			
Pimlico Cays			
Pimlico Island(s)			
Pine Cay			
Pine Tree Cay			
Pineapple Cays			
Pipe Cay			
Plana Cay			
Plum Cays			
Pot Cay			
Potter Cay			
Powell Cay			
Prime Cay			
Pumpion Cay			
Racoon Cay			
Ragged Island		56	
Rainbow Cay			
Randall's Cay			
Rat Cay			
Ratman Cay			
Ratmans Cay			
Red Shank Cay			
Reid Cay			
Rock Harbour Cays			
Roker Cay			
Rose Island			
Royal Island			
Rudder Cut Cay			Private island with an airstrip in the Exumas, owned by illusionist David Copperfield
Rum Cay	85 km^{2} (33 sq mi)	87	
Russell Island			
Saddle Back Cay			
Saddle Cay			
Sailor's Choice Cay			
Sales Cay			
Salt Cay, Bahamas			
Salt Pond Cay			
Samama Cays			
Samana Cay	39 km^{2} (15 sq mi)		
Samphire Cay			
Samphire Cays			
Sampson Cay			Private island owned by John C. Malone.
San Salvador	162 km^{2} (63 sq mi)	819	
Sand Bank Cays			
Sanders Island			
Sandy Cay			
Sandy Harbour Cay			
Sapodilla Cay			
Schooner Cays			
Scotland Cay			
Scrub Cays			
Seal Cay			
Sheep Cay			
Ship Channel Cay			
Shroud Cays			
Silver Cay			
Simms Cay			
Sister Cays			
Siur Cay			
Six Shilling Cays			
Smith Cay			
Snake Cay			
Snapper Cay			
Soldier Cays			
South Andros	1,448 km^{2} (559 sq mi)	7,695 (all of Andros)	North Andros, Mangrove Cay, and South Andros are often grouped together as "Andros"
South Bimini			
South Cat Cay			
South Cay			
South Channel Cay			
South Spot Cay			
South Mangrove Cays			
South Stirrup Cay			
Southeast Cay			
Southern Cay			
Spanish Cay			
Spanish Wells Cay		1,453	
St. George's Caye			
Staniard Cay			
Staniel Cay			
Steamer Cay			
Stocking Island			
Strachan Cay			
Stranger Cay			
Sugar Loaf Cay			
Sun Cay			
Sweetings Cay			
Tarzan Cay			
Tear Coat Cay			
Tee Cay			
Thatch Cays			
Thomas Cay			
Thompson Cay			
Tilloo Cay			
Top Cay			
Torch Cay, Exuma			
Tumar Cay			
Turner Cay			
Twin Cays			
Upper Cay			
Upper Channel Cay			
Upper Samphier Cay			
Upper Sandy Harbour Cay			
Verd Key			
Victory Cays			
Vigilant Cay			
Warderick Wells Cay			
Walker's Cay			
Water Cay(s)			
Watling Island			
Wax Cay			
Weatherford Cay			
Well Cay			
West Cay			
West Shroud Cay			
Wet Cay			
Whale Cay			
White Bay Cay			
White Cay			
William Cay			
William Island			
Willis Cay			
Wilson Cay			
Wiltshires Cay			
Windermere Island			
Wood Cay			
Woolen Dean Cay			
Yellow Cay			
Young Cay			
Yuma Island			

== See also ==
- The Bahamas
  - Geography of the Bahamas
  - Districts of the Bahamas
  - List of cities in the Bahamas
  - List of Bahamas-related topics
- Lucayan Archipelago
- List of islands by area
- List of islands by highest point
- List of islands by population
- List of islands in lakes
