= Geography of the Bahamas =

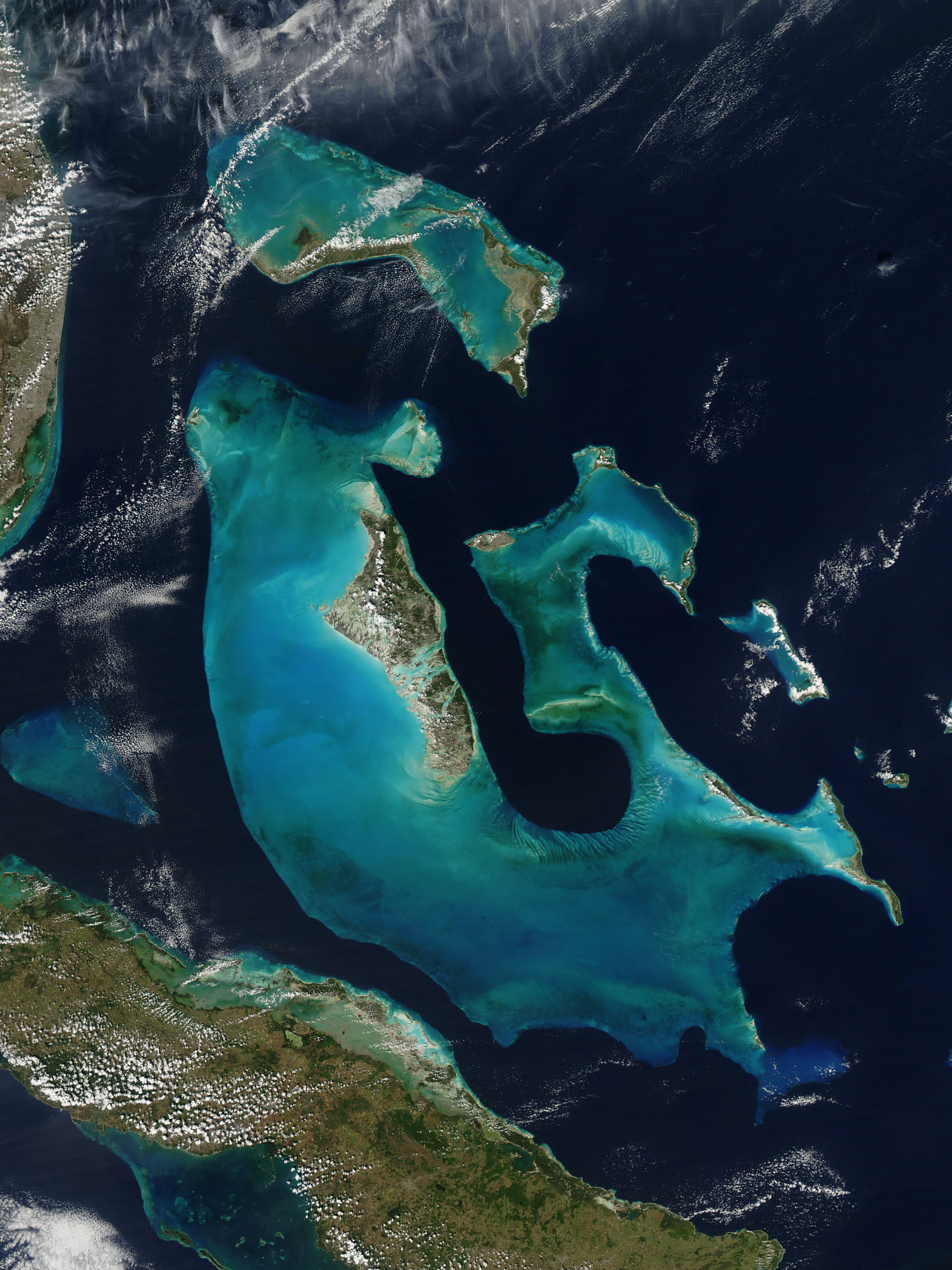
- Continent: North America
- Region: Atlantic Ocean
- Area: Ranked 155th
  - Total: 13,878 km^{2} (5,358 sq mi)
  - Land: 72.12%
  - Water: 27.88%
- Coastline: 3,542 km (2,201 mi)
- Borders: None
- Highest point: Cat Island; 63 metres (207 ft)
- Lowest point: Atlantic Ocean; 0 m
- Exclusive economic zone: 654,715 km^{2} (252,787 mi^{2})

This short video shows moist clouds over the island of Cuba and the Bahamas as the ISS flies from the Caribbean Sea north-east to the Atlantic Ocean. In the video, Cuba is mostly covered by clouds, but the reefs in the Bahamas stand out.

The Bahamas are a group of about 700 islands and cays in the western Atlantic Ocean, of which only between 30 and 40 are inhabited. The largest of the islands is Andros Island, located north of Cuba and 200 kilometres (120 miles) southeast of Florida. The Bimini islands are to its northwest. To the North is the island of Grand Bahama, home to the second-largest city in the country, Freeport. The island of Great Abaco is to its east. In the far south is the island of Great Inagua, the second-largest island in the country. Other notable islands include Eleuthera, Cat Island, San Salvador Island, Acklins, Crooked Island, and Mayaguana. Nassau is the capital and largest city, located on New Providence. The islands have a tropical savannah climate, moderated by the Gulf Stream. The total size is 13,878 km^{2} (5,358 mi^{2}). Due to the many widespread islands it has the 41st largest Exclusive Economic Zone of 654,715 km^{2} (252,787 mi^{2}).

The islands are surface projections of two oceanic Bahama Banks - the Little Bahama Bank and the Great Bahama Bank. The highest point is only 63 metres (207 feet) above sea level on Cat Island; the island of New Providence, where the capital city of Nassau is located, reaches a maximum elevation of only thirty-seven meters. The land on the Bahamas has a foundation of fossil coral, but much of the rock is oolitic limestone; the stone is derived from the disintegration of coral reefs and seashells. The land is primarily either rocky or mangrove swamp. Low scrub covers much of the surface area. Pineyards are found on four of the northern islands: Grand Bahama, Great Abaco, New Providence, and Andros. On some of the southern islands, low-growing tropical hardwood flourishes. Although some soil is very fertile, it is also very thin. Only a few freshwater lakes and just one river, located on Andros Island, are found in the Bahamas.

== Climate ==
Wettest tropical cyclones and their remnants in the Bahamas Highest-known totals
Precipitation			Storm	Location	Ref.
Rank	mm	in	Storm	Location	Ref.
1	747.5	29.43	Noel 2007	Long Island	
2	580.1	22.84	Dorian 2019	Hope Town	
3	500.3	19.70	Matthew 2016	Matthew Town, Inagua	
4	436.6	17.19	Flora 1963	Duncan Town	
5	390.1	15.36	Inez 1966	Nassau Airport	
6	337.1	13.27	Fox 1952	New Providence	
7	321.1	12.64	Michelle 2001	Nassau	
8	309.4	12.18	Erin 1995	Church Grove	
9	260.0	9.88	Fay 2008	Freeport	
10	236.7	9.32	Floyd 1999	Little Harbor Abacos	

The Bahamas map of Köppen climate classification.

The climate of the Bahama islands is mostly tropical savanna, with two seasons, a hot and wet summer (wet season) and dry winter (dry season).

During the wet season, which extends from May through October, the climate is dominated by warm, moist tropical air masses as the Bermuda High brings a southeasterly flow from the deep tropics. Daily high temperatures are in the 31 °C (87.8 °F) range, with a dew point temperatures in the 75–77 °F (23.9–25.0 °C) range, creating the typical hot and sultry island weather. Brief but intense thundershowers are common with thunder and lightning. In the wet season, tropical storms and weak tropical lows may also contribute to the seasonal rainfall.

In the dry season, extending from November through April, the subtropical high retreats, and a mix of drier northeast trade winds and occasional westerlies coming down from the North American mainland impact the Bahamas. Sunny, arid conditions prevail in the Bahamas in the dry season, and at times drought conditions can impact farming and agriculture. High temperatures during the dry season are in the 25 °C (77.0 °F) range.

Annual rainfall averages 132 centimetres (52 in) and is usually concentrated in the May–June and September–October periods. Rainfall often occurs in short-lived, fairly intense, but brief thundershowers accompanied by strong gusty winds, followed by a return to clear skies.

Winds are predominantly easterly throughout the year but tend to become northeasterly from October to April and southeasterly from May to September. These winds seldom exceed twenty-four kilometres per hour except during hurricane season. Although the hurricane season officially lasts from June to November, most hurricanes in the Bahamas occur between July and October. The strongest storm to strike the country was Hurricane Andrew in 1992, until Hurricane Dorian struck in 2019. Damage was estimated at US$250 million and mainly affected agricultural products.

The most intense hurricane to strike the Bahamas was Hurricane Dorian in 2019, with wind gusts of up to 355 kilometres per hour (221 mph) being recorded. 84 people died (74 of whom were from the Bahamas), and there was catastrophic damage to buildings, homes, and boats, and sometimes complete destruction. Preliminary damage estimates are in the US$7 billion range.

Climate data for Nassau (Lynden Pindling International Airport), elevation: 7 m or 23 ft, extremes 1980-2012
Month	Jan	Feb	Mar	Apr	May	Jun	Jul	Aug	Sep	Oct	Nov	Dec	Year
Record high °C (°F)	32.1 (89.8)	33.0 (91.4)	33.0 (91.4)	34.0 (93.2)	38.0 (100.4)	38.0 (100.4)	36.0 (96.8)	39.9 (103.8)	36.0 (96.8)	35.0 (95.0)	33.0 (91.4)	32.0 (89.6)	39.9 (103.8)
Mean daily maximum °C (°F)	25.6 (78.1)	26.1 (79.0)	26.9 (80.4)	28.1 (82.6)	29.9 (85.8)	31.4 (88.5)	32.4 (90.3)	32.4 (90.3)	31.9 (89.4)	30.2 (86.4)	27.9 (82.2)	26.4 (79.5)	29.1 (84.4)
Daily mean °C (°F)	21.6 (70.9)	21.9 (71.4)	22.7 (72.9)	23.9 (75.0)	25.8 (78.4)	27.7 (81.9)	28.5 (83.3)	28.5 (83.3)	27.9 (82.2)	26.6 (79.9)	24.5 (76.1)	22.6 (72.7)	25.2 (77.4)
Mean daily minimum °C (°F)	17.4 (63.3)	17.9 (64.2)	18.6 (65.5)	19.8 (67.6)	21.6 (70.9)	23.6 (74.5)	24.4 (75.9)	24.4 (75.9)	24.1 (75.4)	23.0 (73.4)	20.9 (69.6)	18.9 (66.0)	21.2 (70.2)
Record low °C (°F)	6.0 (42.8)	7.0 (44.6)	7.0 (44.6)	9.0 (48.2)	9.0 (48.2)	15.0 (59.0)	17.0 (62.6)	18.0 (64.4)	18.0 (64.4)	15.0 (59.0)	11.0 (51.8)	7.6 (45.7)	6.0 (42.8)
Average precipitation mm (inches)	49 (1.9)	50 (2.0)	65 (2.6)	63 (2.5)	115 (4.5)	223 (8.8)	150 (5.9)	217 (8.5)	182 (7.2)	137 (5.4)	79 (3.1)	52 (2.0)	1,382 (54.4)
Average precipitation days (≥ 1.0 mm)	8	6	7	6	10	15	17	18	17	14	9	8	135
Mean monthly sunshine hours	226	224	251	282	282	240	267	260	222	236	219	211	2,920
Source 1: Ogimet
Source 2: Climatebase.ru (extremes)

Average sea temperature at Nassau
Jan	Feb	Mar	Apr	May	Jun	Jul	Aug	Sep	Oct	Nov	Dec
73 °F 23 °C	73 °F 23 °C	75 °F 24 °C	79 °F 26 °C	81 °F 27 °C	82 °F 28 °C	82 °F 28 °C	82 °F 28 °C	82 °F 28 °C	81 °F 27 °C	79 °F 26 °C	75 °F 24 °C

Climate data for Freeport (1971-2000)
Month	Jan	Feb	Mar	Apr	May	Jun	Jul	Aug	Sep	Oct	Nov	Dec	Year
Mean daily maximum °C (°F)	24.3 (75.8)	24.4 (75.9)	25.8 (78.4)	27.4 (81.3)	29.7 (85.4)	31.2 (88.2)	32.2 (90.0)	32.3 (90.2)	31.7 (89.0)	29.7 (85.4)	27.3 (81.2)	25.1 (77.2)	28.4 (83.2)
Mean daily minimum °C (°F)	15.9 (60.7)	15.6 (60.0)	17.5 (63.5)	19.2 (66.6)	21.1 (69.9)	23.2 (73.8)	23.9 (75.1)	23.9 (75.1)	23.3 (74.0)	21.4 (70.5)	19.4 (66.9)	17.0 (62.6)	20.1 (68.2)
Average precipitation mm (inches)	83.1 (3.27)	72.6 (2.86)	93.5 (3.68)	66.8 (2.63)	104.7 (4.12)	176.0 (6.93)	165.4 (6.51)	207.8 (8.18)	217.4 (8.56)	142.8 (5.62)	93.0 (3.66)	73.7 (2.90)	1,496.8 (58.92)
Average rainy days	10	9	9	7	12	17	18	19	19	16	11	10	157
Mean monthly sunshine hours	217	226	279	270	279	270	279	279	240	248	210	217	3,014
Mean daily sunshine hours	7	8	9	9	9	9	9	9	8	8	7	7	8
Percentage possible sunshine	65	71	75	70	67	65	66	69	65	70	65	67	68
Average ultraviolet index	5	7	9	10	11	11	11	11	10	8	6	5	9
Source 1: WMO
Source 2: Weather Atlas (rain days, sun, and uv)

=== Climate change ===
Climate change is causing temperature increases in the Bahamas. The average temperature has increased by approximately 0.5 °C since 1960. The rate of the temperature increase varies seasonally, with average daily maximum temperatures for July recently increasing at a rate of 2.6 °C per 100 years. Global temperature rise of 2 °C above preindustrial levels can increase the likelihood of extreme hurricane rainfall by four to five times in the Bahamas. The IPCC expects the 20-year average global temperature to exceed +1.5 °C in the early 2030s.

The Bahamas is expected to be highly affected by sea level rise because at least 80% of the total land is below 10 meters elevation. As a small island developing state, the Bahamas is vulnerable to escalating disease outbreaks, and climate change could affect the seasonality of outbreaks and transmission of disease.

Although the country's greenhouse gas emissions are comparatively small (2.94 million tonnes of green house gases emitted in 2023), the Bahamas is reliant on imported fossil fuels for energy generation. The government plans to increase solar energy capacity to 30% of the country's total energy production by 2033. The Bahamas has pledged to reduce its emissions by 30% by 2030, if international support is received.

== Geography ==
=== Location ===
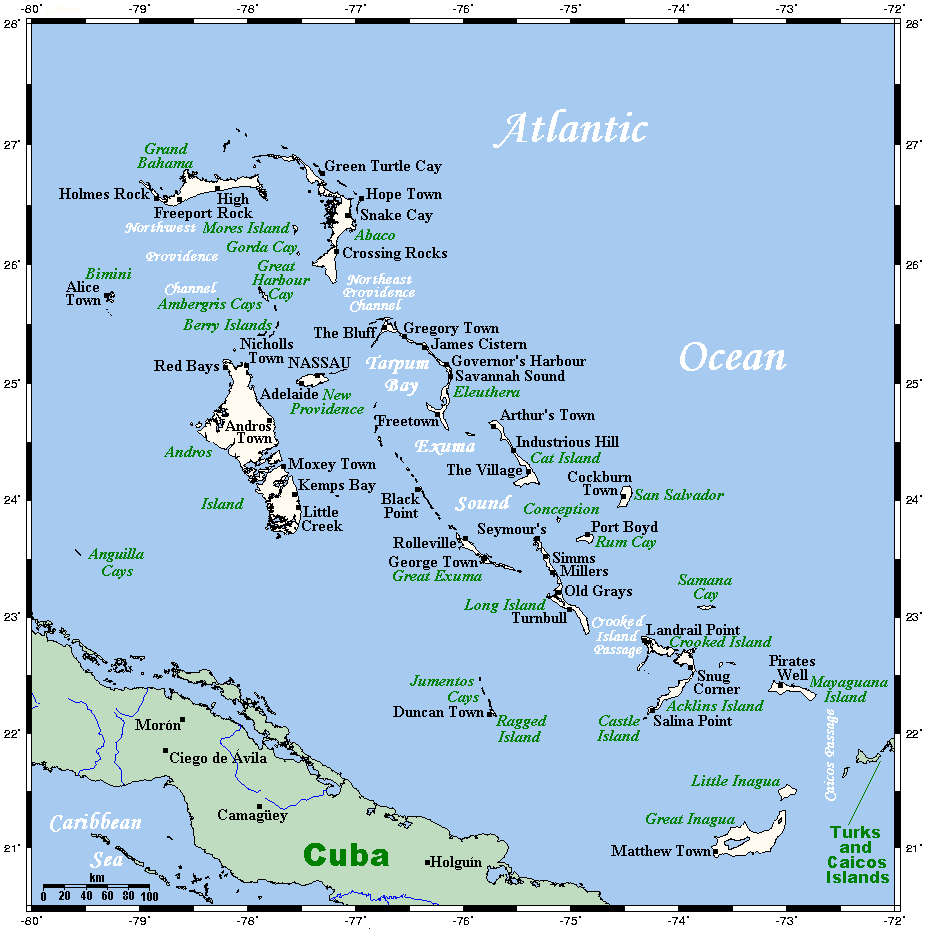
Map of the Bahamas

Atlantic Ocean, chain islands in the North Atlantic Ocean, southeast of Florida, northeast of Cuba and northwest of the Turks and Caicos Islands.

Geographic coordinates (capital city Nassau): 25°4′N 77°20′W

=== Area ===
- total: 13,880 km^{2}

county comparison to the world: 161

- land: 3865 square miles; 10,010 km^{2}
- water: 3,870 km^{2}

==== Area comparative ====
- Australia comparative: 6 times larger than the Australian Capital Territory
- Canada comparative: a little over twice the size of Prince Edward Island
- Poland comparative: slightly smaller than Świętokrzyskie Voivodeship
- United Kingdom comparative: slightly smaller than Northern Ireland
- United States comparative: slightly smaller than Connecticut
- France comparative: slightly larger than Île-de-France
- The Philippines comparative: slightly larger than Ilocos Region
- Germany comparative: slightly smaller than Schleswig-Holstein
- Russia comparative: slightly smaller than Karachay-Cherkess Republic
- Indonesia comparative: slightly smaller than North Sulawesi
- Ivory Coast comparative: slightly smaller than Comoé District

=== Land ===
==== Natural resources ====
- salt, limestone, timber, arable land

==== Land use ====
- arable land: 0.8%
- permanent crops: 0.04%
- other: 98.8% (2012)

==== Coastline ====
- 3,542 kilometres (2,201 mi)
- A recent global remote sensing analysis suggested that there were 1,354 km² of tidal flats in the Bahamas, making it the 24th ranked country in terms of tidal flat area.

==== Sea territory ====
- 654,715 km^{2} (252,787 mi^{2})

==== Terrain ====
- The terrain consists of long, flat coral formations with some low rounded hills.

==== Extreme points ====
- Northernmost point – Walker's Cay, Abaco Islands
- Southernmost point – Matthew Town Great Inagua island
- Westernmost point – Elbow Cays, Bimini
- Easternmost point – Mayaguana Island
- Lowest point – Atlantic Ocean 0 m
- Highest point – Mount Alvernia: 63 m
- Closest point to Cuba - Cay Lobos 22.5 km (14 mi)

==== Irrigated land ====
- 10 km^{2} (2003)

==== Total renewable water resources ====
- 0.02 km^{3} (2011)

==== Landforms ====
As an island nation, the Bahamas is made up of numerous archipelagos, beaches, straits, blue holes, and other landforms. The tallest mountain is Mount Alvernia, at only 207 feet above sea level. Notable bodies of water include Dean's Blue Hole, Lake Rosa, and the Goose River. The Bahamas also contains many creeks.

=== Environment ===
==== Forests ====
In the Bahamas forest cover is around 51% of the total land area, equivalent to 509,860 hectares (ha) of forest in 2020, which was unchanged from 1990. In 2020, naturally regenerating forest covered 509,860 hectares (ha) and planted forest covered 0 hectares (ha). Of the naturally regenerating forest 0% was reported to be primary forest (consisting of native tree species with no clearly visible indications of human activity) and around 0% of the forest area was found within protected areas. For the year 2015, 80% of the forest area was reported to be under public ownership, 20% private ownership and 0% with ownership listed as other or unknown.

==== Natural hazards ====
- Hurricanes and other tropical storms that cause extensive flood and wind damage

==== Environment - Current issues ====
- Coral reef decay
- Solid waste disposal

==== Environment - International agreements ====
Party to these agreements:

- Biodiversity, Climate Change, Climate Change-Kyoto Protocol, Desertification, Endangered Species, Hazardous Wastes, Law of the Sea, Ozone Layer Protection, Ship Pollution, Wetl

==== Geography - note ====
- The Bahamas is strategically located adjacent to the United States and Cuba (Cay Confites to 14 miles).
- The Bahamas is an extensive island chain of which 30 islands are inhabited.

== See also ==
- List of islands of the Bahamas
- Wikimedia Atlas of the Bahamas
