= Hog Cay =

Hog Cay may refer to:

- Hog Cay, Exuma, an island of the Bahamas
- Hog Cay, Long Island, an island of the Bahamas
  - Hog Cay Airstrip, located on the island
- Hog Cay, Ragged Island, an island of the Bahamas
- Hog Cay, Caicos, an island off South Caicos in the Turks and Caicos Islands
