= Seal Cay =

- Location within Bahamas

Geography
- Location: Atlantic Ocean
- Coordinates: 27°15′39″N 78°21′16″W
- Archipelago: Lucayan Archipelago
- Length: 0.700 km (0.435 mi)
- Width: 0.085 km (0.0528 mi)
- Highest elevation: 3 m (10 ft)

Administration
- Bahamas

Seal Cay is a plain island within The Bahamas. Administratively, the area belongs to the Grand Cay. At 3 m (9.8 ft), it is the highest point in the Bahamas.

The island is located in the north of the archipelago Abaco for 3.3 km to the east of the island of Walker's Cay. There are extreme east to the highest (height 3 m) island group. It has elongated length 700 m, width 85 m.

== Tourism ==
As Walker's Cay is known for its shallow coastal waters, here dwells a lot of fish, especially sharks, which can be fed with it. In addition there developed diving. In 2002, the barrier reef to the surrounding waters north of the islands were declared a national park; Walker's Cay National Park.
