= Staniel Cay =

Island in the Bahamas

- Location within Bahamas

Geography
- Location: Atlantic Ocean
- Coordinates: 24°10′10″N 76°26′25″W
- Archipelago: Exuma
- Area: 1.388 km^{2} (0.536 sq mi)
- Length: 3 km (1.9 mi)
- Width: 1 km (0.6 mi)

Administration
- Bahamas
- Largest settlement: Nassau

Demographics
- Population: 118

Staniel Cay is an island located in The Exuma Cays, a district of The Bahamas.

Staniel Cay is located roughly 120 km (75 mi) south of Nassau and 400 km (250 mi) southeast of Florida. The island has a population of less than 118 full-time residents and has an area of less than 5 km^{2} (2 sq mi). Staniel Cay is inhabited by a small Bahamian village which lies on the western shore. The village is composed of residential housing, a few restaurants, a church, a police station, post office, a library, three small retail stores and marine supply shops. Staniel Cay is protected by the Bahamas National Trust, the organization in charge of the conservation and preservation of places of historic interest and natural beauty in The Bahamas.

== History ==
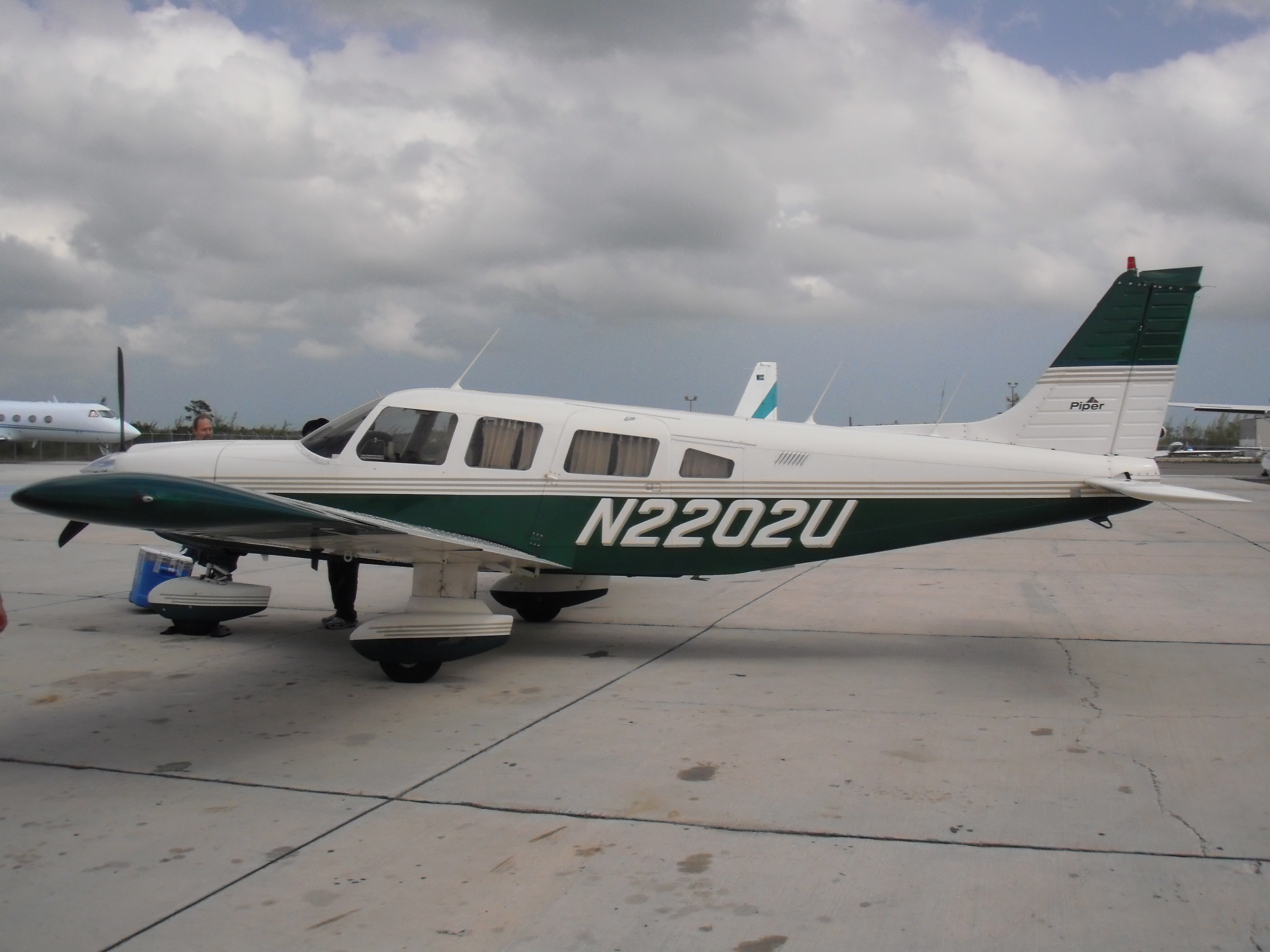
Private plane in Staniel Cay Airport

Staniel Cay was established in 1783 when the American loyalist settled the entire archipelago of Exuma. The island gained its popularity with the establishment of The Staniel Cay Yacht Club in 1956, founded by Bob Chamberlain and Joe Hocher. A variety of businesses operate on Staniel Cay to provide accommodation and organize activities. Thunderball Grotto, a limestone cave situated on the western coast of Staniel cay, was the setting of the 1965 James Bond film Thunderball. It was from this film the name Thunderball was given to the grotto. The island was also used as a filming location for a scene in the 1983 James Bond film Never Say Never Again. Staniel Cay has a small airport called Staniel Cay Airport, which makes the island reachable both by sea and air. The airport closed for seven months in 2015 for runway repairs and reopened to air traffic on 18 November 2015.

== Language ==
The official language of Staniel Cay is English, but dialects exist among the different islands and Cays. A blend of African, English, and island dialects makes up the Bahamian English language. The idiom on the island was influenced by the African slaves and other settlers.

== Physical geography ==
Staniel Cay is located near the center of Exuma Cays. The island, located between Big Major Cay and Bitter Guana Cay, is one of the larger islands within the Exuma Cays. The island is composed of beaches, salt water, and a variety of vegetation. An abundance of coral reef can be found along the shores of Staniel Cay. It is accessible through scheduled flights, charter airplanes, and private planes, using its 3000-foot airstrip. It is also possible to reach the island by boat providing anchorages for yachts.

== Flora and fauna ==
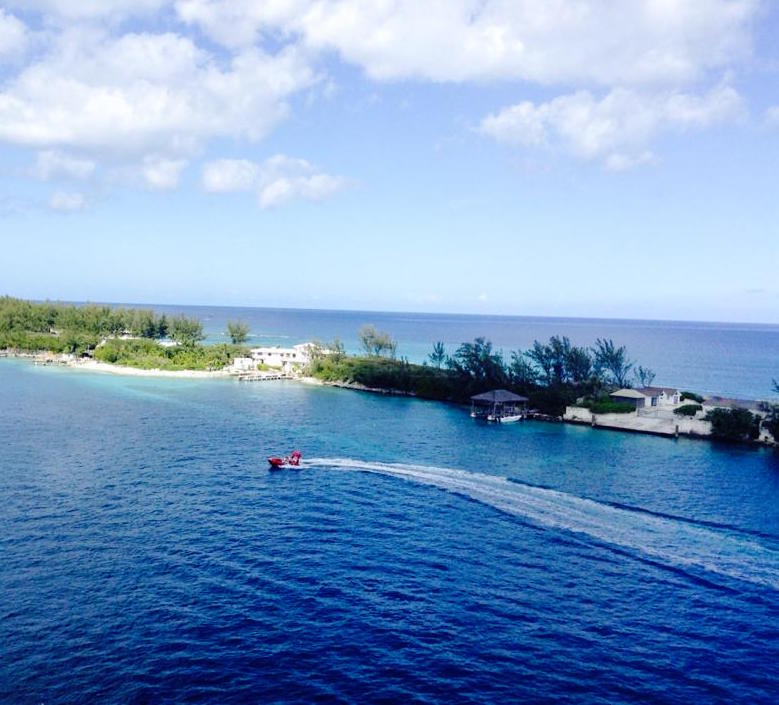
View of the Island in the Exuma Archipelago

Vegetation includes palm trees, bougainvilleas, hibiscus and seagrape. A diverse range of red, black and white mangrove can also be found on the island. Flora includes sugar cane and tamarind, which are typically served as local dishes. Fauna includes the typical Bahamian Pig and Anolis lizards. In 1977, small groups of brown anole were released in Staniel Cay, small brown and yellow lizards with black markings on their backs. These small reptiles are 17–20 cm long and usually live in forests. The reptiles feed on the insects around the island. The waters are populated with fish and vegetation of varying sizes including larger fish such as: sharks, groupers, barracuda, angelfish, and butterfly fish, miniature crabs, and daredevil shrimp.

== Climate ==
Staniel Cay has a tropical savannah climate. In the summer the average air temperature is approximately 30 °C (86 °F). In winter the average air temperature is in the mid 20s. Water temperatures are 20–25 °C (68–77 °F) degrees all year long. Moreover, cloudy days are often warm and the precipitations are concentrated in the warmest months, which are July, August and September.

== Economy ==
A large part of Staniel Cay's economic support is provided by the Staniel Cay Yacht Club and The Exuma Cays Land and Sea Park. Initially, Park laws allowed a daily fishery catch quota. In 1986, due to unverifiable pressure on fish, lobster, coral reefs and other marine life, the Trust declared the entire park a “fishery reserve”. Now such areas are promoted as one of the best ways to sustain fishery resources. Staniel Cay's economy is based on tourism. Tourism together with tourism-driven construction and manufacturing accounts for approximately 60% of GDP and directly or indirectly employs half of the archipelago's labor force. The Exuma Cays Land and Sea Park has become an important factor in the economy of the Exuma Cays through tourism, farming, coastal fishing and public education.

== Environmental protection ==
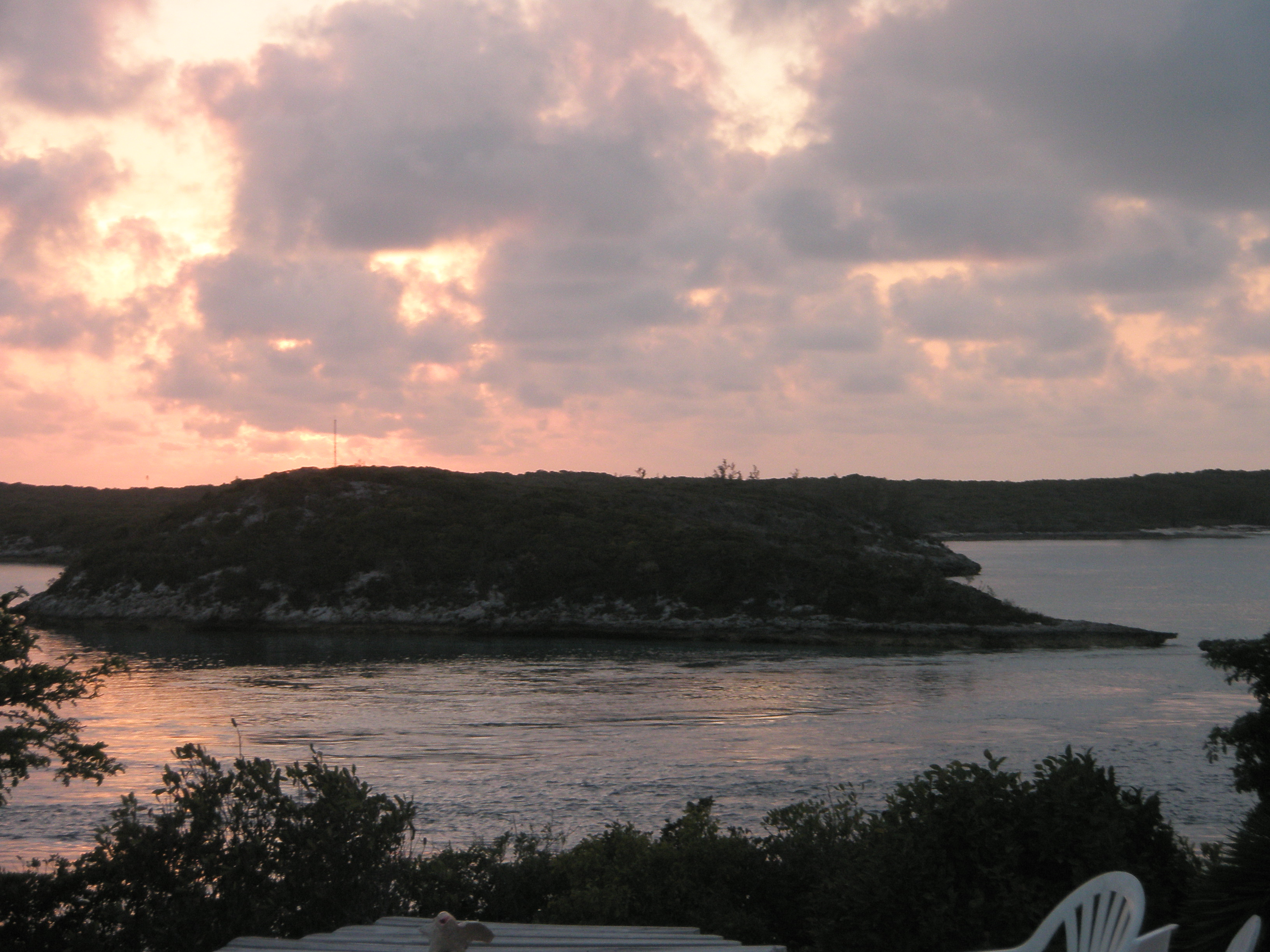
View of Thunderball grotto

Sustainable tourism has increased in reputation in recent years, particularly for destinations such as Staniel Cay. The island relies heavily on its natural attributes, making the most of its reputation as an untouched tropical island. According to the Bahamas National Trust (BNT), 80% of visitors to the Exuma Cays come to experience nature. According to the BNT, 16,665 people visited Thunderball Grotto between November 2012 and April 2013. The area around Staniel Cay is managed and protected by the BNT as it falls within the boundary of the Exuma Cays Land and Sea Park. This park was created in 1958 and stretches 455 km^{2} in size. The park protects the marine environment and establishes a no-take, marine reserve. In January 2013, the BNT published a report that reviewed current sustainable tourism models which lead to the adoption of the Tourism Optimization Management Model. The model focuses on the interactions tourist have with the environment and how they could be improved. The BNT established a Project Management Group consisting of local stakeholders as well as representatives from the Ministry of Tourism.

== Culture ==
Staniel Cay has a mixture of different cultural traditions with ancient customs. Due to the level of tourism many festivals are oriented towards entertaining visitors and travellers to the island. Bahamian music ranges in style and includes genres such as Caribbean Reggae and Rake-n-Scrape. Other traditional cultural activities include storytelling.

One cultural festival on the island is Junkanoo. It is a festival celebrated on Boxing Day, New Year's Day and other holidays. It is a festival of music, art and dance.

== Religion ==
The on Cay church with services held during the week and every Sunday is Mount Olivet Baptist Church. About 32% of the population of the Bahamas are Baptist. 20% belong to Anglican groups and about 24% are Protestants, such as the Methodists (6%), the Church of God (6%), Seventh-day Adventists, and members of the Salvation Army. Roman Catholics constitute 19% of the population. There are also groups of Jews, Baháʼís, Muslims, Hindus, and Rastafarians and a strong Greek Orthodox community. Traditional practices as Voodoo or Obeah are still practiced in some areas.

== Visitor activities ==
Staniel Cay has a variety of activities and events for tourists and residents to participate in on the island. These include beach activities, snorkeling, scuba diving, fishing, and kayaking. Staniel Cay has guided tours, activities, and the well-known swimming pigs.

=== Snorkeling ===
Marine life can be explored by participating in a variety of snorkeling activities. There are miles of coral reefs on Staniel Cay and neighbouring islands and Cays. The waters surrounding the islands are clear and shallow, making snorkeling easy for first-timers, but a variety of places exist for more experienced divers. Grottos can be found around the island, including Thunderball grotto which is a natural limestone cavern which can be entered underwater or at low tide. Light enters through a vaulted ceiling and a variety of sea-life swim in the water below, including the purple parrotfish, yellowtail snappers, Angelfish and Sergeant Majors. The island is surrounded by shallow reefs within a few feet of the surface. Farther out from the islands, the waters are cluttered with thousands of shallow water sites, coral heads, and reefs. Snorkeling does not require the specialized technique, training and gear which means it is available from many activity providers, including hotels, lodges and resorts on and around Staniel Cay. Alternatively, local snorkeling guides can provide the information for independent snorkeling adventures.

=== Scuba diving ===
Staniel Cay and the surrounding islands within Exuma contain a wide range of scuba diving attractions, such as steep reef walls, historic ship wrecks, coral reefs, and a diverse range of marine animals. Because of the clarity within the water, Staniel Cay and the surrounding islands offer good conditions for underwater photography and video. “Scuba Diving Top 100: Best Diving in the Caribbean & Atlantic” rated Bahamian Scuba Diving as the number one “best advanced diving locations of the world”. Furthermore, the Exuma Islands were ranked third for the “Best Underwater Photography”. Professional diving operations such as “Staniel Cay Adventures” offer personalized dive trips in the waters of the Exuma Cays custom dive boat. PADI professionals offer a variety of dive courses, ranging from the most basic beginner lessons to more advanced specialty courses. All training takes place in warm, clear water, and is sanctioned by top certifying agencies.

=== Sea kayaking ===
Another activity on the Staniel Cay is kayaking. Due to the weather conditions the possibility to reserve a kayak and discover the Exuma Cays by water is offered at any time of the year.

=== Sand beaches ===
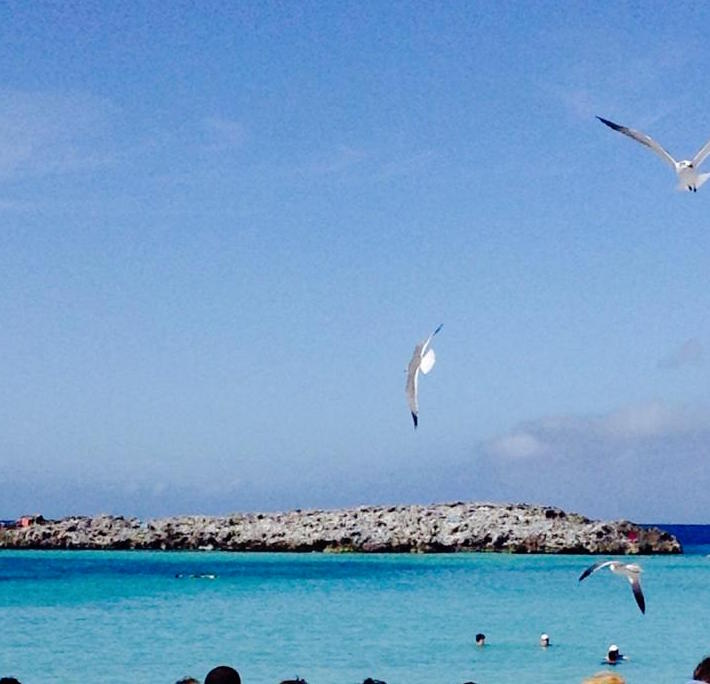
View of the Beach of the island

Staniel Cay and the Exuma Cays offer thousands of miles of white-sand beaches. The shallow waters provide a pristine setting for a selection of activities available throughout the islands. These beaches have translucent emerald-green water and an abundance of marine life. Bungalows and villas are tucked into the tropical landscape featuring branded 4-star boutique hotels. This embodies the idea of seclusion, where even the largest resorts have fewer than 200 rooms.

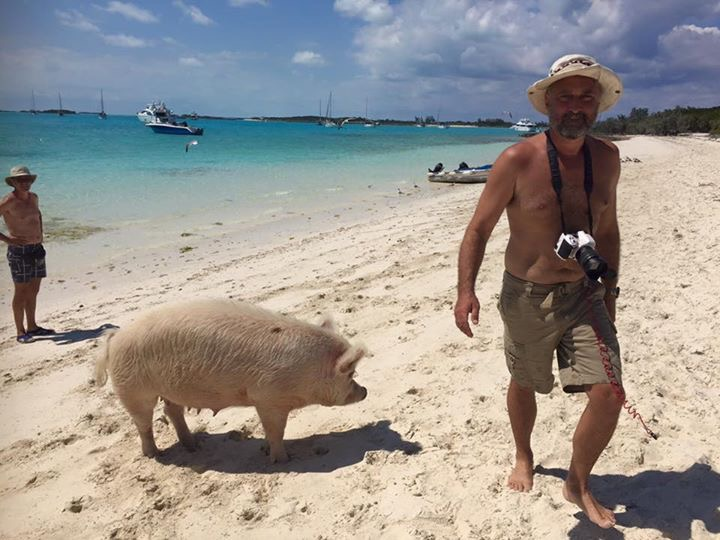
A tourist visits Pig Beach

=== Swimming with pigs ===
Staniel Cay is located in close proximity with another Exuma island called Pig Beach, officially known as Big Major Cay, which is an uninhabited island populated by swimming feral pigs. With a total of 365 islands, located south of Nassau and only 40 minutes from Florida, on the island of Big Mayor Cay, these pigs are found in abundance. Exuma's swimming Pigs draw thousands of tourists each year.

The swimming pigs are surrounded by a variety of local legends. Rumors suggests that the pigs were brought to the island by sailors who planned to eat them upon their return. The pigs were said to have subsisted on food waste abandoned by passing ships. According to locals, the truth behind the swimming pigs’ story can be traced back to the early 1990s. The pigs were said to have been raised on Staniel Cay before the locals decided to move the animals. The pigs were relocated to the uninhabited island, Big Major Cay, where the pigs were left to roam free. As time progressed, the population of the pigs gradually began to multiply. Periodically, inhabitants of Staniel Cay would head over to the island, pick the fattest pig, and share the meat to locals. As word began to spread of the island, tourism came with abundance. And with tourism, came nourishment for these animals.

The islands growing reputation inspired the award-winning short film When Pigs Swim, the first film dedicated to discovering the origin of the swimming pigs. Directed by Charles Allan Smith, the documentary was shown at five international film festivals.

=== Events ===
Every year The Staniel Cay Yacht Club and The Staniel Cay Sailing Club organizes the Regatta around New Year's Day. This event attracts visiting yachtsmen cruising The Exuma Cays to test the speed of their craft in a competition against traditional Bahamian sloops. In August, the Annual Staniel Cay Bonefish Tournament occurs, another important event which attracts foreigners and brings home the locals.

== See also ==
- List of islands of the Bahamas
- Staniel Cay Airport
- Pig Beach
- Exuma
