= Vehicle registration plates of the Bahamas =

Commonwealth of The Bahamas
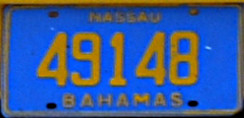
- Country: Bahamas
- Country code: BS

Current series
- Slogan: None
- Size: 152 mm × 300 mm 6.0 in × 11.8 in
- Introduced: 2016; 10 years ago

History
- First issued: 1977; 49 years ago

The Bahamas requires its residents to register their motor vehicles and display a vehicle registration plate. Current plates are North American standard 6 in × 12 in (152 mm × 300 mm). The configuration of the plates is two letters followed by four numbers. At the bottom of the plate is the flag of the Bahamas.

The text of the plates varies by island, with each island or group issuing their own plates.

Image	First issued	Design	Slogan	Serial format	Serials issued	Notes
	1977	Black on cyan	IT'S BETTER IN THE BAHAMAS	T 123		Truck
	1987-1989	Black on yellow	None	12345		
	1990-1991	White on green	None	1234		
	1992-1996	Blue on yellow	1492 FIRST LANDFALL 1992	T1234		Anniversary of Christopher Columbus's arrival in the Americas on October 12, 1492 (truck plate)
	1997-2015	Gold on blue	None	12345		
