= August Cay =

Island in the Bahamas

- Location within Bahamas

Geography
- Location: Atlantic Ocean
- Coordinates: 26.670183°N 77.915389°W
- Type: Cay
- Archipelago: Bahamas

Administration
- Bahamas

August Cay is an island in the Bahamas. It is located in the East Grand Bahama District, in the northern part of the country, 190 km north of Nassau, the capital. It covers an area of 6.8 square kilometers.

The terrain of August Cay is largely flat. The highest point on the island is 8 meters above sea level. It extends 2.8 km from north to south and 4.9 km from east to west.

There are about 38 people per square kilometer around August Cay, a relatively sparsely populated area. The climate is savanna. The average temperature is 24 °C . The warmest month is August, at 27 °C, and the coldest is February, at 18 °C . The average rainfall is 1,466 millimeters per year. The wettest month is July, at 242 millimeters of rain, and the driest is January, at 15 millimeters.

== See also ==
- List of islands of the Bahamas
