= Cay Sal =

Cay Sal Cayo de Sal
- island Cay Sal (Bahamas)

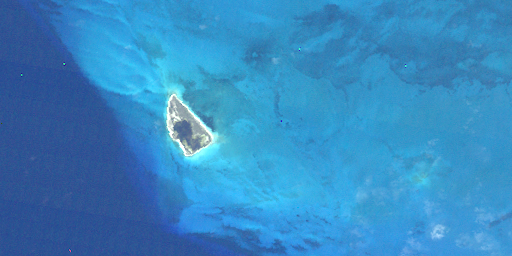
- View of the island from above
- Interactive map of Cay Sal
- Country: The Bahamas
- Region: Bahama Banks
- District: Bimini

Area
  - Total: 1.22 km^{2} (0.47 sq mi)

Population
  - Total: 0
  - Density: 0.0/km^{2} (0.0/sq mi)

Languages
  - Official: English
- Time zone: UTC−5 (EST)

Cay Sal (Spanish: Cayo de Sal) is a small island in the Cay Sal Bank between Florida, Cuba, and the Bahamas. It is no longer inhabited.

The Bahamas have an agreement with the U.S. Coast Guard to regularly fly over Cay Sal and other islands in the bank to look for people potentially stranded there.

== Geography ==
Cay Sal is the main island in the southwestern zone of the Cay Sal Bank. It is 1.6 km (1.0 mi) in length and 1.22 km^{2} (0.47 sq mi) in area. Cay Sal is located approximately 30-32 miles (50-54 kilometers) north of the island nation of Cuba. Cay Sal is also located about 55 miles (88 kilometers) south of Florida.

The island is covered with stunted palm trees and marked by several dilapidated buildings standing on its western side. In its interior there is a large salt pond commonly replenished by heavy wind-driven seas that broach the islet along its southwest side.

== History ==
According to Spanish navigators the island had a few natural salt pans producing good, clean salt, and its leeward side provided an excellent anchorage as well.

From the 1960s to late 1970s the Royal Bahamas Defence Force kept a small outpost on Cay Sal island, which also had an airstrip. Another island in the banks, Elbow Cays, has a lighthouse built in 1839 by the British.

The United States Coast Guard constantly monitors Cay Sal and nearby islands for refugees from Cuba. Cay Sal is about thirty miles away from Cuba. Refugees rescued on the island have included pregnant women and children. Refugees are reported to have employed a variety of craft including small, ill-equipped boats, in spite of the possibility of pursuit by the Cuban military.

In 2023, the Coast Guard rescued a man who had been stranded on the island for three days.

== See also ==
- Cay Sal Airport
