= Walker's Cay Airport =

- IATA: WKR; ICAO: MYAW

Summary
- Airport type: Public
- Serves: Walker's Cay
- Location: Bahamas
- Elevation AMSL: 9 ft / 3 m
- Coordinates: 27°15′37.5″N 78°24′8.0″W

Map
- Location of Walker's Cay Airport in the Bahamas

Runways
Direction	Length		Surface
Direction	m	ft	Surface
09/27	762	2,500	Gravel
- Source: Landings.com

Walker's Cay Airport (IATA: WKR, ICAO: MYAW) is a public use airport located near Walker's Cay, the Bahamas.

== Airlines and destinations ==
Airlines	Destinations
Flamingo Air	Freeport

== See also ==
- List of airports in the Bahamas
