= Cay Sal Airport =

- IATA: none; ICAO: MYCS

Summary
- Airport type: Private
- Serves: Cay Sal
- Location: Cay Sal Bank, Bahamas
- Elevation AMSL: 5 ft / 2 m
- Coordinates: 23°42′42″N 80°24′48″W

Map
- Location of Cay Sal Airport in the Bahamas

Runways
Direction	Length		Surface
Direction	m	ft	Surface
11/29	732	2,401	Asphalt
- Source: Landings.com

Cay Sal Airport (ICAO: MYCS) was an airport located on Cay Sal, the Bahamas. The airstrip which was built there during WWII is now abandoned according to aerial imagery.

== See also ==
- List of airports in the Bahamas
