= Little Inagua =

Uninhabited island in The Bahamas

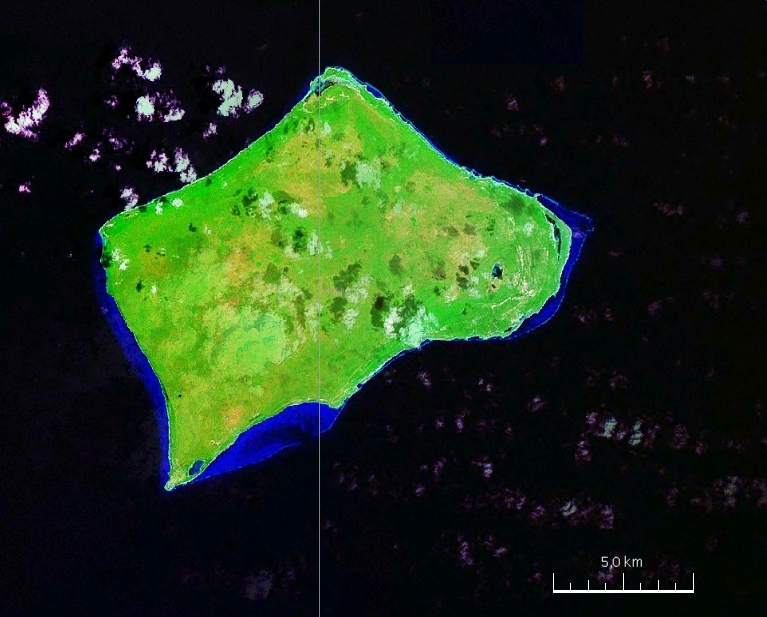
- Satellite image of Little Inagua, Bahamas

- Location within Bahamas

Geography
- Location: Atlantic Ocean
- Coordinates: 21°30′N 73°00′W
- Archipelago: Lucayan Archipelago
- Area: 50 sq mi (130 km^{2})

Administration
- Bahamas

Demographics
- Population: 0

Additional information
- Time zone: EST (UTC-5)
  - Summer (DST): EDT (UTC-4)
- ISO code: BS-IN

Little Inagua is a small remote island in the Bahamas. It is the largest uninhabited island in the Caribbean and has no fresh water. The island remains in an undisturbed and natural state.

In 2002, the Bahamas Government designated it as Little Inagua National Park. The park is approximately 31,600 acres and its designation extends into the marine area to 100 fathoms. The park holds a wide variety of reptiles, birds, wild goats, and donkeys. Additionally, the island is a nesting location for a critically endangered sea turtle species.

On July 27, 2017, the U.S. Coast Guard and the Royal Bahamas Defence Force rescued six Haitian migrants from the island.

== See also ==
- Inagua
- List of islands of The Bahamas
