= Nicholas Channel =

Strait between Cuba and the Bahamas

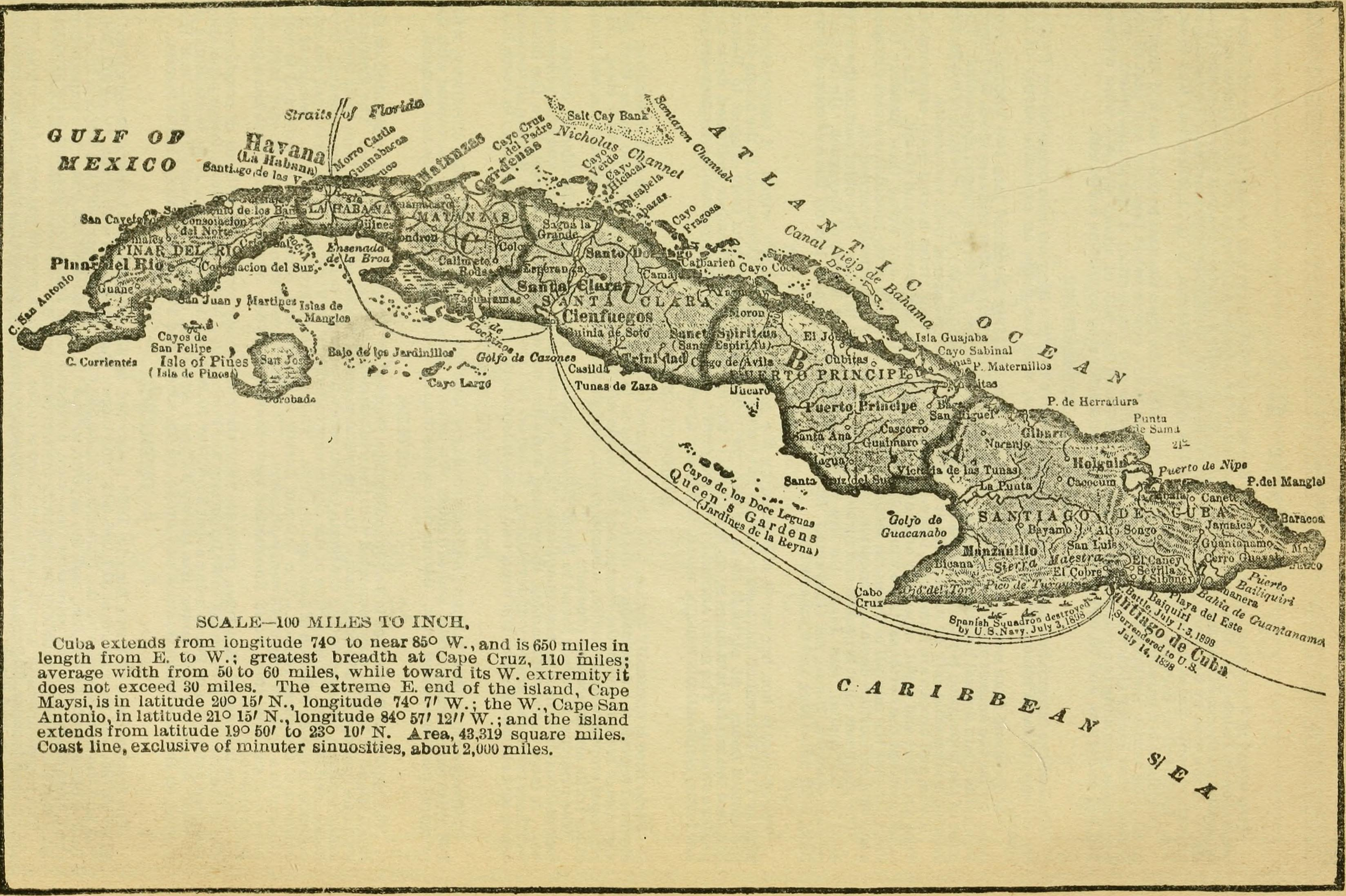
- 1899 map of Cuba with the Nicholas Channel in the north, between Cay Sal Bank and Cuba's northern coastal islands.

- Location within Bahamas Location within Cuba Location within the Caribbean
- Coordinates: 23°25′N 80°05′W
- Basin countries: Cuba; United States; Bahamas

Nicholas Channel (also Saint Nicholas Channel; Spanish: Canal de Nicolás or Canal de San Nicolás) is a strait off the northeastern coast of Cuba. It lies 90 miles (145 km) east of Havana. It separates Cuba from the most southwestern of the islands of the Bahamas.

== Geography ==
Part of the Atlantic Ocean, it is bordered to the west by the Straits of Florida, to the north by the Cay Sal Bank and to the south by the Sabana-Camaguey Archipelago off Cuba's north shore and to the east by the Old Bahama Channel.

Geography of this location can be described as follows:

Both the Little and the Great Bahama Banks have their edges towards the Atlantic. These gulfs and channels are full of islands and rocks which with some others farther south are comprehended under the general name of the Bahama Islands. The Key Sal Bank which turns the gulf stream to the north and sends it to the Straits of Florida lies between the Great Bahama Bank and Cuba between 23 and 24 N lat and is divided from the former by the Santarem Channel and from the latter by Nicholas Channel which unite farther to the south east and take the name of Old Bahama Channel. Key Sal Bank is of no great extent and contains few rocks and islets.
