= Old Bahama Channel =

Strait between Cuba and the Bahamas

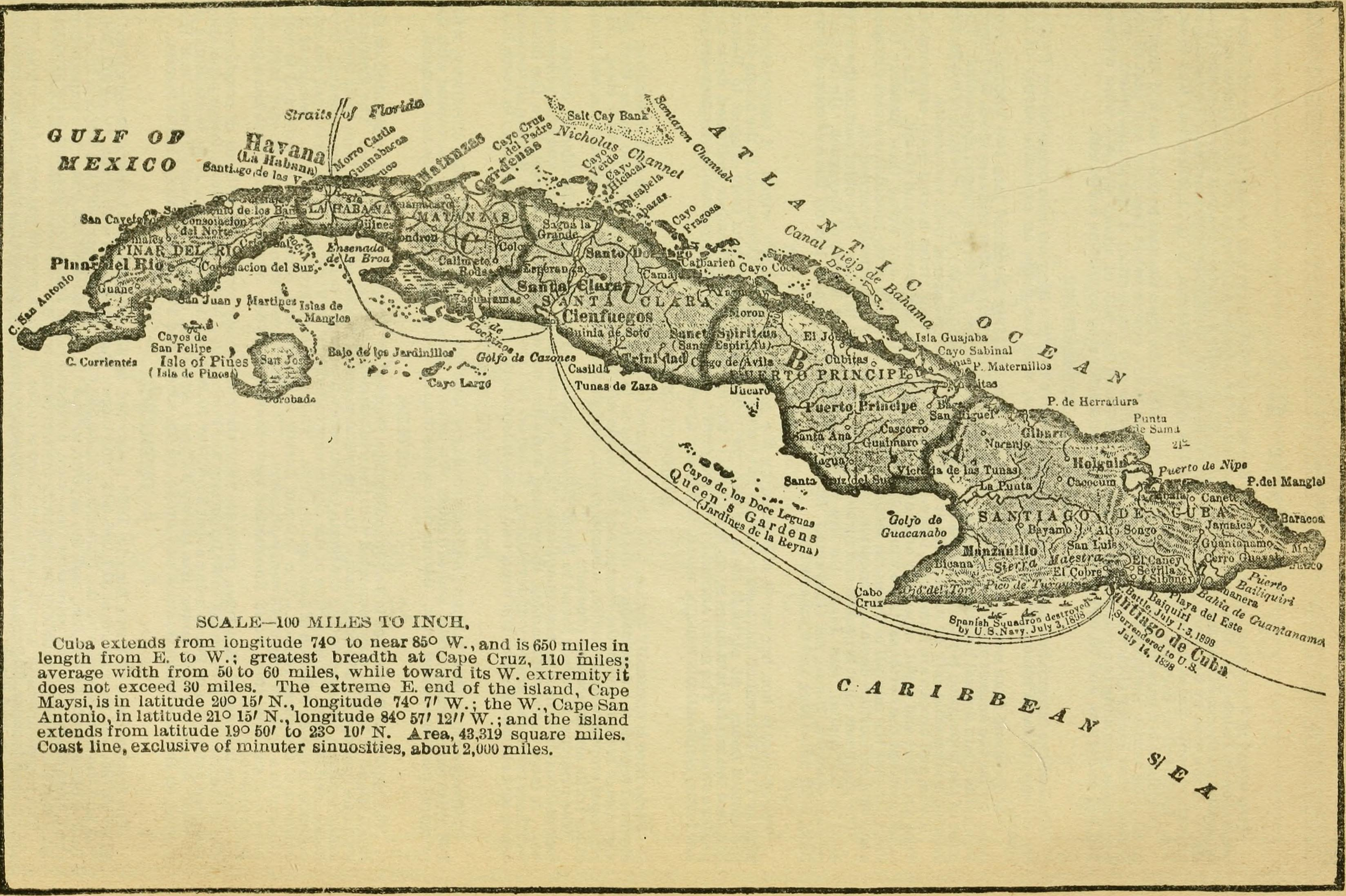
- 1899 map with Old Bahama Channel−Canal Viejo de Bahama.

- Location within Bahamas Location within Cuba Location within the Caribbean

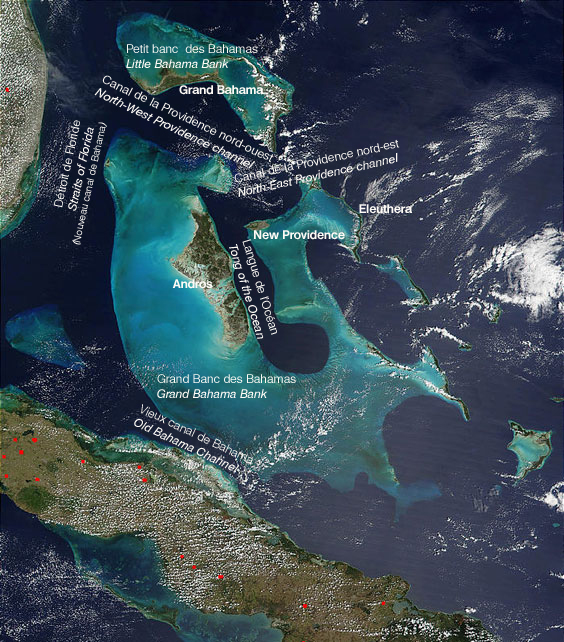
- Straits and canals around the Bahamas Islands.
- Coordinates: 22°46′02″N 78°24′01″W
- Basin countries: Cuba; Bahamas

The Old Bahama Channel (Spanish: Canal Viejo de Bahamas) is a strait of the Caribbean region, between Cuba and the Bahamas.

== Geography ==
The strait/channel is located off the Atlantic coast of north-central and northeastern mainland and the Sabana-Camagüey Archipelago of Cuba, and south of the Great Bahama Bank of the Bahamas. It is approximately 100 miles (161 km) long and 14 miles (22.5 km) wide at its narrowest place. It divides the northernmost bank of the Caribbean islands into two nearly equal parts. To the north and northeast is the Great Bahama Bank and the Bahama Islands; and to the south the bank on which the island of Cuba rests.

The Old Bahama Channel is connected at its north-western extremity end to the Florida Straits by two arms, enclosing Cay Sal Bank, of which the northern is called Santaren Channel and the southern Nicholas Channel. It is considered as terminating on the east between Cape Maysi in Cuba, and Inagua island in the Bahamas. However, it can also be considered to include the deep sea which separates the minor banks north of Haiti from this island, so that it extends to the Mona Passage, or the strait between the islands of Hispaniola and Puerto Rico.

The narrowest portion of the Old Bahama Channel is between 22° and 23° North latitude, where its width rarely exceeds 12 miles (19 km).

== History ==
In the 1500s, Alonso Valiente was one of the discoverers of the Old Bahama Channel.

The Spanish colonial trade routes in the Spanish West Indies originally favored the Old Bahama Channel, then shifted to the Straits of Florida—New Bahama Channel, as it was a safer alternative.

In the Old Bahama Channel, ship captains had to pick their way through the low-lying cays and shoals of the southern Bahama Banks. A Royal Navy vessel, the 44-gun HMS Chesterfield, was wrecked in the Channel in 1762.
