= Tourism in the Bahamas =

The Bahamas is an island country in the West Atlantic Ocean consisting of 700 coral islands, of which 30 are inhabited. The tourism industry is a significant sector of the Bahamian economy. In 2021, it was estimated that tourism accounted for 45% of the Bahamas's national gross domestic product. In 2024, the Bahamas received over 11.22 million tourists, of which 1.7 million were foreign air arrivals. Tourists from the United States make up approximately 85% of all international visitors to the Bahamas.

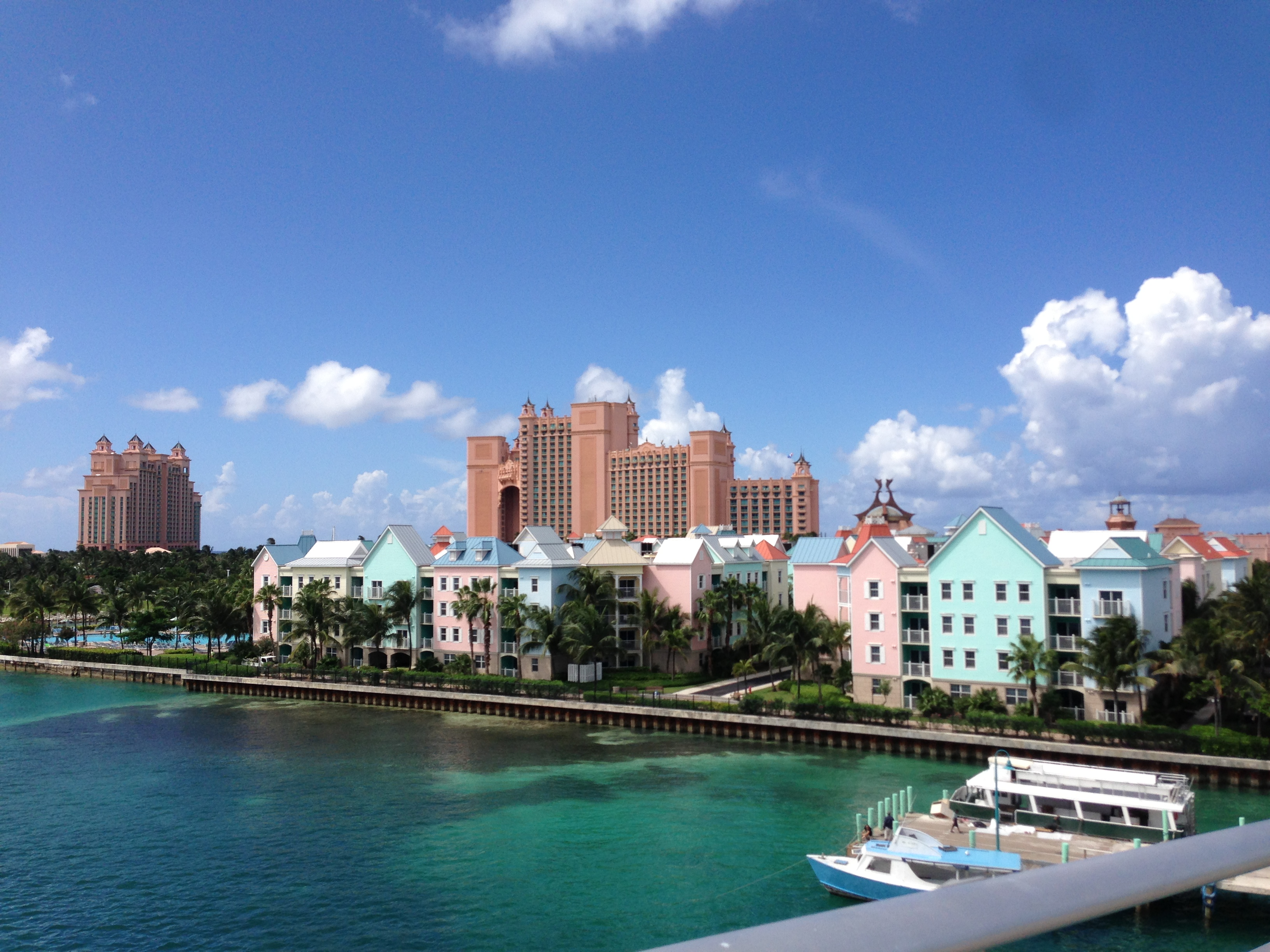
Nassau, Bahamas with Atlantis Paradise Island

== Destinations ==
Due to its archipelagic nature, the Bahamas has a decent selection of destinations for tourists. Some of the most popular tourist destinations in the Bahamas are Nassau, Grand Bahama, Exuma, and Bimini.

Nassau is the capital of the country and is located on New Providence. With a population of approximately 305,000, Nassau is the largest city in the Bahamas. By air, Nassau is served by Lynden Pindling International Airport. Nassau also serves as a port for cruises and receives approximately 3.7 million cruise passengers annually. The following is a list of attractions in Nassau:

- Queen's Staircase: A historical landmark featuring 66 steps that were carved by hand between 1793 and 1794 by enslaved people. The landmark serves as a reminder of the suffering endured by those who carved it.
- Fort Fincastle: A historical fortress that is located at the top of Bennet's Hill that had also previously served as a lighthouse.
- Arawak Cay: An artificial island that is notable for its fish fry restaurants and was previously home to a street circuit.
- Baha Bay: A water park that features more than 30 attractions including a lazy river, two water coasters, and 24 water slides.
- Atlantis Paradise Island: A large resort that features five hotels, lagoons, waterfalls, golf course, casino, and the largest water park in the Caribbean region.

Nassau also hosts a number of beaches, such as Cable Beach and Junkanoo Beach.

Pig Beach, located in Exuma, also serves as a major tourist destination in the Bahamas. The pigs are feral domesticated pigs and their origin on the island is currently unknown.

Andros is home to the Andros Barrier Reef, which is over 124 miles long and is the world's third largest barrier reef. It is accessible by boat only, though snorkeling and diving are popular activities in the reef. Animals present in the reef include stingrays, sea turtles, dolphins, sharks, sponges, lobsters, tuna, and marlins. It is the only locale with more than one Nassau grouper congregation.

Grand Bahama Island is also a popular tourist destination. It is served by Grand Bahama International Airport. Lucayan National Park is located on the island and possesses one of the world's longest charted underwater cave systems. Freeport is the second largest city in the country and has been referred to as its "industrial capital". One of its attractions is Coral Vita, the world's first commercial coral farm that is located on land.

== Visa policy ==
Visa policy of the Bahamas The Bahamas Visa not required (8 months) Visa not required (3 months) Visa not required (90 days) if holding a valid Canadian, Schengen, UK or US visa, or a permanent residence permit issued by any Schengen Area member state or the UK; otherwise, eVisa eVisa Visa required

The Bahamas requires an electronic visa from countries and territories, except those that have been granted visa free access. Foreign visitors from a visa-required country or territory travelling by cruise ships are not exempt from this visa requirement. All persons entering the Bahamas are required to be in possession of a passport. Those who normally require a visa are exempted if they either possess a Canadian Immigration Record Form 1000 or a United States green card.

== Cruises ==
Cruises are the greatest contributor to the Bahamas's tourism sector. In 2023, the Bahamas welcomed 7.8 million cruise passengers. A number of cruise lines operate cruises to the Bahamas, including Royal Caribbean International, Virgin Voyages, Oceania Cruises, Princess Cruises, Carnival Cruise Line, Norwegian Cruise Line, Disney Cruise Line, and Celebrity Cruises. The Bahamas has approximately 10 ports spread across different islands.

== Visitor statistics ==
Yearly tourist arrivals in thousands

Most stopover visitors, those staying for 24 hours or more, arriving to the Bahamas were from the following countries of nationality:

Country	2021	2020	2019	2018	2017	2016	2015	2014	2013
United States	835,925	354,555	1,473,543	1,304,551	1,145,072	1,182,518	1,169,250	1,129,454	1,086,719
Canada	11,744	42,945	134,501	126,444	111,039	124,922	148,522	142,002	121,983
United Kingdom	6,244	8,019	36,766	36,240	33,540	34,824	31,694	27,538	26,741
Mexico	3,709	1,494	5,755	5,547	5,827	7,669	5,915	5,662	5,293
Brazil	3,466	1,912	10,644	8,261	8,718	7,672	9,303	10,306	9,896
Jamaica	3,007	1,382	6,496	6,883	6,980	6,980	7,004	7,136	7,925
Colombia	1,807	717	2,631	2,536	2,234	3,613	3,145	3,348	4,364
South Africa	1,746	943	2,307	2,046	1,813	1,816	2,028	1,772	1,550
Germany	1,680	2,541	11,592	12,982	13,119	11,274	11,522	11,418	10,538
France	1,673	4,106	18,923	17,550	16,748	15,173	15,017	16,550	15,699
Switzerland	1,062	997	5,832	6,099	6,251	6,581	6,520	6,187	5,743
Italy	1,055	2,000	13,730	13,579	13,403	12,699	10,913	11,275	10,528
Argentina	902	991	5,046	6,602	7,398	7,474	5,611	5,519	5,830
Total	886,381	428,962	1,806,223	1,633,445	1,439,102	1,481,832	1,483,748	1,421,860	1,363,487
