= Pig Beach =

Uninhabited island in Exuma, the Bahamas

Coordinates: 24°11′01″N 76°27′23″W

Big Major Cay
Nickname: Pig Beach
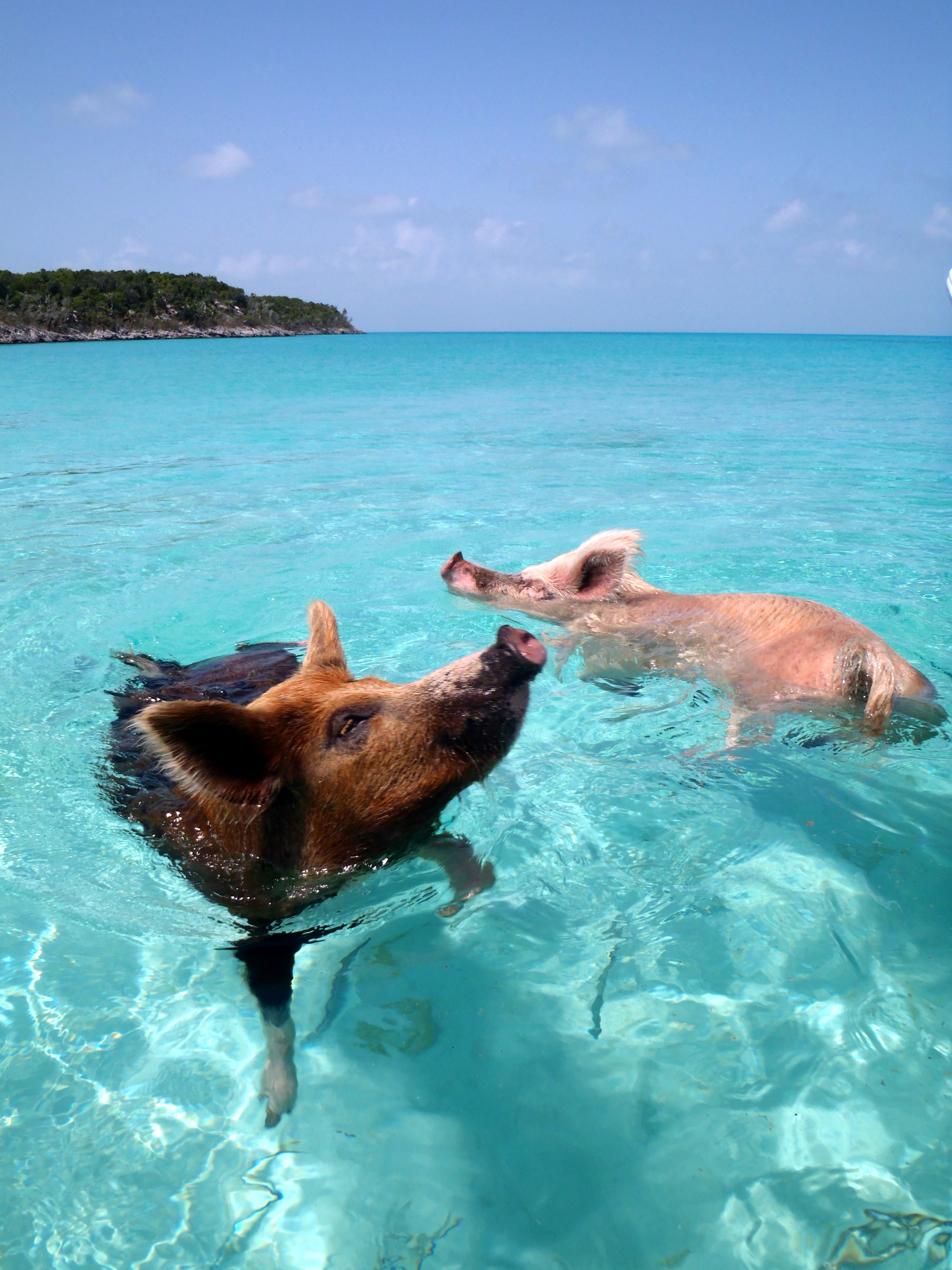
- Pigs swimming in the Bahamas

- Location within Bahamas

Geography
- Location: the Americas
- Archipelago: Exuma Cays
- Total islands: 1
- Major islands: 1

Administration
- The Commonwealth of the Bahamas
- Capital city: Nassau
- Largest settlement: Nassau (pop. 248,948; as of 2010)
- Prime Minister: Philip Davis

Pig Beach located on Big Major Cay (also known as Major Cay) is a beach on an uninhabited island (or cay) located in Exuma, the Bahamas. The island takes its unofficial name from the fact that it is populated by a colony of wild boars who live on the island. It has become a tourist attraction in modern times.

The pigs are known in popular culture as "the Bahamas' swimming pigs" although other islands with swimming pigs exist in the Bahamas.

== Geography and features ==
Exuma is a district of the Bahamas, and consists of over 365 islands and cays. Near Big Major Cay is Staniel Cay. There are three freshwater springs on the island.

== History ==
=== Anecdotal history ===
A single, factual account of how the pigs ended up on the cay does not appear to exist. Folklore and various theories claim a number of different scenarios including pirates.

Some say the pigs are said to have been dropped off on Big Major Cay by a group of sailors who wanted to come back and cook them. The sailors, though, never returned; the pigs survived on excess food dumped from passing ships.

Another legend has it that the pigs were survivors of a shipwreck and managed to swim to shore, while other accounts claim that the pigs had escaped from a nearby islet. Yet others suggest that the pigs were part of a business scheme to attract tourists to the Bahamas while another claims the pigs were stocked on the island in the 1990s by residents of nearby Staniel Cay to raise for food.

=== Modern day ===
The pigs are now fed by residents from neighboring islands and tourists and the island is unofficially known as Pig Beach by both locals and tourists.

In 2017, a number of the resident pigs were found dead, which caused speculation regarding the cause of death including claims of tourists feeding pigs alcohol or the pigs ingesting sand.

== Demographics and fauna ==
Big Major Cay is an island uninhabited by humans. The pig population was estimated between fifty and sixty pigs as of 2019. A few stray cats and goats can be found on the island as well.

== Travel and tourism ==
From Nassau to Pig Beach is 89 miles (143 km) and takes 2 hours by speed boat. A number of tour operators offer both private and group trips from Great Exuma, Staniel Cay, and other nearby cays.

== In popular culture ==
Pig beach has become a popular topic on social media sites like Instagram and featured in the television series, The Bachelor. Some people claim to have been bitten by a pig while visiting. They have been written about in a book and claim to be featured in a documentary.

== See also ==
- List of islands of the Bahamas
