= Cay Lobos =

Island in the Bahamas

Coordinates: 22°22′48″N 77°35′12″W

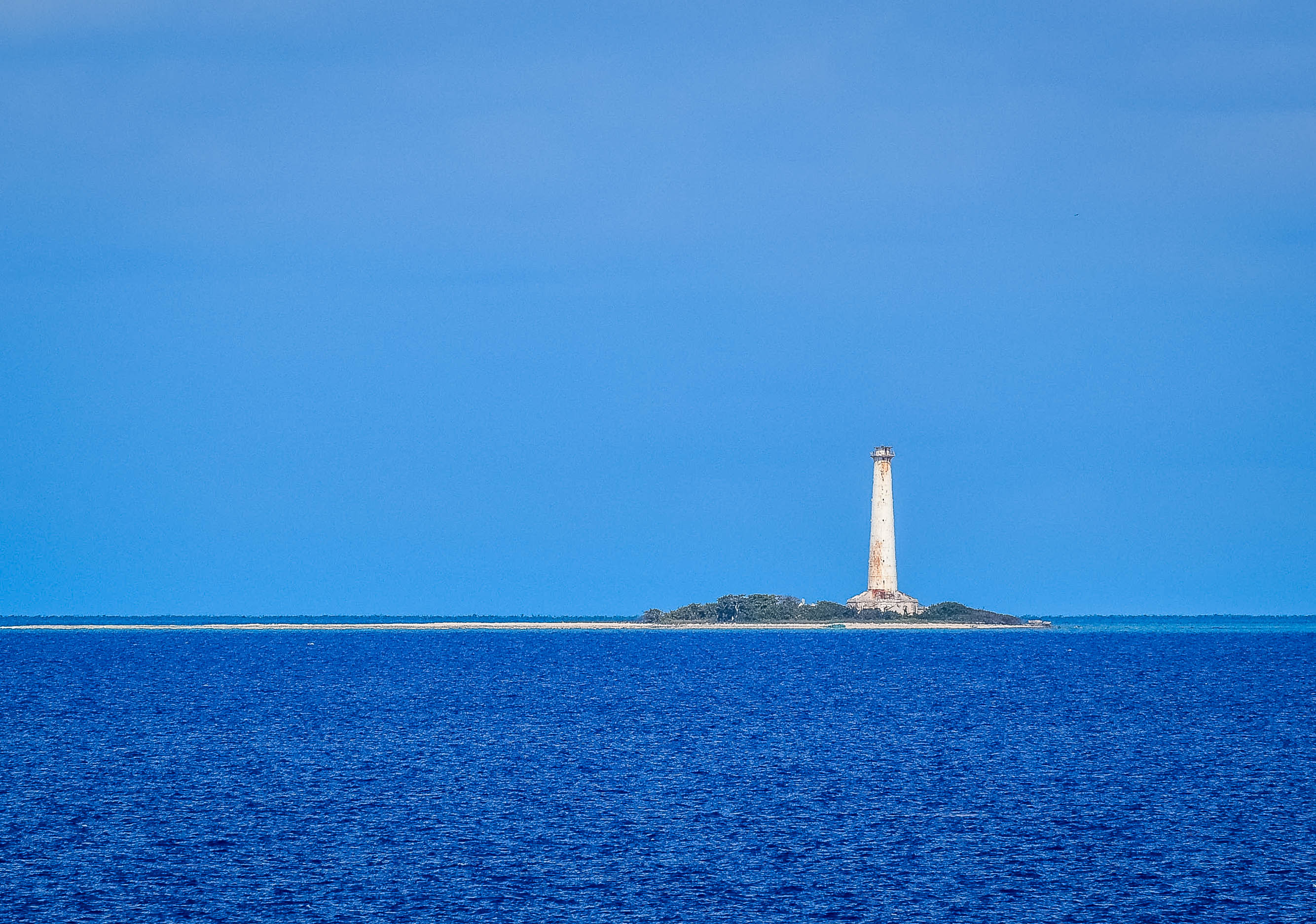
The island of Cay Lobos

Cay Lobos is an island in the Bahamas. It is located in the South Andros district, in the southern part of the country, 300 kilometres (190 mi) south of Nassau, the capital city.

The terrain of Cay Lobos is varied. The highest point on the island is 4 meters above sea level.

In 1935, Franklin D. Roosevelt went on a fishing trip on the island. During World War II, the island was visited by USS Welles. After the Cuban Missile Crisis, the island was used to transport Cuban refugees to Key West via USCGC Androscoggin.

The main landmark on the island is Cay Lobos Lighthouse.

== See also ==
- List of islands of the Bahamas
