= Little Inagua National Park =

National park in the Bahamas

- Location within Bahamas
- Location: Little Inagua, the Bahamas
- Coordinates: 21.5000°N 73.0000°W
- Area: 62,800 acres (254 km^{2})
- Established: 2002
- Governing body: Bahamas National Trust
- Website: bnt.bs/little-inagua-national-park/

Little Inagua National Park is a national park on and around Little Inagua, The Bahamas. The national park was established in 2002 and has an area of 62,800 acres (254 km^{2}), including the island and its surrounding waters.

== Flora and fauna ==
The park is a nesting site for sea turtles, and the surrounding waters are important queen conch (Aliger gigas) larval habitat.
