= Big Cross Cay =

Island in the Bahamas

- Location within Bahamas

Geography
- Location: Caribbean Sea
- Coordinates: 26.8225°N 77.9367°W
- Area: 2.663 km^{2} (1.028 sq mi)
- Coastline: 7.548 km (4.6901 mi)

Demographics
- Population: 83 (2020)
- Pop. density: 31/km^{2} (80/sq mi)

Big Cross Cay is an island located in North Abaco, Bahamas.

== Climate ==
The climate zone of Big Cross Cay is tropical.

== Topography ==
The island's mean elevation is five meters below the sea level.

== Nature ==
=== Dominating Vegetation ===
57 percent of the island is covered in shrubland. The soil in these places are not fertile.

=== Vegetation Zones ===
There are dense forests, open meadows, wetlands, coastal zones and others.

== Infrastructure ==
=== Airspace Availability ===
There are no functioning airports on Big Cross Cay, making it only accessible by a boat ride from Treasure Cay.
