= Cay Sal Bank =

Cay Sal Bank Placer de los Roques
- Carbonate platform
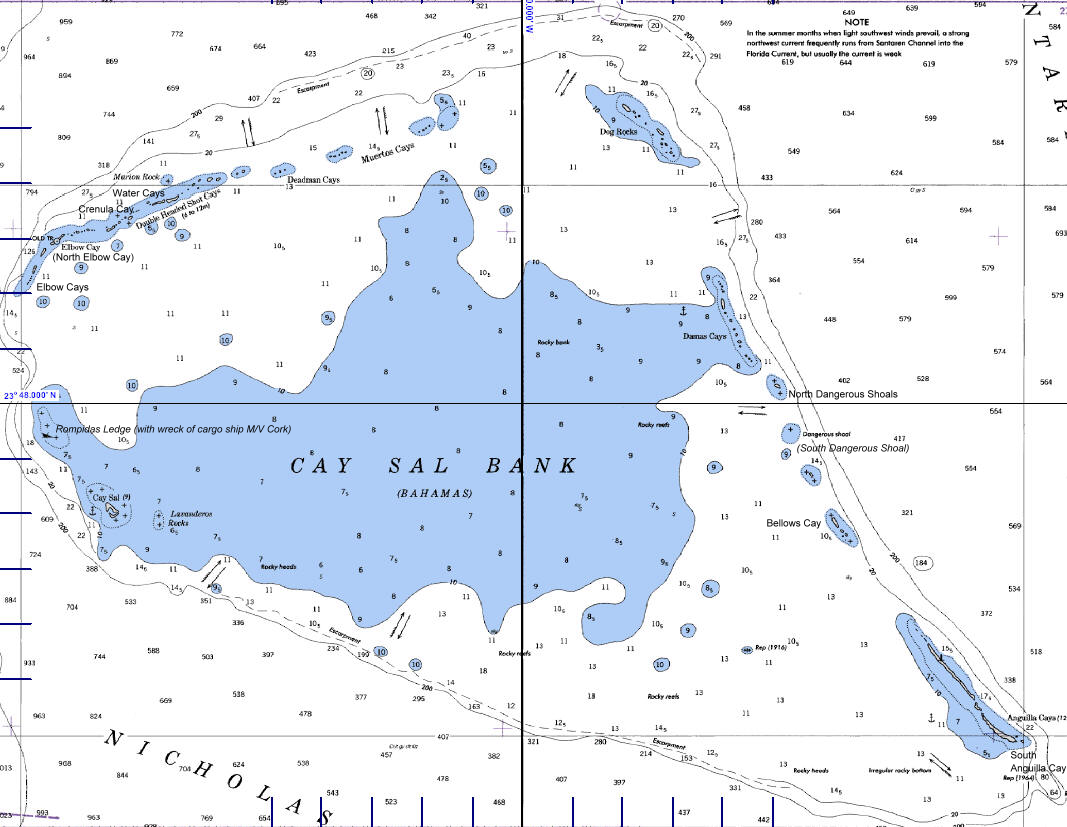
- Cay Sal Bank overview map

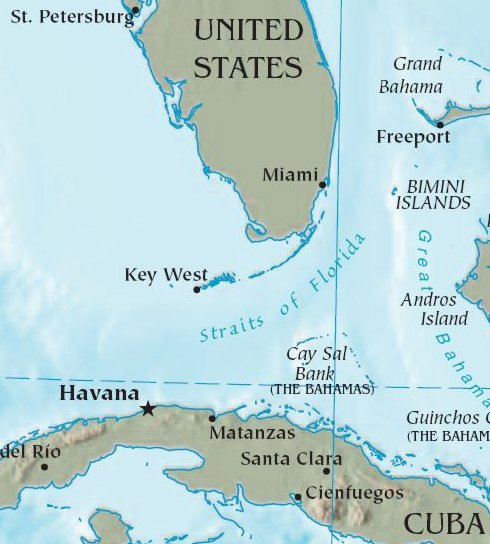
- Cay Sal Bank south of Florida and north of Cuba
- Country: The Bahamas
- Region: Bahama Banks
- District: Bimini
- Number of islands: 96
- Total land area: 14.87 km^{2}

Area
  - Total: 5,226.73 km^{2} (2,018.05 sq mi)

Languages
  - Official: English
- Time zone: UTC−5 (EST)

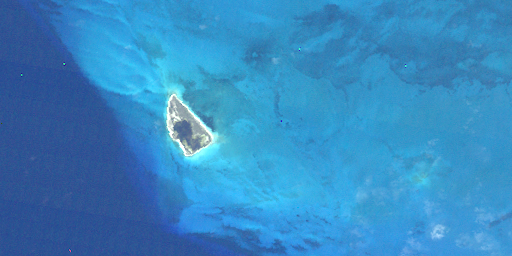
Cay Sal Island with Lavanderas Rocks below right center

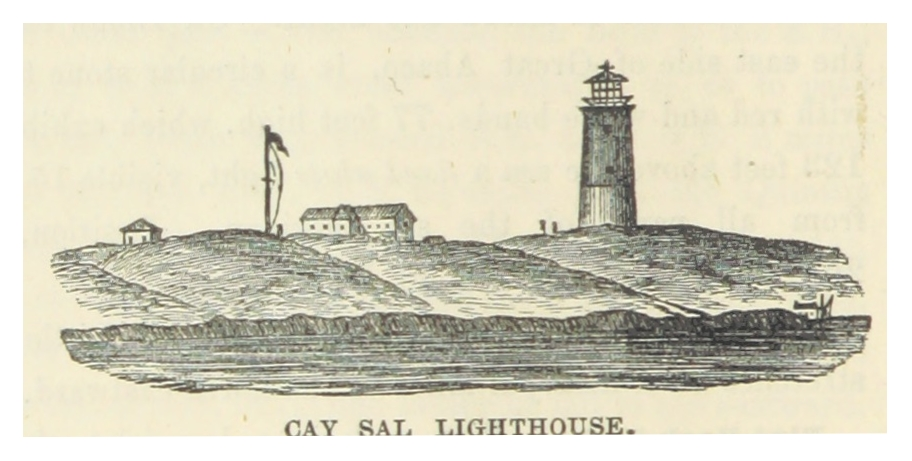
Old drawing of the British-built lighthouse. Although known as 'Cay Sal Lighthouse', it was located on Elbow Cay and not Cay Sal Island.

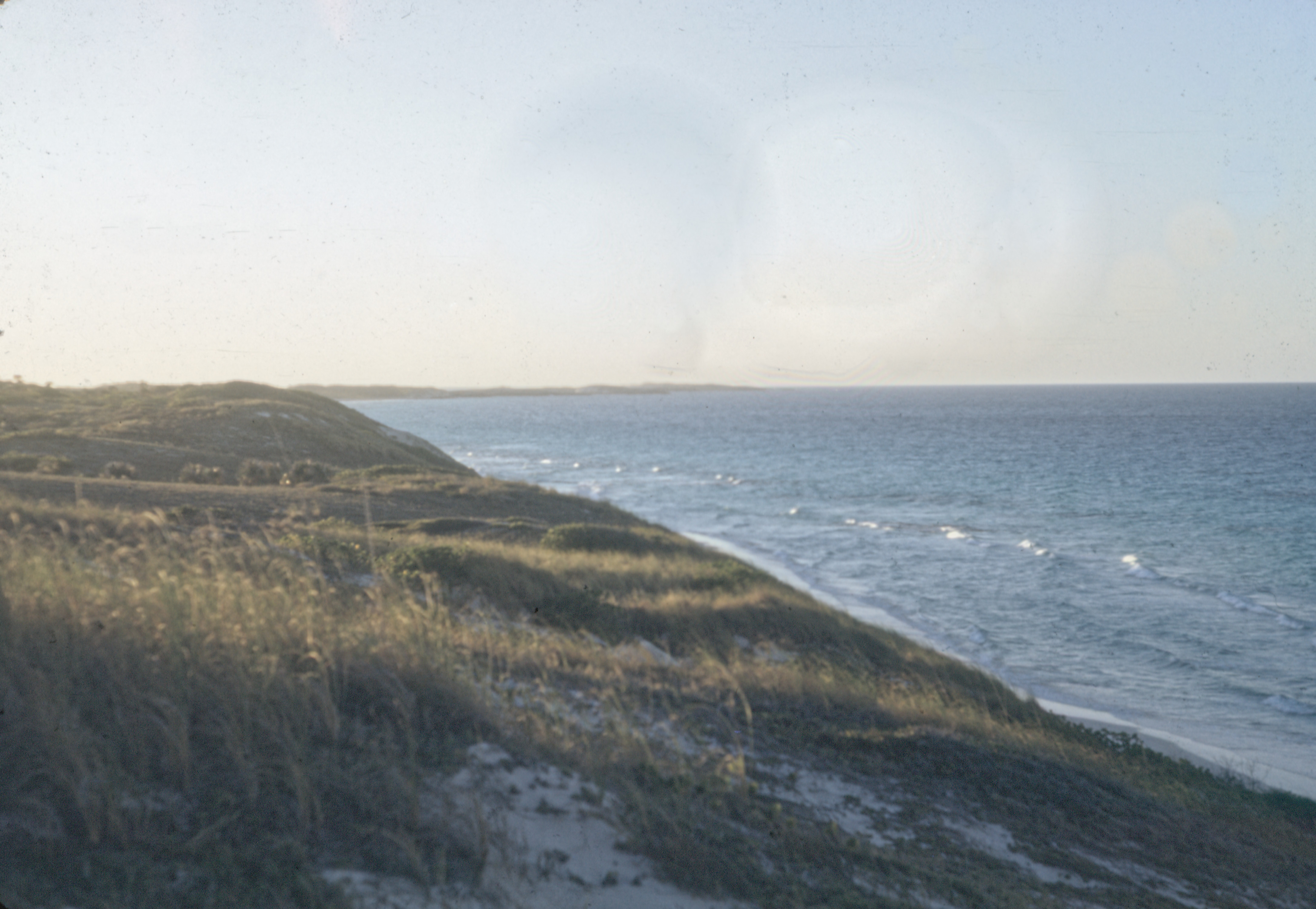
North end, Anguilla Cay, Cay Sal Bank, 1949

Cay Sal Bank (Spanish: Placer de los Roques) is the third largest (after Great Bahama Bank and Little Bahama Bank) and the westernmost of the Bahama Banks. It is located between 23º27'N - 24º10'N and 079º25'W – 080º35'W, and is found between Cuba, the Great Bahama Bank, and the Florida Keys. In a geographical sense, it lies closer to Cuba than to The Bahamas proper, lying 50 km (31 mi) away from Cuba across the Nicholas Channel. It is separated by the Santaren Channel from the Great Bahama Bank, the western rim of which is 50 km (31 mi) to the east, and is separated from the Florida Keys by the Straits of Florida, lying 100 km (62 mi) to the south of Key Largo.

Administratively, the bank and its islands are part of Bimini district of The Bahamas, the main islands of which are 150 km (93 mi) to the north. The closest point of any other named Bahamian land to the bank is Orange Cay (24°56′24″N 79°08′45″W), the southernmost island of the Bimini Chain. The distance between Orange Cay and the nearest dry land of Cay Sal Bank, the Dog Rocks, is 120 km (75 mi). The westernmost tip of Andros is the second closest point of land, approximately 145 km (90 mi) east of Cay Sal Bank.

== Geography ==
Cay Sal Bank is an atoll of roughly triangular shape, with a base along the south rim of 105 km (65 mi), and a width of 66 km (41 mi) north-south. With a surface of 5,226.73 square kilometres (2,018.05 sq mi) it is one of the largest atolls of the world. Among the atolls with some land area (i.e. disregarding totally submerged atoll structures), Cay Sal Bank is second only to Great Chagos Bank. The lagoonal surface has a depth of 9 to 16 metres (30 to 52 ft). The individual islands (i.e. islets or cays) are 96 in number.

Cay Sal Bank has numerous islets along its rim, except along the south side facing Nicholas Channel, where it has only rocky coral heads. It has a total of 96 islands, islets and rocks awash, with a total land area of 14.87 km^{2} (5.74 sq mi).

=== Features ===
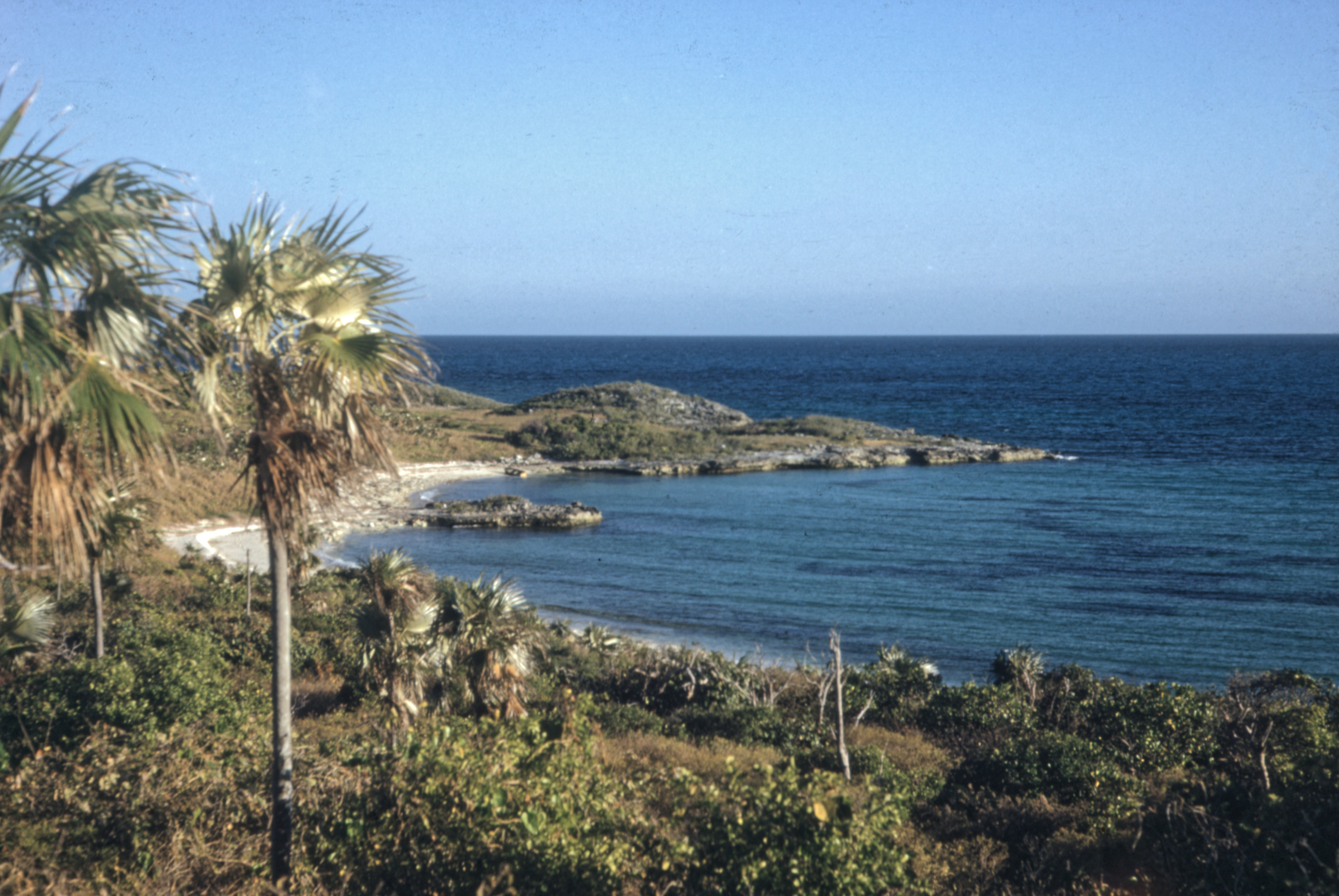
Anguilla Cay landing, 1949

The islands, rocks and reefs along the rim of the atoll are listed clockwise from southwest to southeast. There are also a number of smaller, unnamed cays or rocks. Some of the historical Spanish language names of the features of the bank were replaced by English names when the Bahamas became a British Crown colony in the 18th century.

1. Lavenderas Rocks (Spanish: Lavanderas), 23°40′38″N 80°20′57″W. It is a submerged reef to the ESE of Cay Sal Island.
2. Cay Sal (Spanish: Cayo de Sal), 23°41′20″N 80°23′26″W. Cay Sal, the main island in the southwest, is 1.6 km (1.0 mi), 1.22 km^{2} (0.47 sq mi) in area, and is no longer inhabited. In its interior is a large salt pond commonly replenished by heavy wind-driven seas that broach the islet along its southwest side. It is covered with stunted palm trees and marked by several dilapidated buildings standing on its west side. This cay gives the name to the whole bank in the English language.
3. Rompidas Ledge, 23°46′N 80°27′W (submerged). Rompidas Ledge is a submerged coral head 3 km (2 mi) northwest of Cay Sal, about 1 square kilometre (0.4 sq mi) in extension and only 6 metres (20 ft) deep. The cargo ship M/V Cork ran aground there in 1983, and position is marked by its wreck.
4. The compact group formed by Elbow Cays, Crenula Cay, Double Headed Shot Cays, Water Cays and Marion Rock is known in Spanish as Los Roques. These northwestern cays gave their name to the whole bank in the Spanish language.
  1. Elbow Cays, 23°57′04″N 80°27′27″W are the westernmost group, running southwest to northeast along the Straits of Florida. The southernmost cays of the group consist of unnamed islets and rocks. Northeast of these are South Elbow Cay (the westernmost named cay of Cay Sal Bank) and North Elbow Cay, sometimes known just as Elbow Cay (Spanish: Cayo Codo). North Elbow Cay, which is the largest and highest of the cays, is marked by a disused conical stone lighthouse, which is 17.7 metres (58 ft) high.
  2. Crenula Cay 23°58′40″N 80°21′52″W
  3. Double Headed Shot Cays, 23°59′50″N 80°19′15″W. The Double Headed Shot Cays are a group of elongated cays that extend northeastward from the Elbow Cays, incorporating the Water Cays and all islets and reefs up to the Deadman Cays. They are in a position on the northwest side of Cay Sal Bank where the Florida Current, in its course east and north through the Straits of Florida, usually sets close offshore at full strength.
  4. Water Cays (Spanish: Cayo del Agua) (West Water Cay and East Water Cay), 23°59′26″N 80°20′26″W. These cays were mentioned by Alexander Von Humboldt.
  5. Marion Rock, 24°01′30″N 80°20′30″W (submerged). Located of the northern coast of the 'Los Roques' reef.
5. Deadman Cays, 24°00′45″N 80°15′14″W
6. Muertos Cays (Spanish: Cayo de Muertos), 24°02′07″N 80°08′34″W, located between the 'Los Roques' and the Dog Rocks.
7. Dog Rocks, (Spanish: Cayo de Perros), 24°03′27″N 79°52′14″W the northeasternmost island/reef group.
8. Damas Cays (Spanish: Cayo de Damas), 23°52′22″N 79°46′24″W Located on the approximate centre of the eastern side of the bank.
9. Dangerous Shoals or 'Dangerous Rocks' (Spanish: Cayo de Piedras)
  1. North Dangerous Shoals, 23°48′53″N 79°44′22″W
  2. South Dangerous Shoal, 23°44′13″N 79°41′49″W
10. Bellows Cay, 23°41′15″N 79°40′15″W
11. Anguilla Cays, 23°30′01″N 79°32′30″W. Anguilla Cays, near the southeast extremity of Cay Sal Bank, consist of several elongated, scrub-covered, sandy islands which are swampy near their southern end, and are marked here and there by stunted palm trees. The northern end of Anguilla Cays is marked by a beacon, 5 m high. Anguilla Cay is the name of the northern and second largest of the Anguilla Cays. Cotton Cay (sometimes just South Anguilla Cay) is the largest and southernmost of the Anguilla Cays. Between the two is the much smaller Middle Cay. In early 2021 three Cubans were stranded on one of the Anguilla Cays for 33 days after their boat was capsized by a storm. The three survived on coconuts, conches and rats for more than a month until their rescue by the US Coast Guard on February 9, after being spotted waving a makeshift flag by a routine patrol flight the day before.

== History ==
Spanish navigators visited the area plotting it for the first time on a map in 1511 as Los Roques and it was mapped by subsequent cartographers often with its adjacent Placer. The atoll was subsequently claimed for the Spanish crown by Juan Ponce de León. The bank was under the Spanish rule for about two centuries until 1718 when the Bahamas became a Crown colony of the British Empire. In 1825 Alexander Von Humboldt highlighted that the 'Salt Cays' were a danger for navigation, but that the waters had been previously well charted by Francisco de Seixas in 1692:

But such precise coordinates, so important for ships wishing to avoid Florida's sand bars in leaving the Channel and the Placer de los Roques (Salt Keys), can already be found in Captain Francisco de Seixas y Lobera's old unpublished maps from 1692.

Cay Sal Lighthouse, a tall stone lighthouse was built by the British on the island of North Elbow Cay in 1839 along with some small buildings. It marked the southern entrance to the Florida Straits from the Gulf of Mexico and was active until the 1940s. The abandoned lighthouse was briefly reactivated during the 1970s, when the Royal Bahamas Defence Force set up a post on nearby Cay Sal Island to watch for drug smugglers. The small outpost on Cay Sal island included the only airstrip on Cay Sal Bank and was kept from the 1960s to late 1970s.

Currently Cay Sal Bank is known for its many scuba diving spots, but good weather is needed in order to approach the reefs without danger.

=== Cartography ===
Ancient maps and nautical charts show Los Roques or Elbow Cays with or without the Placer or Pracel to the east. In the older maps the size of the cays and their adjacent bank was often exaggerated and merged with the Great Bahama Bank.

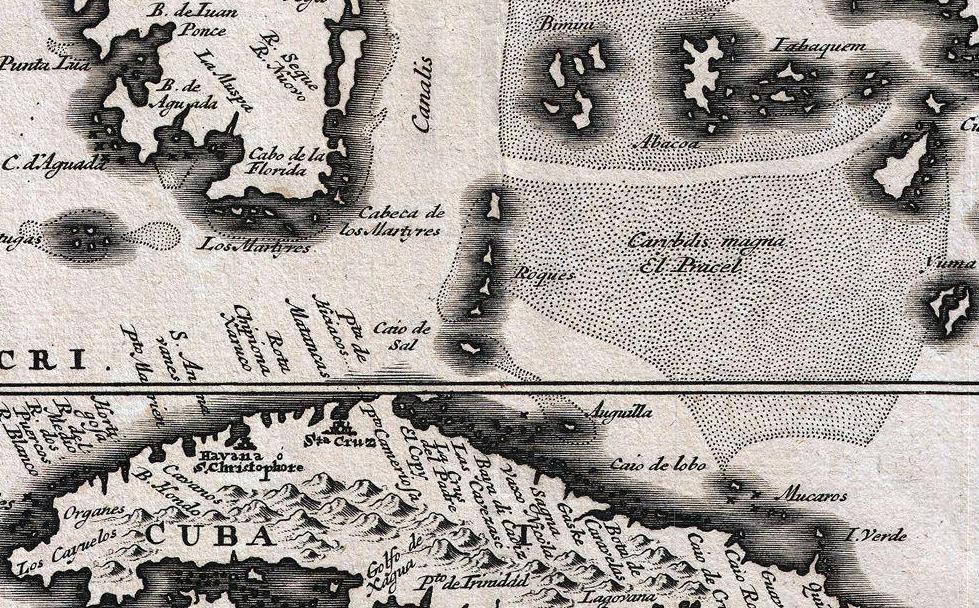
Los Roques with the Placer in a 1696 Danckerts map.

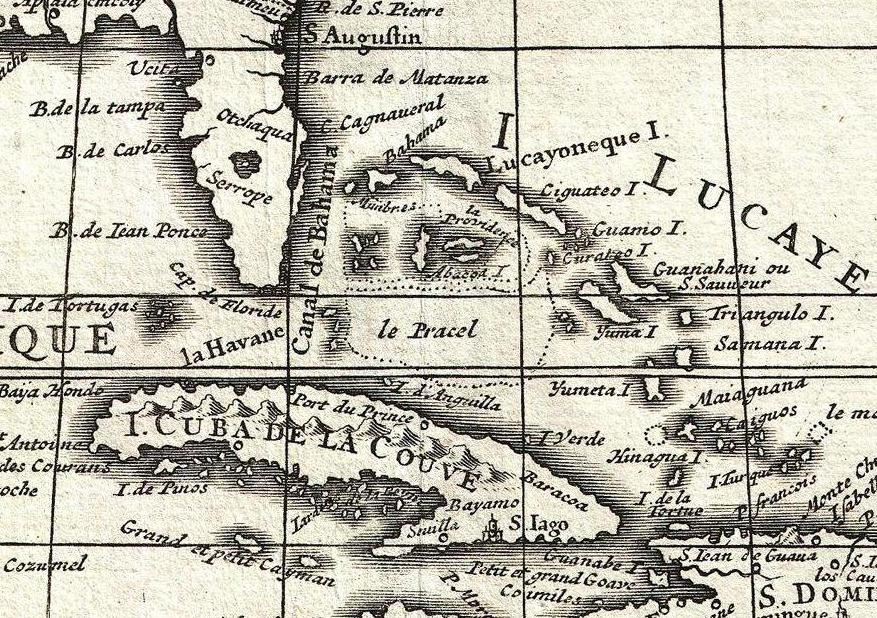
"Le Pracel" in a 1708 De L'Isle map.

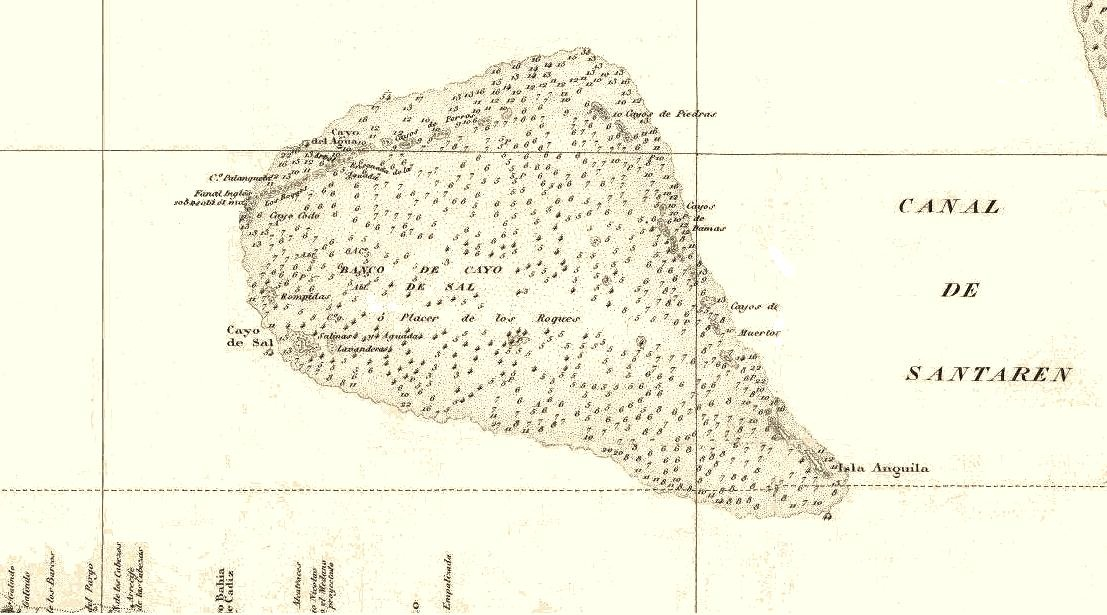
1854 Spanish map of the Placer de los Roques (Banco de Cayo Sal).

== See also ==
- Cay Sal Airport
- Operation 40
- Placer (geography)
