= Sugar Loaf Cay =

Island in the Bahamas

- Location within Bahamas Location within the Caribbean

Geography
- Location: Atlantic Ocean
- Coordinates: 26.5502°N 77.0218°W
- Archipelago: Lucayan Archipelago

Administration
- Bahamas

Demographics
- Population: 0 (2010)

Additional information
- Time zone: EST (UTC-5)
  - Summer (DST): EDT (UTC-4)
- ISO code: BS-CO

Sugar Loaf Cay is an island in the Bahamas, located in the district of Central Abaco. At the 2010 census, the island was depopulated.

The island provides habitat for the Bahama Nighthawk (Chordeiles virginianus vicinus).
