= Elbow Cays =

Elbow Cays Los Roques
- Cays
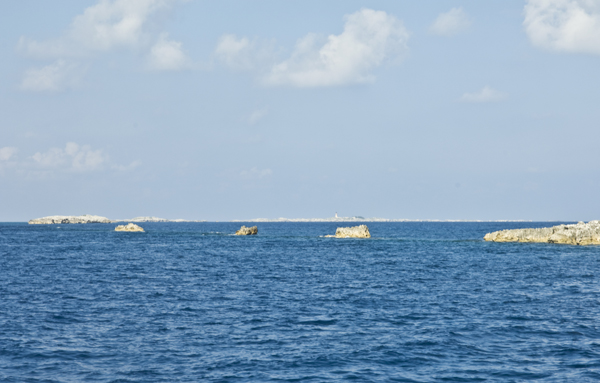
- View of the Elbow Cays. The semi-ruined lighthouse of North Elbow Cay can be seen in the background.

- Location within Bahamas
- Coordinates: 23°57′N 80°27′W
- Country: The Bahamas
- Region: Cay Sal Bank, Bahama Banks
- District: Bimini

Population
  - Total: 0

Languages
  - Official: English
- Time zone: UTC−5 (EST)
- Cay Sal Lighthouse
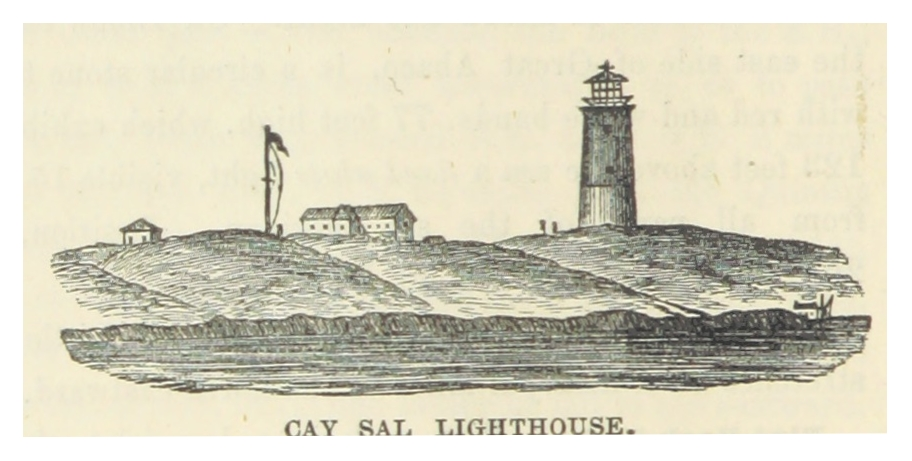
- Old drawing of the lighthouse. Although known as 'Cay Sal Lighthouse', it was not located on Cay Sal Island
- Coordinates: 23°57′12.6″N 80°26′42.0″W
- Constructed: 1839
- Construction: stone tower
- Height: 18 metres (59 ft)
- Shape: cylindrical tower with balcony and lantern
- Markings: unpainted and ruined tower
- Deactivated: 1940s

The Elbow Cays (Spanish: Los Roques) are uninhabited cays in the Cay Sal Bank, Bahamas. It is the most Western point in the Bahamas. They are part of a reef shelf located at the northwestern end of the bank about 80 km (50 mi) off the Cuban coast and 130 km (80 mi) southeast of Key West, Florida. These cays are an excellent scuba diving spot.

The Elbow Cays are the westernmost group on the reef, running southwest to northeast along the Straits of Florida. The southernmost cays of this group consist of unnamed islets and rocks. Northeast of these are South Elbow Cay (the westernmost named cay of Cay Sal Bank) and North Elbow Cay, the latter sometimes known just as Elbow Cay (Spanish: Cayo Codo).

North Elbow Cay, which is the largest and highest of the cays, is marked by a disused conical stone lighthouse, which is 17.7 metres (58 ft) high. The site is open for visitors, but the ruined tower is accessible only by boat and reaching it is extremely hazardous.

== Geography ==
The compact cluster of islets, rocks and reefs formed by Elbow Cays, Crenula Cay, Double Headed Shot Cays, Water Cays and Marion Rock, among other unnamed features, was named by the Spanish as Los Roques. These northwestern cays gave their name to the whole bank, which is known as Placer de los Roques, in the Spanish language.

=== Adjacent islands and rocks ===
- Crenula Cay 23°58′40″N 80°21′52″W
- Double Headed Shot Cays, 23°59′50″N 80°19′15″W, a group of elongated cays that extend northeastward from the Elbow Cays, incorporating the Water Cays and all islets and reefs up to the Deadman Cays in the east. They are in a position on the northwest side of Cay Sal Bank where the Florida Current, in its course east and north through the Straits of Florida, usually sets close offshore at full strength.
- Water Cays (Spanish: Cayo del Agua) (West Water Cay and East Water Cay), 23°59′26″N 80°20′26″W. Located towards the northeastern end these cays were mentioned by Alexander Von Humboldt:

Cayos del Agua (lat. 23° 58', long. 82° 56'), in the Placer de los Roques or the Cayo de Sal. I place the Cayo del Agua a little more to the west than Captain Steetz did on the interesting maps that accompany his Instruction nautique sur les Passages à l'île de Cuba, 1825, p. 55.

- Marion Rock, 24°01′30″N 80°20′30″W, a submerged rock Located off the northern coast of the 'Los Roques' reef.

== History ==
Spanish navigators visited the island, plotting it for the first time on a map in 1511 as Los Roques. The island and its atoll were subsequently claimed for the Spanish crown by Juan Ponce de León. The island was under the Spanish rule for about two centuries until 1718 when the Bahamas became a Crown colony of the British Empire.

A tall stone lighthouse was built by the British on the island of North Elbow Cay in 1839 along with some small buildings. It marked the southern entrance to the Florida Straits from the Gulf of Mexico and was active until the 1940s. The abandoned lighthouse was briefly reactivated during the 1970s, when Bahamas police set up a post on nearby Cay Sal Island to watch for drug smugglers.

=== Cartography ===
In ancient maps and nautical charts the size of these cays was often exaggerated.

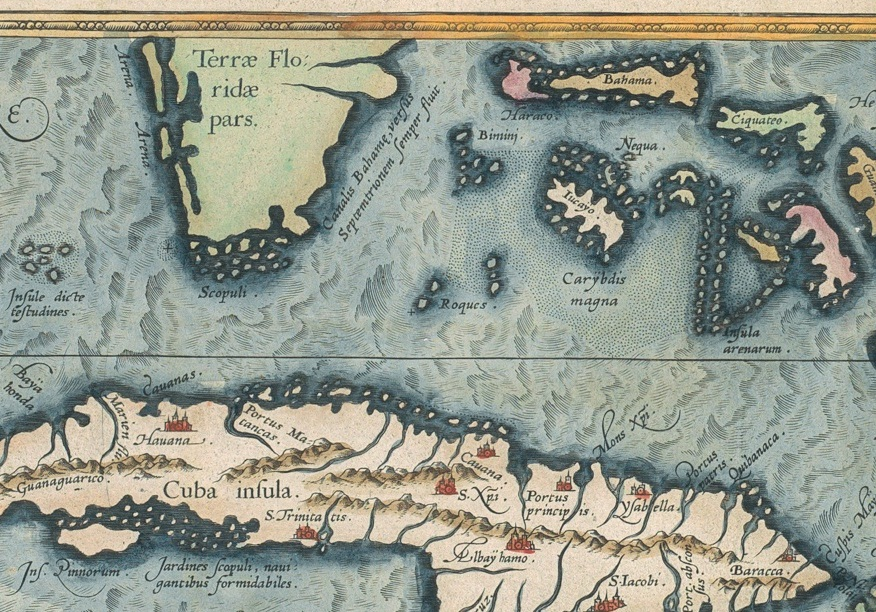
Los Roques in Atlas Ortelius ca 1580

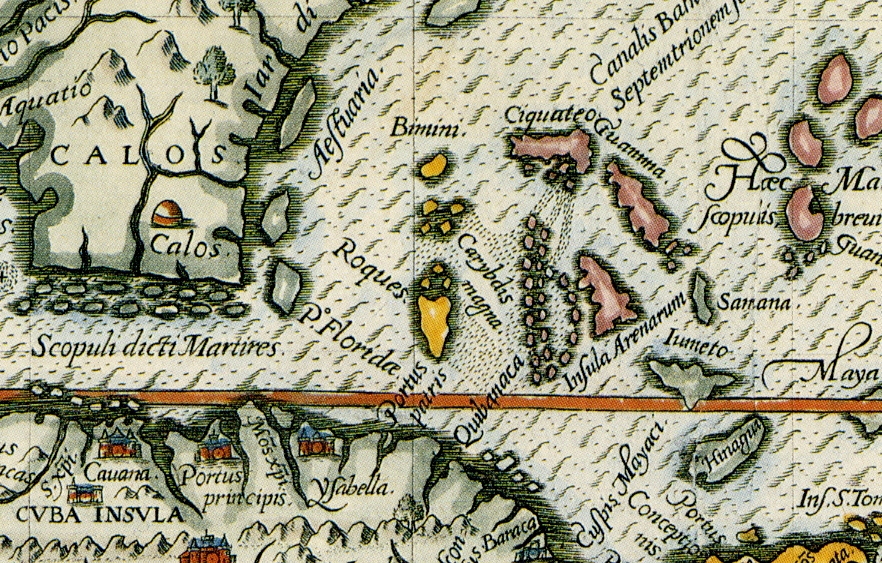
Los Roques in a 1594 Spanish map.

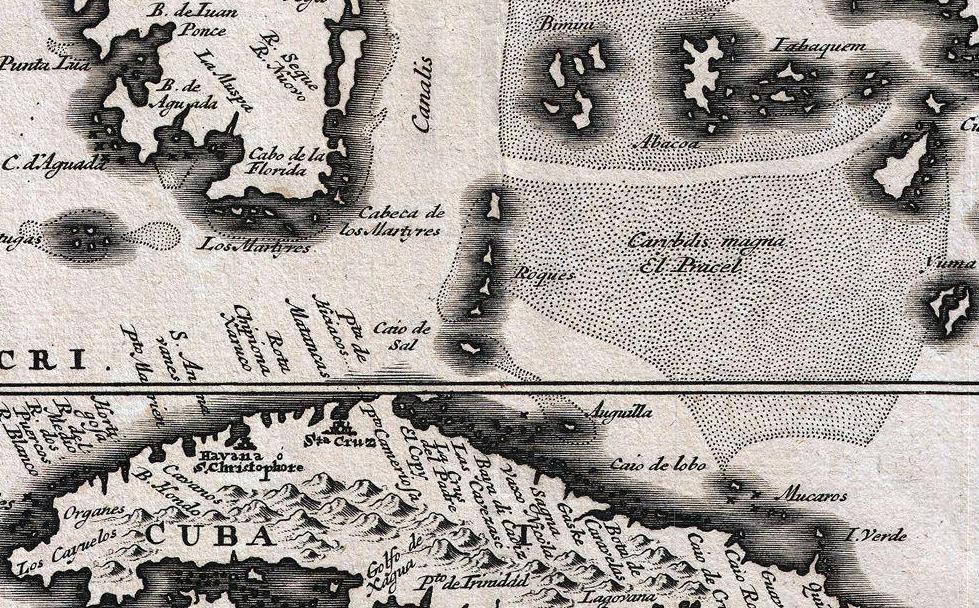
Los Roques in a 1696 Danckerts map.

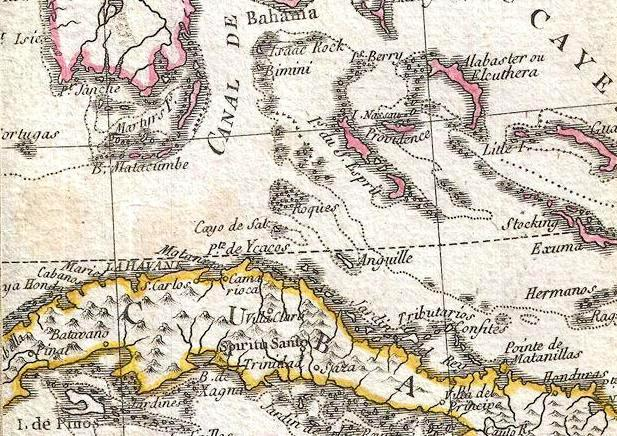
Los Roques in a 1779 map.

== See also ==
- List of lighthouses in the Bahamas
