= Compass Cay =

Island in The Bahamas

- Location within Bahamas

Geography
- Location: Atlantic Ocean
- Coordinates: 24°16′N 76°31′W
- Type: Cay
- Archipelago: Lucayan Archipelago

Administration
- Bahamas

Compass Cay is an island in The Bahamas, located in the Exuma district. The island, notable for its naturally-protected harbor, has been outfitted with a beach lodge and a marina. The island also has a famed population of docile nurse sharks. The nurse sharks in the marina have become a popular tourist attraction, bringing in visitors from as far as the island of Nassau. The marina has a small shop with trinkets and snacks. It is also developing a restaurant. There is a large maze of mangroves that lead out from the marina. Walking throughout the island, you can find a beach and a "landing strip," a long patch of sand only visible at low tide. There are also several cottages one can rent.
