= Big Farmer's Cay =

Island in the Bahamas

- Location within Bahamas

Geography
- Location: Caribbean Sea, Atlantic Ocean
- Coordinates: 23.9393°N 76.3015°W

Demographics
- Population: approx. 65 (2020)

Big Farmer's Cay is an island in The Bahamas.

== Popularity ==
The island is popular for its one mile long sandbar. It's widely known as the "Mile-long Sandbar". The site can only be reached by boat, and the trip may be difficult for individuals with physical disabilities or those using wheelchairs.

== Amenities ==
There are multiple restaurants on the island. Since these are at the beach, the food they have is caught fresh.

== Wildlife ==
There are exotic birds, dolphins, sharks, and tropical fish on the cay.

== Snorkeling ==
There are deep-sea caves and coral reefs for world-class snorkeling.
