= Walker's Cay National Park =

Marine national park in North Abaco, the Bahamas

- Location within Bahamas
- Location: North of Walker's Cay, the Bahamas
- Coordinates: 27.2815°N 78.3877°W
- Area: 3,840 acres (16 km^{2})
- Established: 2002
- Governing body: Bahamas National Trust
- Website: bnt.bs/walkers-cay-national-park/

Walker's Cay National Park is a marine national park north of Walker's Cay in North Abaco, the Bahamas. The park was established in 2002, and has an area of 3,840 acres (16 km^{2}). The park's marine environment has a barrier reef, which is used for underwater diving and snorkelling.

== Flora and fauna ==
The barrier reef contains coral, and provides habitat for pompano, amberjack, sharks, barracudas, tropical fish, turtles and eagle rays.
