= Walker's Cay =

Island in the Bahamas

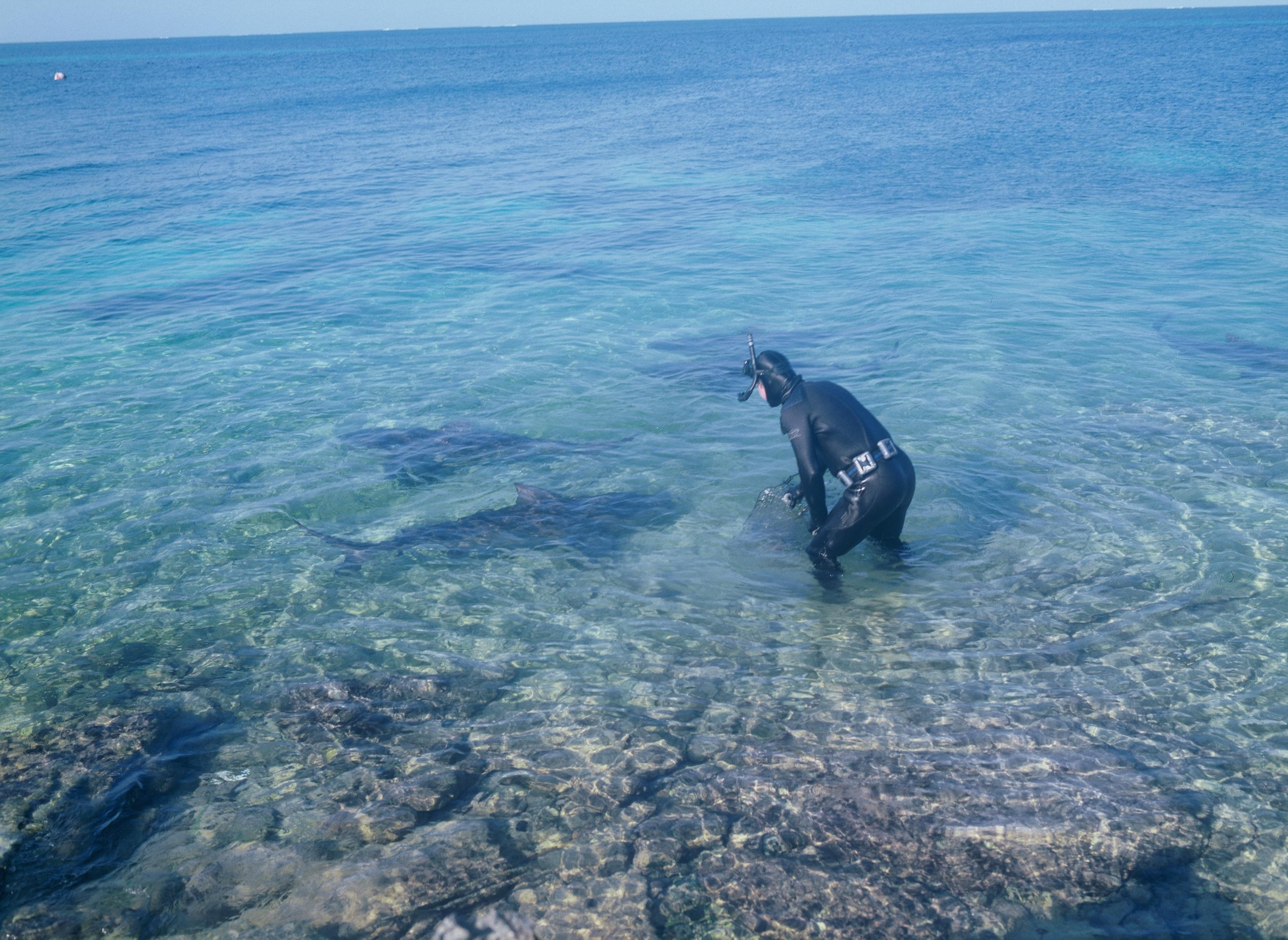
- Bull sharks hand fed from the beach at Walker's Cay

- Location within Bahamas

Geography
- Location: Caribbean
- Coordinates: 27°15′36″N 78°24′07″W
- Archipelago: Bahamas
- Area: 0.4 km^{2} (0.15 sq mi)

Administration
- Bahamas
- District: North Abaco

Demographics
- Population: Uninhabited (2014)

Additional information
- Time zone: EST (UTC−5)
  - Summer (DST): EDT (UTC−4)

Walker's Cay is the northernmost island in the Bahamas, part of the North Abaco district. Once a popular sport fishing location, the island was left deserted after 2004, following severe hurricane damage. The island is currently undergoing renovation under new owner Carl Allen, and celebrated the grand reopening of its marina in 2021.

== Geography ==
Walker's Cay lies 53 miles (85 km) to the northeast of West End, Grand Bahama and 105 miles northeast of Jupiter, Florida, in the northern Bahamas. Its surface is only about 100 acres (40 ha). The island sits on the edge of the Little Bahama Bank, the bank containing shallow, blue-colored water, averaging about 10 feet (3.0 m) in depth. However, on the north side of Walker's Cay, the water drops off sharply into deep blue ocean depths. The closest island is Grand Cay.

== History ==
A lack of natural fresh water kept the island uninhabited.

Walker's Cay was named after Thomas Walker, a British judge sent to the island to deal with piracy in the early 1700s.

After his death in 1721, the island remained uninhabited for over two hundred years.

=== Development as sport fishing location ===
In 1935, Buzz Shonnard, a businessman from Palm Beach, Florida, leased the land from the Bahamian government and built a small hotel, attracting anglers and tourists to the island. A 75-slip marina was built, and an airstrip, Walker's Cay Airport, with a 2,500-foot-long (760 m) runway suitable for light aircraft.

Shonnard's 99-year lease began an era in which Walker's Cay was a well-known sport fishing location. One of Walker's Cay's seasonal residents was American businessman Robert Abplanalp, the inventor of the modern-day aerosol valve for spray cans. Abplanalp bought the lease on the island in 1968 and continued to develop it as a sport fishing destination, not neglecting to pay attention to the conservation of marine life; he began encouraging tag-and-release fishing in the early 1970s. Walker's Cay was particularly known as a location for billfishing, with huge Atlantic blue marlin caught in the area; angling for bonefish was also popular there.

During World War II, Walker's Cay was used by the U.S. Navy as an advanced base for maritime patrol seaplanes from Scouting Squadron 39. The seaplane tender USS Christiana was based there to support the aircraft.

Various celebrities became regular visitors of Walker's Cay, including U.S. President Richard Nixon, actress Jane Fonda, singer Roger Daltrey and athletes like Davey Johnson and Roger Staubach.

The Walker's Cay marine area was declared a national park, Walker's Cay National Park, in 2002.

=== Destruction in 2004 hurricanes ===
Abplanalp died in 2003, and the following year the island's fortunes were dealt a further blow, when two severe hurricanes, Frances and Jeanne, destroyed the hotel and severely damaged the marina.

=== Redevelopment ===
In April 2018, Walker's Cay was sold to Texas businessman and philanthropist Carl Allen, who announced redevelopment efforts. By spring 2019, Allen was engaged in talks with Bahamian authorities on permitting plans. The island hosted sportfishing tournaments annually starting in 2021.
