= Hurricane Betsy =

Category 4 Atlantic hurricane in 1965

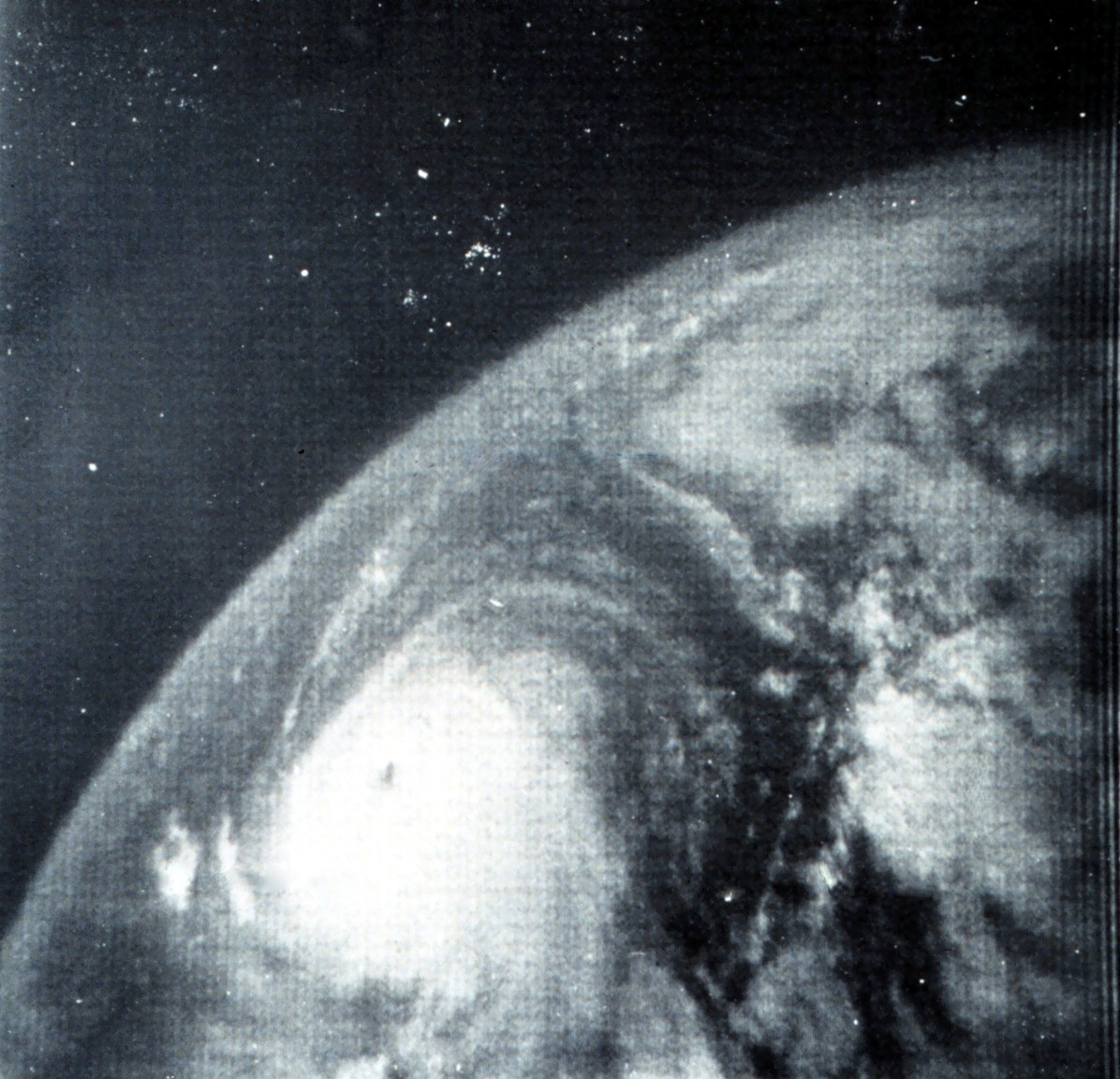
- Betsy north of the Turks and Caicos Islands from TIROS VIII on September 4, 1965

Meteorological history
- Formed: August 27, 1965
- Extratropical: September 12, 1965
- Dissipated: September 13, 1965

Category 4 major hurricane
- 1-minute sustained (SSHWS/NWS)
- Highest winds: 140 mph (220 km/h)
- Lowest pressure: 942 mbar (hPa); 27.82 inHg

Overall effects
- Fatalities: 81
- Damage: $1.43 billion (1965 USD)
- Areas affected: Lesser Antilles; The Bahamas; Florida; Louisiana; Mississippi; Arkansas, Tennessee, Missouri
- IBTrACS
- Part of the 1965 Atlantic hurricane season

Hurricane Betsy was an erratic and destructive tropical cyclone that brought widespread damage to areas of Florida, the Bahamas, and the central United States Gulf Coast in September 1965. The storm's unusual path, coupled with its intensity and minimal preparation time contributed to making Betsy the first tropical cyclone in the Atlantic basin to accrue at least $1 billion in damage. (Note: All monetary figures are in 1965 United States dollars unless otherwise noted.) While the storm primarily affected areas of southern Florida and Louisiana, lesser effects were felt in the Bahamas and as far inland in the United States as the Ohio River Valley. Betsy began as a tropical depression north of French Guiana on August 27, and strengthened as it moved in a general northwesterly direction. After executing a slight anticyclonic loop north of the Bahamas, Betsy proceeded to move through areas of south Florida on September 8, causing extensive crop damage. After emerging into the Gulf of Mexico, the cyclone strengthened and reached its peak intensity equivalent to that of a Category 4 hurricane on September 10 before making its final landfall near Grand Isle, Louisiana, shortly thereafter. Once inland, Betsy was slow to weaken, and persisted for two more days before degenerating into an extratropical storm; these remnants lasted until September 13.

As a developing tropical cyclone, Betsy tracked over the northern Leeward Islands, producing moderate gusts and slight rainfall, though only minimal damage was reported. After tracking over open waters for several days, Betsy had significantly strengthened upon moving through the Bahamas. There, considerable damage occurred, particularly to crops on the archipelago's islands. For the island chain, Betsy was considered the worst hurricane since a tropical cyclone impacted the region in 1929. Widespread power outage and property damage ensued due to the storm's strong winds. Overall, damage on the Bahamas amounted to at least $14 million, and one fatality occurred. From there Betsy tracked westward and made landfall on southern Florida, where it was considered the worst tropical cyclone since a hurricane in 1926. Betsy's strong storm surge inundated large portions of the Florida Keys, flooding streets and causing widespread damage. The only route out of the Keys onto the mainland was cut off by the storm. In the state alone, Betsy caused $139 million in damage and five deaths.

Betsy's most severe impacts were felt in Louisiana, where it made landfall as a powerful Category 4 hurricane. The cyclone propelled damaging storm surge into Lake Pontchartrain, breaching levees in New Orleans and inundating several neighborhoods, most notably the lower Ninth Ward. Strong winds caused widespread power and telecommunications outages across the region. Further inland, effects wrought by Betsy were considerably weaker, though precipitation caused by the storm extended as far northeast as Pennsylvania. Rainfall was primarily beneficial in Arkansas, though localized flooding impacted rice and cotton crops. In Kentucky and Illinois, strong winds caused moderate property damage. By the time the remnants of Betsy moved into the northeastern United States, the storm's winds and rainfall had substantially lessened, and as such resulting wind damage was negligible while precipitation benefited crops. In total, the damage wrought by Betsy throughout its existence equated to roughly $1.43 billion, making it the costliest Atlantic hurricane at the time. In addition the hurricane caused 81 deaths, primarily in Louisiana. After the season, the United States Weather Bureau retired the name Betsy from their rotating lists of tropical cyclone names.

== Meteorological history ==
Map plotting the storm's track and intensity, according to the Saffir–Simpson scale Map key Saffir–Simpson scale Tropical depression (≤38 mph, ≤62 km/h) Tropical storm (39–73 mph, 63–118 km/h) Category 1 (74–95 mph, 119–153 km/h) Category 2 (96–110 mph, 154–177 km/h) Category 3 (111–129 mph, 178–208 km/h) Category 4 (130–156 mph, 209–251 km/h) Category 5 (≥157 mph, ≥252 km/h) Unknown Storm type Tropical cyclone Subtropical cyclone Extratropical cyclone, remnant low, tropical disturbance, or monsoon depression

Origins of Hurricane Betsy can be traced back to an area of disturbed weather southwest of Cape Verde that first identified via TIROS satellite imagery on August 23. Tracking westward, the tropical wave was intercepted by a United States Navy reconnaissance airplane early on August 27, which concluded that the disturbance had become a tropical cyclone of moderate intensity. Based on information from the flight, it was estimated that the system had organized into a tropical depression by 0000 UTC on August 27, 350 mi (560 km) east-southeast of Barbados. Although operationally the United States Weather Bureau office in San Juan, Puerto Rico upgraded the disturbance to tropical storm intensity three hours after their first tropical cyclone bulletin that same day, (Note: Until the inception of the present-day National Hurricane Center in 1966, the United States Weather Bureau and later Miami Hurricane Warning Office handled tropical cyclone operations in the northern Atlantic basin.) post-analysis indicated that the tropical depression had remained at the same intensity up until 1200 UTC on August 29. Nonetheless, the tropical cyclone was given the name Betsy for a period of time as a tropical depression, contrary to typical tropical cyclone naming procedure. As Betsy approached the Windward Islands, it began to move in a more northwesterly direction, and was briefly located in the Caribbean Sea during the overnight hours of August 28 before re-emerging into the Atlantic Ocean the following day, after which Betsy was upgraded to tropical storm classification in post-analysis.

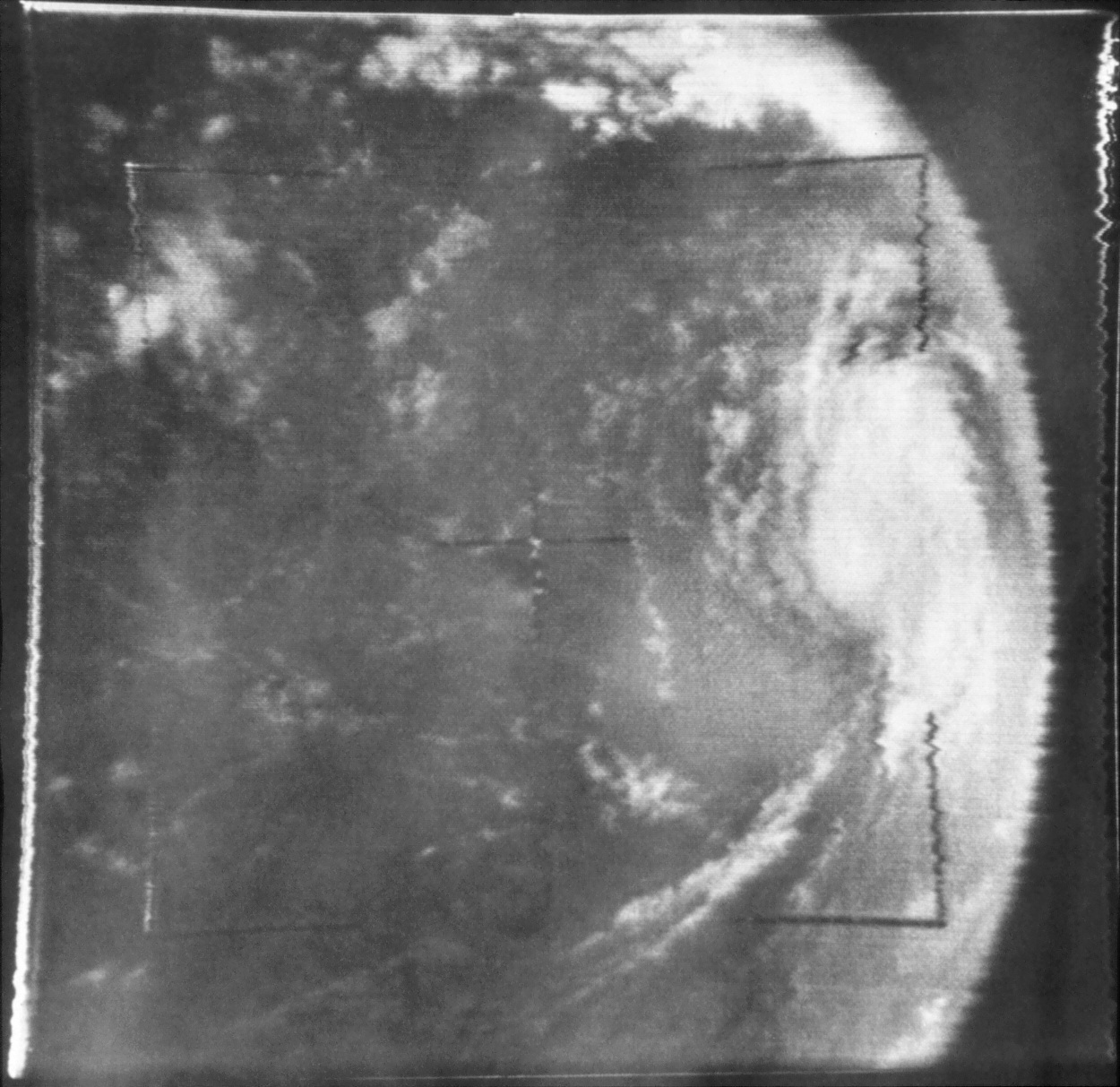
Betsy prior to being upgraded to hurricane intensity on August 29.

Upon moving to the northwest of the Leeward Islands, Betsy entered conditions favorable for marked development. An upper-level trough centered a short distance north of the tropical storm enhanced outflow conditions and speed divergence. Under these conditions, Betsy proceeded to quickly intensify, and reconnaissance missions tasked by the United States Air Force (Note: Betsy saw the first use of the now-familiar WC-130 Hercules in the Hurricane Hunter role, with a "fix" mission into the eye of the storm on 27 August.) and Weather Bureau indicated that the tropical storm had reached hurricane intensity by 0000 UTC on August 30, centered roughly 200 mi (320 km) north-northeast of Puerto Rico. By coincidence, forecast responsibilities were transferred to the Weather Bureau Office in Miami, Florida at the same time; however, the hurricane was still under the purview of the Weather Bureau per se. Due to increasing atmospheric pressure heights to the north, Betsy drastically slowed in forward speed and intensification, and remained stationary for a period of time on August 31 before it began to drift westward. On September 2, Betsy began to quickly intensify, and after strengthening to a Category 3 – a major hurricane on the modern-day Saffir–Simpson hurricane wind scale (Note: A major hurricane is a storm that ranks as Category 3 or higher on the Saffir–Simpson hurricane wind scale.) – the small hurricane attained Category 4 intensity and reached an initial peak intensity with winds of 140 mph (220 km/h) at 0000 UTC on September 4, while situated well north of the Turks and Caicos.

However, on September 5, a blocking ridge of high pressure situated over the Eastern United States forced Betsy to make a tight, clockwise loop and track in an unusual southwesterly path, redirecting it towards Florida and The Bahamas. At roughly the same time, the hurricane weakened to Category 2 intensity, though it later restrengthened to Category 3 intensity on September 6. Betsy's atypical southwesterly path brought it directly over several islands in the northern Bahamas, including Great Abaco Island. After stalling for a third time over portions of the central Bahamas, the major hurricane resumed its prior westward track towards South Florida. Early on September 8, Betsy made landfall on Key Largo in extreme southeastern Florida with winds of 125 mph (205 km/h) and a minimum barometric pressure of 953 mbar (hPa; 28.15 inHg). Without much change in strength, the intense hurricane quickly traversed the Upper Keys and Florida Bay before emerging midday on September 8 into the Gulf of Mexico.

Situated in the warm waters of the Gulf of Mexico on September 8, Betsy began to strengthen and accelerate towards the west and then northwest, under the influence of the same ridge of high pressure that had forced it southwestward three days prior. At roughly the same time, hurricane forecast operations were handed over the Weather Bureau Office in New Orleans, Louisiana. During its trek through the gulf, Betsy accelerated to a maximum forward speed of 22 mph (35 km/h), a speed anomalously high for a tropical cyclone traversing the Gulf of Mexico. At 0600 UTC on September 9, the hurricane was estimated to have regained Category 4 intensity, and continued to strengthen as it neared the Central United States Gulf Coast. At 0000 UTC the next day, Betsy reached its primary peak intensity with winds of 140 mph (220 km/h) and a minimum central pressure of 942 mbar (hPa; 27.79 inHg) shortly before moving ashore a rural area of Louisiana coastline adjacent to Houma and Grand Isle early on September 10. Once inland, Betsy quickly weakened, and paralleled the Mississippi River before degenerating into a tropical depression by 0600 UTC the following day. Afterwards, it began to track northeastward along the Ohio River before it transitioned into an extratropical cyclone on September 12. The remnant extratropical circulation of Betsy persisted into southern Ohio before dissipating entirely by 0000 UTC on September 13.

== Preparations ==
=== The Bahamas, Cuba, and Florida ===
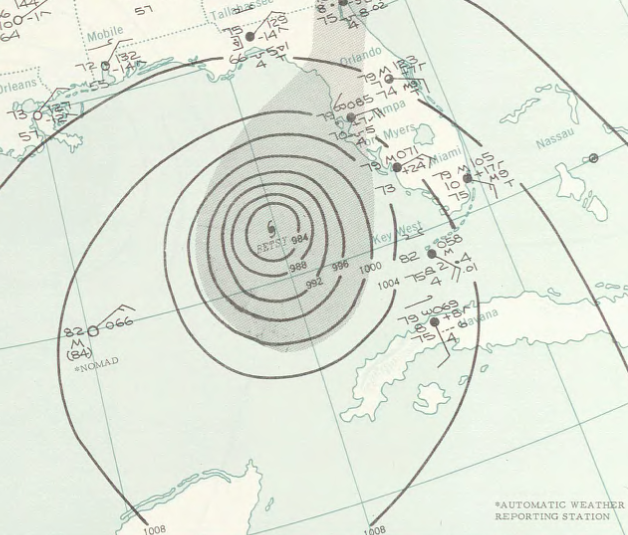
Surface weather analysis map of Betsy on September 9

At Cape Kennedy, NASA delayed the erection of an Atlas-Centaur rocket which was to be used to launch a craft towards the Moon as part of the Surveyor Program on September 2. Several other prepared rockets on the site's launch pads were readied for potential emergency scramble should the hurricane impact the area. Other American space personnel stationed in Grand Turk Island and Mayaguana began preparatory measures after the United States Air Force issued a No. 1 alert for the region. Personnel from a small outpost on Allan Cay were evacuated to Grand Bahama, despite indications at the time that Betsy would curve away from the Bahamas or the East Coast of the United States. At Brunswick, Georgia's Naval Air Station Glynco, 21 jet fighter-bombers were evacuated inland. On September 4, helicopters arrived at the Frying Pan Shoals Light to evacuate the lighthouse's operators due to the impending threat of a hurricane strike. In the Palm Beach area, a group composed of regional Red Cross disaster chairman Forest W. Dana and nearby town officials held a nearly nonstop radio vigil service. Red Cross volunteers in The Carolinas set up three district headquarters to prepare shelters, first aid programs, and communications. The relief agency also readied seven first aid and food vans in the cities of New Bern and Wilmington in North Carolina and Charleston, South Carolina. The United States Department of Agriculture prepared food supplies in the event of an emergency for the two states.

After Betsy stalled and assumed a southwesterly course towards southern Florida, precautionary measures ceased in the Carolinas but were initiated in Florida and The Bahamas. Mackey Airlines assisted in the evacuation of 227 residents of West End Island to Miami, Fort Lauderdale, and West Palm Beach, Florida, over the course of three flights. Three additional Douglas DC-6 airliners from Mackey Airlines evacuated 240 people, primarily American tourists, from Nassau to Miami. Various commercial flights between the archipelago and Florida were cancelled due to the impending storm. In Florida, various relief agencies prepared 9,000 hot dogs, 8,000 hamburgers, and 6,000 servings of chicken, to be donated to local hospitals and charitable organizations. The United States Weather Bureau urged for the reopening of grocery stores and lumberyards which had been closed for Labor Day in order to increase availability of hurricane preparedness materials to potentially affected populations. In downtown Miami, a traffic coordination plan for the evacuation of vehicles and aquatic craft through the Brickell Avenue Bridge was set in place. Homestead Air Reserve Base went into Phase 2 of its hurricane preparedness plan, in which aircraft stationed at the base were serviced for potential evacuation to bases in Michigan and Indiana. Upon Betsy's recurvature southwestward toward the peninsula on September 7, the Weather Bureau strongly advised evacuation procedures between Fort Lauderdale and Key Largo. Evacuation was strongly advised in the Florida Keys, where rising water as a result of the storm could potentially flood over portions of U.S. Route 1 – the only primary access route from the Keys to the mainland. Overall, an estimated 50,000 residents were within coastal regions where evacuations were advised. The U.S. Navy abandoned its housing project on Big Pine Key to avoid the hurricane, while sheriff deputies in Marathon, Tavernier, and Islamorada strongly advised evacuation in those respective cities. Various offices, businesses, and schools were closed in advance of the hurricane. Airlines cancelled service to Fort Lauderdale and Miami. In the latter, city crews dismantled traffic lights along Biscayne Boulevard; such procedure was influenced by the damage wrought by Hurricane Cleo a year prior.

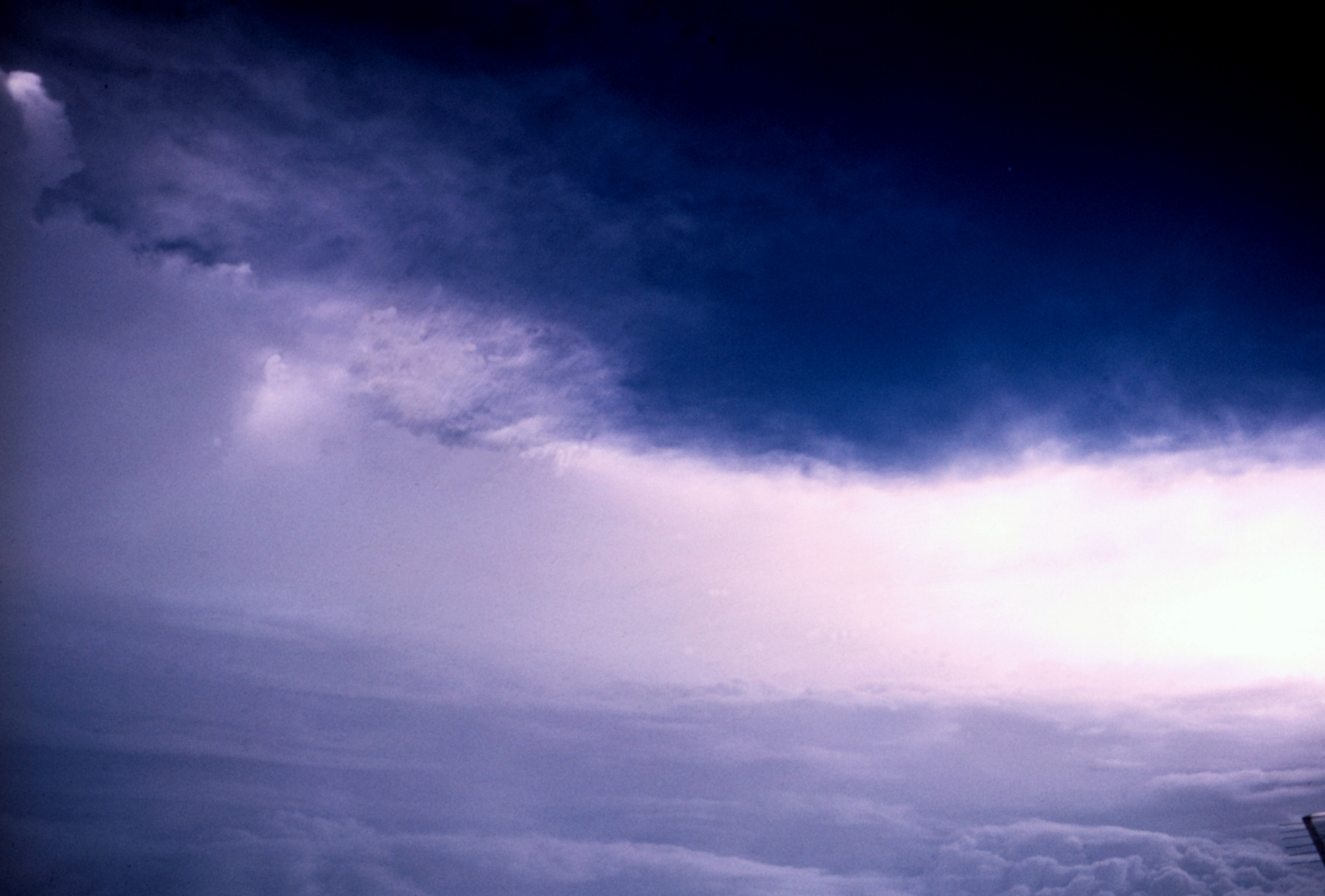
A view from a Hurricane Hunter aircraft in the eye of Hurricane Betsy on September 3.

On September 7, the United States Weather Bureau predicted that Betsy would make landfall in Matanzas Province in Cuba. The National Observatory of Cuba expressed concern for the island's northern coast from the provinces of Havana to Camagüey, and in particular the provinces of Matanzas and Las Villas. (Note: The former Cuban province of Las Villas, initially known as Santa Clara until 1940, was split into the present-day provinces of Villa Clara, Cienfuegos, and Sancti Spíritus in 1978.) Cuban radio alerted residents along the country's northern coast, potentially threatened by the hurricane, to take the necessary precautions in the event of an emergency. Radio services in Havana alerted residents along the shores of Pinar del Río Province of potentially dangerous storm surge, and urged immediate precautionary measures.

=== Watches and warnings ===
Upon the operational development of Betsy into a tropical storm on August 27, the San Juan Weather Bureau Office issued gale warnings for Barbados, St. Vincent and the Grenadines, and Martinique. The weather office advised for small craft in the Windward and Leeward Islands to remain in port until the storm passed. These gale warnings were later expanded to include Dominica and Guadeloupe the next day. Midday on August 28, warnings were lowered for Barbados and St. Vincent and the Grenadines, and raised for areas of the northern Leeward Islands and later Puerto Rico. Late that day, warnings in Dominica and Guadeloupe were discontinued. All warnings associated with the developing tropical cyclone were discontinued for a period of time on August 29, as Betsy was pulling away from any landmasses. After the hurricane temporarily stalled and began to track westward on September 1, the Weather Bureau began to warn interests in the Bahamas. Though no warnings were specified, the tropical cyclone tracking agency forecasted winds of potentially hurricane-force and strong surf to impact the Turks and Caicos Islands and Mayaguana; such forecasts were changed after Betsy began tracking northwest. Threatening the coasts of Georgia and The Carolinas on September 4, the Weather Bureau announced the possibility of a hurricane watch for those coastal areas, but decided to delay the issuance of such watches due to Betsy's slow movement at the time. Nonetheless, the organization advised for small craft in coastal waters adjacent to the coast between Cape Kennedy to Sandy Hook, New Jersey to remain in port, and other small craft north of Miami, Florida and into Bahamian waters to exercise caution. As a result of Betsy executing a loop and beginning to tracking southwestward, these watches were never issued, however, the Weather Bureau advised extreme caution in several Bahamian islands, though once again no warnings were specified. However, general emergency hurricane warning was issued early on September 16 for islands in the northern Bahamas, as well as adjacent waters. Hurricane watches and gale warnings were also issued for surrounding islands at the same time. These warnings and watch products for the Bahamas held until late on September 7.

Early on September 6, as Betsy was tracking through the Bahamas, a hurricane watch and gale warning were issued for portions of the Southeastern Floridian coast from Cape Kennedy to Key West. Late that day, however, areas of the watch zone from Palm Beach to Key West and Everglades City were upgraded to hurricane emergency warning status. Additional hurricane watches were hoisted for areas of Florida's western coast from Everglades City to Punta Gorda. The following evening, the hurricane emergency warning zone was expanded to include areas of the east coast northward to Fort Pierce and on the west coast northward to Venice. Gale warnings were also expanded to include coastal areas from Jacksonville to St. Marks. Hurricane watches were similarly extended to include coastal regions of Florida from the boundaries of the hurricane warnings to Daytona Beach and Cedar Keys on the peninsula's eastern and western coasts, respectively. Once Betsy began moving through the peninsula, however, warning and watch products began to be discontinued by regions, with all products pertaining to Florida discontinued by midday on September 8. After leaving the Florida area, the first hurricane watch pertaining to the Central Gulf Coast of the United States occurred late on September 8, when the Weather Bureau office in New Orleans issued a hurricane watch for coastal areas from Matagorda Bay to the Mississippi River Delta. Early the following day, hurricane emergency warnings were issued for areas stretching from Galveston, Texas to the Mississippi River Delta and gale warnings elsewhere from Mobile Bay to Matagorda Bay. Upon completing its northwestward recurvature, hurricane emergency warnings were shifted eastward to include areas from the mouth of the Mississippi River Delta to Mobile, Alabama. Gale warnings were effected by this change, and as such were also extended to include areas west of Panama City, Florida. On September 9, hurricane warnings were once again extended eastward to Pensacola, Florida, while they were lowered for the Texas coast. These warnings remained in effect until September 10, by which time Betsy had weakened sufficiently enough not to warrant such warnings and watches.

== Impact ==
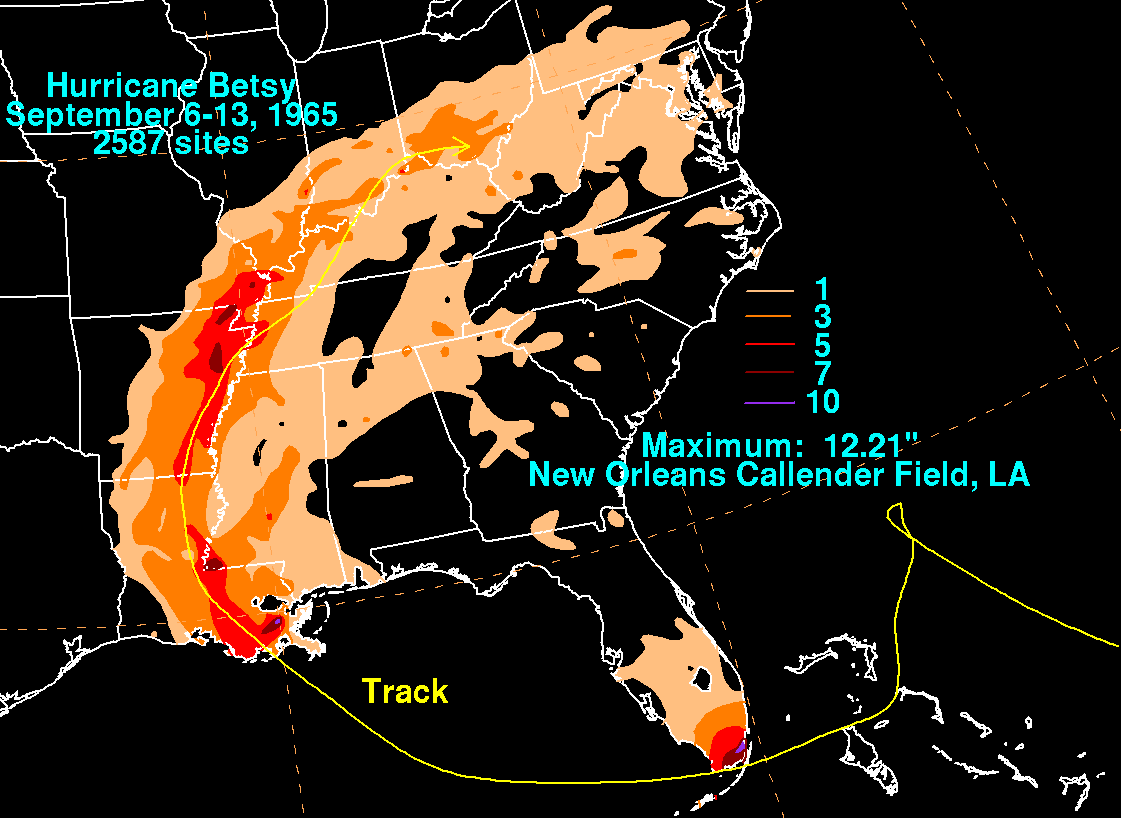
Rainfall totals in the United States

The effects of Hurricane Betsy were of far-reaching and unprecedented severity. Though the extent of impacts were limited to the Bahamas and portions of the United States, the damage in these respective regions were considerable. According to the Hurricane Research Division of the Atlantic Oceanographic and Meteorological Laboratory, Betsy produced Category 3 winds (111 mph (179 km/h) or greater) in Southeastern Florida and Southeastern Louisiana. However, winds of such intensity were also reported in the Bahamas. The final, enumerated damage figure of $1.42 billion in damage costs made Betsy the first tropical cyclone in the United States to accrue more than $1 billion in damage, unadjusted for inflation. For this reason, the tropical cyclone was nicknamed "Billion Dollar Betsy."

=== The Bahamas ===
During Betsy's initial approach of the Bahamian archipelago on September 2, strong surf and high swells were reported in the Southeastern islands, though no damage was reported. Much of the damage inflicted to the Bahamas by Betsy occurred between September 6–8, when the tropical cyclone moved across the northern Bahamas as a Category 3 hurricane. The preceding track was similar to that of another major hurricane in 1929, which had also drastically curved southwestward before causing significant damage to the island group. Likewise, Betsy was considered the worst hurricane to strike the region since then. Stalling over the Bahamas for a period of time as it moved through the islands, several locations sustained the Betsy's effects for prolonged periods of time, despite the tropical cyclone's relatively small size. Widespread power outage and communication blackouts ensued, preventing the flow of reports between the northern Bahamas and other outlets as the storm took place.

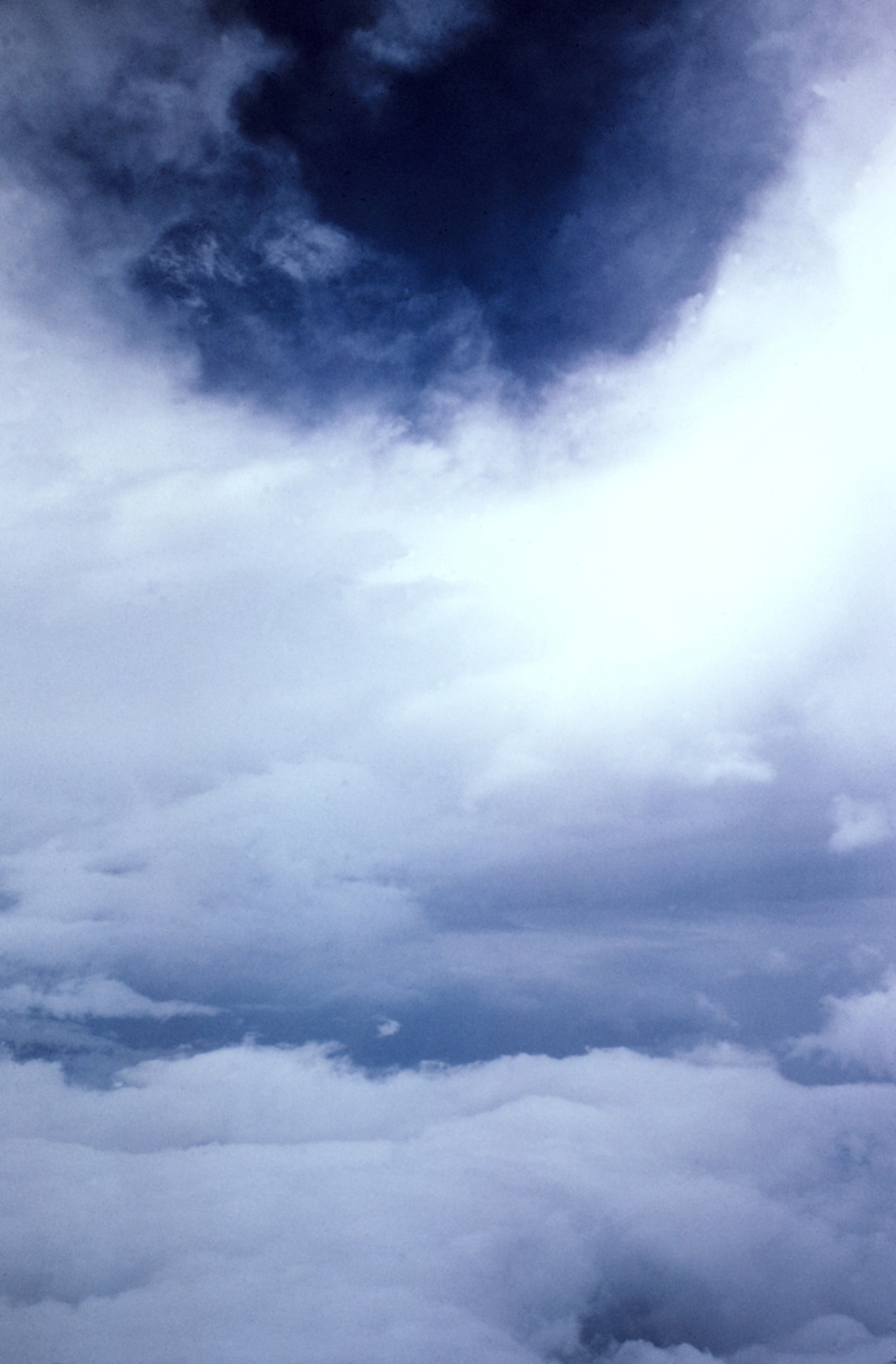
In the eye of Hurricane Betsy.

This included NASA communication centers in Cape Kennedy, which had lost contact with downrange missile tracking stations in the archipelago. Over the duration of the hurricane, the lowest pressure measured was 961 mbar (hPa; 28.40 inHg) in Dunmore Town on Harbour Island. However, no wind measurement was recorded alongside the pressure reading due to a resulting power failure.

Offshore, the Dutch freighter Sarah Elizabeth was caught in rough seas and had lost control of its rudder while it was pulled by continuous wave action towards Egg Island. As a result, the ship's operators relayed a SOS signal, to which the United States Coast Guard responded by dispatching a cutter and several merchant ships to assist in escorting the stricken freighter to safety. However, roughly five hours later the crew of the Sarah Elizabeth was able to navigate to safer waters within the Providence Channel. Two luxury yachts within the harbor were destroyed, with dozens of smaller craft damaged, as a result of the wind and waves.

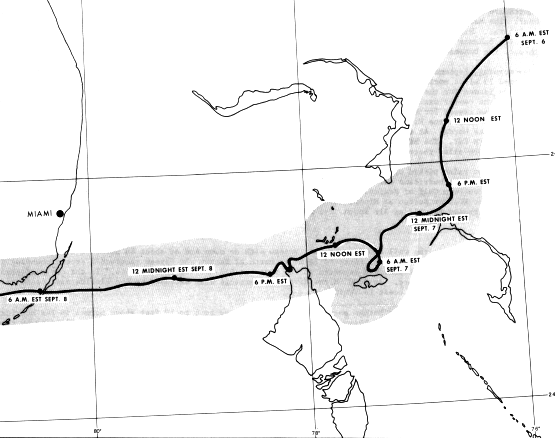
Track of Betsy through the Bahamas

Passing to the north of Nassau, Betsy caused considerable damage to the capital city and the rest of New Providence Island as the hurricane's eyewall stalled over the area. The last message received by the Miami Weather Bureau office from communication operators in Nassau during the storm was a report of 80 mph (130 km/h) winds and rough seas late on September 6. The strong winds downed power lines, trees, and destroyed homes, while the heavy rainfall, having accumulated over several days, flooding city streets. Other streets were littered with coconuts, palm fronds, and other debris blown or felled by the strong winds. Heavy loss of shrubbery was also reported due to the storm's effects. A strong storm surge estimated at 10 ft (3.0 m) swept into the Bay Street waterfront shopping district, inundating the renowned shopping area. The local police detachment, which had been holed up within a waterfront barracks, was forced to take refuge in a nearby high school due to the storm surge. Along the coast, 500 American tourists remained stranded in waterfront hotels. Despite the severe effects, only one person died in the Nassau area after his ship was destroyed and capsized in Nassau Harbor; this would be the only fatality associated with Betsy in the Bahamas.

On West End on Grand Bahama, a weather station reported maximum sustained winds of 89 mph (143 km/h), with other locations elsewhere on the island experiencing gusts of at least 60 mph (97 km/h). However, no damage was reported. Out of all the islands, the strongest winds were reported on Abaco Island, where areas were within Betsy's swath of hurricane-force winds for over 20 hours. In Green Turtle Cay, a station clocked winds of 151 mph (243 km/h), well into Category 4 intensity on the modern-day Saffir–Simpson hurricane scale. Another station in Hope Town measured a peak wind gust of 178 mph (286 km/h). The entirety of Hope Town was covered with sand to a depth of 2 ft (0.61 m), and the local harbor club was extensively damaged. Other docks were either damaged or completely destroyed. Though there was relatively little rainfall, coastal flooding damaged many houses to a point beyond repair. In Marsh Harbour, a majority of homes were unroofed. Heavy crop and fruit tree losses were reported in Little and Northern Abaco, with damage enumerated at well over a million dollars. In the southern Berry Islands, which experienced hurricane-force winds for over 25 hours and the eye for 3 hours, all the islands suffered damage of some degree. Frazers Hog Cay had several houses badly damaged, one totally destroyed and the entire power distribution destroyed. Only Bird Cay, which had underground utilities, was able to restore electricity and water the next day. The harbor at Chub Cay was severely damaged. and would take months to repair.

Across the northern portion of Eleuthera Island, Betsy wrought considerable damage. Communications from the island's missile tracking center were lost, with the last transmitted message indicating winds of 130 mph (210 km/h) which subsequently destroyed an anemometer. A submarine communications cable connecting the missile tracking center to Cape Kennedy was cut by the strong wave action. In Tarpum Baya police station sustained heavy damage after being hit by storm surge. Other coastal installments and property were severely damaged by the waves. The Glass Window Bridge was also damaged by the storm surge. Elsewhere, vehicles were damaged by fallen debris kicked up by the strong winds associated with Betsy. Overall, Hurricane Betsy caused an estimated $14 million in damage across the Bahamas, primarily to crops. Insurance claims were estimated at $4 million. The low death toll from the hurricane was accredited by the United States Weather Bureau to the relatively low storm tide, which, although rough, was negligible in areas including in Nassau, and the heeding of posted hurricane warnings by the affected populations.

=== Florida ===
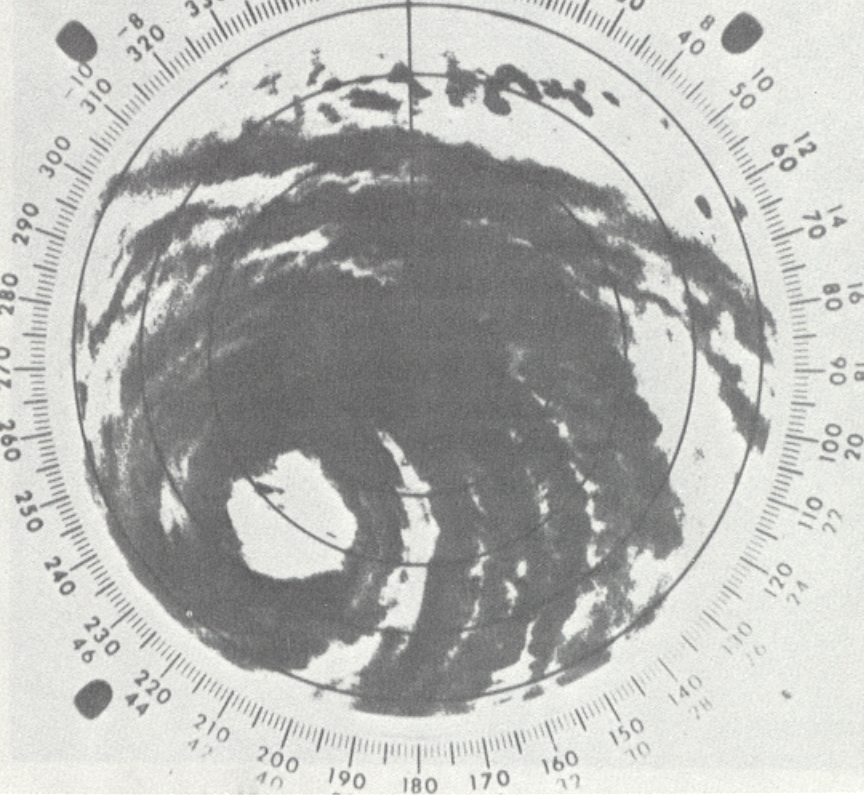
WSR-57 radar image of Betsy near Miami on September 8

Beginning on September 7, intermittent squalls associated with Betsy's outer rainbands began affecting the coast, producing gusts in excess of 60 mph (97 km/h). One of these squalls toppled trees and damaged awnings in Stuart. Early the following day, Betsy made landfall on the southeastern Florida coast near Key Largo with a strength equivalent to that of a Category 3 hurricane. Intense winds were felt across the region, with the highest officially wind speed clocked at 125 mph (201 km/h) in Big Pine Key; the same station also recorded the strongest gust documented while Betsy was over southern Florida at 165 mph (266 km/h). The lowest barometric pressure recorded was 952 mbar (hPa; 28.12 inHg) at a station in Tavernier while it was within the eye of the storm.

The strong winds knocked down utility poles, causing widespread power outage and a telecommunications blackout. At one point, an estimated 25,000 telephones were knocked out of service, with half of the central telephone exchange operating on emergency backup power. Some transformers that were blown down sparked localized fires. One person was killed after being electrocuted by a fallen power line. The blackouts cut electric service to 80 percent of customers in the Miami and Fort Lauderdale areas. House trailers were smashed by flying debris in the same areas. Several roads were blocked by debris thrown by the wind. U.S. Highway 1 in Florida was cut off by fallen telephone poles, preventing land access from the mainland to the Florida Keys. Similarly, numerous portions of the Tamiami Trail were blocked by fallen trees. A person was killed after a prostrated tree fell, crushing the individual. At the Miami International Airport, two twin-engine cargo craft were blown off the airport's perimeter. Heavy agricultural losses resulted from the strong winds as well. Approximately 25 to 50 percent of Florida's citrus crop was damaged after being blown down by strong winds. In addition, 90 percent of Dade and Broward counties' avocado crop, valued at $2 million, was destroyed.

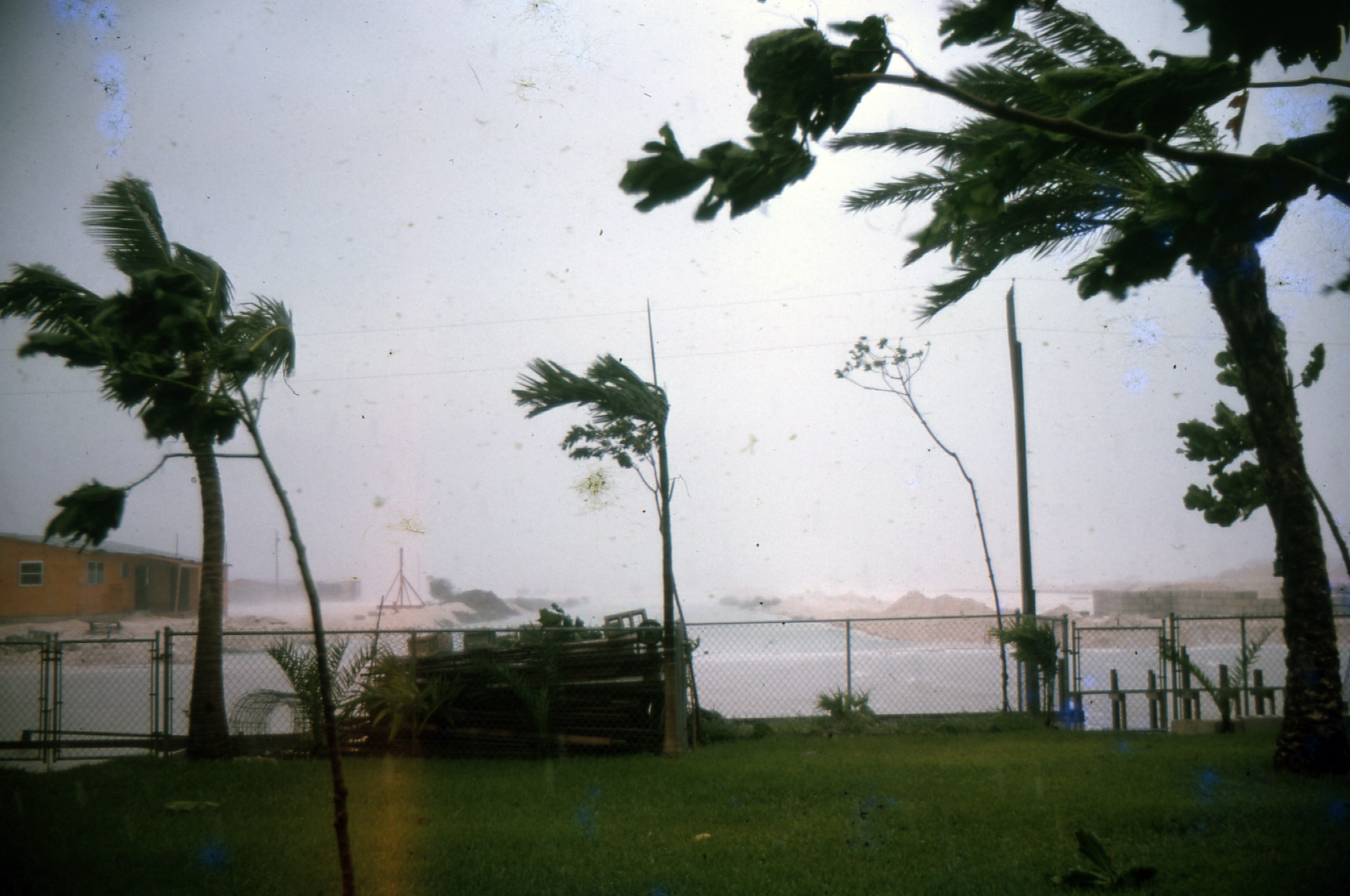
Riviera Canal in Key West battered by storm surge flooding during Hurricane Betsy

Much of the damage inflicted in the state was caused by an unusually strong storm surge, which inundated the coastal and low-lying areas of Florida. Although the strongest storm surge was positioned north of the eye, away from the more densely populated regions of Greater Miami, an abnormally high storm tide still prevailed and caused extensive damage along the southern coast of the peninsula. Northerly winds well in advance of Betsy's landfall forced water from Florida Bay onto the Florida Keys, and the resulting damage was then further exacerbated when southerly winds during and after the hurricane's approach forced water from the Atlantic onto the isolated Keys. Storm surge was further exacerbated by (this writer remembers) high tide (cannot substantiate) and near full moon at the peak of the storm in the Miami area. This resident living one block north of the Miami city line remembers the waters of Biscayne Bay came within mm of entering his family's home on NE 88th Street perhaps 300 meters from the bay. Though storm surge was estimated to have peaked along the coast of North Key Largo at 9 ft (2.7 m), a measurement of 7.7 ft (2.3 m) in Tavernier was the highest measured total. However, a high water mark of 9 ft (2.7 m) on a highway west of Sugarloaf Key indicated that such estimations in North Key Largo were valid. The strong storm surge caused severe beach erosion, mostly to areas south of Clearwater on the state's western coast while Betsy was traversing the Gulf of Mexico. In Fort Pierce, the waves washed away up to 10 ft (3.0 m) of beach.

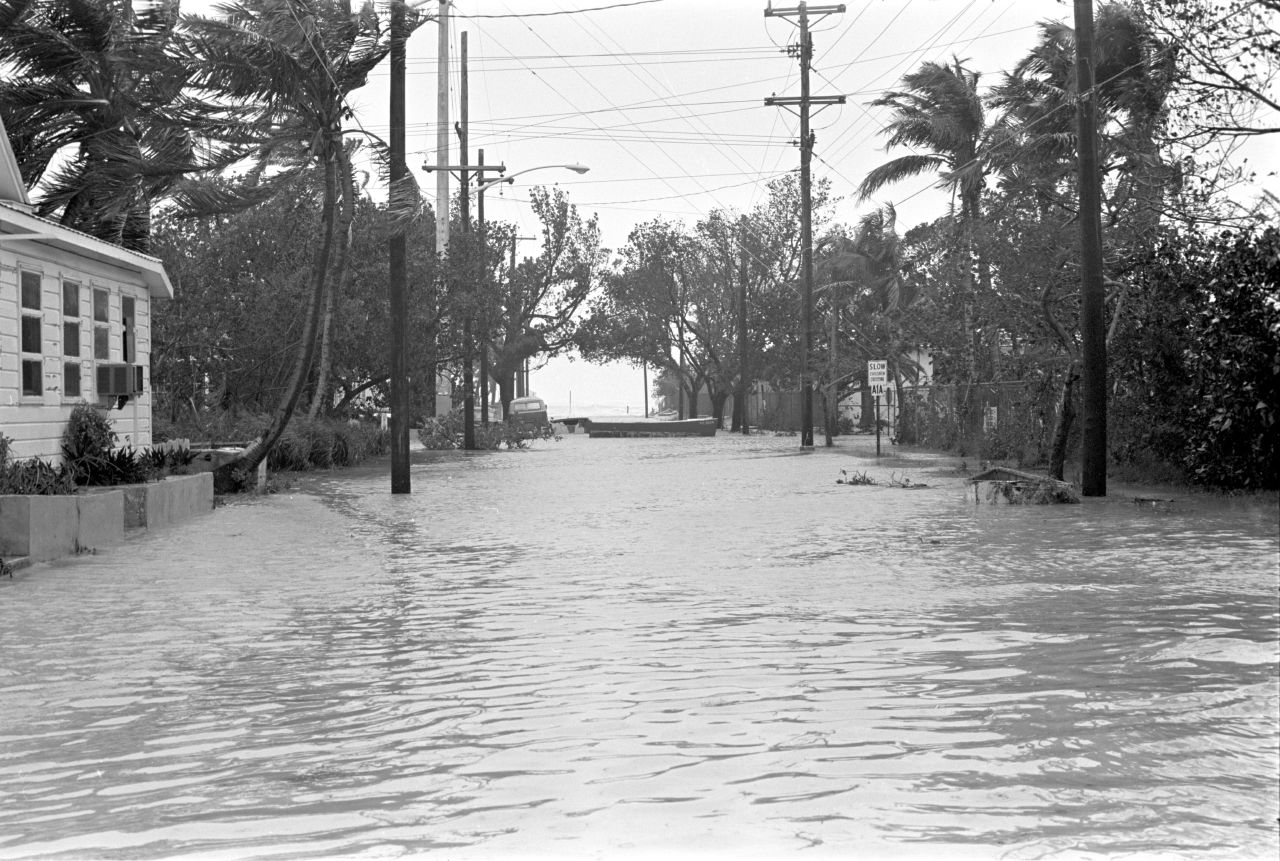
Street flooding in Key West

Coastal flooding in the Upper Keys was severe, with areas being inundated under several feet of seawater. Along the Miami Beach waterfront, a storm tide measuring 6.1 ft (1.9 m) caused extensive damage to shoreline property along Biscayne Bay. Eight people on the beach were injured, primarily due to flying glass shards. Roads were inundated, with water exceeding the first floor heights of some buildings. As a result of the waves and wind, three barges were torn out of their moorings, and later drifted downwind before severing a portion of the Rickenbacker Causeway, rendering it impassable and isolating Key Biscayne from the mainland. Along the waterfront, the waves blew into hotels and shoreline residences.

Offshore, the strong waves caused a freighter to run aground near Palm Beach, and nine people became stranded in houseboats near a mangrove island in Biscayne Bay. Another cargo ship, the Panamanian, ran aground within Lake Worth Inlet. At Key Largo, a 50 ft (15 m) sailboat was blown out of the water onto an adjacent neighborhood. Elsewhere in Key Largo, homes were unroofed by the strong winds, with other buildings damaged by flying debris. Water forced into the Miami River caused it to overflow its banks and spread inland for several city blocks in Miami. In the Miami area, Betsy caused the most severe seawater inundation since a major hurricane struck in 1926; this record was attributed to the highest storm surge reported in as many years. A 5 mi (8.0 km) section of State Road A1A, which runs adjacent to Miami and the nearby beach, was blocked by sand dunes piled inland by the strong winds. The high tide also washed out some portions of the road between Fort Lauderdale and Pompano Beach.

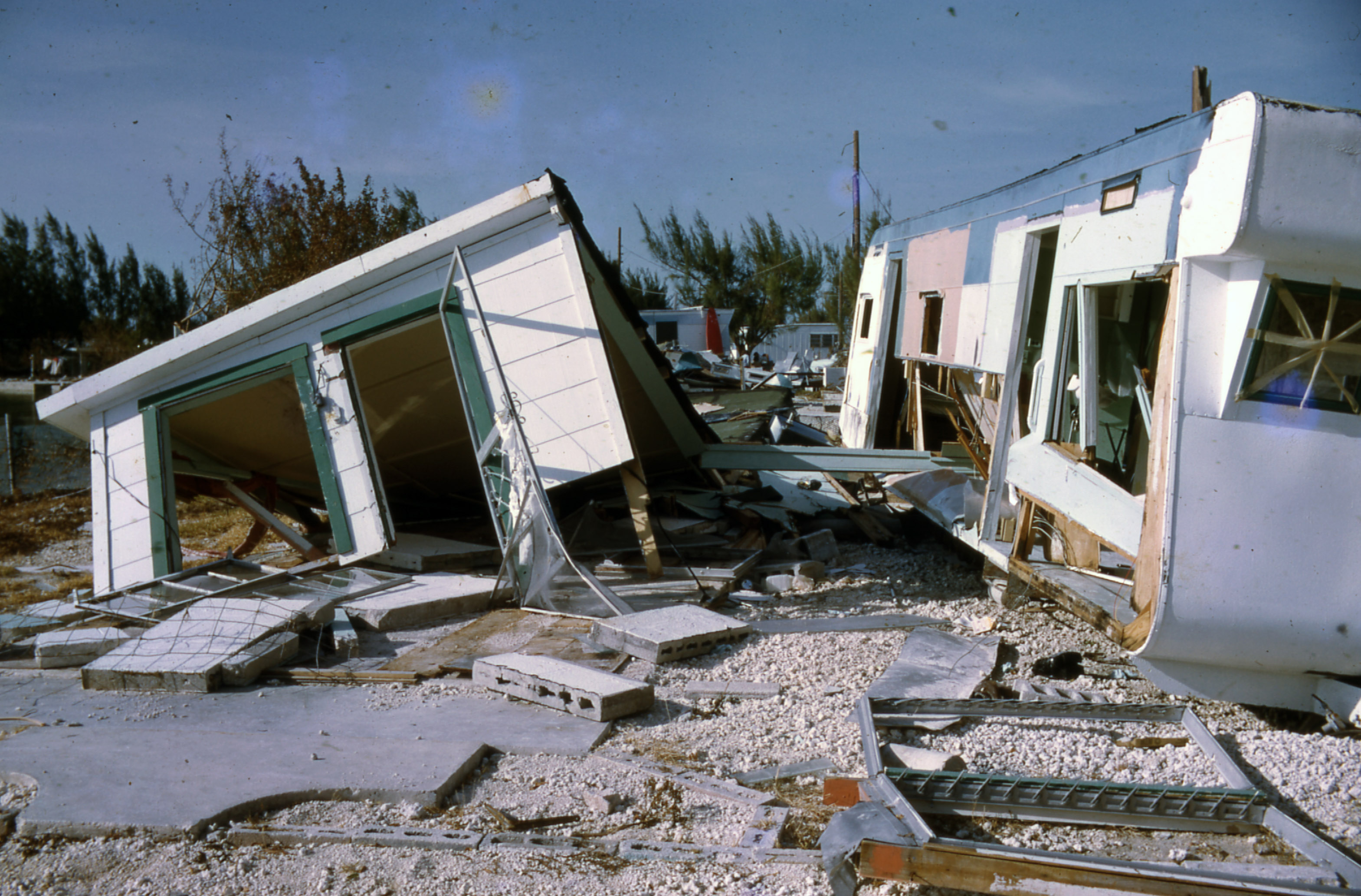
Severe damage to homes in Key West after Hurricane Betsy

Precipitation was localized, albeit heavy, in South Florida. Rainfall peaked at 11.80 in (300 mm) in Plantation Key on September 8. The weather station in Big Pine Key observed the second highest state rainfall total at 10.52 in (267 mm). Elsewhere, rainfall spread as far northward as Tampa Bay. Although intense, the rains helped partially alleviate a concurrent drought in the Everglades. No damage was reported in association with the rainfall. A total of three tornadoes formed in association with Betsy, of which two occurred while the major hurricane was landfalling in South Florida. On September 8, a tornado developed and track near Marathon, while another occurred near Big Pine Key; both tornadoes caused no reported damage. However, a waterspout formed near Fort Walton Beach off the Florida Panhandle the following day and later destroyed a marina with twelve boats. The relatively low number of tornadoes that formed as a result of Betsy was due to the anomalously rapid forward motion that Betsy traveled at during its traverse of the Florida peninsula and the Gulf of Mexico. Overall, five people were killed in the state, and damage totaled $139 million, primarily due to the strong storm surge generated by Betsy.

=== Gulf of Mexico ===
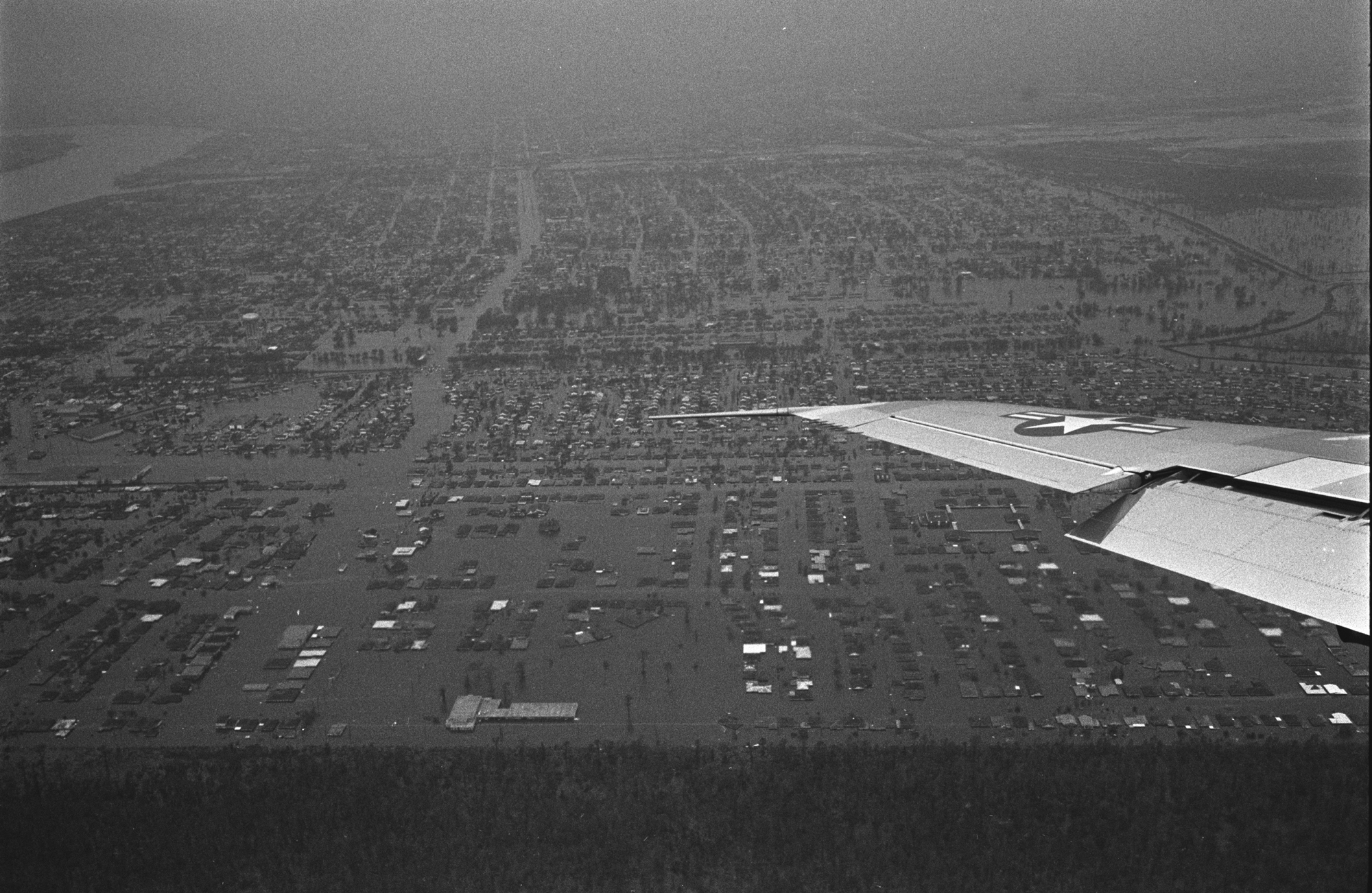
Aerial view of flooding in New Orleans

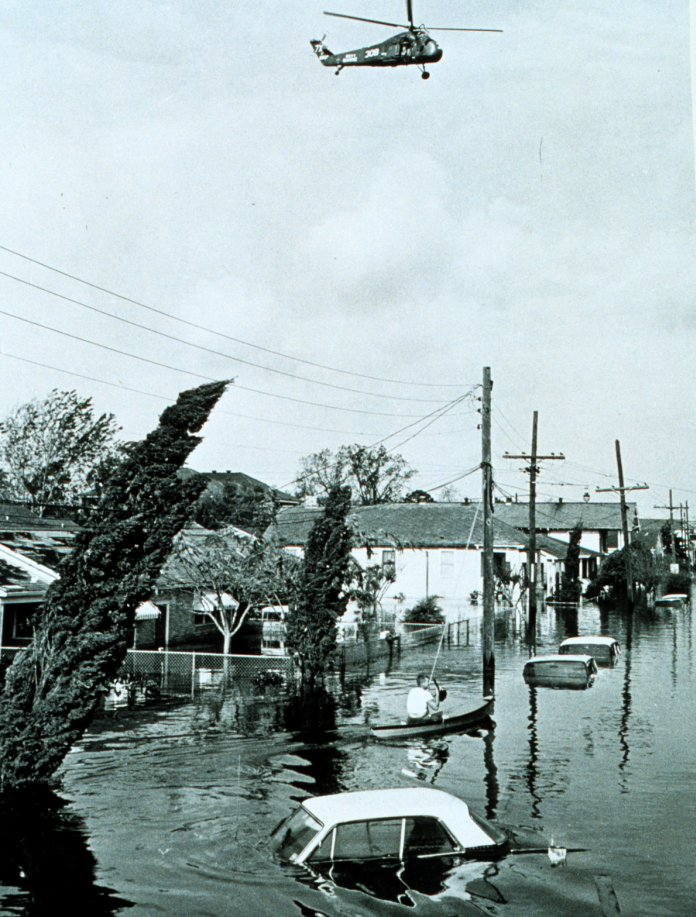
Flooding in the Lower 9th Ward of New Orleans after Betsy

Eight offshore oil platforms were destroyed during Betsy, with others experiencing damage. A Shell oil platform off the Mouth of the Mississippi River was not seen again. The oil rig Maverick, owned by future president George H. W. Bush's Zapata corporation also disappeared during the cyclone. It was insured by Lloyd's of London for US$5.7 million (1965 dollars).

=== Louisiana ===
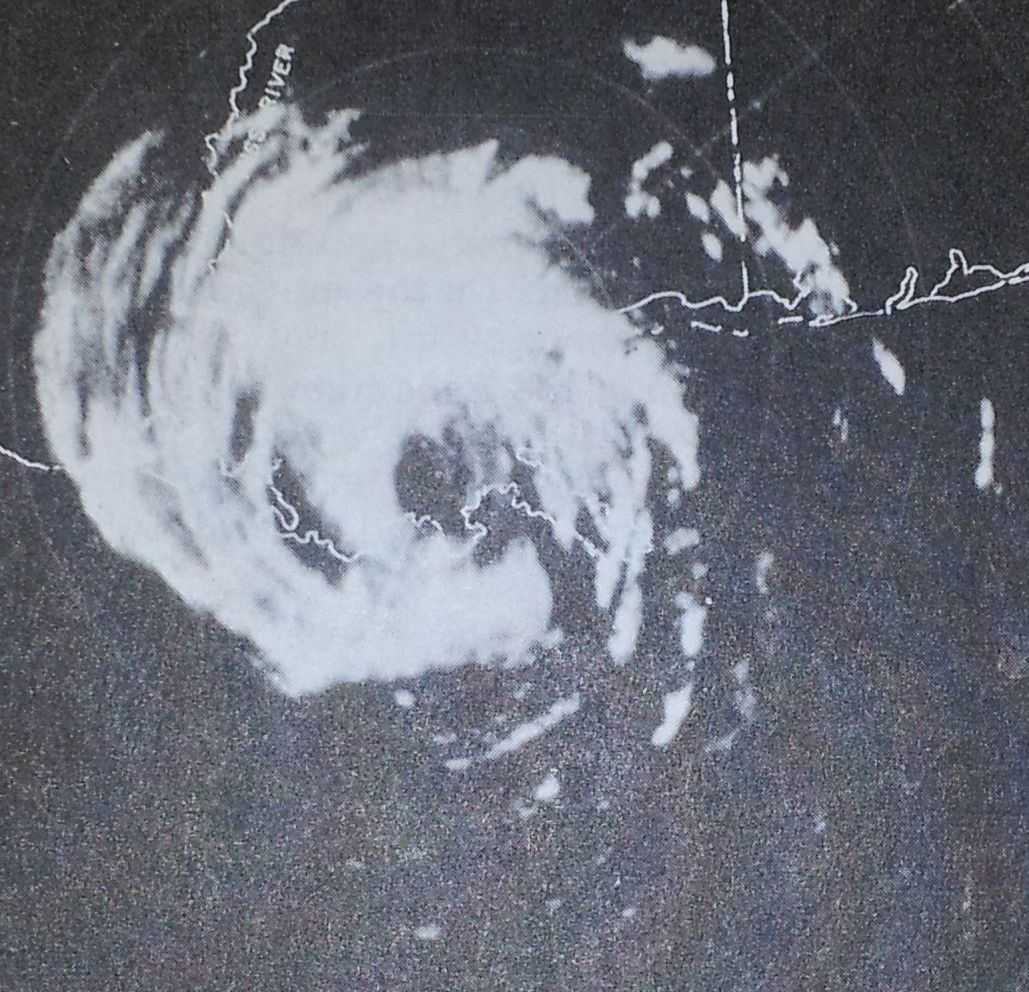
This is the last radar image of Hurricane Betsy, taken by the New Orleans radar on September 10

Hurricane Betsy slammed into Grand Isle on the evening of September 9, 1965. 110 mph (180 km/h) winds and power failures were reported in New Orleans. The eye of the storm passed to the southwest of New Orleans on a northwesterly track. The northern and western eyewalls covered Southeast Louisiana and the New Orleans area from about 8 pm until 4 am the next morning. In Thibodaux winds of 130 mph (210 km/h) to 140 mph (230 km/h) were reported. The Baton Rouge weather bureau operated under auxiliary power, without telephone communication. Around 1 am, the worst of the wind and rain was over.

Betsy also drove a storm surge into Lake Pontchartrain, just north of New Orleans, and the Mississippi River Gulf Outlet, a deep-water shipping channel to the east and south. Levees for the Mississippi River Gulf Outlet along Florida Avenue in the Lower Ninth Ward and on both sides of the Industrial Canal failed. The flood water reached the eaves of houses in some places and over some one story roofs in the Lower Ninth Ward. Some residents drowned in their attics trying to escape the rising waters.

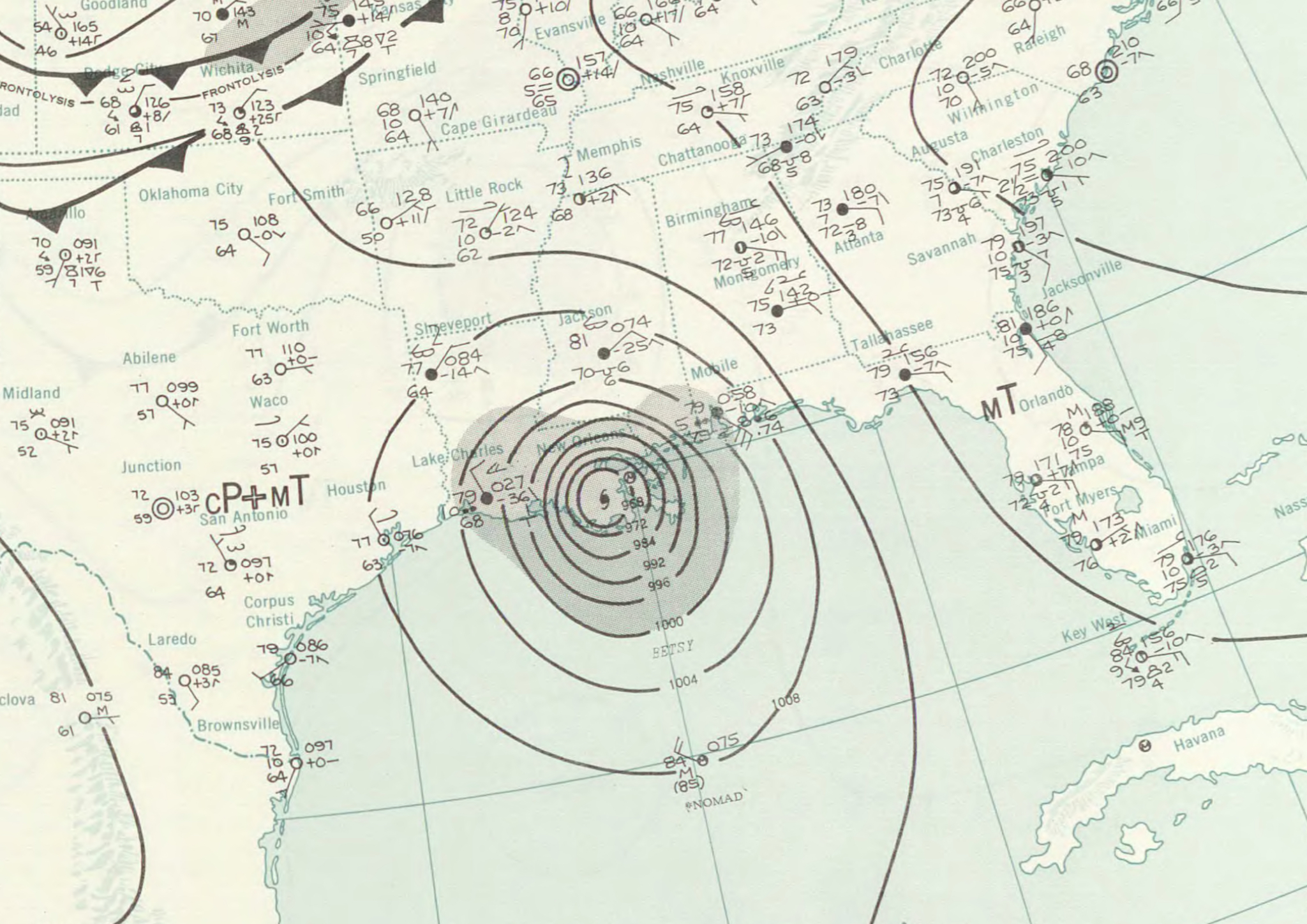
Weather map of Hurricane Betsy shortly after landfall in Southeast Louisiana on September 10

These levee breaches flooded parts of Gentilly, the Upper Ninth Ward, and the Lower Ninth Ward of New Orleans as well as Arabi and Chalmette in neighboring St. Bernard Parish.

On the morning of September 10, 1965, US Senator Russell Long called President Lyndon Johnson pleading for federal aid and for him to visit the city of New Orleans. During the phone call Long suggested that the gesture would help Long, US Representative Edwin Willis, and Johnson himself win re-election. Five hours later, Johnson arrived in the, promising New Orleans Mayor Vic Schiro federal aid.

It was ten days or more before the water level in New Orleans went down enough for people to return to their homes. It took even longer than that to restore their flooded houses to a livable condition. Those who did not have family or friends with dry homes had to sleep in the shelters at night and forage for supplies during the day, while waiting for the federal government to provide emergency relief in the form of trailers. In all, 164,000 homes were flooded at the second landfall.

Evidence suggests that cheap construction and poor maintenance of the structures contributed to the failure of the levees. The French Quarter and Central Business District are situated on the natural levee along the Mississippi River, among the higher ground in New Orleans, and consequently are less vulnerable to flooding than many surrounding areas. Popular rumor nevertheless persists that some levees were intentionally breached, possibly as a means of salvaging the French Quarter and Central Business District. There is no established evidence that the levees were deliberately breached for this purpose.

Many of the barges that had been traveling on the Mississippi River were engulfed by the hurricane. One of the barges, MTC-602, contained 600 tons of deadly chlorine gas contained in cylinders. Chlorine gas, which was used frequently as a chemical weapon in World War I, is a powerful irritant that can inflict damage to the eyes, nose, throat and lungs, and (at high concentrations and prolonged exposure) cause death by asphyxiation. It was estimated that the amount of chlorine loaded on the barge was enough to kill 40,000 people. The barge had sunk near Baton Rouge, where an estimated 300,000 people lived. The residents in the harbor area were evacuated until the barge was recovered. President Lyndon B. Johnson ordered the Navy and Army Engineers to find and raise the barge. While it took months to locate and make the appropriate plans for raising the barge, the actual process of raising it took around two hours. The barge was reportedly recovered, without any problems, on November 12, 1965.

=== Mississippi ===
The storm produced rainfall, high tides, and strong winds in Mississippi. Near the border with Alabama, tides of 7 feet (2.1 m) were reported, while ranging as high as 15 feet (4.6 m) near the state line with Louisiana. Wind speeds also varied greatly throughout the state. In Pascagoula, winds between 40 and 65 mph (64 and 105 km/h) were recorded. By contrast, winds were in excess of 100 mph (160 km/h) in Bay St. Louis. Despite the winds, much of the property damage in the state was caused by tides along the Gulf Coast. Strong winds and heavy rainfall caused significant crop damage in Harrison, Hancock County, Mississippi, and Jackson County, Mississippi. Throughout the state, 25,000 people lost electricity and more than 22,641 disruptions to telephone service occurred. Overall, damage in the state of Mississippi totaled to $80 million (1965 USD).

=== Alabama ===
Though Betsy remained well south and west of Alabama throughout its existence, its outer rainbands and strong storm surge caused damage in some areas of the state, particularly in the southern portions of the state. At the coast, the storm tide caused by Betsy were the highest since 1916. High tides peaking at 4.7 ft (56 in) in Mobile destroyed and damage some private piers and waterfront buildings. The Mobile Bay Causeway and adjacent infrastructure was flooded by the storm surge; as a result the causeway was closed between September 9–10. Strong winds were also reported in southern Alabama. Gusts of 80 mph (130 km/h) were reported on Dauphin Island just off the Alabama coast; these would be the strongest winds or gusts reported statewide. Similarly, gusts of 75 mph (121 km/h) were estimated at Alabama Port. In the former, minor damage was reported to residences and other buildings, and numerous homes sustained minor roof and carport damage. Mobile County reported similar damage. Extensive damage to utility lines in those same regions also occurred. The strong winds also resulted in the tearing of 20–25 percent of the state pecan crop from their trees. Damage to other crops was negligible.

Although rainfall occurred throughout Alabama, precipitation was more numerous in the northern part of the state after Betsy passed the region to the north as a weakening tropical cyclone. Rainfall peaked at 3.39 in (86 mm) in Guntersville. Betsy's outer rainbands also produced two tornadoes in the state. The first occurred in a remote area near Theodore and as such did not cause any damage. However, the second tornado, which touched down near Cullman late on September 11, destroyed several acres of corn and uprooted over 300 fruit trees. The tornado, described as one of "narrow" length, also slightly damaged some buildings and uprooted a number of other trees. Though no exact damage total could be calculated, the tornado caused anywhere between $5,500–$55,000 in damage. Statewide, Hurricane Betsy caused $500,000 in damage.

=== Elsewhere ===
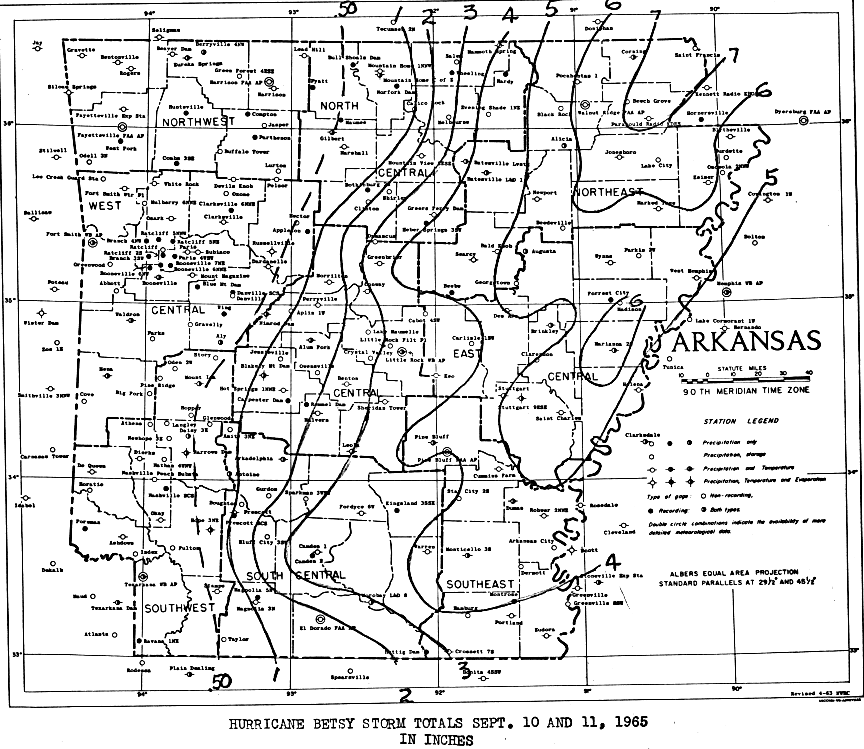
Rainfall totals in Arkansas

In its early formative stages, Betsy forced the shortening of NASA's Gemini 5 mission by one orbit due to the tropical storm's forecasted track over the initial target splashdown zone near Grand Turk Island. As a result, the spacecraft, which had been orbiting the Earth since August 1965, had its target splashdown zone shifted northward to an area of the Atlantic Ocean well east of Jacksonville, Florida, away from the storm's projected path. In Martinique, the precursor tropical depression caused marginal rainfall and light gusts, and no damage was reported. In Sint Maarten, winds and their associated gusts peaked at 35 mph (56 km/h) for several hours on August 28. Throughout the rest of the Windward Islands, gusts peaked at 40 mph (65 km/h), though the resultant wind damage was marginal. As the hurricane was passing near the southeastern Bahamas, high swells were reported along the northern coast of Hispaniola, though no damage ensued.

Although the more significant effects of Hurricane Betsy in the United States were limited to coastal regions, areas further inland received rainfall and strong winds from the weakening tropical cyclone and its remnants, with precipitation extending inland as far northeast as Pennsylvania. Far offset from where Betsy made landfall, effects in Texas were minimal, despite the large scale evacuations in Sabine Pass prior to landfall. In Port Arthur a station received just 0.02 in (0.51 mm) of rain, coupled with storm tides 2.4 ft (0.73 m) above mean sea level. From September 10–11, Betsy passed through Arkansas, which experienced the worst effects in the United States outside of states adjacent to the Gulf of Mexico. The highest reported rainfall total from the hurricane in the state was in Wynne, where 8.02 in (204 mm) of rain was recorded. Surrounding regions in northeastern Arkansas reported at least 6 in (150 mm) of rain. The heavy precipitation and resulting flooding there damaged cotton and rice crops. Much of the rice crop in the eastern and southern portions of the state were flattened by the rains, and thus were highly susceptible to future rainfalls. A third of cotton, much of which defoliated, was lost to the rain. However, these losses were offset by the increased soybean yield resulting from the same rainfall. A number of pecan tree limbs were torn down, though relative to the overall pecan production for the state these losses were negligible. The rains also caused both the Black and White Rivers in the eastern part of the state to rise from 3 ft (0.91 m) to 7 ft (2.1 m); however, they did not exceed flood stage. Betsy's remnants were estimated to have brought winds of 50–70 mph (80–113 km/h) throughout the state. Most of the stronger winds were in the northern quadrant of the weakening tropical cyclone as it progressed through Arkansas. However, the highest measured wind gusts were only clocked at 45 mph (72 km/h) in stations at Pine Bluff and Walnut. The strong winds tore down power lines, leaving hundreds of electricity customers without power for several days. However, regional electrical crews were able to restore most power by the night of September 11. Four people were killed by the weakening hurricane statewide.

In Illinois, the remnants of Hurricane Betsy brought heavy rainfall to the extreme southern portions of the state over a period of three days, ranging anywhere from 3–6 in (76–152 mm); the highest recorded total was 6.25 in (159 mm) in Cairo, Illinois. The same station recorded 6.25 in (159 mm) of rain in a 24-hour period. The resulting damage, if any, was minimal, though minor damage occurred to cotton and soy crops in the Cairo area. Hail and strong winds in Kentucky's Bluegrass region damaged tobacco fields and caused damage to 35 mobile homes and a number of other roofs. Though no deaths were directly associated with Betsy's effects, a car lost control during a rainstorm in Gallatin County and subsequently crashed; the two occupants later went missing and were presumed dead. Strong wind in Montgomery County downed trees. In western Tennessee, moderate to heavy rains in conjunction with gusts as strong as 40 mph (65 km/h) were reported. Precipitation peaked in the state at 6.01 in (153 mm) in Ripley. Though much of the rainfall was beneficial to the region's agricultural sector, localized flooding was also reported. Winds estimated between 25–35 mph (40–56 km/h) blew down some cotton and corn crops. Other opened cotton bolls were damaged, while soybeans were blown down, making mechanical harvesting difficult.

Further north and east, the rains Betsy produced were mostly beneficial as the storm had substantially weakened by the time it had approached these regions. The outer fringes of Betsy caused moderate rainfall in the southeastern states of North Carolina, Georgia, and South Carolina, where state precipitation totals peaked at 3.64 in (92 mm) in Randleman, 3.48 in (88 mm) in Ailey, and 2.21 in (56 mm) in Laurens, respectively. Waves cresting as high as 7 ft (2.1 m) off of South Carolina caused minor beach damage during Betsy's initial approach of the South Atlantic States on September 7. In West Virginia, the rains helped to saturate soils used for growing crops, benefiting crop production. From September 11–13, Betsy's rains were felt throughout Pennsylvania. Rainfall peaked at 1.5 in (38 mm) in the central and northeastern regions of the state. Further south, in Maryland and Delaware, the rains were also beneficial to arable land. Precipitation in the former peaked at 2.55 in (65 mm) in Bittinger, while precipitation in the latter peaked at 1.83 in (46 mm).

== Aftermath ==
The U.S. Army Corps of Engineers' Hurricane Protection Program came into existence as a result of Betsy. The Corps built new levees for New Orleans that were both taller and made of stronger material, designed specifically to resist a fast-moving Category 3 hurricane like Betsy (Betsy was retroactively upgraded to a Category 4 at the time of its Louisiana landfall in 2019). The resulting levee improvements failed when Hurricane Katrina, a large, slow-moving, intense hurricane made landfall near New Orleans on August 29, 2005.

NASA's Michoud Assembly Facility in New Orleans sustained some damage, as did Saturn V test hardware

=== Retirement ===
Due to the storm's extent and severity of impacts, the name Betsy was retired following the season by the National Hurricane Center, and it will not be used again to name a tropical cyclone in the Atlantic basin. Consequently, the name was replaced with Blanche for the 1969 season.

=== Hurricane Betsy in popular culture ===
- In April 1969, Texan blues artist Sam John "Lightnin'" Hopkins wrote the song Hurricane Betsy as the fourth track of the album The Texas Bluesman.
- The song Georgia... Bush was recorded by artists DJ Drama and Lil Wayne and released along with the mixtape Dedication 2 on September 4, 2006. Produced by Vudu Spellz, the song described a first-person account of Hurricane Katrina and emasculated U.S. president George W. Bush, while also indicting institutional racism. Part of the song's lyrics – "Same shit happened back in Hurricane Betsy/ 1965" – makes direct reference to Hurricane Betsy, implying that the government intentionally destroyed levees such that the Lower Ninth Ward would be flooding and thus protecting more expensive lakefront property.
- Written by Rachelle Burk and illustrated by Rex Schneider, the children's novel Tree House in a Storm is a fictional telling of two child siblings whose tree house, having long served as a safe haven, is destroyed by Hurricane Betsy.
- In the television series Flipper, Hurricane Betsy is referenced in the opening of the 10th episode of the second season (S02E10), titled "Dolphin Patrol," which aired on November 19, 1965, approximately two months after the hurricane dissipated. The episode begins with footage of ships in rough seas, accompanied by a narrator describing the storm’s impact: "Hurricane Betsy roared through southern Florida, leaving in her wake a tragic aftermath of destruction. The furious winds, without regard for life or property, tossed boats and automobiles as though they were matchsticks." The narration highlights Florida’s resilience and cleanup efforts before transitioning to the episode’s plot, which involves rescue operations and storm-related challenges at the park.

== See also ==
- List of Florida hurricanes (1950–1974)
- List of Category 4 Atlantic hurricanes
- Hurricane Elena (1985) – Storm of erratic nature struck a wide swath of the United States Gulf Coast as a Category 3 hurricane during the Labor Day week causing major damage
- Hurricane Andrew (1992) – Small tropical cyclone devastated southern Florida as a Category 5 before impacting areas of southeastern Louisiana as a Category 3
- Hurricane Jeanne (2004) – Struck the Bahamas and Florida as a Category 3 hurricane
- Hurricane Katrina (2005) – Category 5 hurricane that struck South Florida as a Category 1 before causing unprecedented destruction in the New Orleans area as a Category 3 hurricane, becoming the costliest hurricane on record
- Hurricane Dorian (2019) – Stalled over The Bahamas as a Category 5 hurricane causing catastrophic damage

== Notes ==
| Preceded by Donna | Costliest Atlantic hurricanes on Record; 1965 | Succeeded by Agnes |
