= Eleuthera =

Island in the Bahamas

Native name: Lutra (Bahamas Creole English) Cigatoo (Taino)
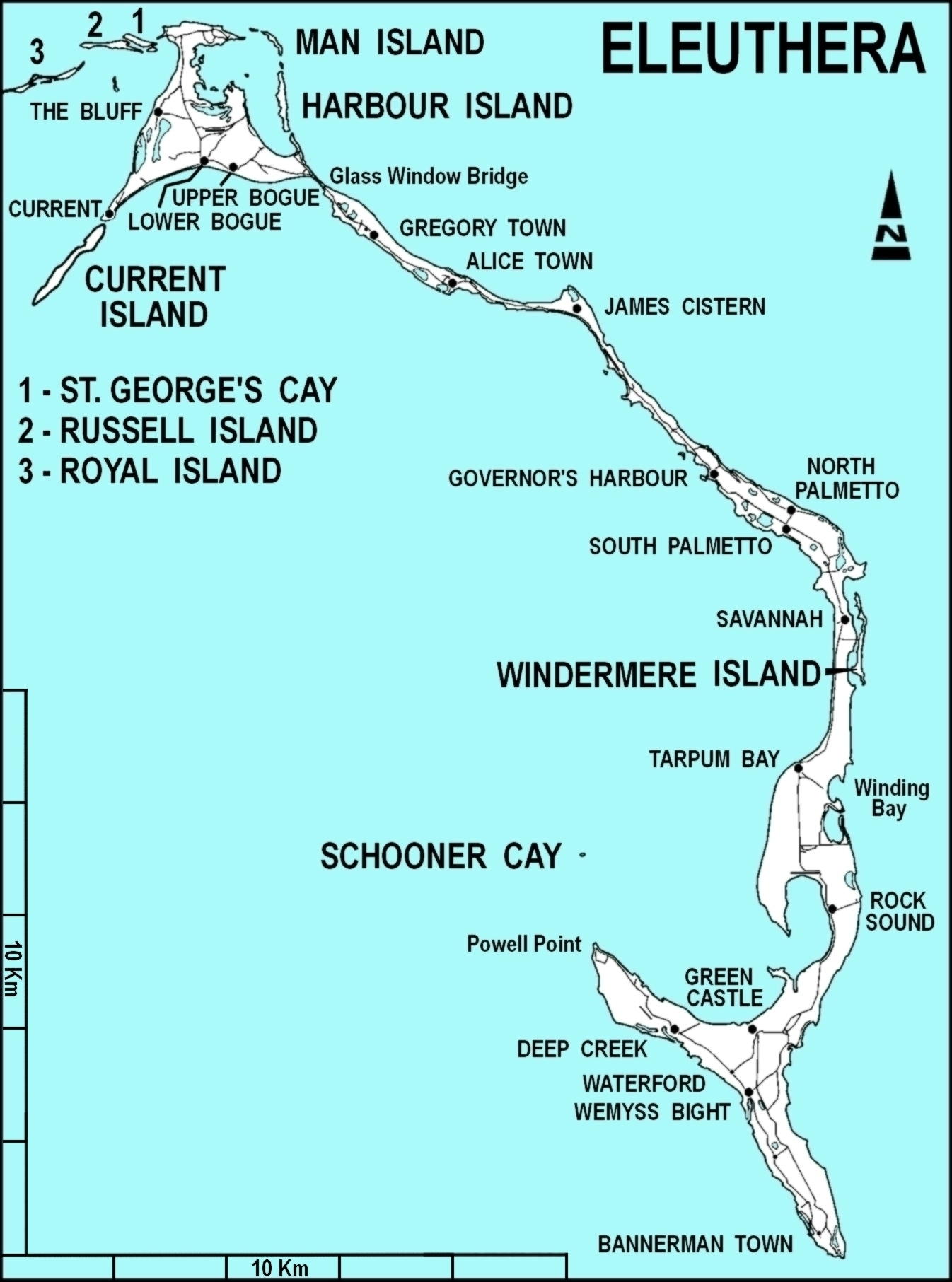
- Map showing the main island of Eleuthera and its associated smaller islands (Russel, Royal, Harbour, and Windermere Islands and associated Cays), other geographical features, and concentrations of population
- Interactive map of Eleuthera

Geography
- Archipelago: Bahamas
- Adjacent to: North Atlantic Ocean
- Major islands: Eleuthera and Harbour Island
- Area: 457.4 km^{2} (176.6 sq mi)
- Length: 180 km (112 mi)
- Width: 1.6 km (0.99 mi)
- Highest elevation: 61 m (200 ft)

Administration
- Bahamas
- Districts: North Eleuthera, Central Eleuthera, South Eleuthera

Demographics
- Population: 12,716 (2022)
- Ethnic groups: 85% African (esp. West African), 12% European, 3% other

Additional information
- Time zone: EST (UTC-5)
  - Summer (DST): EDT (UTC-4)
- ISO code: BS-CE; BS-NE; BS-SE

Eleuthera (/ɪˈljuːθərə/; Taino: Cigatoo), locally known as Lutra (Bahamas Creole English: [ˈluː.trə] LOO-trə), refers both to a single island in the archipelagic state of the Commonwealth of the Bahamas and to its associated group of smaller islands. Eleuthera forms a part of the Great Bahama Bank. The island of Eleuthera incorporates the smaller Harbour Island.

The name "Eleuthera" derives from the feminine form of the Greek adjective ἐλεύθερος (eleútheros), meaning "free". Known in the 17th century as Cigateo, it lies 80 km (50 miles) east of Nassau. It is long and thin—180 km (110 miles) long and in places little more than 1.6 km (1.0 mile) wide. At its narrowest point, the Glass Window Bridge, which has been called the narrowest place on earth, Eleuthera stands 30 feet wide. Its eastern side faces the Atlantic Ocean and its western side faces the Great Bahama Bank. The topography of the island varies from wide rolling pink sand beaches to large outcrops of ancient coral reefs and the highest elevation point is 200 feet (61 m). The population is approximately 11,000 and the principal economy of the island is tourism.

== Geography and wildlife ==
The name Eleuthera refers both to the single Bahamian island and its associated chain of small islands, which include Harbour Island, Windermere Island, Man Island, and Current Island. Eleuthera forms part of the Great Bahama Bank on its western edge and its eastern coastline faces the Atlantic Ocean. The main island lies 80 km (50 miles) east of Nassau. It is a long and thin island; 180 km (110 miles) long and little more than 1.6 km (1.0 mile) wide at its narrowest. The island has an estimated area of 457.4 square-kilometers, and presents 336 km (210 miles) of coastline.

The topography of the island varies, including wide rolling pink sand beaches, large outcrops of ancient coral reefs, caves, and other geological features. The island features, among other flora and fauna, 13 catalogued species of native amphibian and reptile species, three of which were listed as endangered in 2000. The main island is home to a 25-acre nature preserve; the Leon Levy Native Plant Reserve, which includes an environmental education centre. The waters around Eleuthera contain an abundance of sharks and rays, which is attributed by the local Cape Eleuthera Institute to the banning of long-line fishing in local waters.

== History ==
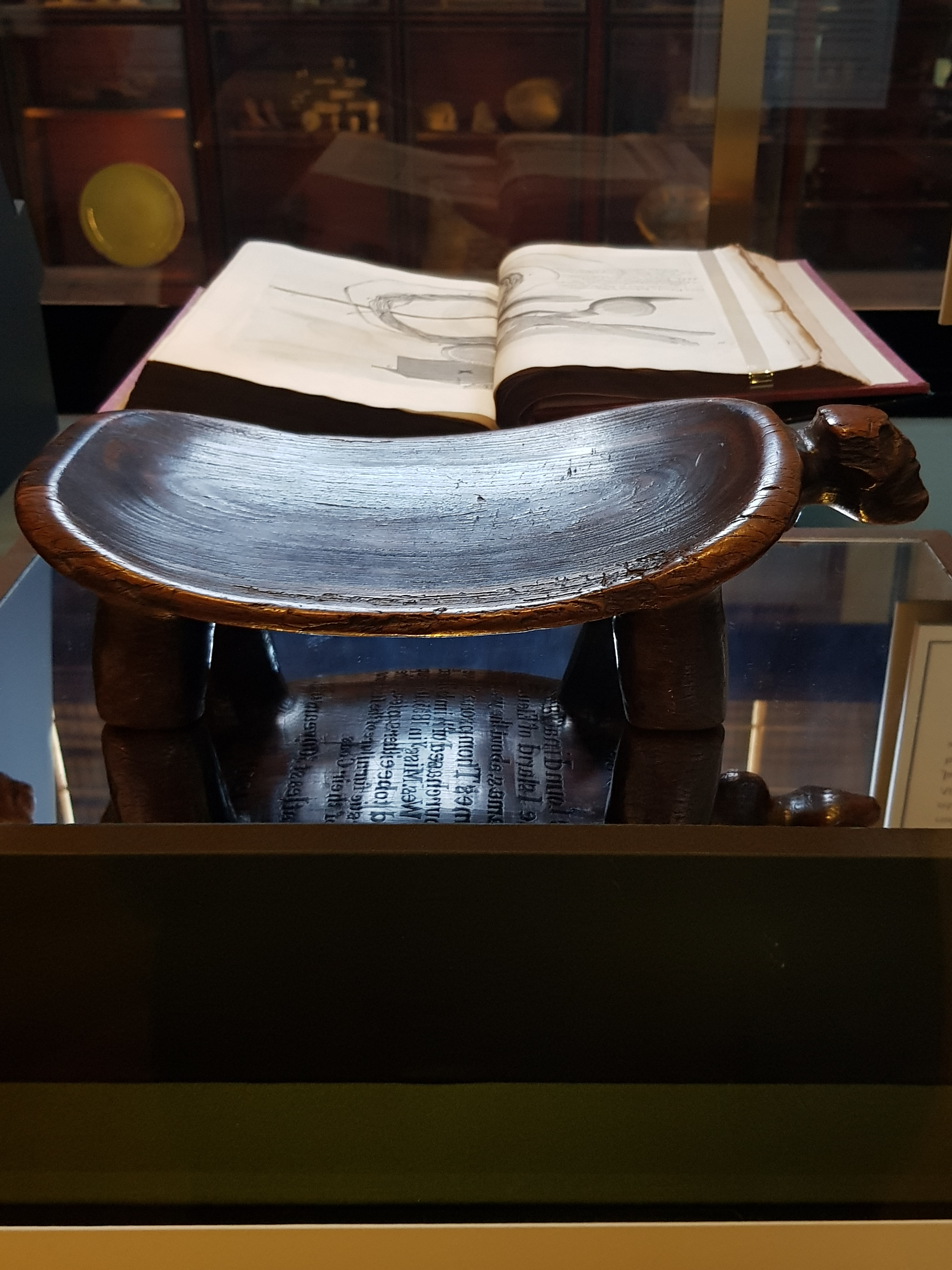
The Eleuthera duho in the British Museum

The possible first settlers of the island were the original population of Taínos or Arawaks. An intact wooden duho or ritual seat that was made by the Lucayan people was found on the island of Eleuthera in the nineteenth century and is now in the collections of the British Museum. The island in its early history was known as Cigateo (also spelt Ciguateo or Zigateo), meaning "distant rocky land", but this name changed following subsequent European settlement. Others suggest the name Cigateo came from the Taíno (or specifically Lucayan) word cigua meaning "sea snail", with the island's Taíno name being gazetted as Cigatoo.

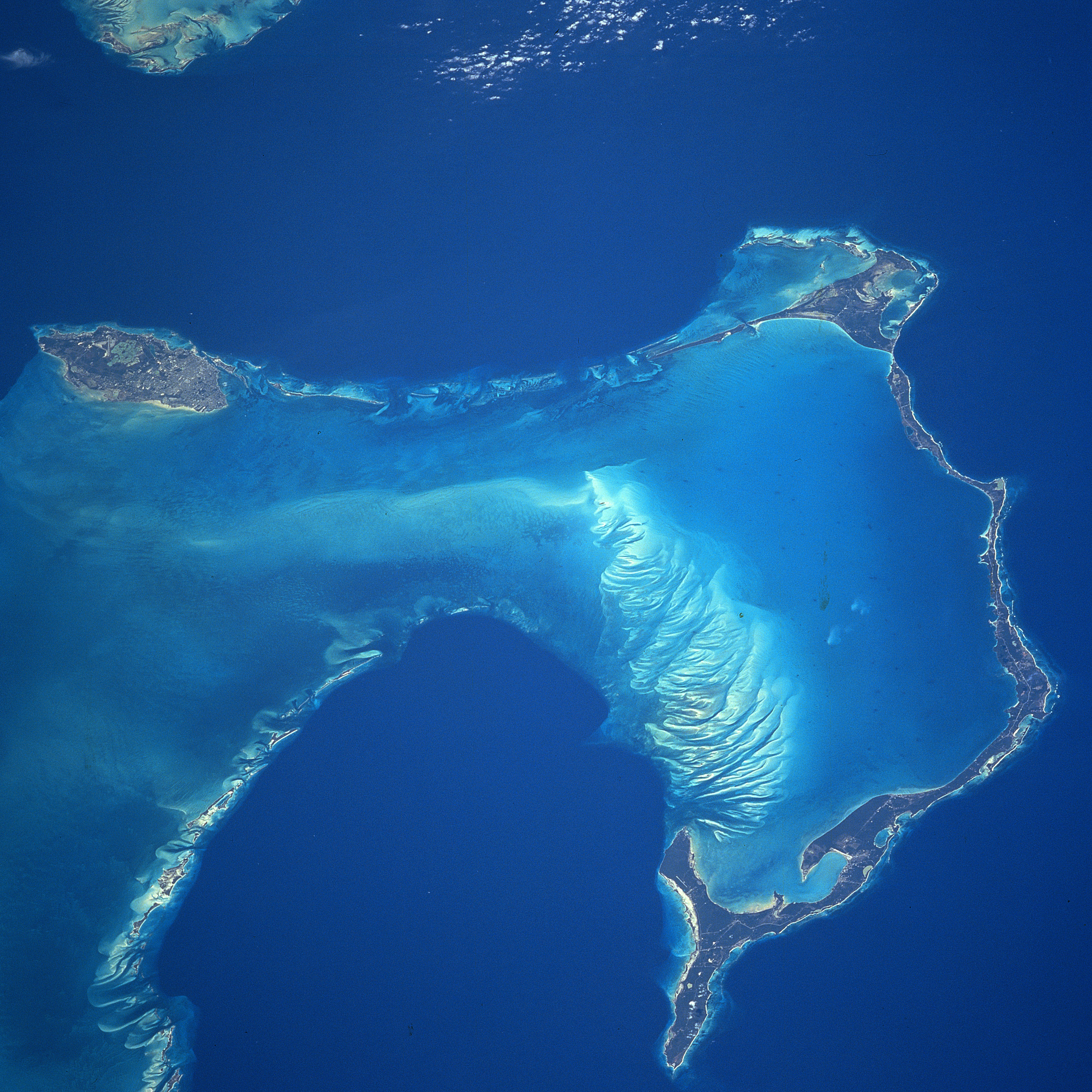
NASA satellite image, showing New Providence Island to the west, and east of it, the long, narrow island of Eleuthera running north and south (along with its associated Harbour and other small islands), as seen from space in 1997

The island is believed to have been largely unoccupied at the time of the arrival of the first significant number of British settlers, with Puritan colonists (who had come together the previous year in London) arriving in 1648 from Bermuda. These settlers, known as the "Eleutherian Adventurers", under Captain William Sayle gave the island its current name which derives from the feminine form of the Greek adjective ἐλεύθερος, eleutheros, meaning "free". The difficulties of settlement ultimately left only a few of the settlers on the island, thwarting their aim of creating the first European "democracy" in the Western Hemisphere (almost 130 years prior to the American Revolution).

The island was stated to have been agriculturally prosperous in the period from 1950 to 1980. This included a large crop of pineapples for export. When the Bahamas became independent from Britain in 1973, new ownership laws changed the nature of the island economy. Since then the island has become a popular tourist destination.

In 1992 the island was severely damaged by the category 5 Hurricane Andrew; massive wind speeds hit the island and an 18-foot tidal surge inundated the coastal area. Relief efforts helped mitigate some of the damage, including several relief tasks that were carried out by HMS Cardiff as the vessel was operating in the area.

In early March 2019, Disney Cruise Line purchased the Lighthouse Point property on the island of Eleuthera and agreed to a development plan for the area with the Bahamian government. Disney spent between $250 million and $400 million on developing the 700-acre property and donated 190 acres – including the southernmost tip – to the government for a national park. Lighthouse Point opened exclusively to Disney Cruise Line guests on June 6, 2024.

== Demography ==
According to the Government of the Bahamas, the population of Eleuthera was 7,999 in 2000 and 8,202 in 2010, spread across 2,718 households. The population density in 2010 was 57.6 persons per square mile. As of 2017, the island’s population was estimated at approximately 11,000. According to the Bahamas Department of Statistics, the 2022 census recorded a population of approximately 9,104 on Eleuthera Island, with additional populations on Harbour Island and Spanish Wells.

The 2022 census also provided a breakdown of Eleuthera’s population by administrative district:

- North Eleuthera: 3,893
- Central Eleuthera: 3,287
- South Eleuthera: 1,924
- Harbour Island: 1,861
- Spanish Wells: 1,608

== Economy and settlements ==
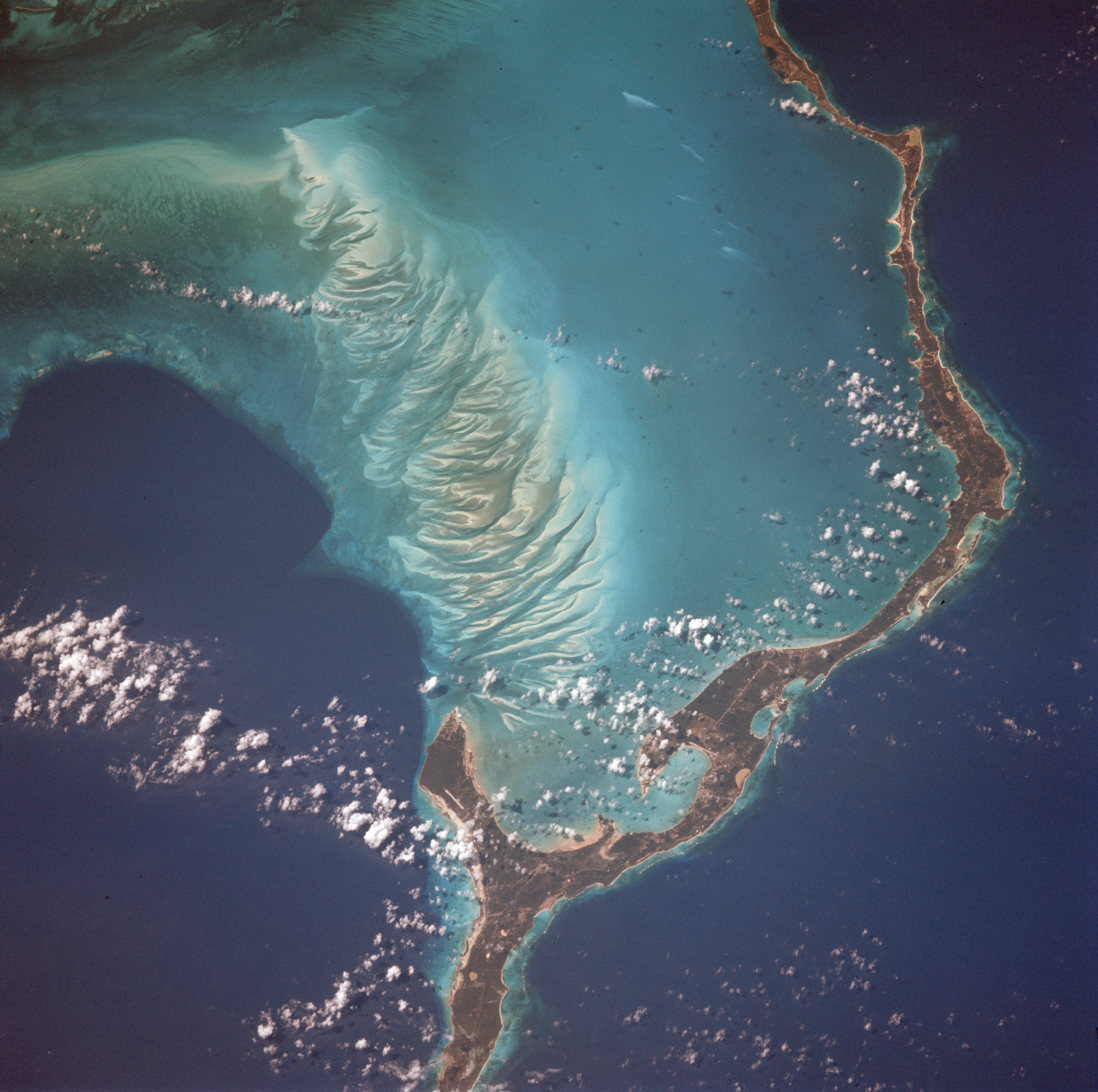
Eleuthera Island is one of several within the archipelago surrounded by shallow seas, visible here as light blue. Mosaic patterns of sand waves built by sea bottom currents in the shallows stand out in stark contrast to the deep blue of the ocean depths of a thousand feet in the Exuma Sound.

Settlements on the island include (north to south) the Bluff, Upper and Lower Bogue, Current, Gregory Town, Alice Town, James Cistern, Governor's Harbour, North and South Palmetto Point, Savannah Sound, Winding Bay, Tarpum Bay, Rock Sound, Greencastle, Deep Creek, Delancy Town, Waterford, Wemyss Bight, John Millars, Millar's and Bannerman Town.

The largest of the settlements are Governor's Harbour (the administrative capital), Rock Sound, Tarpum Bay, Harbour Island with its unusual pink sandy beaches and Spanish Wells. The largest settlements in terms of population in Eleuthera are Dunmore Town, Spanish Wells and Rock Sound.

There is an annual Pineapple Festival in Gregory Town. Eleuthera is a destination for those interested in Bahamian history and nature, and neighbouring Harbour Island and Spanish Wells offer further tourism experiences. Natural attractions include the Glass Window Bridge, Hatchet Bay caves, and Surfer's Beach in the north, and Ocean Hole and Lighthouse Beach at the south end. Preacher's Cave on the north end was home to the Eleutherian Adventurers in the mid-17th century, and recent excavations have uncovered Arawak remains at the site. As of 2000, per capita GDP for the island was: $5756 Bahamian, with a chief human economic activity being tourism, and 6% of the population being involved in fishing, agriculture, or mining.

== Education ==
There are 12 primary schools (grades 1–6) on Eleuthera; Deep Creek Primary, Emma E. Cooper Primary, Governor's Harbour Primary, Green Castle Primary, Gregory Town Primary, James Cistern Primary, Current Island Primary, North Eleuthera Primary, P.A. Gibson Primary, Rock Sound Primary, Tarpum Bay Primary, and Wemyss Bight Primary schools.

There are three public high schools (grades 7–12) on Eleuthera: North Eleuthera High in Lower Bogue, Central Eleuthera High in North Palmetto Point, and Preston Albury High in Rock Sound.

The Island School is a private secondary school in Eleuthera. The Deep Creek Middle School is an independent school on Eleuthera for grades seven to nine. The Cape Eleuthera Institute is a research and summer education institute on the main island. The Haynes Public library is located in Governors Harbour in a historical building constructed in 1897; it is the oldest Government Complex on the island.

== Transport ==
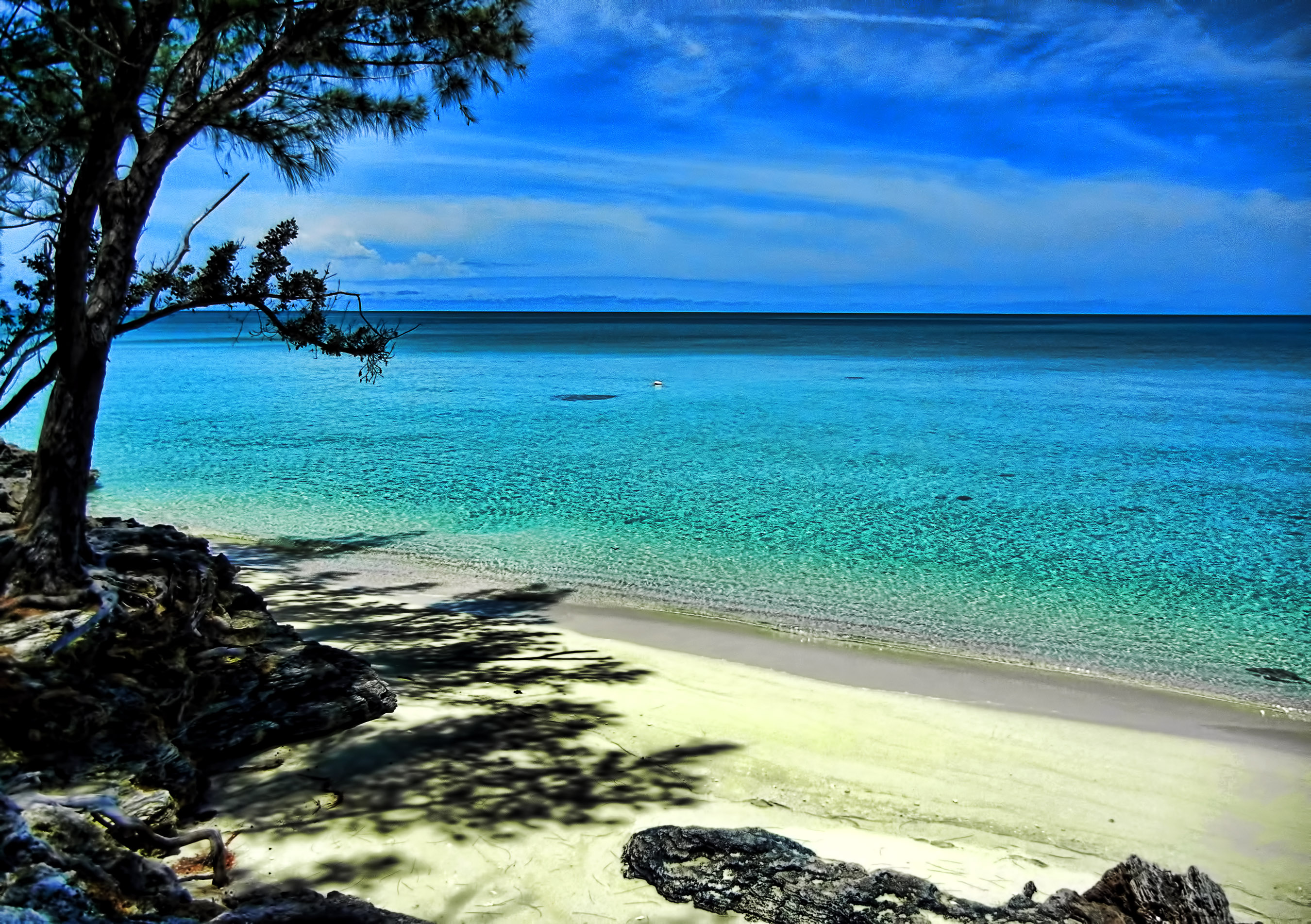
Beach scene at Current Island, Eleuthera

The island is reached by sea and by air links from the rest of The Bahamas. Three airports serve the island. North Eleuthera Airport, with a 1,835-metre (6,020 ft) runway on the north part of the island and located inland. Governor's Harbour Airport is located in the middle of the main island and has services to Nassau. Rock Sound Airport is an airport in the South Eleuthera district of the Bahamas. Its name comes from the former district of Rock Sound.

The main island has one principal road, the Queens Highway, which runs the length of the island. The road runs for a total length of 177 kilometres (110 mi). In 2009, US$13 million was given by the Bahamas government for roadworks of 97 kilometres (60 mi).

Ports and marinas open for traffic on Eleuthera include Governor's Harbour, Current Island, Harbour Island & North Eleuthera, Rock Sound, and Spanish Wells. In 2011 several improvements were carried out to the docks at Current Island to improve access for vehicular traffic, including replacement of the wooden jetty.

In 2021, the Minister of Works Desmond Bannister announced plans for a $30 million upgrade for the Glass Window Bridge. The new bridge will be constructed 18 m (60 feet) west of the existing bridge.

== U.S. military bases ==
=== NAVFAC Eleuthera ===
25°16′11″N 76°18′53″W

The United States Naval Facility (NAVFAC) Eleuthera, Bahamas was a shore terminus and processing facility for the Sound Surveillance System (SOSUS) operated by the U.S. Navy to detect submarines. In 1951 a six-element test array had been placed offshore to demonstrate the system's capability to detect submarines. After successful tests with a U.S. submarine, a functional forty-element array was installed in 1952 as one of a total of nine Atlantic systems ordered. Though it was the first array to be installed, it was last to get the operational shore terminal under Navy command when NAVFAC Eleuthera was commissioned on 1 September 1957. The facility had a complement of 150 officers and enlisted men, a resident Western Electric engineer, some nineteen Pan-American Airway and RCA contractors, and 45 Bahamian employees who supported the facility. NAVFAC Eleuthera was decommissioned on 31 March 1980 after 23 years of service. It was located near Governor's Harbour Airport. The first U.S. Navy women to be assigned to a SOSUS facility were the eleven assigned to NAVFAC Eleuthera in 1972. Seventeen years earlier the Canadian contingent of the joint U.S./Canadian Forces SOSUS facility, Canadian Forces Station (CFS) Shelburne, included five women of the Women's Royal Canadian Naval Service.

Adjacent to the NAVFAC was the original site of the first experimental array and electronics, operated by two Western Electric engineers and a few military personnel, which continued in service as an avenue for experiments.

=== Eleuthera AAFB ===
The U.S. Air Force Eastern Test Range (ETR) Range Tracking Station No. 4 was sited at Eleuthera AAFB (ELU AUXILIARY AIR FORCE BASE), supported by contractor employees of the Radio Corporation of America (RCA) and Pan American Airways (PAA) in the 1960s and 1970s. This was used by the MISTRAM system.

== In popular culture ==
The island inspired a song named "Eleutheria" (freedom) by Lenny Kravitz in 1993. Kravitz is a resident of the island and has stated many of his songs were written while on the island.
