= Savannah Sound =

- Settlement
- The location of Savannah Sound within the Bahamas
- Coordinates: 25.0867°N 76.1283°W
- Country: Bahamas
- Island: Grand Bahama
- District: South Eleuthera

Population (2010)
  - Total: 204
- Time zone: UTC-5 (EST)
  - Summer (DST): UTC-4 (EDT)
- Area code: 242
- ISO 3166 code: BS-CE

Savannah Sound is a settlement of 204 people (as of 2010) in Central Eleuthera, the Bahamas. It is located on Windermere Island. Its chapel was built in 1809. Its high school is called Windermere.
