= Ben Falk (permaculturalist) =

- Education: University of Vermont (BA); Conway School of Landscape Design (MA)

Ben Falk is an American permaculturalist, landscape architect, homesteader, and author.

Based in Vermont, Falk owns Whole Systems Design, a site design and land planning firm in Moretown. The firm has conducted landscape planning for the Island School in the Bahamas, and the Hotchkiss School in Connecticut. Falk has pioneered the cultivation of rice in cold climate agricultural settings.

== Works ==
- The Resilient Farm and Homestead: An Innovative Permaculture and Whole Systems Design Approach (2013)

Winner of the American Horticultural Society 2014 Book Award https://ahsgardening.org/wp-content/uploads/2022/03/Chronological-list-of-award-winners.pdf

- The Resilient Farm and Homestead, Revised and Expanded Edition: 20 Years of Permaculture and Whole Systems Design (2024)
