= Windermere Island =

Island in the Bahamas

- Windermere Beach

- Location within Bahamas

Geography
- Location: Atlantic Ocean
- Coordinates: 25°04′N 76°06′W
- Archipelago: Lucayan Archipelago

Administration
- Bahamas

Additional information
- Time zone: EST (UTC-5)
  - Summer (DST): EDT (UTC-4)
- ISO code: BS-CE

Windermere Sign From Queens Highway, Eleuthera

Windermere Island is a small island in The Bahamas, off the coast of Eleuthera. The two islands are connected by a bridge.

The island is approximately 5.5 miles (8.9 kilometers) long. The bridge was built by Lord Trefgarne, who was the former owner of the island.

The adjoining waters and flats of Savannah Sound are a popular bonefishing location, and Windermere's 5-mile-long beach is protected by a 5-mile-long (8 kilometers) reef that is rich in fish and underwater flora. It is also located in the same bay as Camp Bahamas. There are numerous animals around the island, including sand crabs and whale sharks.

== Residents ==
The island is populated with private homes and holiday rental properties. Diana, Princess of Wales, and Charles III spent their 1981 honeymoon on the island. Famous residents have included: Jacques-Yves Cousteau; the 5th Duke of Abercorn and his late wife Sacha, Duchess of Abercorn; Toni Braxton; India Hicks; and the family of Lyndon B. Johnson.

In April 2008, singer-songwriter Mariah Carey and comedian Nick Cannon were married at Carey’s private residence on the island.

== Geography ==
Windermere Island is adjacent to the larger island of Eleuthera, and the two islands are connected by a bridge. The Windermere island offers white sandy beaches, bright blue waters, and naturally planted Arecaceae trees.

The island is approximately 5.5 miles (8.9 kilometers) long and 1.5 miles (2.4 kilometers) wide, with a total area of about 5 square miles (8 km^{2}).

Windermere Island is home to a number of different ecosystems, including pine forests, mangrove swamps, and sand dunes. The island is also surrounded by coral reefs, which provide important habitats for a variety of marine life, and provide countless ecosystem services.

The island's climate is tropical, with warm temperatures year-round and a rainy season from May to October. The vegetation on the island is adapted to these conditions, with species such as coconut palms, sea grapes, and bougainvillea thriving in the warm, humid environment.
