= Exuma Sound =

Body of water in the Bahama Islands

- Location within Bahamas Location within the Caribbean
- Coordinates: 24°15′00″N 76°00′00″W
- Primary inflows: Atlantic Ocean
- Basin countries: Bahamas
- Max. depth: 6,699 ft (2,042 m)

Exuma Sound is a body of water in the Bahama Islands. It lies southeast of New Providence Island and Eleuthera Island and west of Cat Island.

The first ever landing of a rocket in a different country than it was launched from occurred on February 18th, 2025, when a SpaceX Falcon 9 launched from Space Launch Complex 40 (SLC-40) at Cape Canaveral Space Force Station in Florida landed on a drone ship in Exuma Sound as a part of the Starlink 10-12 mission.
