= Central and South Eleuthera =

Bahamas parliamentary constituency

- Constituency
- Central and South Eleuthera in the 2021 election
- District: Central Eleuthera, South Eleuthera

Current constituency
- Seats: 1
- Party: Progressive Liberal Party
- Member: Clay Sweeting

Central and South Eleuthera is a parliamentary constituency represented in the House of Assembly of the Bahamas. It elects one member of parliament (MP) using the First past the post electoral system. It has been represented by Clay Sweeting from the Progressive Liberal Party since 2021.

== Geography ==
The constituency comprises the districts of Central Eleuthera and South Eleuthera.

== Demographics ==
2915 registered voters in 2021.

== Members of Parliament ==
Election	Parliament	Candidate	Party
2002		Oswald Ingraham	Progressive Liberal Party
2007		Oswald Ingraham	Progressive Liberal Party
2012		Damian Gomez	Progressive Liberal Party
2017		Stephen Hank Johnson	Free National Movement
2021	14th Bahamian Parliament	Clay Sweeting	Progressive Liberal Party
2026	15th Bahamian Parliament	Clay Sweeting	Progressive Liberal Party

== Election results ==
2021
Party	Candidate	Votes	%	±%
PLP	Clay Sweeting	1,638	58.52	
FNM	Hank Johnson (incumbent)	1,062	37.94	
United Coalition Movement	Cassius Stuart	88	3.14	
Grand Commonwealth Party	Alphonso Albury	11	0.39	
Turnout		2,799	71.70	
PLP gain from FNM				

== See also ==
- Constituencies of the Bahamas
