= Governor's Harbour =

- The location of Governor's Harbour within the Bahamas
- Coordinates: 25°11′41″N 76°14′38″W

Population (2010)
  - Total: 701
- Time zone: UTC-5 (EST)
  - Summer (DST): UTC-4 (EDT)
- ISO 3166 code: BS-CE
- Website: governorsharbour.org

Governor's Harbour is a principal settlement and administrative centre in Eleuthera in The Bahamas. It corresponds roughly to the centre of the former district of Central Eleuthera. Established by William Sayle and the Eleutherian Adventurers in 1648, it lays claim to being the beginning of the post-Lucayan Bahamas.

The settlement is served by Governor's Harbour Airport.
