= Clay Sweeting =

Bahamian politician

Member of the Parliament of the Bahamas for Central and South Eleuthera
- Incumbent
- Assumed office 2021

Personal details
- Party: Progressive Liberal Party

Clay Glennford Sweeting (born 21 December 1985) is a Bahamian politician from the Progressive Liberal Party currently serving as MP for Central and South Eleuthera.

== Early life ==
Sweeting was born in Spanish Wells, Eleuthera. He attended Spanish Wells All Age School and went on to graduate from Teesside University.

== Political career ==
On 20 September 2021 he was appointed Minister of Agriculture and Marine Resources. In 2024, in a cabinet shuffle, his cabinet portfolio was changed to Minister of Works and Family Island Affairs.

== See also ==
- 14th Bahamian Parliament
