= Tarpum Bay =

Tarpum Bay Glenelg
- The location of Tarpum Bay within the Bahamas
- Coordinates: 24°59′N 76°10′W
- Country: The Bahamas
- Island: Eleuthera
- District: South Eleuthera

Population (2010)
  - Total: 766
- Time zone: UTC-5 (EST)
  - Summer (DST): UTC-4 (EDT)

Tarpum Bay is one of the larger settlements on the island of Eleuthera in the Bahamas. As of the 2010 census, Tarpum Bay had a population of 766. Initially named Glenelg after a British Secretary of State for War and the Colonies, the settlement's name was changed to Tarpum Bay to reflect the tarpon fish that could be found there. Tarpum Bay is known for its vibrantly colored buildings and large waterside Anglican church. Local fishermen sell their catch daily at one of the two fishing docks.
