= Rock Sound, Bahamas =

Town in the Bahamas

Rock Sound
- The location of Rock Sound within the Bahamas
- Coordinates: 24.8642°N 76.1587°W

Population (2010)
  - Total: 961
- Time zone: UTC-5 (EST)
  - Summer (DST): UTC-4 (EDT)
- ISO 3166 code: BS-SE

Rock Sound is a town and former district of the Bahamas. It corresponds roughly to the current district of South Eleuthera. At the 2010 census, the population was 961. As of 2012 it had a population of 1,075.

The town is served by Rock Sound International Airport.
