= Island School (Bahamas) =

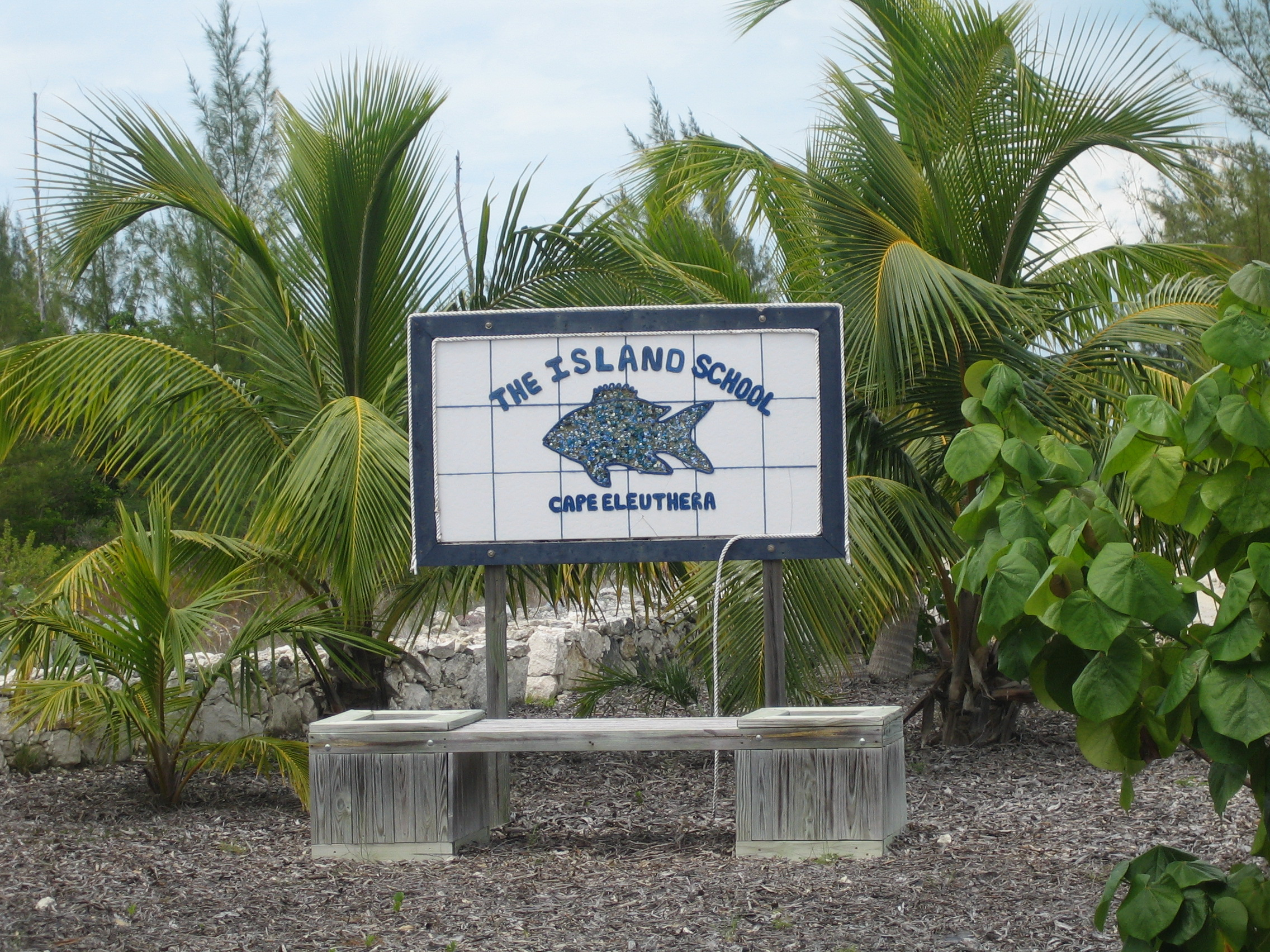
- Island School Entrance

Location
- Cape Eleuthera; Bahamas
- Coordinates: 24°50′00″N 76°20′00″W

Information
- Type: Semester School, Experiential, Coeducational
- Motto: Leadership affecting change.
- Established: 1999
- Founder: Chris and Pam Maxey
- Faculty: 25
- Grades: 10 and 11
- Enrollment: 52 per semester
- Campus: Island
- Mascot: Mutton Snapper
- Website: www.islandschool.org

The Island School is a high school for 7th graders to 12 graders located in The Bahamas. It is one mile (1.6 km) from Powell Point, near the south-westernmost tip of Eleuthera, Bahamas.

== Semester programs ==
The Island School offers two '14-week' semester programs each year and a 6-week summer term. The fall semester begins in late August and runs through early December, and the spring semester starts in late January and ends in the beginning of May. Summer term runs from "late June to early August".

Fall and spring semester program students complete a study course within seven classes, including Home, Marine Ecology, Applied Scientific Research, Creative Writing and Storytelling, Community and Culture, Sustainable Systems, and Art and Movement Art. Students also participate in weekly Community Outreach classes with the Deep Creek Middle School. Summer programs focus on Applied Scientific Research and Human Ecology.

== History ==
The Island School was founded in 1999 by Chris and Pam Maxey, with support from the Lawrenceville School in New Jersey. Chris Maxey taught at the school, and in 1996 he received the Joukowsky Fellowship award allowing him to work towards his master's in Marine Resource Management at the Rosenstiel School of Marine, Atmospheric, and Earth Science at the University of Miami, which is located in Florida, United States. He initiated the Cape Eleuthera Marine Conservation Project, now the Cape Eleuthera Foundation, and began to set the framework to build a school and research station at Cape Eleuthera in The Bahamas. The project received a donation of 18 acres (7.3 ha) of land donated by the Cape Eleuthera Resort & Yacht Club. Construction on the campus began in the fall of 1998. On March 15, 1999, Pam and Chris started the first 14-week, one-hundred-day Island School semester, which included 22 students and 6 faculty members.

== Facilities ==
What began as a three-building campus is now a diverse system of interconnected facilities. The current campus comprises a faculty office and school store, two large dormitory buildings, four main classrooms, a boathouse, a dining hall with outside patio seating, a student life and medical center, two two-story faculty apartment buildings, two open-air gazebos, a living-roof multi-use building, a farm and orchard, a bio-diesel production facility, wood shop, a resource processing center, and in addition, the adjacent campus which hosts the Cape Eleuthera Institute.

=== Ecological design ===
The 10-acre (4-hectare) campus is powered by systems that allow the school to reduce its ecological impact. Rainwater from the roofs is captured for use and collected into a system of cisterns with 82,000 U.S. gallons (310,000 liters) storage capacity. Water is heated through solar thermal collectors. Buildings are designed and constructed from local materials where possible and without air-conditioning. Furniture for the school is hand-crafted on campus out of Casuarina, a local invasive tree species. The school generates most of its electricity through its 29 kW photovoltaic array and 10 kW wind turbine mounted on a 100 ft (30 m) tower above campus. The school seeks to transform its waste outputs through its constructed wetland which captures nutrients and filters wastewater before it's used to irrigate landscaping. The school seeks to revolutionize its waste processing through the adaptation of its newly constructed bio-digester which will convert human waste into usable energy. In 2003, a student research group pioneered the biodiesel program, which annually transforms 18.000 gallons of waste cooking oil collected from local restaurants and cruise ships. The biodiesel powers Island School's fleet of 9 boats and 11 vehicles as well as its backup generators. The school's permaculture, aquaculture, and aquaponics programs seek to reduce the amount of food imported annually. The school also invests in local agriculture by partnering with farmers to provide locally sourced fruits, vegetables, and meats.

== Outdoor programs ==
Students undergo PADI Open Water Scuba Certification so that the ocean can become their classroom. They learn about marine ecology concepts and then interact with knowledge by observing the marine world directly by experiencing it. Marine Ecology classes take place primarily in the ocean, with students diving to study these ecological concepts. Students may also be required to dive as part of their coursework in Research classes.

All students participate in two expeditions during the semester. The initial three-day kayak trip teaches basic skills of ocean kayaking, camping, and team building and serves as an introduction to exploring the island. Later, students complete an 8-day kayak trip that covers about 30 nautical miles. The kayak expedition takes students to the southern point of Eleuthera while further developing students’ kayaking skills and focusing on leadership training. The expedition culminates with a 48-hour solo experience in which students are spread out individually in assigned spaces along a beach. Solos are overseen by on-site faculty who support this opportunity for self-discovery.
