= Central Eleuthera =

District in the Bahamas

Coordinates: 25°08′N 76°09′W

The Location of the District of Central Eleuthera

Central Eleuthera is one of 31 administrative districts in the Bahamas, and 5 on the island of Eleuthera.

Its capital, Governor's Harbour, is the largest city in the district, with a population of 701.

== Politics ==
For elections to the Parliament of the Bahamas, it is part of the Central and South Eleuthera constituency.

== Issues ==
In 2023, the district was beset by water issues.
