= South Eleuthera =

District of The Bahamas

Coordinates: 24°48′N 76°11′W

Location of the district of South Eleuthera

South Eleuthera is one of the districts of the Bahamas, on the island of Eleuthera.

The district had a population of 4,955 in 2010. Tarpum Bay and Rock Sound are the largest settlements.

== Transportation ==
The district is served by Rock Sound International Airport.

== Politics ==
For elections to the Parliament of the Bahamas, it is part of the Central and South Eleuthera constituency.
