= Ambrosio Cave =

Ambrosio Cave or Cueva de Ambrosio may refer to:

- Ambrosio Cave, Cuba
- Ambrosio Cave, Spain
