= Ambrosio (disambiguation) =

Ambrosio is a Spanish surname and given name.

Ambrosio may also refer to:

- Ambrosio (horse), British Thoroughbred racehorse
- Ambrosio Cave, Cuba, cave and archeological site
- Ambrosio Cave, Spain, cave and archeological site
- Ambrosio Film, Italian film production and distribution company
