= List of shipwrecks in June 1874 =

The list of shipwrecks in June 1874 includes ships sunk, foundered, grounded, or otherwise lost during June 1874.

== 1 June ==
List of shipwrecks: 1 June 1874
Ship	State	Description
Emu	United Kingdom	The schooner ran aground at the mouth of the Tamar River and sank. She was on a voyage from the River Mersey to Hobart, Tasmania.

== 2 June ==
List of shipwrecks: 2 June 1874
Ship	State	Description
Francis	United Kingdom	The brigantine was run into by a steamship and sank 10 nautical miles (19 km) south south east of Flamborough Head, Yorkshire. Her crew survived. She was on a voyage from Sunderland, County Durham to Great Yarmouth, Norfolk.

== 3 June ==
List of shipwrecks: 3 June 1874
Ship	State	Description
Mooresfort	United Kingdom	The ship caught fire in the Indian Ocean and was abandoned by her crew. She was on a voyage from South Shields, County Durham to Bombay, British Raj.
Vespasian	United Kingdom	The steamship ran aground at Thessaloniki, Greece. She was refloated on 5 June.

== 4 June ==
List of shipwrecks: 4 June 1874
Ship	State	Description
Marion	United Kingdom	The brig was driven ashore at Rhoscolyn, Anglesey. She was on a voyage from Cork to Whitehaven, Cumberland. She was refloated with assistance the next day.

== 5 June ==
List of shipwrecks: 5 June 1874
Ship	State	Description
Bariza	Germany	The ship was wrecked on a reef off North Caicos, Caicos Islands. She was on a voyage from Antwerp, Belgium to East Pascagoula, Mississippi, United States.
Conrad	Denmark	The brig was driven ashore on Heligoland. She was refloated.

== 6 June ==
List of shipwrecks: 6 June 1874
Ship	State	Description
Providence	United Kingdom	The pilot boat sprang a leak and sank off Lundy Island, Devon. Her crew were rescued.
Vale of Calder	United Kingdom	The steamship was severely damaged by fire at Dundee, Forfarshire. She was on a voyage from Kronstadt, Russia to Dundee.
Vision	United Kingdom	The yawl was driven ashore on "Niel Blady". She was on a voyage from Troon, Ayrshire to Cloughy, County Down. She was refloated.

== 7 June ==
List of shipwrecks: 7 June 1874
Ship	State	Description
Athlete	United Kingdom	The steamship collided with a French steamship in the Gironde and was beached. She was subsequently refloated and towed in to Bordeaux, Gironde, France in a severely damaged condition.
Gem	New Zealand	The 6-ton ketch foundered on the Wairau Bar, New Zealand.

== 8 June ==
List of shipwrecks: 8 June 1874
Ship	State	Description
Acacia	United Kingdom	The schooner was driven ashore north of Dragør, Denmark. She was on a voyage from Riga, Russia to Leith, Lothian.

== 9 June ==
List of shipwrecks: 9 June 1874
Ship	State	Description
Energie	Germany	The barque was driven ashore at Narva, Russia,. Her crew were rescued. She was on a voyage from New Orleans, Louisiana to Narva.
Perseverance	United Kingdom	The schooner foundered in the English Channel 5 nautical miles (9.3 km) south west of St Alban's Head, Dorset. Her crew were rescued. She was on a voyage from Plymouth, Devon to Hull, Yorkshire.

== 10 June ==
List of shipwrecks: 10 June 1874
Ship	State	Description
Energie	United Kingdom	The barque was driven ashore at Narva, Russia. She was on a voyage from New Orleans, Louisiana, United States to Narva.
Good Design	United Kingdom	The brigantine foundered in the North Sea 7 nautical miles (13 km) off Spurn Point, Yorkshire. Her crew survived.
Maid of Perth	United Kingdom	The ship was wrecked on Seskar, Russia. Her crew were rescued. She was on a voyage from a British port to Kronstadt, Russia.
Peter Paul	Russia	The ship was driven ashore in the Carron River. She was on a voyage from Grangemouth, Stirlingshire, United Kingdom to Riga.
Said	United Kingdom	The steamship ran aground on the Cochinos, off Cádiz, Spain. She was on a voyage from Trieste to Bordeaux, Gironde, France. She was refloated.
Sir R. G. M. Donnell	United Kingdom	The ship struck the Whale Rock, off Mauritius and was wrecked.

== 11 June ==
List of shipwrecks: 11 June 1874
Ship	State	Description
HDMS Buhl	Royal Danish Navy	The gunboat ran aground in Hornbaek Bay and was wrecked. Her crew were rescued.
Lilian	United Kingdom	The schooner was wrecked o a reef in the Nepean River. Her crew were rescued. She was on a voyage from the River Mersey to Sydney, New South Wales.

== 12 June ==
List of shipwrecks: 12 June 1874
Ship	State	Description
Astronom	Germany	The ship was driven ashore at Bremen. She was on a voyage from New Orleans, Louisiana to Bremen.

== 15 June ==
List of shipwrecks: 15 June 1874
Ship	State	Description
Templar's Delight	United Kingdom	The yacht collided with the Mersey Flat Polly Williams (United Kingdom) and sank at Liverpool, Lancashire with the loss of one of her five crew .

== 16 June ==
List of shipwrecks: 16 June 1874
Ship	State	Description
Fairy	United Kingdom	The smack ran aground off Heligoland and was wrecked. Her crew survived.
George and William	United Kingdom	The smack ran aground and sank at Milford, Hampshire. She was on a voyage from Littlehampton, Sussex to Emsworth, Hampshire.
Tay	United Kingdom	The steam whaler was crushed by ice and wrecked in Melville Bay, Greenland. Her crew were rescued by the steamships Camperdown and Nova Zembla (both United Kingdom).
Zakynthos	United Kingdom	The steamship sprang a leak off Cape de Gatt, Spain and was beached.

== 17 June ==
List of shipwrecks: 17 June 1874
Ship	State	Description
Annie Dymes	United Kingdom	The ship was sighted in the South Atlantic whilst on a voyage from Akyab, Burma to Falmouth, Cornwall. No further trace, presumed foundered with the loss of all hands.
Star of the West	United Kingdom	The ship ran aground on the Steilsand, in the North Sea off the German coast. She was on a voyage from Curaçao, Curaçao and Dependencies to Harburg, Germany.

== 18 June ==
List of shipwrecks: 18 June 1874
Ship	State	Description
Industry	United Kingdom	The barque collided with the steamship James Harris and sank in the River Thames at Blackwall, Middlesex.
Singapoor	United Kingdom	The ship was wrecked south of Cape Guardafui, Majeerteen Sultanate with the loss of her captain. There were more than 42 survivors. She was on a voyage from Shanghai, China to London.

== 19 June ==
List of shipwrecks: 19 June 1874
Ship	State	Description
Bernardo	Italy	The barque foundered in the Atlantic Ocean. Her crew were rescued by Gilbert Wheaton (United Kingdom). Bernardo was on a voyage from Palma di Montechiaro, Sicily to Port Talbot, Glamorgan, United Kingdom.
Flying Cloud	United Kingdom	The clipper ran aground on Beach Island Bar, Saint John, New Brunswick, Canada, a total loss.
Gauntlet	United Kingdom	The ship was wrecked on Yenstay Skerry.
Kars	Ottoman Empire	The steamship was run into by the steamship Behara ( (Ottoman Empire) Egypt) and sank in the Sea of Marmara with the loss of 260 of the 297 people on board. Survivors were rescued by Behara. Kars was on a voyage from Constantinople to Thessaloniki, Greece.

== 20 June ==
List of shipwrecks: 20 June 1874
Ship	State	Description
Sixty unnamed vessels	(United Kingdom of Great Britain and Ireland) Jersey	The fishing boats sank in Chaleur Bay off Percé, Quebec, Canada. Their crews were ashore at the time.

== 24 June ==
List of shipwrecks: 24 June 1874
Ship	State	Description
Malvina	Belgium	The schooner was wrecked west of the Gadaro lighthouse, near Tenedos, Ottoman Empire, on voyage from Ibrail, Romania to Marseille, France. The crew were rescued by boats from the British naval squadron at Tenedos.

== 25 June ==
List of shipwrecks: 25 June 1874
Ship	State	Description
Charlotte	Norway	The barque ran aground. She was on a voyage from Memel, Germany to Hull, Yorkshire, United Kingdom. She was refloated and put in to Copenhagen, Denmark in a leaky condition and was placed under repair.
C. J.	United Kingdom	The schooner was driven ashore at Port Talbot, Glamorgan. She was on a voyage from Swansea to Port Talbot.

== 29 June ==
List of shipwrecks: 29 June 1874
Ship	State	Description
Fox	(United Kingdom of Great Britain and Ireland) Guernsey	The cutter sprang a leak and foundered in the English Channel. Her crew were rescued by the brigantine Surprise ( (United Kingdom of Great Britain and Ireland) Guernsey). Fox was on a voyage from Plymouth, Devon to Guernsey.

== 30 June ==
List of shipwrecks: 30 June 1874
Ship	State	Description
Eliza	United Kingdom	The schooner foundered 20 nautical miles (37 km) south of Mine Head, County Waterford. Her four crew survived. She was on a voyage from Newport, Monmouthshire to Skibbereen, County Cork.
L'Hermitte	French Navy	HMS Dido (left) assisting the wrecked L'Hermitte (right). (Illustration from the Illustrated London News, 1874.) The unprotected cruiser was wrecked on a reef off Wallis Island with the loss of two lives. The screw sloop-of-war HMS Dido (Royal Navy) arrived to assist her survivors on 20 July.
Nick King	United Kingdom	The sidewheel paddle steamer sank near Darien, Georgia, and the mouth of the Altamaha River.

== Unknown date ==
List of shipwrecks: Unknown date in June 1874
Ship	State	Description
Alpha	United Kingdom	The schooner was driven ashore on Læsø, Denmark. She was refloated and resumed her voyage.
Anna Maria	United Kingdom	The steamship was driven ashore at St Andrews, Fife. She was on a voyage from Dundee, Forfarshire to Inverkeithing, Fife.
Ann Fleming	United Kingdom	The ship was wrecked at "Northaven", Aberdeenshire. Her crew were rescued by a pilot boat.
Antigua	United Kingdom	The brig was wrecked at Saint Thomas, Virgin Islands. She was on a voyage from London to the Rio Grande.
Baltic	United Kingdom	The ship was wrecked on Red Island, Newfoundland Colony. She was on a voyage from Dartmouth, Devon to Quebec City, Canada.
Borthwick	United Kingdom	The steamship ran aground near Gallipoli, Ottoman Empire. She was refloated.
Barracouta	United Kingdom	The ship was driven ashore on the Hicacos Peninsula, Cuba.
Bretagne	France	The barque foundered at sea. Her twelve crew were rescued by a fishing vessel.
Charles Auguste	France	The ship was wrecked in the Torres Strait. At least some of her crew survived. She was on a voyage from Australia to Singapore, Straits Settlements.
Charlotte Harrison	United Kingdom	The ship was driven ashore and wrecked at Cape North, Nova Scotia, Canada. She was on a voyage from Cardiff, Glamorgan to Quebec City.
Christiania	Norway	The barque ran aground. She was on a voyage from Riga, Russia to Havre de Grâce, Seine-Inférieure, France. She was refloated and put in to Gothenburg, Sweden for repairs.
Cleopas	United Kingdom	The ship was driven ashore on Long Cay, Bahamas. She was on a voyage from Jamaica to London. She was refloated and found to be severely leaky. Consequently taken in to Nassau, Bahamas for repairs.
Euclid	United Kingdom	The schooner was driven ashore at Bic, Quebec, Canada.
Faraday	United Kingdom	The steamship struck an iceberg off Halifax, Nova Scotia, Canada and was severely damaged.
Flintshire	Queensland	The steamship was wrecked at Cape Cleveland before 29 June. All on board were rescued. She was on a voyage from Townsville to Moreton Bay.
Flor de Maria	Spain	The ship was wrecked on the Bornedra Rocks, in Vigo Bay. She was on a voyage from Huelva to Cardiff.
Gomes	Brazil	The steamship ran aground and was wrecked in the Rio Grande. Her crew were rescued.
Groningen	Netherlands	The ship was driven ashore on Læsø. She was on a voyage from Landskrona, Sweden to Newcastle upon Tyne, Northumberland, United Kingdom. She was refloated on 24 June and taken in to Fredrikshavn, Denmark in a leaky condition.
Harvest Home	Canada	The ship was wrecked in the Magdalen Islands, Nova Scotia. She was on a voyage from Málaga, Spain to Saguenay, Quebec.
Henrietta	United Kingdom	The ship collided with an iceberg and sank. She was on a voyage from Barrow-in-Furness, Lancashire to Bridgewater, Nova Scotia, Canada.
Herbert C. Hall	Germany	The ship was driven ashore on Green Island, Canada. She was on a voyage from Bremen to Quebec City.
Hope	United Kingdom	The ship was wrecked at Les Escoumins, Quebec. She was on a voyage from Belfast, County Antrim to Quebec City.
Isabelle	Spain	The ship was wrecked near Sagua La Grande, Cuba. She was on a voyage from Callao, Peru to Havana, Cuba.
Lap Tek	China	The steamship was wrecked at Keelung, Formosa.
Jenny	Russia	The barque capsized in a squall at Havana.
Luna	Germany	The steamship was driven ashore on "Refnaes". She was refloated and taken in to Copenhagen, Denmark for repairs.
Merrington	United Kingdom	The ship was wrecked at Les Escoumins. She was on a voyage from Liverpool, Lancashire to Quebec City.
Möwe	Germany	The ship was driven ashore at Bolderāja, Russia and was abandoned by all but her captain. She was on a voyage from Copenhagen, Denmark to Bolderāja.
Niphon	Germany	The brig was wrecked at Alvarado, Mexico.
Percy Thompson	United Kingdom	The ship foundered at sea. She was on a voyage from the Bull River to London.
Pontecorvo	Norway	The ship was abandoned at sea before 6 June. She was on a voyage from Kristiansand to Quebec City.
Prince Alfred	Canada	The ship was wrecked at "Potato Cove". She was on a voyage from Victoria, British Columbia to San Francisco, California, United States.
Rio Grande	United Kingdom	The brig was wrecked on Antigua.
Ryerson	Canada	The ship ran aground on Sarn Badrig. She was refloated with the assistance of a tug and the Barmouth Lifeboat.
Seaton	United Kingdom	The steamship was driven ashore at "Hessilo". She was on a voyage from Sunderland, County Durham to Kronstadt, Russia. She was refloated and taken in to Helsingør, Denmark in a leaky condition.
Sir G. M. Donnell	United Kingdom	The barque was wrecked on the Whale Rock, off the coast of Mauritius before 10 June.
Sophie Jobson	United Kingdom	The steamship ran aground in the River Usk. She was on a voyage from Newport, Monmouthshire to Santander, Spain.
Stolaff	Norway	The barque was abandoned in the Atlantic Ocean.
St. Paul	United Kingdom	The ship was wrecked in the Tobasco River. She was on a voyage from Key West, Florida, United States to Falmouth, Cornwall.
Therese	United Kingdom	The ship was driven ashore at Sandy Beach.
Troubadour	United Kingdom	The steamship struck a rock at Viana do Castelo, Portugal before 26 June. She was on a voyage from London to Porto, Portugal. She was refloated and completed her voyage in a leaky condition.
Wear	United Kingdom	The steamship was driven ashore at Dragør, Denmark. She was on a voyage from Kronstadt to Rotterdam, South Holland, Netherlands.
Wilhelm	Norway	The ship foundered at sea.
Wilhelmina	Netherlands	The barque was wrecked in the Bali Strait before 18 June.
