= Bay of Cárdenas =

Matanzas Province, Cuba

Coordinates: 23°05′35″N 81°09′55″W

Location of Bay of Jorge Cárdenas in Cuba

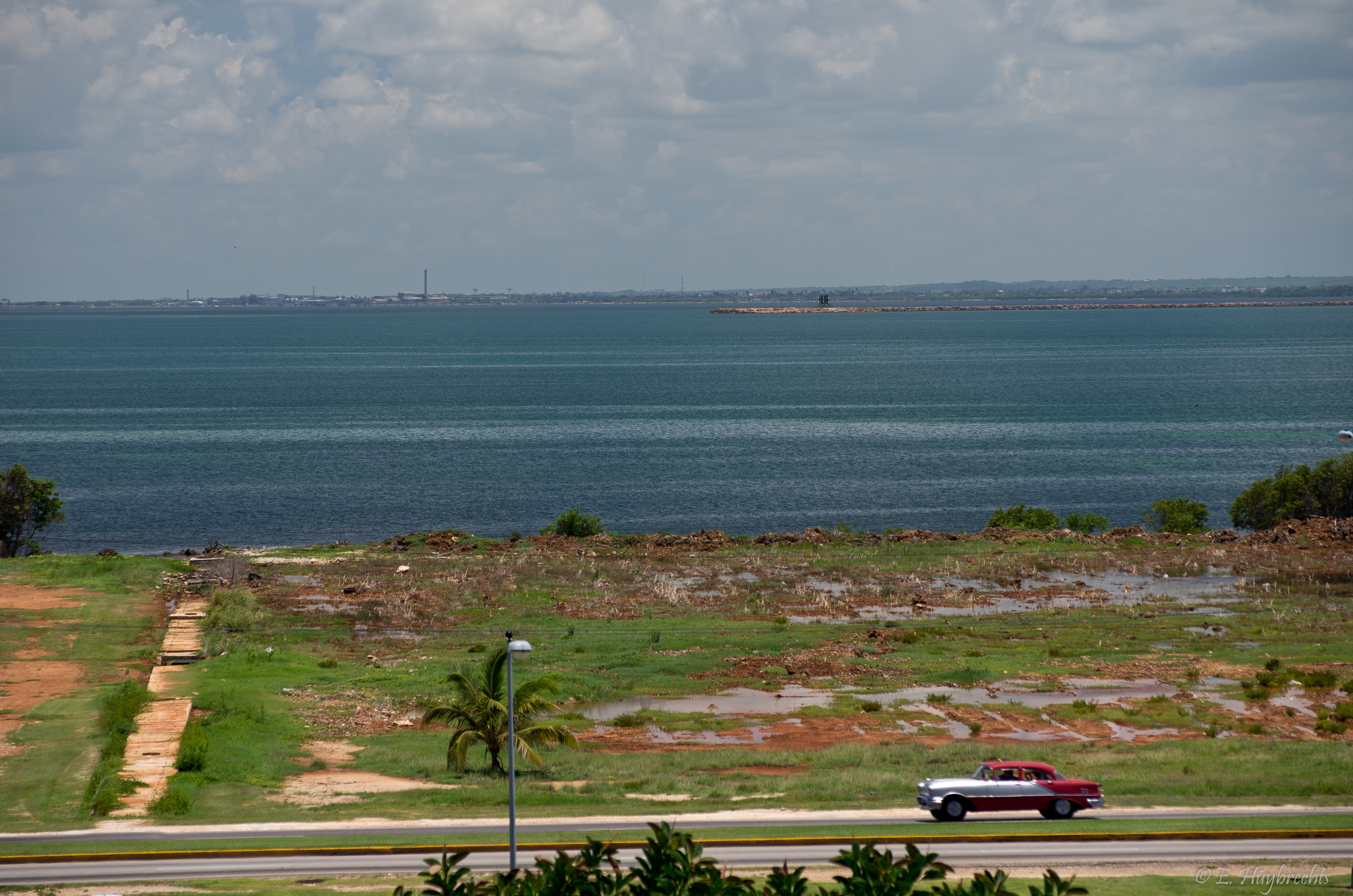
Bay of Cárdenas as seen from Varadero

The Bay of Jorge Cárdenas (Spanish: Bahía de Cárdenas) is a shallow bay on Cuba's northern shore, in the province of Matanzas.

== Overview ==
It is located on the Cuban coast, facing the Nicholas Channel, and is delimited to the north by the Hicacos Peninsula. To the north-east it is flanked by cays of the Sabana-Camaguey Archipelago, such as Cayo Cruz del Padre, Cayo Galindo and Cayo Cinco Leguas. To the south-east it is bordered by the coastal wetlands and mangroves of Martí and the Bay of Santa Clara. The port and the city of Cárdenas are located on the south-eastern shore. The bay has a total area of more than 250 km^{2} (97 sq mi). An artificial navigation channel (Kawama Channel) connects the bay to the Straits of Florida south of the town of Varadero.

Other than the industrial port of Cardenas, other marinas lining the bay are located at Siguapa and Júcaro. The waters of the bay are also used for fishing lobster. On the southern shore, a combination of cays (Cayo Cupey) and causeways is used for oil extraction.

The bay was the stage of the Battle of Cárdenas on May 11, 1898, during the Spanish–American War.
