= Cueva de Saturno =

- Saturn Cave
- Interactive map of Cueva de Saturno
- Location: Carbanera, Matanzas Province, Cuba
- Depth: 20m

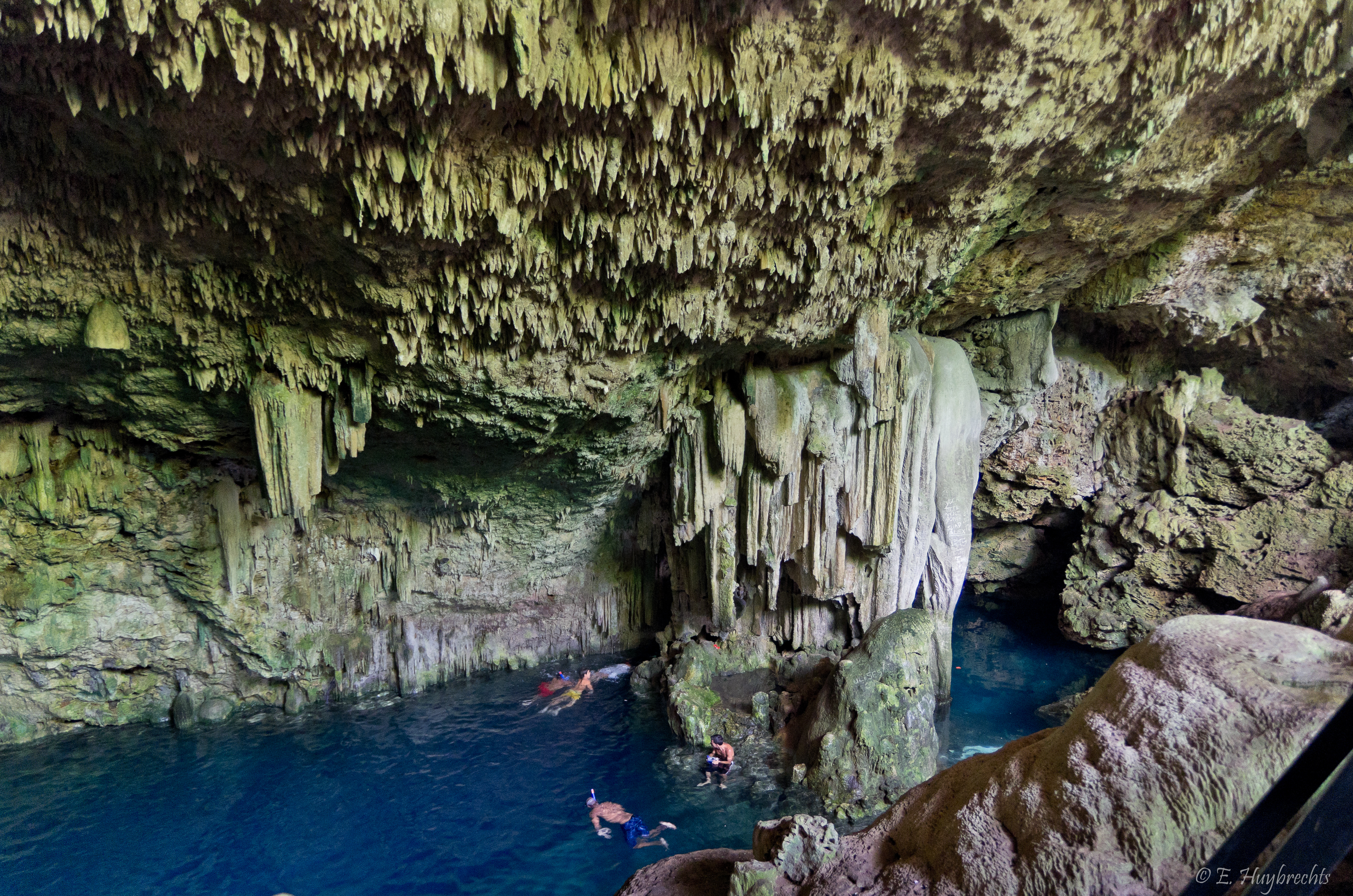
Cenote Cueva Saturno

Cueva de Saturno, or Saturn Cave, is a cenote cave located near Varadero, Matanzas Province, Cuba. The cave consists of a large opening, the denote, and some offshoot caverns. Stalactites and blind cavefish and cave shrimp. Scuba diving is popular in the cenote itself.
