= Bay of Santa Clara =

Coordinates: 23°08′N 80°40′W

Location of Bay of Santa Clara in Cuba

The Bay of Santa Clara is a bay on Cuba's north coast, located between the Nicholas Channel and the northern coast of the provinces of Matanzas and Villa Clara.

The northern and western edges of the bay are defined by the islands and cays of the Sabana-Camaguey Archipelago, while to the south it is bordered by the wetlands and swamps of northern Martí, Corralillo and Quemado de Güines. To the west it is bounded by the Bay of Cardenas, that stretches west of the Cinco Leguas cays.
