= Máximo Gómez, Cuba =

Máximo Gómez Guanajayabo
- Village
- Location of Máximo Gómez in Cuba
- Coordinates: 22°54′15″N 81°01′45″W
- Country: Cuba
- Province: Matanzas
- Municipality: Perico

Population (2011)
  - Total: 8,041
- Time zone: UTC-5 (EST)
- Area code: +53-52

Máximo Gómez is a Cuban village and consejo popular belonging to the municipality of Perico, in Matanzas Province.

== History ==
The town was founded in 1770 under the name Guanajayabo. The name was changed in honour of the independence war leader Máximo Gómez.

From 1902 until 1927 it was part of the municipality of Martí. From 1927 was the seat of its own municipality that included the communities of Rancho del Medio and Sabanilla de la Palma until 1976, when its territories were split in the municipalities of Martí and Perico.
