= Blanca Rosa Gil =

- Born: Blanca Rosa Gil; August 26, 1937 (age 88); Perico, Matanzas, Cuba
- Genres: Bolero Spanish/Cuban
- Occupation: Vocalist
- Years active: 1952-2009
- Labels: Modiner, Rosy, Peerless, Maype, Velvet, Benson, Fania, Lobo, Liznel
- Website: Official website

Blanca Rosa Gil (born August 26, 1937 in Perico, Matanzas, Cuba) is a famous Cuban Latin Bolero singer known as 'The Singing Dolly'.

== Singing career ==
Blanca Rosa Gil's first album 'Shadows' was recorded in Venezuela in 1957. In the 1950s, 1960's and 1970's, Gil recorded albums on various different labels: Velvet, Benson, Echo, Discuba, Maype, and Modiner. She is best known for her hit song 'Te Odio Y Te Quiero' (Mi Triumfo). A number of her many classic Bolero recordings on long play record albums have been rereleased on Compact disc.

== Later life ==
Gil left Cuba for Caracas, Venezuela with her family in 1955. She returned to Cuba as a singer in 1962, but was subsequently exiled to Miami, Florida, where she lived for nine years. She married and has resided in 'La Isla Borinquen', Puerto Rico, for the past 40 years. Gil has concentrated on Christian religious singing in recent years, and still sings in Evangelical churches. Gil's Bolero music has experienced a revival in recent years due to reissuance of her record albums on Compact disc and MP3, and she occasionally returns to the stage to perform her Cuban Bolero classic songs. In 2013, Gil appeared live in concert at Miami-Dade Auditorium in Miami, Florida.

== Partial List of Albums Recorded By Blanca Rosa Gil ==
Long Play (LP) Recordings

- Canta Sombras (Modiner LPN-1002) 1959-60
- La Muñequita que Canta/Cristal (Cisne/Rosy, CI 1019) Mexico 1961-62
- Aquel Rosario Blanco (Peerless LD 698) Mexico 1962
- Bajo Las Luces De México (ECO 208-Peerless) 1962
- La Triunfadora de Cuba (Maype US-141) USA 1964
- La Cancionera Internacional (Velvet 1302)
- Voz y Estilo de La Única... (Velvet 1317)
- Hambre (Velvet LPV-1332) 1965
- En Su Momento... (Velvet 1346) 196_
- Dueña y Señora de la Canción (Velvet 1369) 1968
- El Alma Que Canta (Velvet LPV-1374)
- Tú Me Hiciste Mujer (Velvet 1382)
- Yo Soy La Buena (Velvet LPV-1397)
- Estos Ojos, Estas Manos (Velvet 1409)
- Pecadora Mental (Velvet L)
- Mas Exitos (Velvet LPVS-1419)
- El Sentimiento Hecho Bolero (Velvet 1429)
- Su Majestad (Velvet 1443)
- Maestras de Maestras..! (Benson BLP-1256)
- La Grande de América (Benson BPL-1257)
- Vete Ya, LP/LD (Benson 1258)
- La Doña (Benson 1259)
- Punto Final... y Hacia Adelante!, LP/LD (Fania/Intern. 451)1974
- Sigo Siendo Reina (LOBO1003) 1976
- Blanca Rosa Gil (Liznel 1389) 1979
- Ayer y Hoy Con Los Montemar (2007) Blanca Rosa Gil y Los Montemar

Date below indicates rerelease on compact disc

- 40 Anos 40 Exitos (Date Unknown) Import
- Triunfadora de Cuba (2008)
- No Soy Tu Esclava (2006)
- Las Voces Del Siglo (2006)
- Los Anos de Oro / Besos Brujos (2006)
- Besos Brujos (2005)
- Yo Soy La Buena (2003)
- La Duena y El Senora del Bolero (2000)
- Antologia Cuba /Blanca Rosa Gil (1999)
- Besos de Juegos (1999)
- Tu Me Hiciste Mujer (1998)
- 15 Super Exitos (1997)
- Duena y Senora de la Cancion (1996)
- Hambre (1995)
- 15 Exitos (1994)
- La Munequita Que Canta (1993)
- Boleros (1992) Remastered
- Unica Entrega (date unknown)
