= Tony Martínez =

Cuban baseball player (1940–1991)

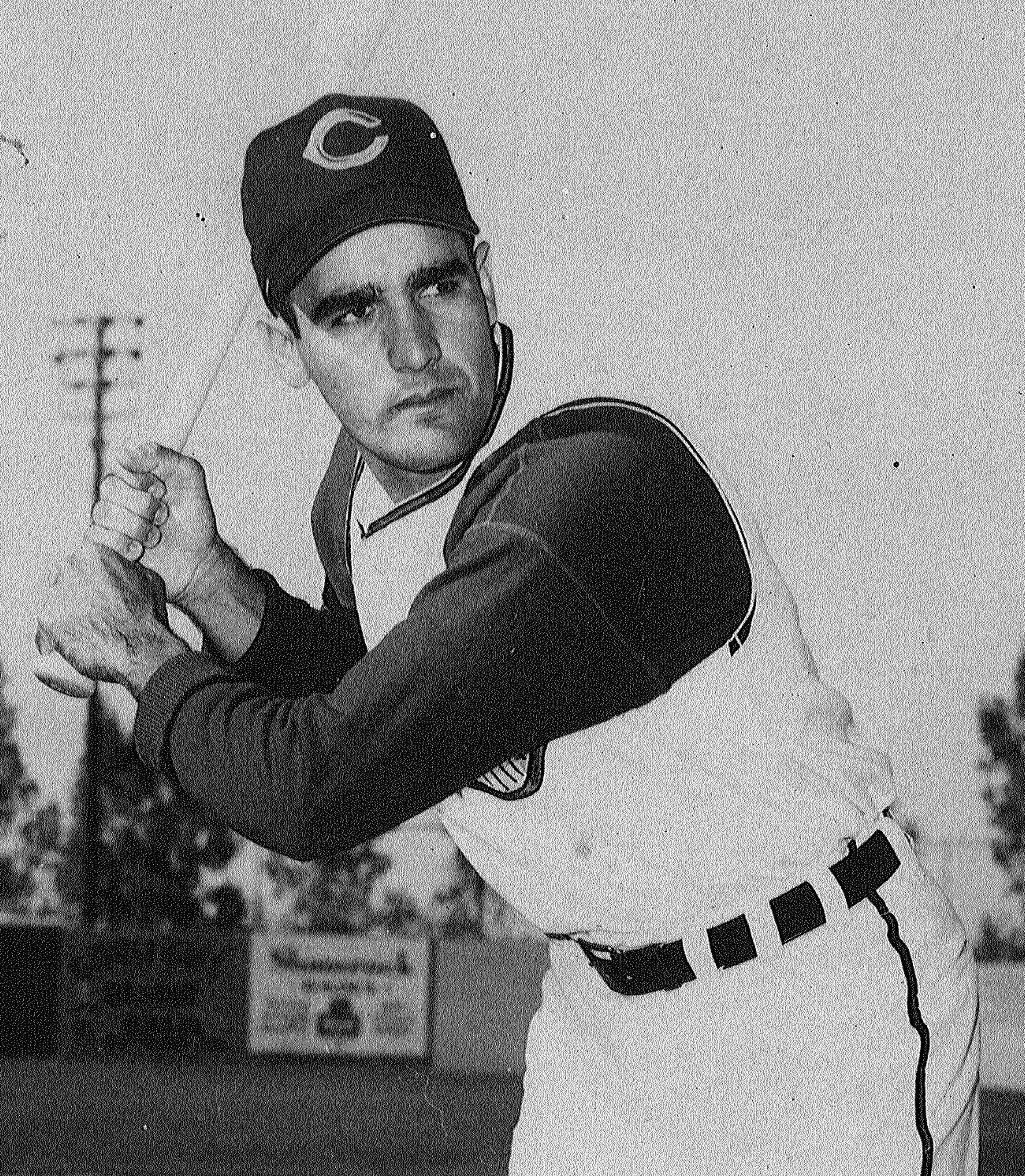
- Shortstop
- Born: March 18, 1940; Perico, Matanzas Province, Cuba
- Died: August 24, 1991 (aged 51); Miami, Florida, U.S.
- Batted: Right Threw: Right

MLB debut
- April 9, 1963, for the Cleveland Indians

Last MLB appearance
- June 14, 1966, for the Cleveland Indians

MLB statistics
- Batting average: .171
- Home runs: 0
- Runs batted in: 10
- Stats at Baseball Reference

Teams
- Cleveland Indians (1963–1966)

Gabriel Antonio Martínez Díaz (March 18, 1940 – August 24, 1991) was a Cuban-born Major League Baseball shortstop who played in parts of four seasons for the Cleveland Indians (1963–66), appearing in 73 career games. The native of Perico threw and batted right-handed, stood 5 feet 10 inches (1.78 m) and weighed 165 pounds (75 kg).

Martínez' professional career began at the Class C level in 1960, but by his third pro season he was an All-Star shortstop in Triple-A, winning the 1962 Most Valuable Player Award in the International League at age 22 as a member of the pennant-winning Jacksonville Suns. He was named the 1963 Indians' first-string shortstop coming out of spring training and started the Tribe's first 35 regular-season games. But he hit only .167 with 21 hits. Finally, on May 26, Cleveland optioned Martínez back to Jacksonville and acquired his replacement at shortstop, Dick Howser, in a trade with the Kansas City Athletics. Martínez continued to struggle at Jacksonville, but was recalled in September for another eight-game trial. He spent the remainder of his pro career in the minors, apart from 30 more games with the Indians during sporadic call-ups from 1964–66.

He was traded along with Jerry Buchek and Art Mahaffey from the St. Louis Cardinals to the New York Mets for Ed Bressoud, Danny Napoleon and cash on April 1, 1967.

Martínez' 30 big-league hits included five doubles. He drove in ten runs.
