= Perico, Cuba =

Perico
- Municipality
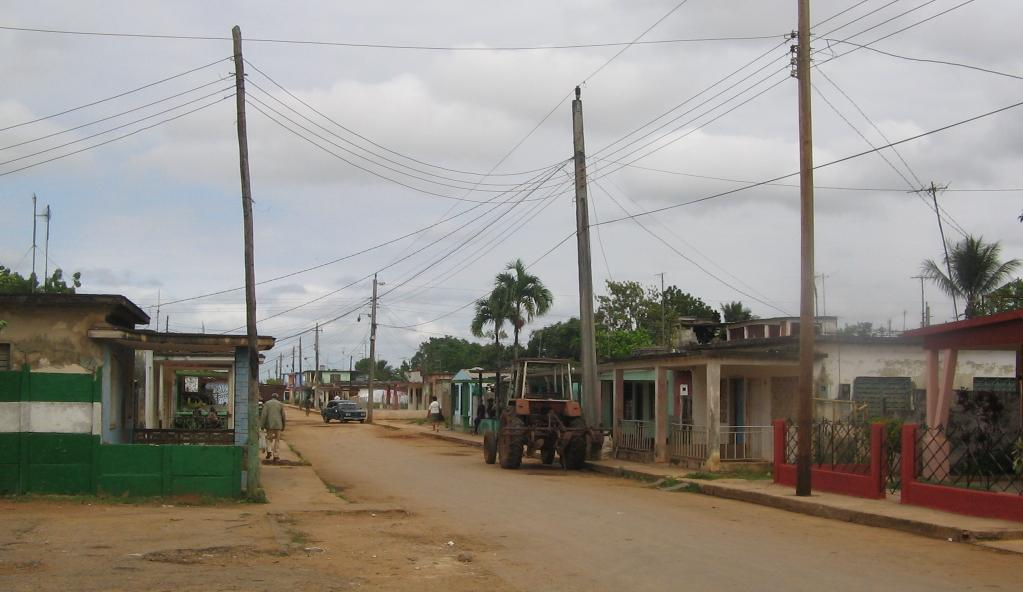
- A rural road near town's central road.

- Coat of arms

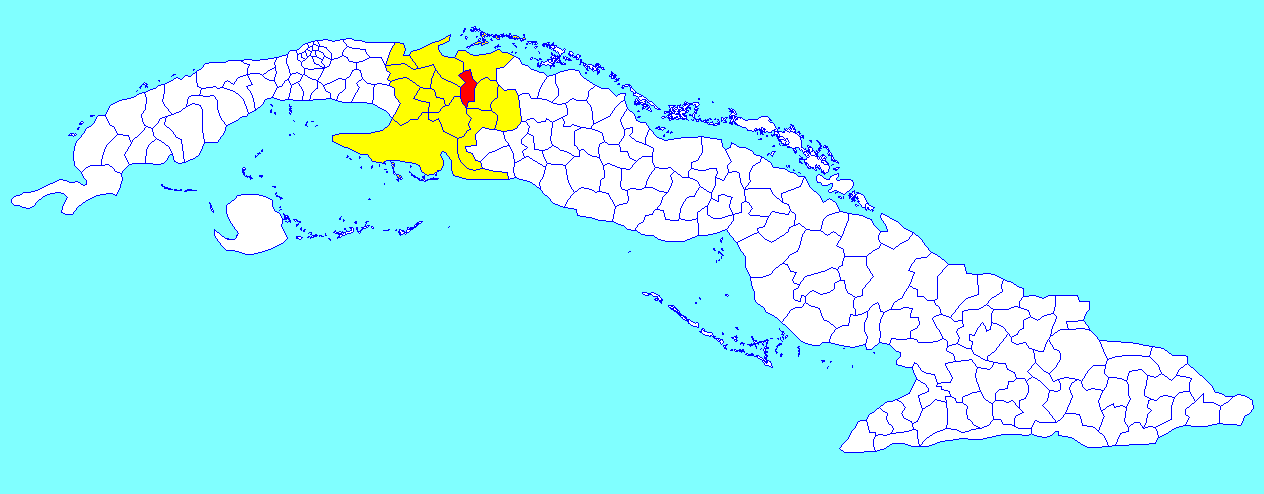
- Perico municipality (red) within Matanzas Province (yellow) and Cuba
- Coordinates: 22°46′31″N 81°00′55″W
- Country: Cuba
- Province: Matanzas
- Founded: 1874
- Established: 1879

Area
  - Total: 278 km^{2} (107 sq mi)
- Elevation: 35 m (115 ft)

Population (2022)
  - Total: 29,746
  - Density: 107/km^{2} (277/sq mi)
- Time zone: UTC-5 (EST)
- Area code: +53-52

Perico is a municipality and town in the Matanzas Province of Cuba. It is located south of Marti, north of Colón and east of Jovellanos.

== Geography ==
The municipality is divided into the barrios of Altamisal, Norte, Quintana, Roque, Sur and Tinguaro.

It counts the hamlets (consejos populares) of España Republicana, meaning Republican Spain, and Máximo Gómez, named after the military commander in Cuban War of Independence.

== History ==
Perico was founded in 1874 near a garrison of the Spanish Colonial Civil Guard. The name was changed in 1885 to Miguel de Cervantes, then restored to Perico in 1899.

On 4 February 2026, a weather station near Perico recorded the first freezing temperatures ever recorded in Cuba.

== Demographics ==
In 2022, the municipality of Perico had a population of 29,746. With a total area of 278 km^{2} (107 sq mi), it has a population density of 110/km^{2} (280/sq mi).

== Transport ==
Perico is crossed by the Carretera Central highway and counts a railway station of the main line from Havana to Santiago de Cuba.

== Notable people ==
- Félix Navarro Rodríguez, dissident He was later released.
- Minnie Miñoso, famed American League baseball player.
- Blanca Rosa Gil (1937-), famous Cuban bolero singer.
- Tony Martínez, 1962 International League Most Valuable Player Award.

== See also ==
- Municipalities of Cuba
- List of cities in Cuba
