= Martí, Cuba =

Martí
- Municipality
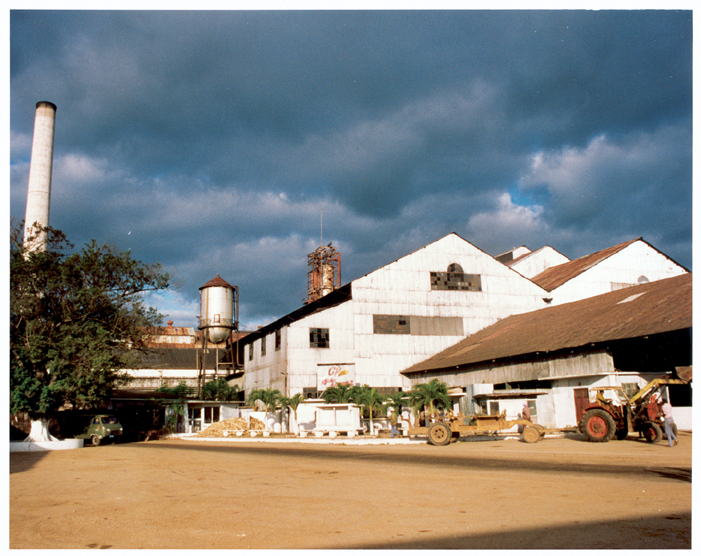
- The old sugar refinery "Guipuzcúa"

- Coat of arms

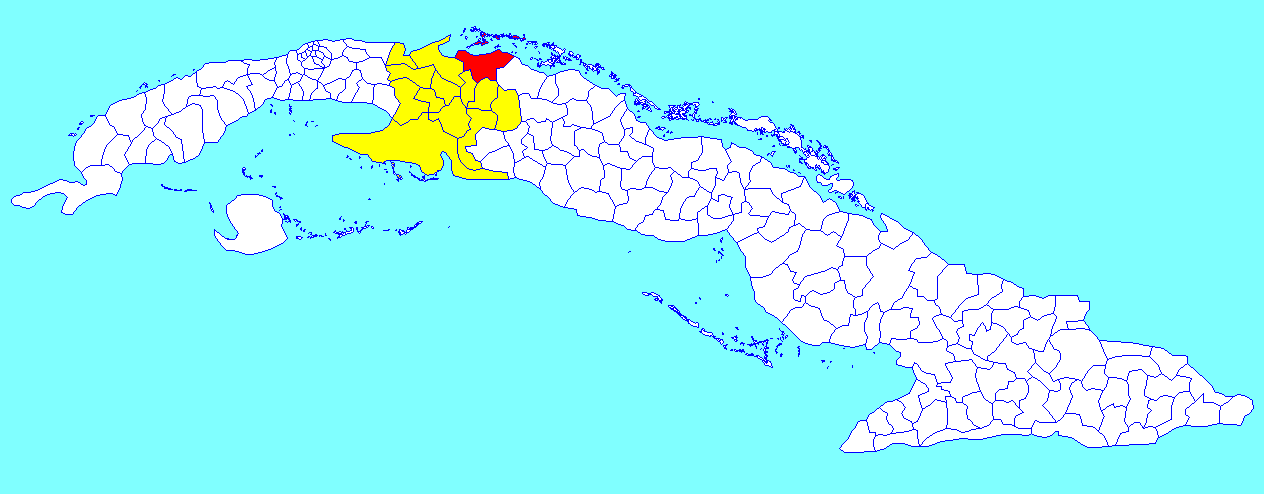
- Martí municipality (red) within Matanzas Province (yellow) and Cuba
- Coordinates: 22°57′8″N 80°55′0″W
- Country: Cuba
- Province: Matanzas
- Founded: 1835 (Hato Nuevo)
- Established: 1879

Area
  - Total: 1,070 km^{2} (410 sq mi)
- Elevation: 20 m (66 ft)

Population (2022)
  - Total: 21,582
  - Density: 20.2/km^{2} (52.2/sq mi)
- Time zone: UTC-5 (EST)
- Area code: +53-56

Martí is a Cuban town and municipality in north-eastern section of Matanzas Province.

== Geography ==
The municipality is divided into the barrios of Guamutas, Lacret, La Teja, Martí, Motembo and Río de la Palma. From 1902 until 1927 the village of Máximo Gómez (now part of Perico), was part of Martí.

It is located on the north-central coast of Cuba, and includes the lagoons Inglés, Bibanasí and Majagüillar, all extensions of the Bay of Santa Clara (Bahia de Santa Clara). Its territory is crossed by the rivers La Palma, Júcaro and San Manuel.

== History ==
The town was founded in 1835 was established in 1835 under the name Hato Nuevo on the location of the Bibanosí ranch. On 24 December 1898 the name was changed to Martí, in honour of independence hero José Martí.

== Demographics ==
In 2022, the municipality of Martí had a population of 21,582. With a total area of 1,070 km^{2} (410 sq mi), it has a population density of 21.9/km^{2} (57/sq mi).

== See also ==
- Municipalities of Cuba
- List of cities in Cuba
