= Hicacos Peninsula =

Peninsula on Cuba

Coordinates: 23°11′52″N 81°09′05″W

Location of Hicacos Peninsula in Cuba

The Hicacos Peninsula (Spanish: Península de Hicacos) is a peninsula on Cuba's northern shore, in the province of Matanzas. The resort town of Varadero is located on the peninsula. The name comes from a species of cactus.

== Geography ==
It is located between the Bay of Cárdenas and the Nicholas Channel of the Atlantic Ocean, and its extremity (Punta Hicacos) constitutes the northernmost point of the island of Cuba. It has a length of 18 kilometres (11 mi) and a width varying between 0.5 km (0.31 mi) and 2.5 km (1.6 mi).

The cays developed offshore, such as Cayo Piedras and Cayo Cruz del Padre are the westernmost part of the Sabana-Camaguey Archipelago.

The Kawama navigation channel was opened between the Bay of Cardenas and the northern shore, to allow faster transit of ships from the port of Cárdenas to the northern shore, making a bridge the only access to the peninsula. The highway that crosses it and runs the length of Hicacos is the northern extremity of the Via Blanca highway, and it provides access to the resorts and marina located on the northern end.

== Tourism ==
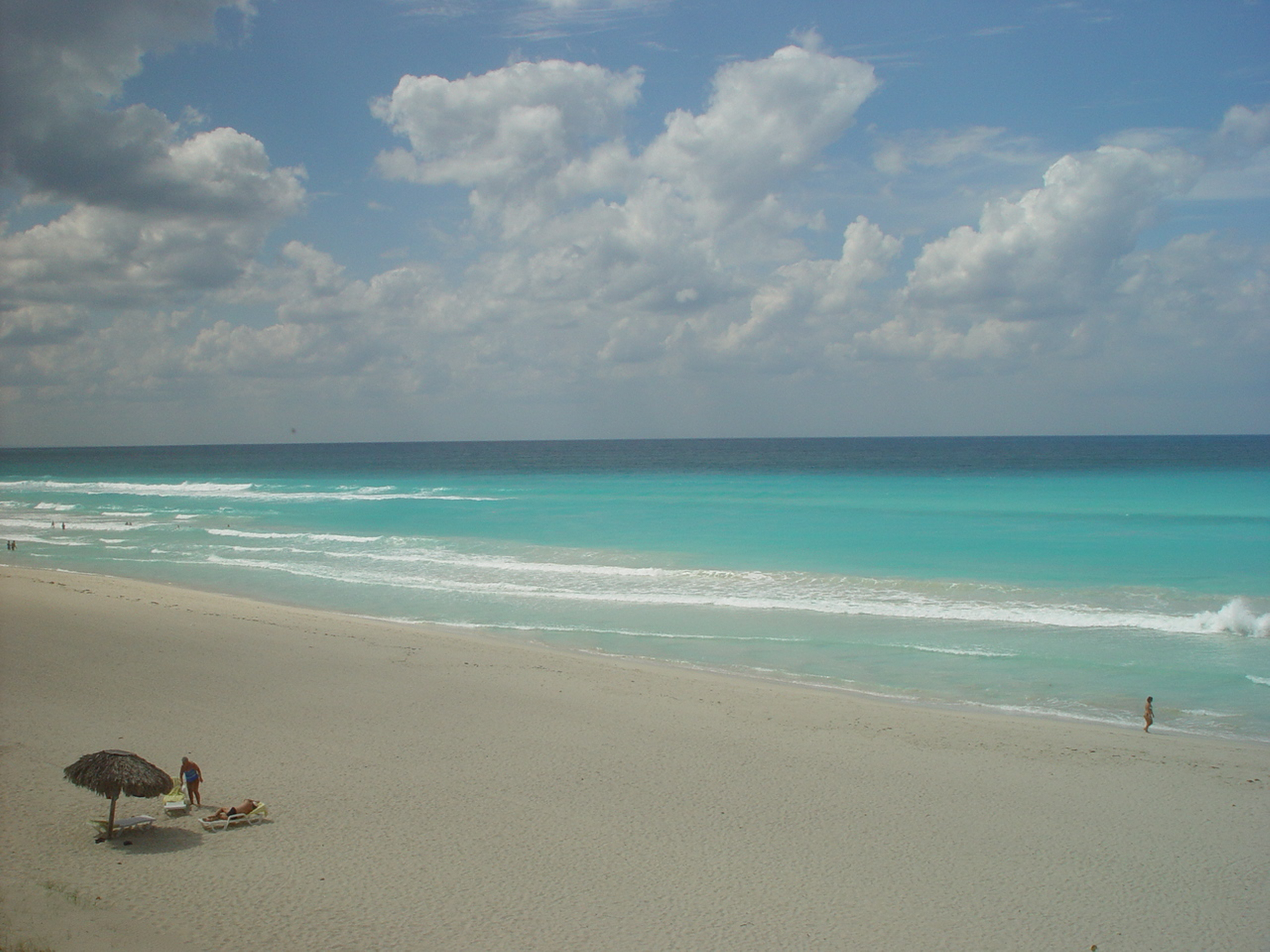
White sand beach on the northern shore

The white sand beaches that line the northern shore lead to the development of the resort town of Varadero close to the mainland, while the further end is lined with all-inclusive resorts. The Josone Park sits between the two areas. A small marina and a dolphinarium are located on the southeastern shore. The Hicacos Point Natural Park is a 3.12 km^{2} (1.20 sq mi) ecological preserve established in 1974 on the northeastern tip. It contains the 250 m (820 ft) long Cave of Ambrosio, Mangón Lake (home to 31 species of birds and 24 species of reptiles) and the ruins of the La Calavera (The Skull) Salt Works, one of the first salt works to be constructed by the Spanish in the New World.

== See also ==
- Geography of Cuba
