= Varadero =

Varadero Península de Hicacos
- City
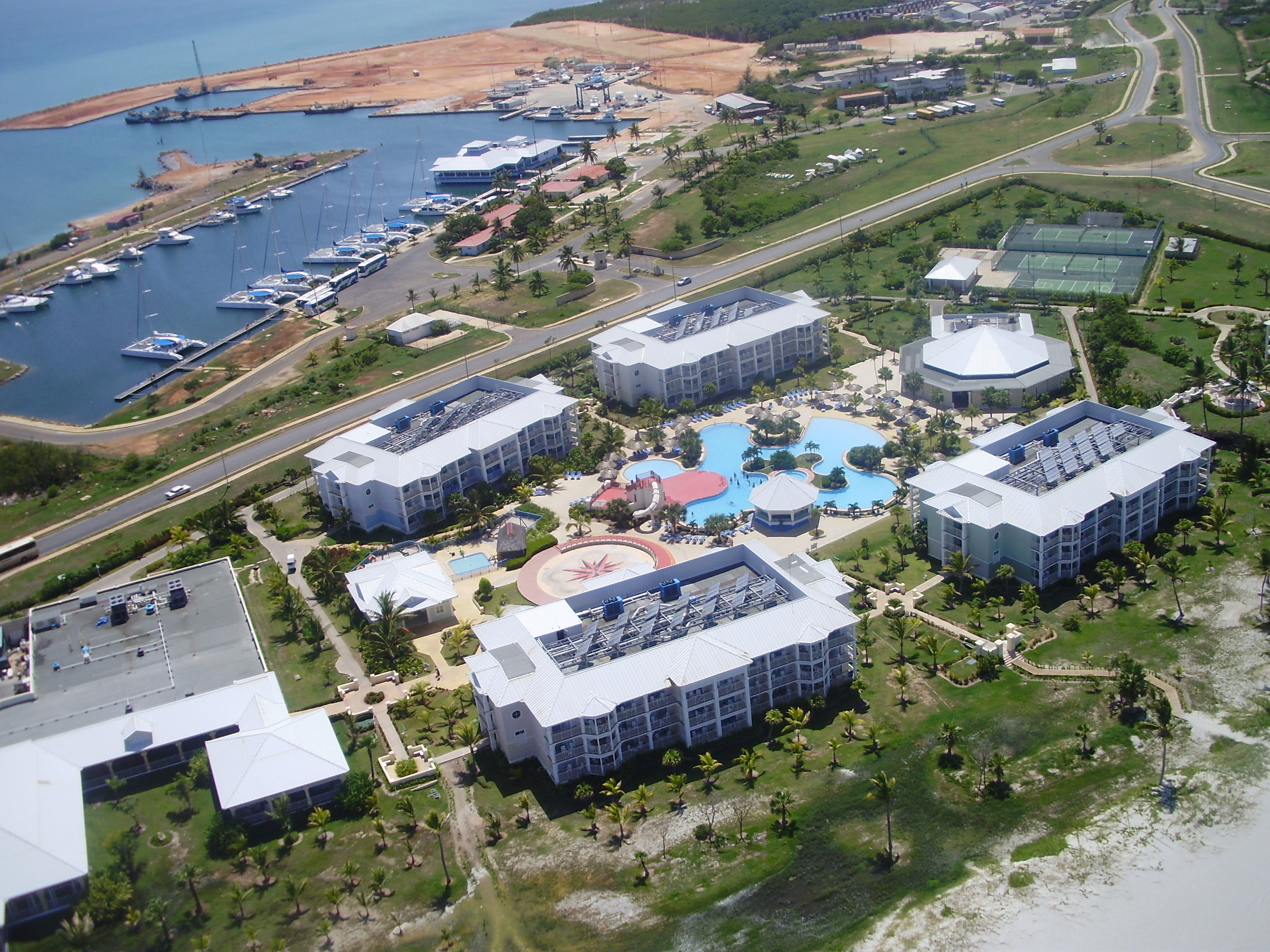
- Aerial photo of Varadero

- Coat of arms
- Nickname: Playa Azul (Blue Beach)
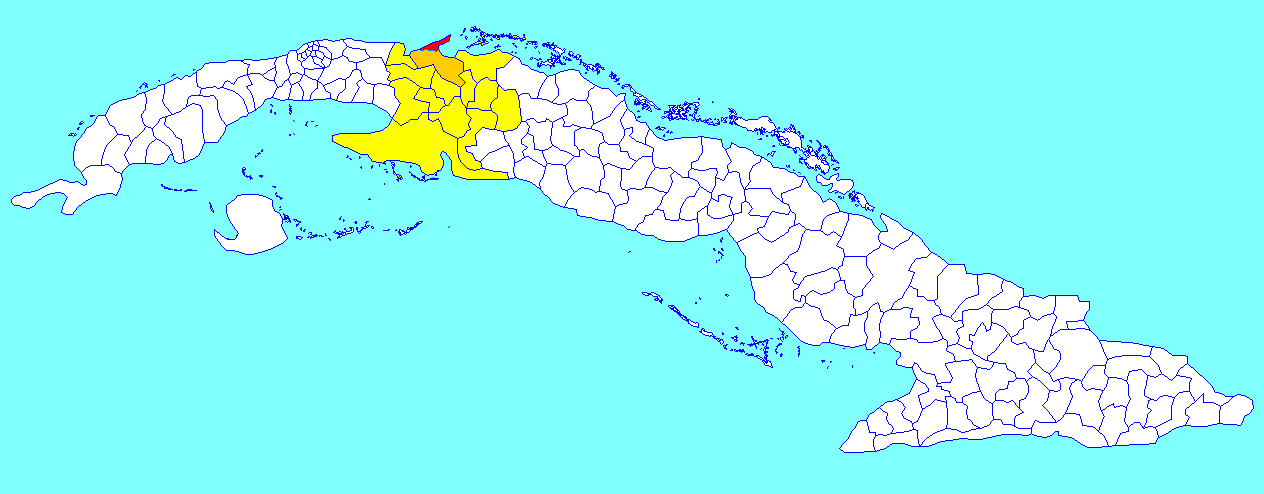
- The former Varadero municipality (red) within Matanzas Province (yellow) and Cuba. The rest of Cárdenas municipality is shown in orange

- Location of Varadero in Cuba
- Coordinates: 23°08′22″N 81°17′10″W
- Country: Cuba
- Province: Matanzas
- Municipality: Cárdenas
- Founded: December 5, 1887
- Established: July 3, 1976 (as a municipality)
- Dissolved: August 1, 2010 (as a municipality)

Area
  - Total: 48 km^{2} (19 sq mi)
- Elevation: 4 m (13 ft)

Population (2014)
  - Total: 42,654
  - Density: 566/km^{2} (1,470/sq mi)
- Time zone: UTC-5 (EST)
- Area code: +53-45

Varadero (Spanish pronunciation: [baɾaˈðeɾo]), also referred to as Playa Azul (Blue Beach), is a resort town in the province of Matanzas, Cuba, and one of the largest resort areas in the Caribbean. Varadero Beach is rated one of the world's best beaches in TripAdvisor's Traveler's Choice Awards since 2019, ranking at number 9 as of January 2024. Common activities include fishing and excursions to Matanzas, Cárdenas, and the Península de Zapata.

== Geography ==
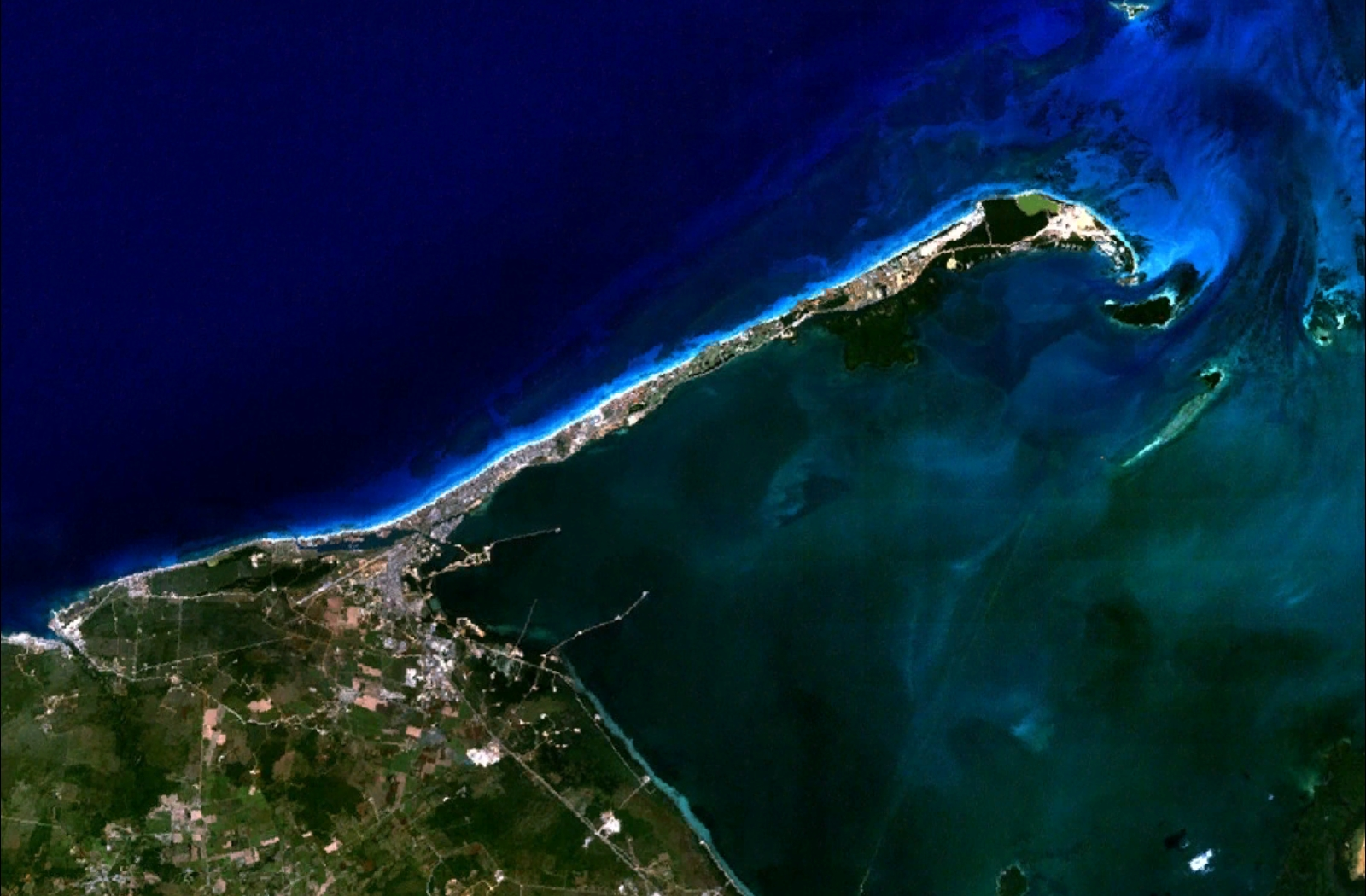
Satellite photo of Varadero

Varadero is a two-hour drive east of central Havana. It is situated on the Hicacos Peninsula, between the Bay of Cárdenas and the Straits of Florida, some 140 km east of Havana, at the eastern end of the Via Blanca highway. The peninsula is only 1.2 km wide at its widest point and is separated from the island of Cuba by the artificial Kawama Channel, in the middle of which is the wider Laguna Paso Malo. This spit of land extends more than 20 kilometers from the mainland in a northeasterly direction and its tip, Punta Hicacos, is the northernmost point of the island of Cuba. Varadero's town has three longitudinal avenues, intersected by 69 cross streets. At the northeastern end of the peninsula there is a nature reserve with virgin forests and beaches. The Hicacos Point Natural Park is a 3.12 km^{2} (1.20 sq mi) ecological preserve established in 1974. It contains the 250 m (820 ft)-long Ambrosio Cave, Mangón Lake (home to 31 species of birds and 24 species of reptiles) and the ruins of the La Calavera (The Skull) Salt Works (one of the first salt works to be constructed by the Spanish in the New World). The cays developed off shore, such as Cayo Piedras del Norte and Cayo Cruz del Padre are the westernmost part of the Sabana-Camaguey Archipelago.

Juan Gualberto Gómez Airport, located 16 kilometers west of Varadero and situated west of the peninsula, is Varadero's airport. It is the second-most important airport of the island after José Martí Airport in Havana, and serves international and domestic flights. It was finished in the 1990s and replaced the old Varadero airport.

== Economy ==
Havana and Varadero each have the greatest development in Cuba. Varadero generates and provides over 50,000 jobs with over 52 hotel facilities. Canada's Blue Island and Spain's Meliá, Iberostar and Globalia are some of the foreign companies that operate these hotels. A record 1.7 million foreign tourists visited the resort in 2017. Plans for the next three years exist to build at least 3,000 more rooms in five-star hotels, to add facilities including a theme park and a shopping mall, and to bring back the Festival de la Cancion, a music festival.

== Climate ==
The climate in Varadero is tropical, for it is at sea level at the tip of the island. Weather may change due to many factors such as exposure to hurricanes, windy tropical storms and by the cooling effect of the trade winds. It is surrounded by enormous bodies of water that can cool air flowing from North America. The yearly mean is 25˚ Celsius (77 ˚F). Summer mean is 27˚Celsius (80.6 ˚F), while winter mean is 21˚C (69.8 ˚F). Humidity is 81% and the average yearly rainfall is roughly 1,400 millimeters (55 inches). June 1 is the beginning of hurricane season; this normally ends on November 15. September and October are the months when hurricanes are most likely to occur.

Hurricane Irma making landfall near Varadero, Cuba

Over 150 hurricanes have passed through the country of Cuba since 1498, when Christopher Columbus first recorded them. These hurricanes have caused significant damage to the Cuban economy and claimed many Cuban lives. One of the worst hurricanes occurred in 1791 and killed an estimated 3,000 Cubans. The most recent, Hurricane Irma, hit Varadero as a Category 5 storm on September 8, 2017. Irma claimed 10 Cuban lives and caused major flooding and wind damage. Meteorologists reported this hurricane as one of the biggest in the Atlantic and the strong winds were reported at 125 mph. Irma ripped many trees from the ground and roofs from homes. Much of Varadero was damaged, along with the country's agricultural main crops such as sugar.

== History ==
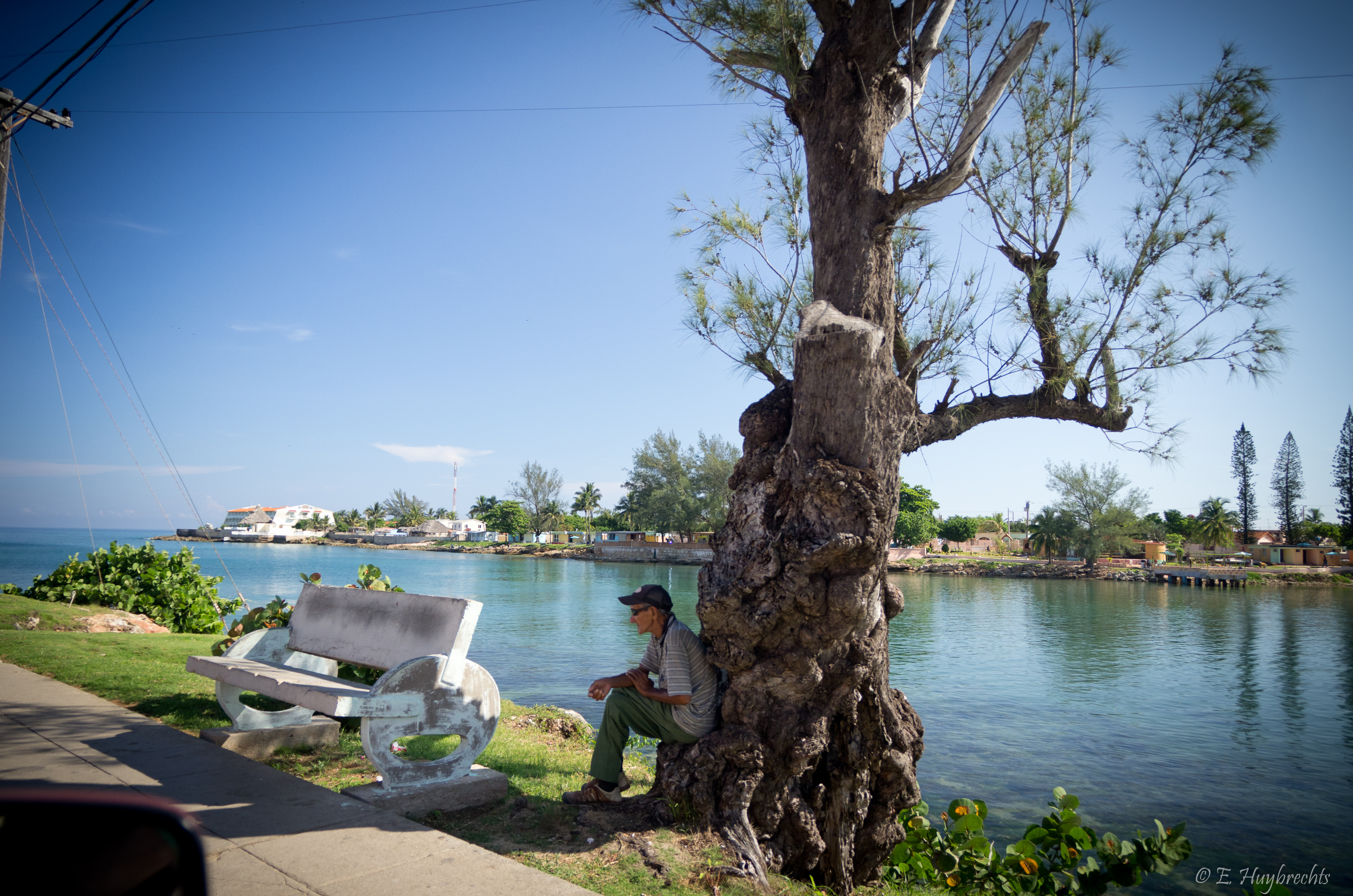
Boca de Camarioca

Varadero was mentioned for the first time in 1555. The place was first used as a dry dock (Spanish: varadero) and the salt mines of the peninsula (closed in 1961) supplied most of the Spanish Latin America Fleet since 1587. However, the foundation date of Varadero as city was only on December 5, 1887, when ten families from the city of Cárdenas obtained a permission to build their vacation homes between today's 42nd and 48th Streets. Varadero village came about in the 1880s as a summer resort. The first homes with red roofs made of wood can still be seen along Avenida 1ra.

It was established as a municipality (Spanish: municipio) at the administrative re-distribution of July 3, 1976 from territories previously part of Cárdenas. In August 2010, the Varadero municipality was abolished according to a Law approved by the Cuban National Assembly, becoming again part of the Cárdenas municipality.

== Tourism ==
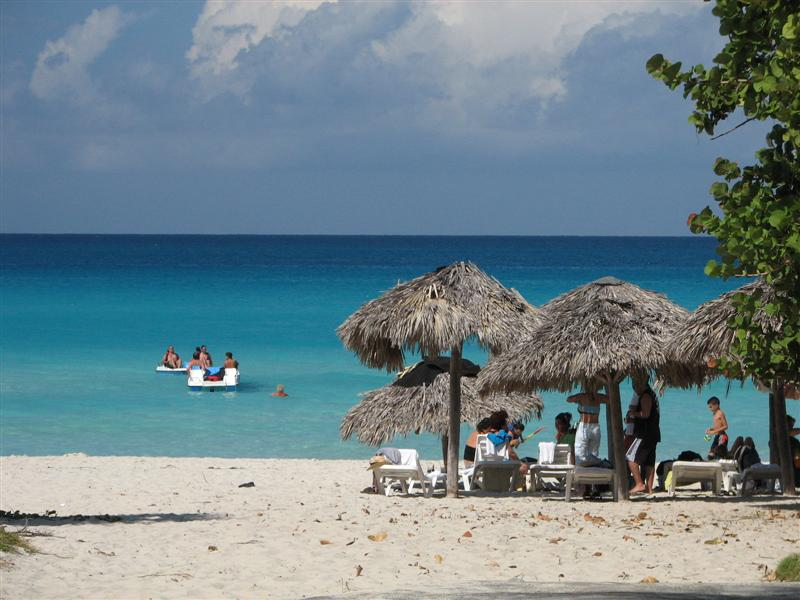
Varadero Beach gets 1 million foreign visitors per year.

Varadero is known as a tourist resort town, with more than 20 km of white sandy beaches. The first tourists visited Varadero as early as the 1870s, and for years it was considered an elite resort. In 1910 the annual rowing regatta was started; five years later the first hotel, named Varadero, which later was renamed Club Nautico, was built. Tourism grew in the early 1930s as Irénée Du Pont de Nemours, an American millionaire, built his estate on the peninsula (now Maison Xanadu or Du Pont House). At Penas de Bernardino People who have stayed in the area include Al Capone.

After the Cuban Revolution in 1959, many mansions were expropriated from their rich owners. These mansions soon became museums. As a symbol of the new integrated tourism for Cubans and foreign visitors of all social classes, the Park of the 8000 Cubicles (Parque de las 8000 Taquillas, Arq. Mario Miguel Girona Fernández) was built in 1960. Visitors could leave their belongings in the basement of the park, had access to sanitary installations and gastronomic services on the first floor, and could rent bathing articles and swimsuits. The surroundings of the park became the center of the city.

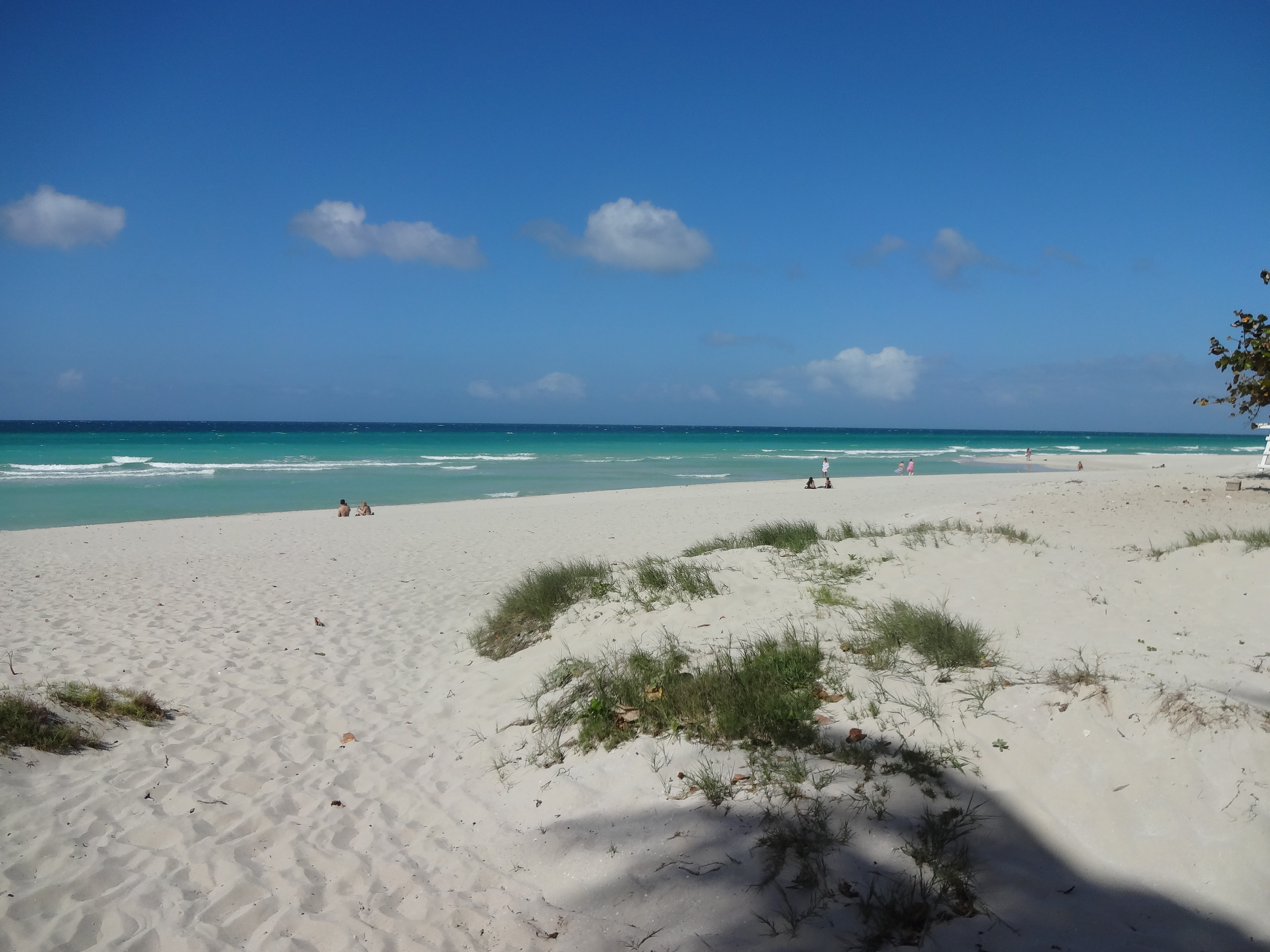
Varadero beach

Between the 1960s and 1980s Varadero transformed itself into a cultural centre. During those years the central park (8000 Taquillas) (located between 44th and 46th Street) saw countless concerts, festivals and sporting events.

The 1990s brought the start of another hotel building campaign, mostly in the 4-star and 5-star segment. Many of the hotels are operated or co-owned by foreign businesses like Meliá, Barceló, TRYP, etc. (France's Club Med used to have a property but has since left Varadero.) As international tourism was opened up, the local population expanded with the arrival of people, some in key economic positions, from other parts of Cuba. As a consequence, Varadero has lost much of its social and cultural life and its traditions. The central park, the cinema and various cultural meeting places were neglected in favor of a hotel-centred all-inclusive-tourism and finally closed. The International Carnival, an initiative of Cubans and foreigners started in the 1980s, also ceased.

In addition to the beach, Varadero has natural attractions such as caves and a chain of easily accessed virgin cays. There are also cultural, historical and environmental attractions in the vicinity, such as the cities of Matanzas and Cárdenas, the Zapata Peninsula and the resort of San Miguel de los Baños. Varadero, which is a free port, also possesses facilities for scuba diving, deep-sea fishing, yachting and other water sports.

Varadero receives more than 1 million tourists annually.

Varadero is primarily visited by European and Canadian tourists. The number of U.S. tourists visiting Varadero, although increasing, has been limited because of the U.S. government restrictions that make it difficult for U.S. citizens to visit Cuba as "tourists", as defined by US rules.

Varadero is home to one of two Canadian Consulates in Cuba.

=== Activities and attractions ===
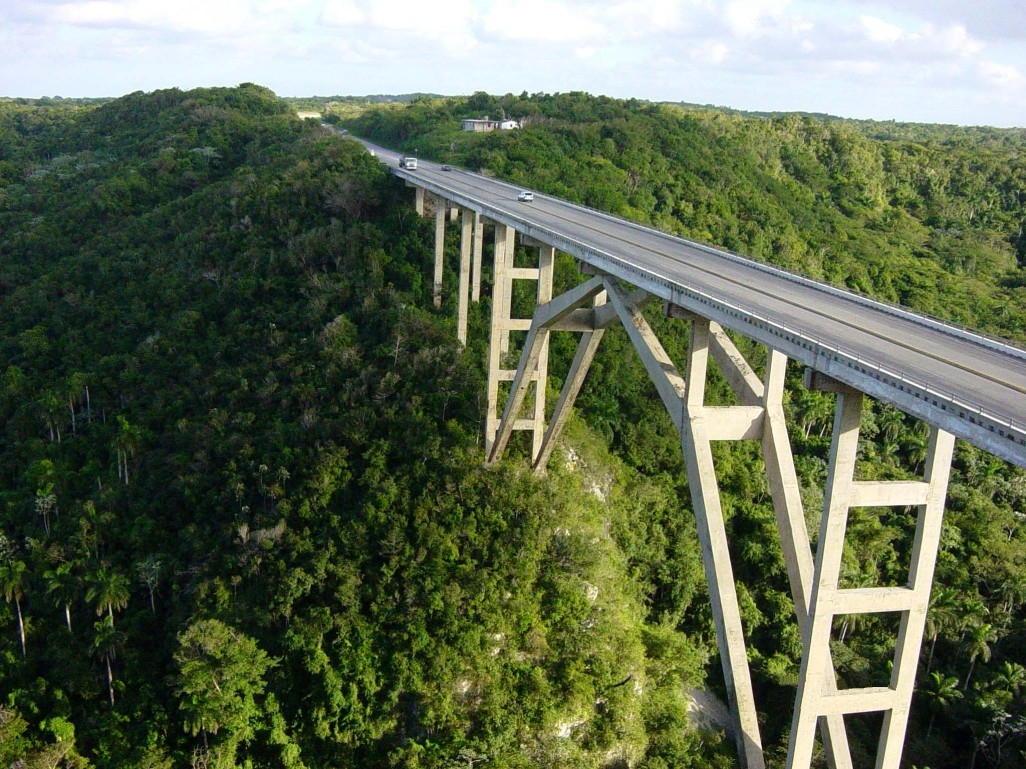
Puente de Bacunayagua bridge, outside Varadero

Varadero hotels offer catamaran cruises with snorkeling and a visit to the dolphin center, Delfinario, a coral-rimmed lagoon located 400 meters east of Marina Chapelín. Swimming and interacting with the dolphins along with dolphin shows are available here. Hotels can also supply kayaks or small boats for their guests. Fishing charts are available at Marlín Náutica y Marinas at Marina Chapelín(1990) and Marina Gaviota Varadero(1961) and Marina Dársena de Varadero(1958). They also have sailboards and kiteboards.

Other attractions in the area include the amusement park Centro Todo En Uno, Puente de Bacunayagua, and an electric-powered Hershey train.

Scuba diving is another attraction in Varadero. There are more than 30 dive sites, such as Parque Marino de Cayo Piedras del Norte, where divers can view a sunken military vessel, "Gran Piedra"(1970) Ship, "Tuxpán-Las Coloradas,(1976) (Coral Negro Ship) and a soviet military AN-24 aircraft, and Ojo de Mégano, which has an underwater cave east of Varadero.

=== Events and festivals ===
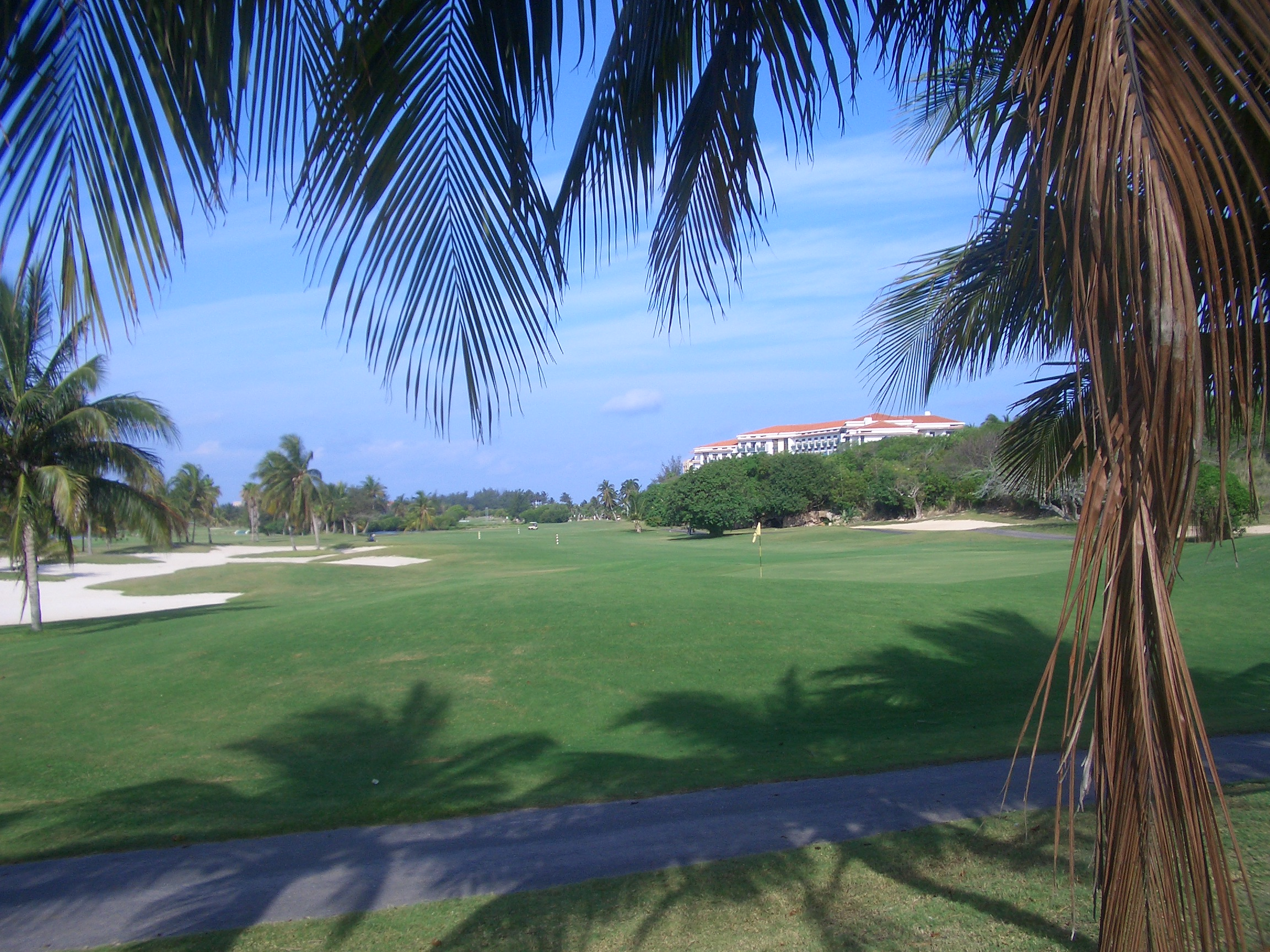
Varadero Golf Club

- Every year, in the month of June, Varadero hosts the "Josone" World Music Festival. Artists come to perform from different parts of Latin America and beyond. Concerts and open-air shows happen in different places of Varadero each year.
- Varadero Gourmet Festival is held annually between April and June.
- A five-day Harley-Davidson motorcycle show and event is held every February, through Harlistas Cubanas (“Cuban Harley-riders”).
- Varadero hosts the Meliá Golf Club Cup event, held annually in the third week of October. It is followed by Los Cactus Varadero Golf Tournament, a two-day tournament held at Hotel Los Cactus’s Varadero Golf Club.

== Sights and landmarks ==
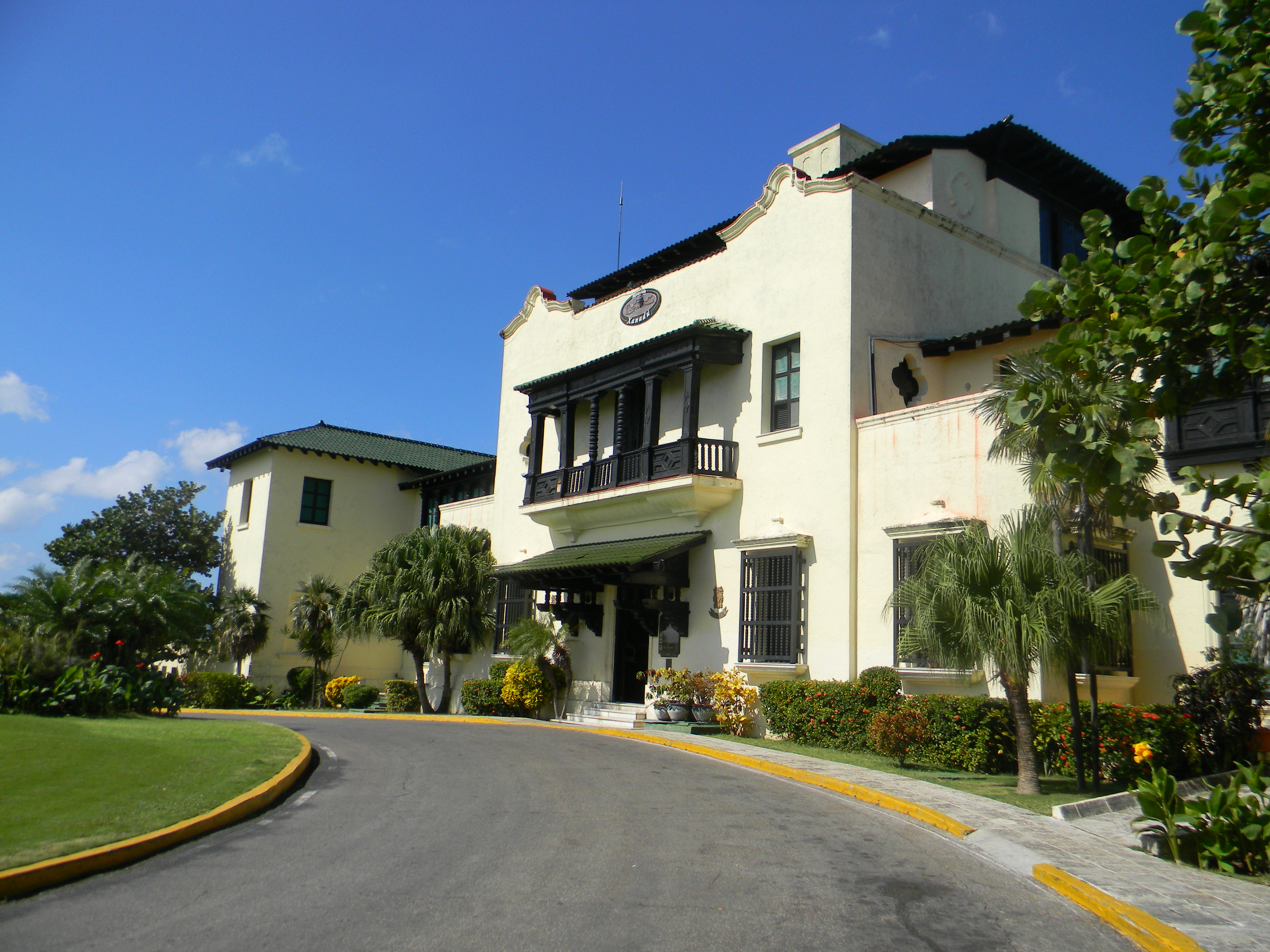
Las Américas (Mansión Xanadú)

- Mansión Xanadu is a hotel and restaurant that was formerly a three-story mansion built by an American millionaire, Irénée Du Pont de Nemours. Govantes & Cabarrocas(1930) Construction on this mansion cost Du Pont $338,000. After the revolution in 1959, Du Pont escaped Cuba and the villa was seized by the Cuban government. In 1963 it was named 'Las Américas', converting it to a luxury restaurant that served French cuisines. The dining room still has original furniture.
- Parque Retiro Josone, located on Avenida Primera y Calle 56, was established in 1942 by José Fermín Iturrioz Llaguno & Onelia Méndez Rubí de Iturrioz, the managing director of the Arechabala Ronera which is the rum factory just outside Cárdenas.
- The Museo Municipal de Varadero located on Calle 57 y Playa. Furniture and history are displayed in what used to be Leopoldo Abreu's summer home in the 1920s.
- Santa Elvira Church, a structure built from stones and wood, is a Catholic church that dates back to 1938. A horseshoe half-arch that ends with a cross located at the top serves as the bell tower.
- Reserva Ecológica Varahicacos (1996) "Varahicacos " is located at the island's east end of the peninsula near Punta Hicacos and provides 730 acres, which has long trails that lead to different caves. Cueva de Ambrosio, discovered in the 1960s (Dr. Manuel Fermín Rivero de La Calle and Mario Orlando Pariente Pérez) has Indian drawings along with 47 pre-Columbian symbols that are more than 3,000 years old. Cueva de los Musulmanes (Cave of Muslims) is located on a second trail. It was once used as an indigenous tomb.
- Playa de Varadero (Varadero Beach).
- Cueva de Ambrosio (Ambrosio Cave). The cave contains, across its 300 meters, around 47 Pre-Columbian paintings.
- Dolphinarium.

== Demographics ==
In 2007, the municipality of Varadero had a population of about 20,000 between the Hicacos peninsula (7,000) and the two incorporated localities of Santa Marta and Boca de Camarioca. With a total area of 32 km^{2} (12 sq mi), it has a population density of 771.3/km^{2} (1,998/sq mi). Many of the workers in the tourist sector commute from Cardenas.

== Notable people ==
- José Miranda (b. 1986), Cuban-born American footballer
- Leonel "Bebito" Smith (1909–2000), swimmer
- Rafael Polinario (1959–2017), swimmer
- J. R. Ramirez (b. 1980), Cuban born American actor
- Amalia Aguilar (1924–2021), Cuban-born Mexican actress and dancer
- Martin Fox, Cuban gangster who built a beach front house in the area.

== Transportation ==
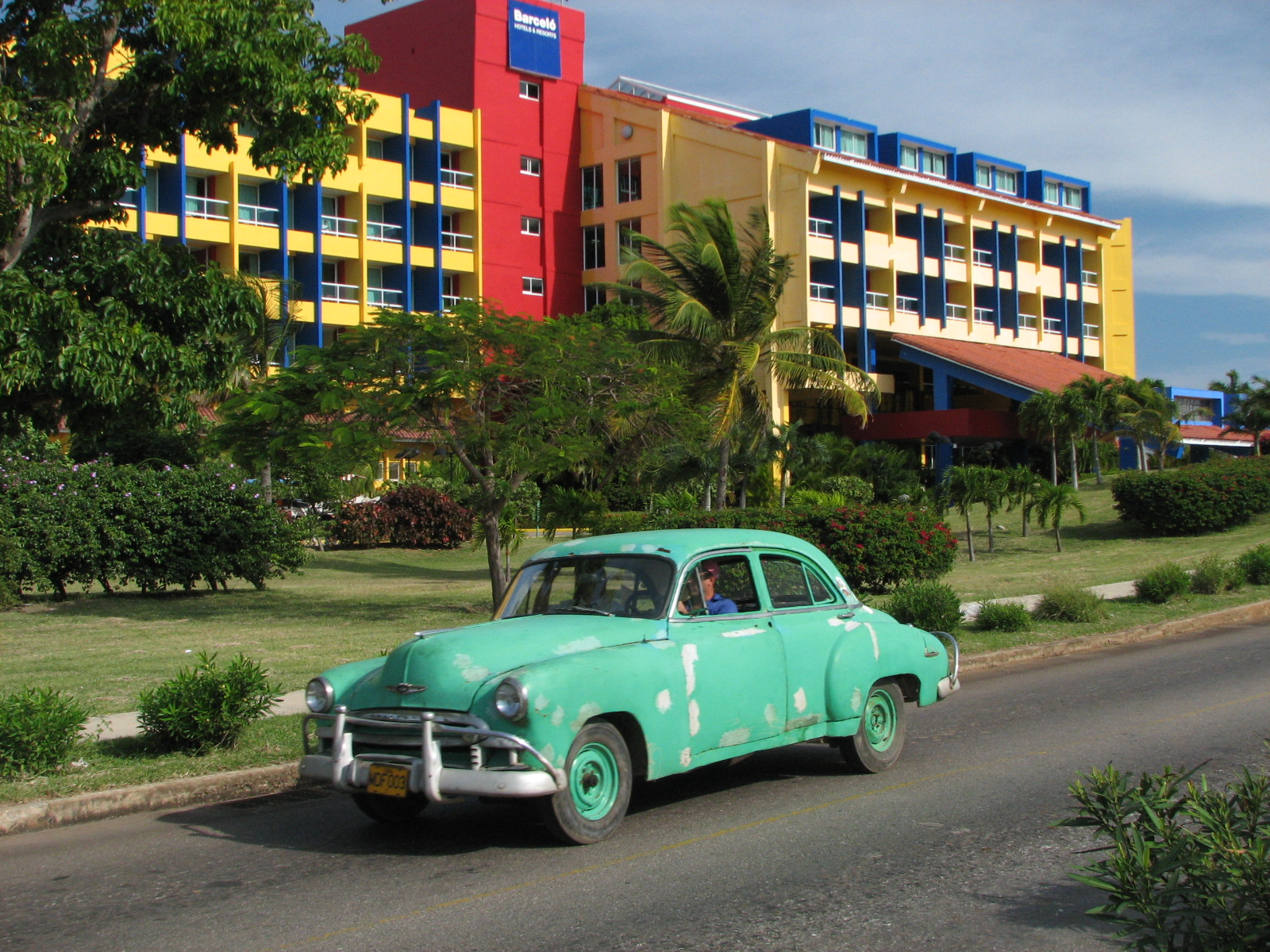
Yank tank or "Almendron" at Varadero in November 2007.

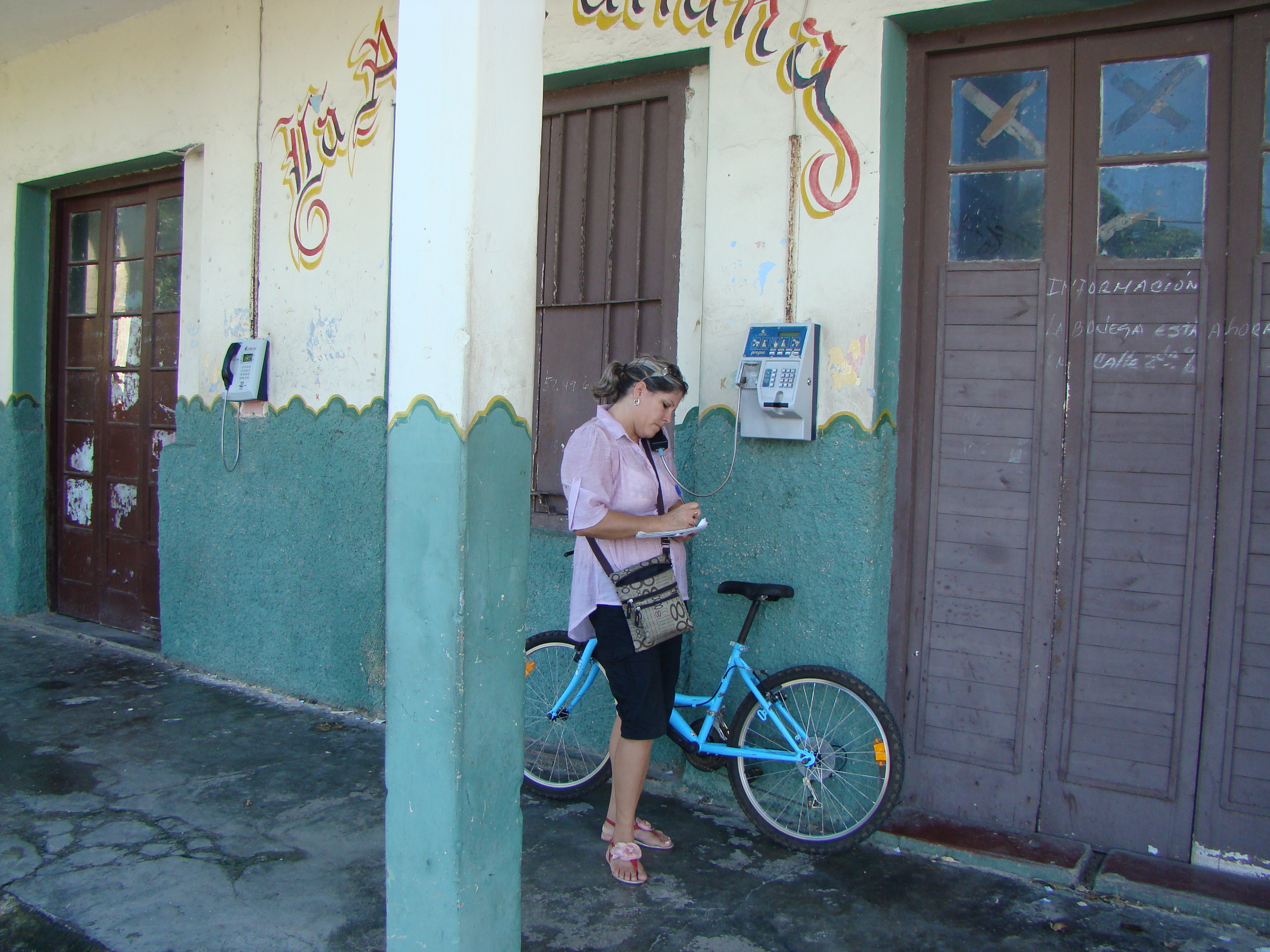
Cuban woman using a payphone, 2012

=== Air ===
Varadero is served by Juan Gualberto Gómez Airport, 1989 and Kawama Airport, 1950.

=== Roads ===
The main road is Autopista Sur, which begins before crossing the bridge over Laguna Paso Malo and ends 19.4 kilometres (12.1 mi) at a cul de sac at Barceló Marina Palace. Traffic from Vía Blanca and Carretera a into the Barceló Marina Palace merges into Varadero on this road near Kawama Airport. The paved highway has two lanes in both directions for most of the route, but a portion is closed off reducing it to only a single lane in each direction. Side roads cross this road as regular intersections with only a partial cloverleaf at Laguna Paso Malo.

The main street is Avenida Primera (1ra) and runs along the oceanfront from Calle 8 in the west to Calle 64 in the East. In the Kawama suburb cross streets begin at Calle 1 and run eastward to Calle 64. Farther east the streets become lettered beginning with Calle A to L.(Reparto La Torre, Du Pont Between Calles 23 and 54 you will find the old village.

=== Bus operators ===
There are several bus operators, some providing connections from resorts to town and others as public transit operators within the main town.

== See also ==
- List of cities in Cuba
- Municipalities of Cuba
