= Ambrosio Cave, Spain =

Natural Monument and archaeological site in Almería, Spain

Coordinates: 37.8323°N 2.0967°W

Ambrosio Cave
- Cueva de Ambrosio
- IUCN category III (natural monument or feature)
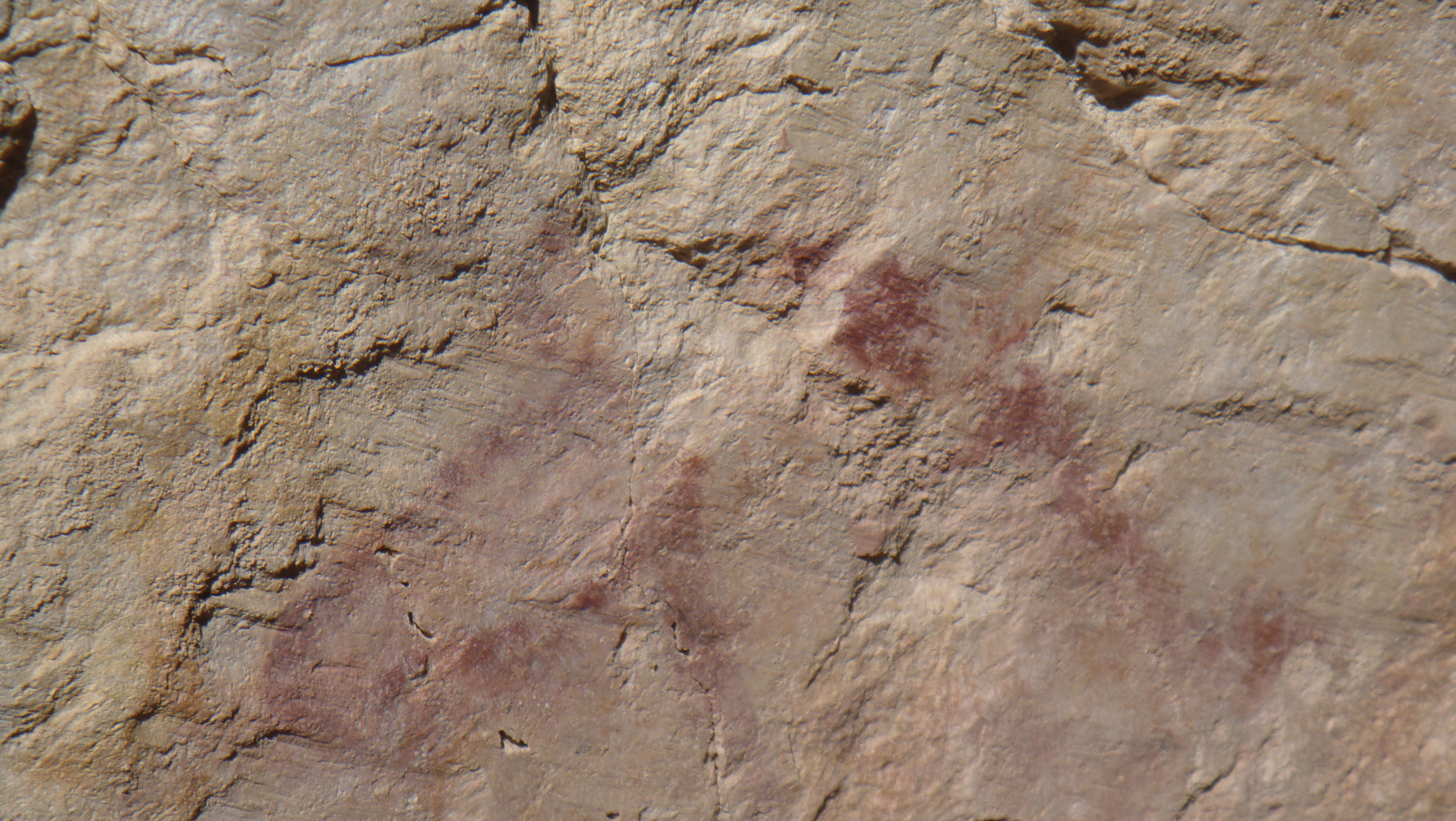
- A cave painting of a horse in red ochre
- Interactive map of Ambrosio Cave
- Location: Spain
- World Heritage site: 1998

The Ambrosio Cave Natural Monument (in Spanish: Cueva de Ambrosio) is an archeological site classified as a natural monument in the Province of Almería, Spain. It is situated at the northern edge of the Vélez-Blanco municipality and is classified among the Natural Monuments of Andalusia. It protects the surroundings of the Ambrosio cave, a rock shelter measuring 38 meters wide, 18 meters high, and up to 17 meters deep, where remains from the Paleolithic period have been found. The shelter opens onto a nearly 100-meter-high cliff, oriented east-west above the Moral stream, and is formed by limestone from the upper Burdigalian to lower Langhian geological stages. It is one of the most significant Paleolithic sites in southeastern Iberia due to its extensive stratigraphy, which documents layers from the Upper Paleolithic, including the Solutrean period, through the Epipaleolithic and Neolithic periods, up to recent prehistory. The cultural sequence from the Upper Paleolithic and Epipaleolithic is particularly noteworthy.

The shelter has been designated a World Heritage Site since 1998 as part of the Rock Art of the Mediterranean Basin on the Iberian Peninsula (ref. 874-069).

== Description ==
Known since the early 20th century and extensively studied as an archaeological site through numerous campaigns, the cave's parietal art was not discovered until the 1990s. In recent years, significant Paleolithic engravings and rock paintings have been uncovered. A particularly important discovery occurred in 1992, revealing numerous artistic expressions, both engraved and painted, grouped into three panels. Panel I is located in the outer area of the shelter, on the same wall, 4.5 meters from the entrance. It consists of exclusively incised representations, totaling five figures: a fusiform bird, a right-facing equid with a nearly right-angled cervico-dorsal line, and two less-defined equids.

Panel II, located further inside, was hidden beneath a thick layer of intact sediment and blocks from uncontrolled excavations. It features a complex set of engraved lines and two red patches. A standout feature is a splendid painted horse (92 cm by 37 cm from the ears to the chest line, and 53 cm wide from the hindquarters to the rear). The head shows one ear and a fragment of the other, with a jawline inflection that does not fully take on the characteristic duck-bill shape. The rear part of the front leg, the belly line, and the hindquarters are missing. In the upper corner of the panel, two engraved horse protomes facing each other have been identified, along with another finely engraved horse representation. Additionally, traces of three other horse heads and some black patches are present.

Panel III is located on a heavily weathered whitish surface and contains three faded pictorial groups of limited representativeness.

== Boundaries ==
The site's boundaries are defined by the walls of the shelter, which opens east-west in its southern part above the Moral stream. The site is enclosed by a protective fence situated on the escarpment overlooking the stream.

== See also ==
- List of caves

=== Researchers ===
- Henri Breuil
- Juan Cabré
- Luis Pericot Garcia
- Eduardo Ripoll Perelló
- Sergio Ripoll López

=== Related Solutrean sites ===
- Cuevas de la Lluera
- Cueva de los Casares

=== Other ===
- Chronology of the Iberian Peninsula's prehistory

== Notes ==
This article incorporates material from the Resolution of May 21, 1986, of the Directorate General of Fine Arts, which agreed to initiate the procedure for declaring an archaeological zone as a cultural heritage site in favor of the Cueva de Ambrosio, located in the municipality of Vélez-Blanco (Almería), published in BOJA No. 61 on April 24, 2006, which is in the public domain.
