= Ambrosio Cave, Cuba =

Cave in Cuba with prehistorical drawings

Coordinates: 23.192618°N 81.1629444°W

Cueva de Ambrosio, Cuba

The Ambrosio Cave (Cueva de Ambrosio) is an archeological site with pre-Columbian drawings within the Varahicacos Ecological Reserve by Varadero, Cuba.

The drawings in the cave were discovered on 29 August 1961 by archaeologists Manuel Rivero de la Calle and Mario Orlando Pariente Pérez. Their origins and meaning are still discussed among the experts.

The cave stretches over 300 metres across five galleries and contains 47 pictographs and 71 red-and-black drawings. In 1968, the restoration of the artwork was undertaken.
