= Hurricanes in the Lucayan Archipelago =

Tropical cyclones affecting the Lucayan Archipelago

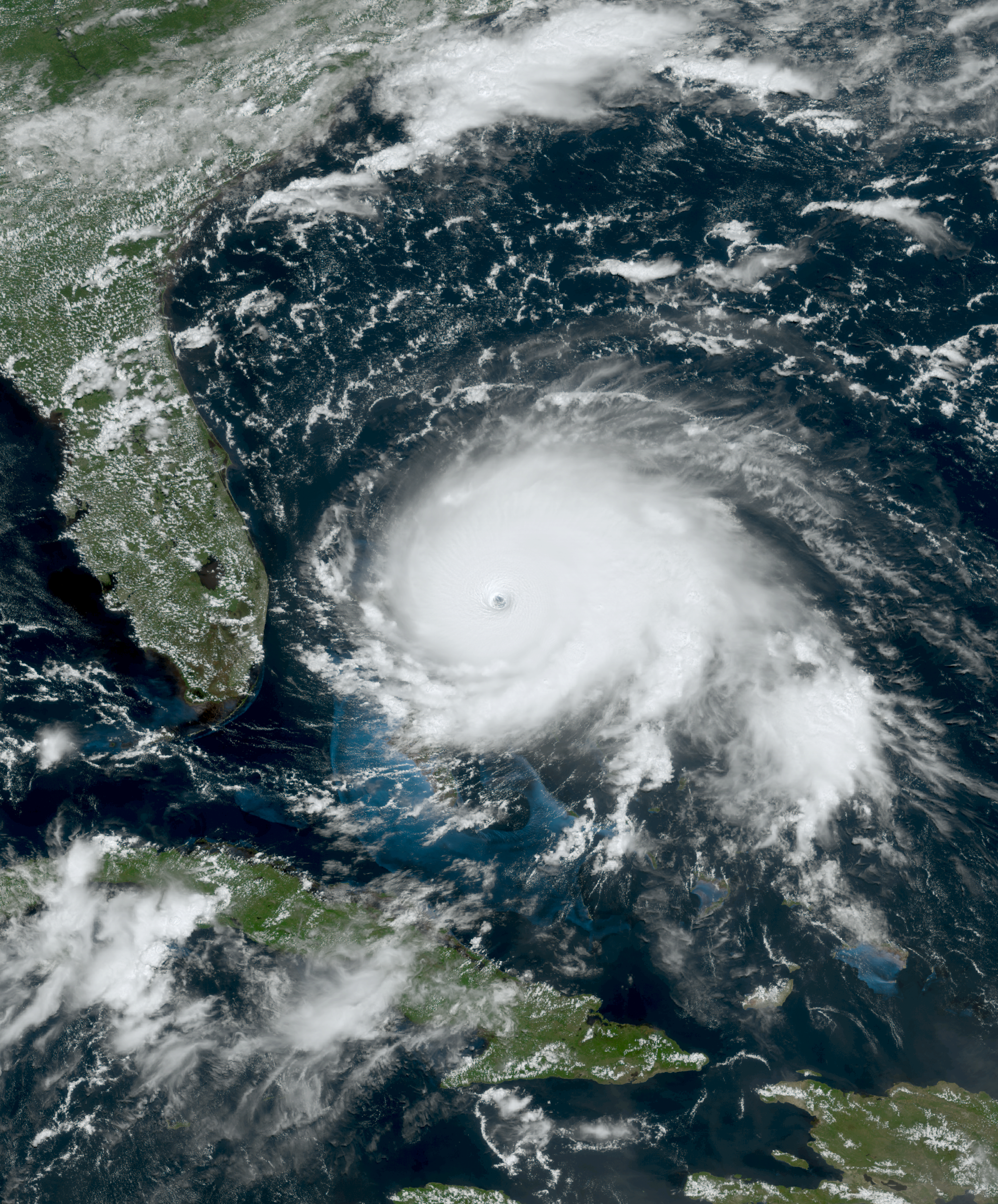
Hurricane Dorian at peak intensity while making landfall in the Abaco Islands on 1 September 2019

The Lucayan Archipelago, also known as the Bahama Archipelago, is an archipelago comprising the Commonwealth of The Bahamas and the British Overseas Territory of the Turks and Caicos Islands. The archipelago is in the western North Atlantic Ocean, north of Cuba along with the other Antilles, and east and southeast of Florida. The archipelago has experienced the effects of at least 22 Atlantic hurricanes, or storms that were once tropical or subtropical cyclones, including 17 since 2000. The storms collectively killed 101 people.

Hurricane Dorian in 2019 was the strongest hurricane on record to strike the Bahamas, with one-minute maximum sustained winds of 185 mph (298 km/h), causing $2.5 billion in damage and at least 74 deaths. Dorian was one of four Category 5 hurricanes to strike the Bahamas, the others being the 1932 Bahamas hurricane, the 1933 Cuba–Brownsville hurricane, and Hurricane Andrew in 1992. The most recent hurricane to traverse the archipelago was Hurricane Melissa in 2025.

== Pre-1900s ==
- 26 September 1852 − The Great Mobile hurricane hits the southernmost portion of the archipelago as a minimal hurricane. Damage is unknown.
- October 1853 − Hurricane Eight passes north of the Bahaman archipelago, killing 12 people in the islands.
- September 1866 − Major Hurricane Six makes landfall at the Bahaman archipelago, killing 348 people in the islands.
- 15 August 1871 − A major hurricane strikes the northernmost part of the archipelago, killing 23 people.

== 1900s ==
- 15–16 September 1928 − The 1928 Okeechobee hurricane causes 21 fatalities in the archipelago.
- 5 September 1932 − The 1932 Bahamas Hurricane strikes Great Abaco Island as a Category 5. Damage in Nassau, despite being just 65 miles from the hurricane, is minimal. However, on Great Abaco Island, winds of up to 160 mph (260 km/h) battered the island. At nearby Hope Town, a pressure of 921 mbar (27.2 inHg) was recorded, and 83 homes were destroyed while another 63 were severely damaged. At Green Turtle Cay, a large storm surge inundated the entire island, flooding homes, churches, and businesses. At Green Turtle Cay alone, six people died while another 25 were injured. Multiple vessels to the north of Abaco Island also reported low pressure, one even reporting 936 mbar (27.6 inHg) while another vessel recorded 934 mbar (27.6 inHg).
- 29 August 1933 − The 1933 Cuba–Brownsville hurricane moves over the southeastern Bahamas and Turks and Caicos Islands as a brief Category 5, with winds of 160 mph. The radius of hurricane-strength winds was small, as Grand Turk Island reported winds of only 56 mph. A ship near Mayaguana recorded a pressure of 930 millibars (27 inHg), however, the ship was not in the eye of the hurricane.
- 6–8 September 1965 − Hurricane Betsy smashes the northern Bahamian islands as a high-end Category 4 hurricane, with one station in Green Turtle Cay recording winds clocked at 151 mph (243 km/h). Another station in Hope Town recorded a gust of 178 mph (286 km/h). Two luxury yachts were destroyed, while dozens of smaller boats were damaged. A man was killed in Nassau after his ship capsized at Nassau Harbor. In the Bay Street shopping district, 10 ft (3.0 m) of water flooded the street. Many power lines and trees were blown down as a result of the strong winds, and many homes and businesses were damaged or destroyed. As a result of the strong winds, rain, and storm surge, $14 million (1965 USD) of damage was estimated, most of it being crop damage.
- 2–5 October 1966 − Hurricane Inez stalls in The Bahamas, bringing with it heavy rainfall. In Nassau alone, 14.31 in (363 mm) of rain is dropped while in Green Turtle Cay, Abaco, 9.82 in (249 mm) of rain is dropped. A tornado also formed in Nassau, killing a 15-month-old child, and injuring two others. It was rated an EF1, with winds of over 100 mph (160 km/h) being reported from an anemoter near the tornado. However, the strongest winds in the Bahamas directly linked to the hurricane was in West End, Grand Bahama where winds got to 90 mph (140 km/h). Overall, five people died and around $15.5 million (1966 USD) of damage was caused.
- 29 May 1969 − Tropical Depression 5 tracks over the Abaco Islands. No impact is reported.
- 20–22 October 1973 − Tropical Storm Gilda stalls south of the Abaco Islands, bringing heavy rainfall and winds to the islands forcing businesses and schools to close. Peak wind gusts were about 75 mph (121 km/h) on Golden Cay. There was some reported crop damage, but the overall losses are minor and nobody was killed.
- 2 September 1979 − Hurricane David rolls through the Bahamas as a Category 1–2, as it had brought strong winds of 70–80 mph (110–130 km/h) to places such as Andros Island. It also brought heavy rainfall to The Bahamas peaking at 8 inches (200 mm). Even with the rainfall and winds, the overall damage in The Bahamas is minor.
- 26 September 1984 − Tropical Storm Isidore moves through the Bahamas before striking Florida, bring gusty conditions and heavy rainfall to the islands. In Nassau, floods and gales close businesses, schools and banks across the island. Even with the floods and gusty winds overall damage is minor and nobody is killed.

=== 1990−1999 ===
- 24 August 1992 − Hurricane Andrew strikes Eleuthera with 160 mph winds (260 km/h) and early the next day passes through the southern Berry Islands with 150 mph winds (240 km/h). The storm causes $250 million worth of damage (1992 USD, $461 million in 2019 USD), with the most damage on Eleuthera and Cat Cays. 4 people were also killed in The Bahamas, with one of them being an indirect death.
- 23–24 September 1998 − Hurricane Georges passed to the south of the archipelago, though forecasts from National Hurricane Center showed the storm making landfall in the archipelago while the storm was farther away. Georges brought 70 mph (110 km/h) winds to Turks and Caicos Islands and South Andros, as well as precipitation in the storm's outer bands. Though damage was minimal, one person died in the country.
- 28 August 1999 − Hurricane Dennis strikes the Abaco Islands as a Category 1 hurricane, causing winds of 40 mph (64 km/h) to strike Grand Bahama Island, with other areas recording winds of 70–75 mph (113–121 km/h). The strong winds caused widespread power outages as storm surge was pushed in, flooding roads and buildings. Trees were also downed or severely damaged as the storms center moved across the Abaco Islands. There were no deaths or injuries and the damage total is unknown.
- 1 September 1999 − Hurricane Floyd lashed the Bahamas with winds of 155 mph (249 km/h) and waves up to 50 ft (15 m) in height. A 20 ft (6.10 m) storm surge inundated many islands with over five ft (1.5 m) of water throughout. The wind and waves toppled power and communication lines, severely disrupting electricity and telephone services for days. Damage was greatest at Abaco Island, Cat Island, San Salvador Island, and Eleuthera Island, where Floyd uprooted trees and destroyed a significant number of houses. Numerous restaurants, hotels, shops, and homes were devastated, severely limiting in the recovery period tourism on which many rely for economic well-being. Damaged water systems left tens of thousands across the archipelago without water, electricity, or food. Despite the damage, few deaths and injuries were reported, as only one person drowned in Freeport.

== 2000s ==
=== 2000−2009 ===
- 5 November 2001 − Hurricane Michelle weakened before hitting the Bahamas, bringing high winds and flooding. At its peak, almost 200,000 customers were without power as many trees fell down from strong winds. In Nassau, almost 12.64 inches of rainfall fell down, and, in New Providence Island, 5–8 feet of storm surge was pushed in. Overall, Michelle caused an estimated $300 million in damage (2001 USD), but there were no reported deaths.
- 7 August 2002 − Tropical Storm Cristobal brought showers and gusty winds to the northern islands of The Bahamas. Two ships recorded tropical storm force winds in association with the storm; one of them, a vessel with the call sign WUQL, reported sustained winds of 47 mph (76 km/h) from the west-southwest on 7 August while located about 160 mi (260 km) northeast of Great Abaco.
- 13 August 2003 − Hurricane Erika's precursor disturbance dropped heavy, yet needed rainfall to northwestern islands of The Bahamas.
- 7 September 2003 − Tropical Storm Henri's outer rainbands dropped around 1 inch (25 mm) of rain. Winds in the archipelago gusted to 32 mph (51 km/h).
- 15–18 September 2003 − Hurricane Isabel caused strong swells that lashed the Bahamas. During most hurricanes, the location of the Bahamas prevents powerful swells of Atlantic hurricanes from striking southeast Florida. However, the combination of the location, forward speed, and strength of Isabel produced strong swells through the Providence Channel. Wave heights peaked at 14 feet (4.3 m).
- 11 October 2003 − Tropical Storm Mindy passed over the Turks and Caicos Islands on 11 October, causing some rain and squally weather. Mindy had weakened to a tropical depression, as winds reached only 31 mph (50 km/h) at Grand Turk Island.
- 2 September 2004 − Hurricane Frances roars through the Bahamas as a Category 3, being the first storm since 1866 to impact the entire Bahama Archipelago. At its peak, around 75% of people living in the Bahamas lost power. On San Salvador Island in the Bahamas, between 13 and 17 percent of Australian Pine was lost, most because of snapping. Almost several feet of water was reported in the Freeport International Airport and many crops, including the banana and cool-season vegetables were destroyed.
- 1 November 2007 − Hurricane Noel moves through as a tropical storm, dropping heavy rainfall and bringing gusty winds. At one station in the Bahamas, almost 15 inches (380 mm) of rain was recorded while there were sustained winds up to 40 mph through central and northwestern parts of the Bahamas. The worst damage was reported in Long Island with floods up to 5 feet high. There was one death on Exuma when a man abandoned his truck and was then swept away.

=== 2010−2019 ===
- 17 July 2011 − Tropical Storm Bret passes around 100 miles north of Grand Bahama Island, prompting tropical storm warnings for the northwestern Bahamas. On Abaco Island, a weather station recorded a tropical storm force gust up to 48 miles per hour (77 km/h). 3 inches of rain was recorded from 16 to 17 July. Impacts were relatively minor, and a drought plaguing the island was relieved by the rainfall.
- 25 August 2011 − Hurricane Irene struck the southeastern Bahamas along with the Turks and Caicos Islands. In the Turks and Caicos, the storm hit as a Category 1 hurricane, downing power lines and ripping off roofs. In the Bahamas, the storm made landfall as a Category 3, with the eye passing over several Bahamian Islands. The peak wind gust was clocked at nearly 140 mph and the heaviest rain was about 13 inches (330 mm). Winds damaged dozens of buildings, while in Lovely Bay almost 90 percent of all buildings were wiped out. The worst of the damage was reported to be in Cat Cay. The overall damage was around $40 million (2011 USD, $46 million 2020 USD), though there were no fatalities or injuries reported.
- 1 October 2015 − Hurricane Joaquin struck the southeastern Bahamas as a Category 4 hurricane. It was one of the strongest known hurricanes to impact the Bahamas, with effects comparable to Hurricane Andrew in 1992. Joaquin directly affected about 7,000 people in the archipelago, with 836 houses destroyed; this included 413 on Long Island, 227 on San Salvador, 123 on Acklins, 50 on Crooked Island, and 23 on Rum Cay. One man died during the storm on Long Island, his death was unrelated to the hurricane. Joaquin left about $200 million in damage across the Bahamian archipelago.
- 7 October 2016 − Hurricane Matthew passed through the Bahamas, making a direct landfall on Grand Bahama. Strong winds took down trees and an estimated 95% percent of houses were severely damaged in Eight Mile Rock and Holmes Rock. On the backside of the hurricane, heavy rainfall flooded the Bahamas, damaging roads. Total damage is about $580 million in damage (2016 USD), but no deaths or injuries were reported.
- 7 September 2017 − Hurricane Irma passed south of the Turks and Caicos Islands before hitting The Bahamas. Winds took out power over the Turks and Caicos, with communication infrastructure destroyed. On South Caicos, over 75% of buildings had lost their roofs, while the hospital in the capital of Cockburn Town was heavily damaged. In the Bahamas, the eye passed over Duncan Town, Inagua and South Acklin. Most damages were confined to Great Inagua and Mayaguana with power lines knocked down. On Crooked Island, Bahamas there was widespread roof damage, and outer rain bands caused tornadoes on Grand Bahama. Overall, damage was $635 million in damage (2017 USD).
- 22 July 2019 − Tropical Depression Three moved across Andros Island shortly after its formation. The depression dropped locally heavy rainfall, reaching 1.53 in (39 mm) in Freeport.

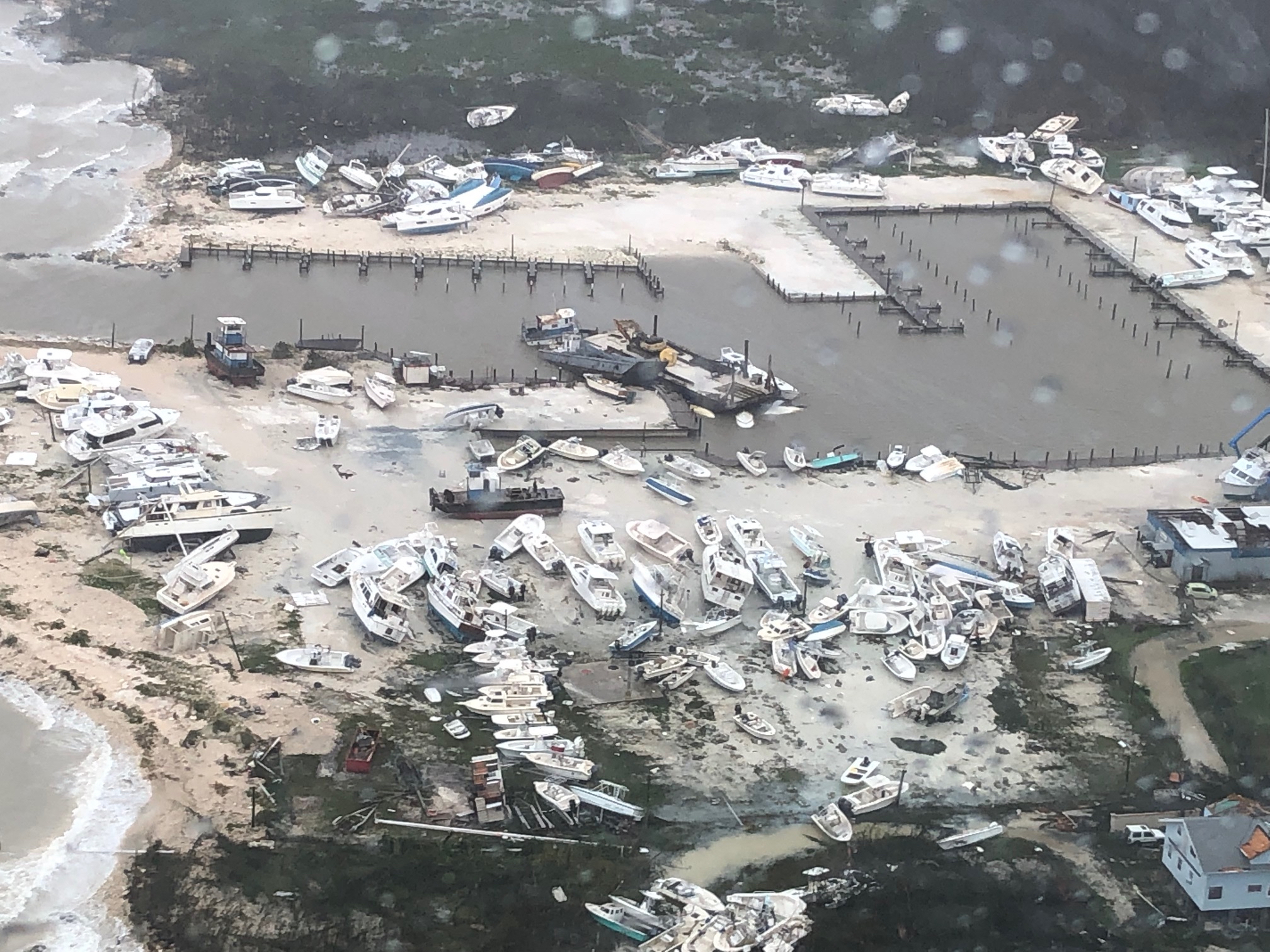
Hurricane Dorian's destruction in the Bahamas

- 1 September 2019 − Hurricane Dorian struck Elbow Cay on Great Abaco as a Category 5 hurricane, with one-minute sustained winds of 185 mph (298 km/h), wind gusts over 220 mph (355 km/h), and a central barometric pressure of 910 millibars (27 inHg). This made Dorian the first Category 5 hurricane to strike the Bahamas since 1992, and the strongest hurricane on record to strike the country. After nearly stalling over the country, Dorian struck Grand Bahama Island near South Riding on 2 September with winds of 180 mph (290 km/h). Dorian's storm surge flooded areas 20 ft (6.1 m) deep while also dropping heavy rainfall. Precipitation reached 22.84 in (0.580 m) at Hope Town. Dorian killed at least 74 people, with another 245 missing as of April 2020. Property damage accounted for $2.5 billion; the nation suffered $717 million in economic losses; and $221 million was required for debris removal and cleaning a large oil spill.
- 14 September 2019 − Hurricane Humberto passed just northeast of the Bahamas as a tropical storm, only two weeks after Dorian devastated the country. Grand Bahama International Airport reported ten-minute sustained winds of just 29 mph (47 km/h) as the storm passed to the east, and rainfall totals were light. Humberto's proximity to the disaster area caused small airfields being used in the distribution of emergency supplies to be closed briefly.

=== 2020−present ===
- 16 May 2020 − Tropical Storm Arthur formed just north of Grand Bahama Island. Gusty winds damaged tents and other temporary shelters across the island, and heavy rainfall caused some minimal flooding.
- 1 August 2020 − Hurricane Isaias made landfall in Northern Andros Island at wind speeds of 80 mph (130 km/h). The storm caused moderate damage to property, namely storm surge and wind damage to trees and roofs. A few tents and temporary shelters were destroyed.
- 11 September 2020 − Hurricane Sally forms as a tropical depression over Andros Island, bringing strong wind gusts and heavy rain.
- 9–10 November 2022 − Hurricane Nicole makes landfall on Abaco Island as a strong tropical storm. Hours later, it makes landfall on Grand Bahama as a minimal hurricane with wind speeds of 75 mph (121 km/h).
- 20 October 2024 − Hurricane Oscar passes just to the south of Great Inagua as a minimal Category 1 hurricane.
- 29 October 2025 − Hurricane Melissa passes very near Long Island as a Category 1 hurricane.

== Climatology ==
Storms affecting the Bahama Archipelago by month
Month	Number of storms
May	2
July	2
August	8
September	15
October	8
November	3

Storms affecting the Bahama Archipelago by period
Period	Number of storms
1800s	4
1900–49	3
1960s	3
1970s	2
1980s	1
1990s	4
2000s	8
2010s	8
2020s	6

== Deadly storms ==
The following is a list of Atlantic tropical storms that caused fatalities in the Bahama Archipelago.

Name	Year	Number of deaths	Source
"Great Nassau"	1866	387+	
"San Ciriaco"	1899	~334	
"Nassau"	1926	258–68+	
"Great Andros"	1929	142	
"Miami"	1926	~123	
Three	1883	109	
Eight	1908	99	
"Florida Keys"	1919	≥94–5	
Dorian	2019	74 (245 missing)	
Six	1908	58+	

== See also ==
- Effects of Hurricane Dorian in The Bahamas
- List of Cuba hurricanes
- List of Cayman Islands hurricanes
- List of Jamaica hurricanes
- List of Hispaniola hurricanes
- List of Florida hurricanes

== Sources ==
- Mitchell, Charles L. (September 1928). "The West Indian Hurricane of September 10–20, 1928" (PDF). Monthly Weather Review. 56 (9): 347–350. Bibcode:1928MWRv...56..347M. doi:10.1175/1520-0493(1928)56<347:TWIHOS>2.0.CO;2. Archived (PDF) from the original on 26 March 2014.
- Neely, Wayne (2009). The Great Bahamian Hurricanes of 1926: the Story of Three of the Greatest Hurricanes to Ever Affect the Bahamas. New York City: iUniverse. ISBN 978-1-4401-5174-3 – via Google Books.
- Neely, Wayne (2014). The Great Okeechobee Hurricane of 1928. Bloomington, Indiana: iUniverse. ISBN 978-1-4917-5446-7 – via Google Books.
- Neely, Wayne (2019). The Greatest and Deadliest Hurricanes to Impact the Bahamas. Cheyenne, Wyoming: UrLink. ISBN 978-1-64753-121-8.
- Partagás, José Fernández; Díaz, H. F. (1995). "A Reconstruction of Historical Tropical Cyclone Frequency in the Atlantic from Documentary and other Historical Sources, Part I: 1851-1870". Year 1853 (PDF) (Report). Boulder, Colorado: Climate Diagnostics Center. pp. 25–6.
