= 1932 Abaco hurricane =

Category 5 Atlantic hurricane in 1932

Hurricane Four
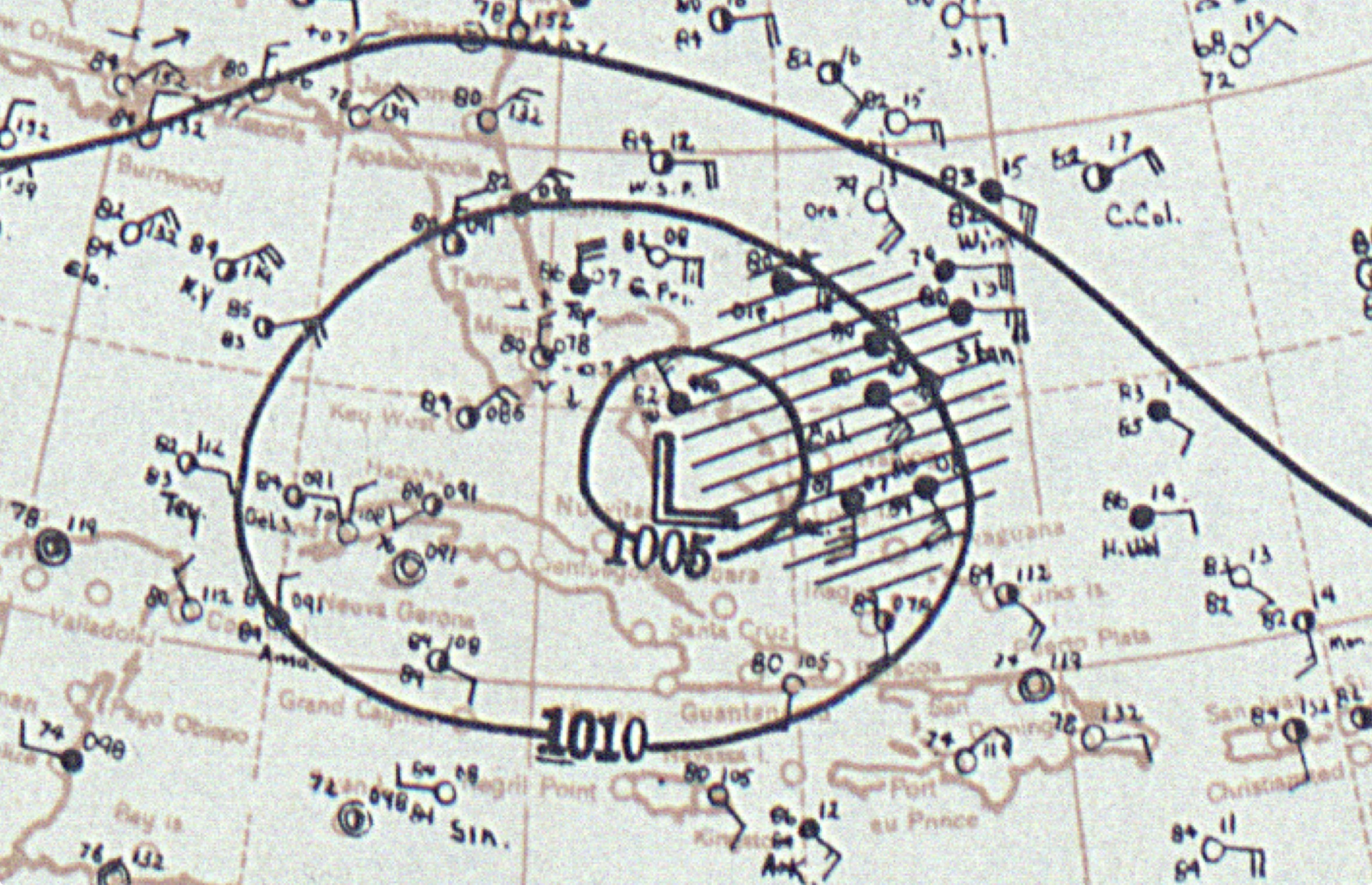
- Surface weather map of the hurricane near peak intensity while over the Bahamas on September 5

Meteorological history
- Formed: August 30, 1932
- Extratropical: September 9, 1932
- Dissipated: September 17, 1932

Category 5 major hurricane
- 1-minute sustained (SSHWS/NWS)
- Highest winds: 160 mph (260 km/h)
- Highest gusts: 200 mph (320 km/h) (estimated)
- Lowest pressure: ≤931 mbar (hPa); ≤27.49 inHg

Overall effects
- Fatalities: 37–38 direct
- Damage: >$33,800 (1932 USD)
- Areas affected: British Bahamas; Bermuda; East Coast of the United States; Saint Pierre and Miquelon; Atlantic Canada; Iceland; Jan Mayen
- IBTrACS
- Part of the 1932 Atlantic hurricane season

The 1932 Abaco hurricane (Note: Named after the site of its worst effects, which it hit at peak intensity. Atlantic tropical storms were formally unnamed before World War II. Older storms were denoted by their attributes, such as occurrence on Catholic feast days.) was a potent Atlantic hurricane that impacted portions of the Lucayan Archipelago in the Caribbean, inflicting severe damage. One of four Category 5 hurricanes to make landfall in the Bahamas at that intensity, (Note: The apex of the five-level Saffir–Simpson scale, with maximum sustained winds of 157 miles per hour (253 kilometres per hour) or higher for a one-minute period at 33 feet (10 metres) above ground.) it was the first of two to do so on the Abaco Islands. The fourth tropical storm, third hurricane, and first of two Category 5 storms (Note: The other happening in November) during the annual season, it formed north of the Virgin Islands on August 30 and slowly intensified over the next three days. It became a hurricane on September 2 and a major hurricane (Note: Rated Category 3 and above on the Saffir–Simpson scale) two days later. On September 5, it peaked with winds of 160 mph (260 km/h) and crossed the northern Bahamas; it killed 18 people and injured 300 there. Strong winds and storm surge swept the islands, leveling hundreds of homes, roads, and crops.

The storm prompted the United States Weather Bureau to issue storm warnings from South Florida to Maine, but missed the United States. By September 8, it weakened to below Category 3 status, threading Bermuda and the northeastern United States. On the next day, it lost tropical features. Its remnants brushed the Maritimes, Iceland, and northern Scandinavia, ending near northwestern Russia on September 17. Due to its large size, the storm spread gusty winds, high surf, and flooding from Florida to Bermuda and Atlantic Canada. Across Canadian waters, 14 or 15 people died, and five more drowned in the northeastern United States. Wind gusts felled buildings in Canada, along with vegetation and light items such as signs in both nations. The storm caused severe beach erosion as far south as the Carolinas and snarled shipping as far as Iceland.

== Meteorological history ==
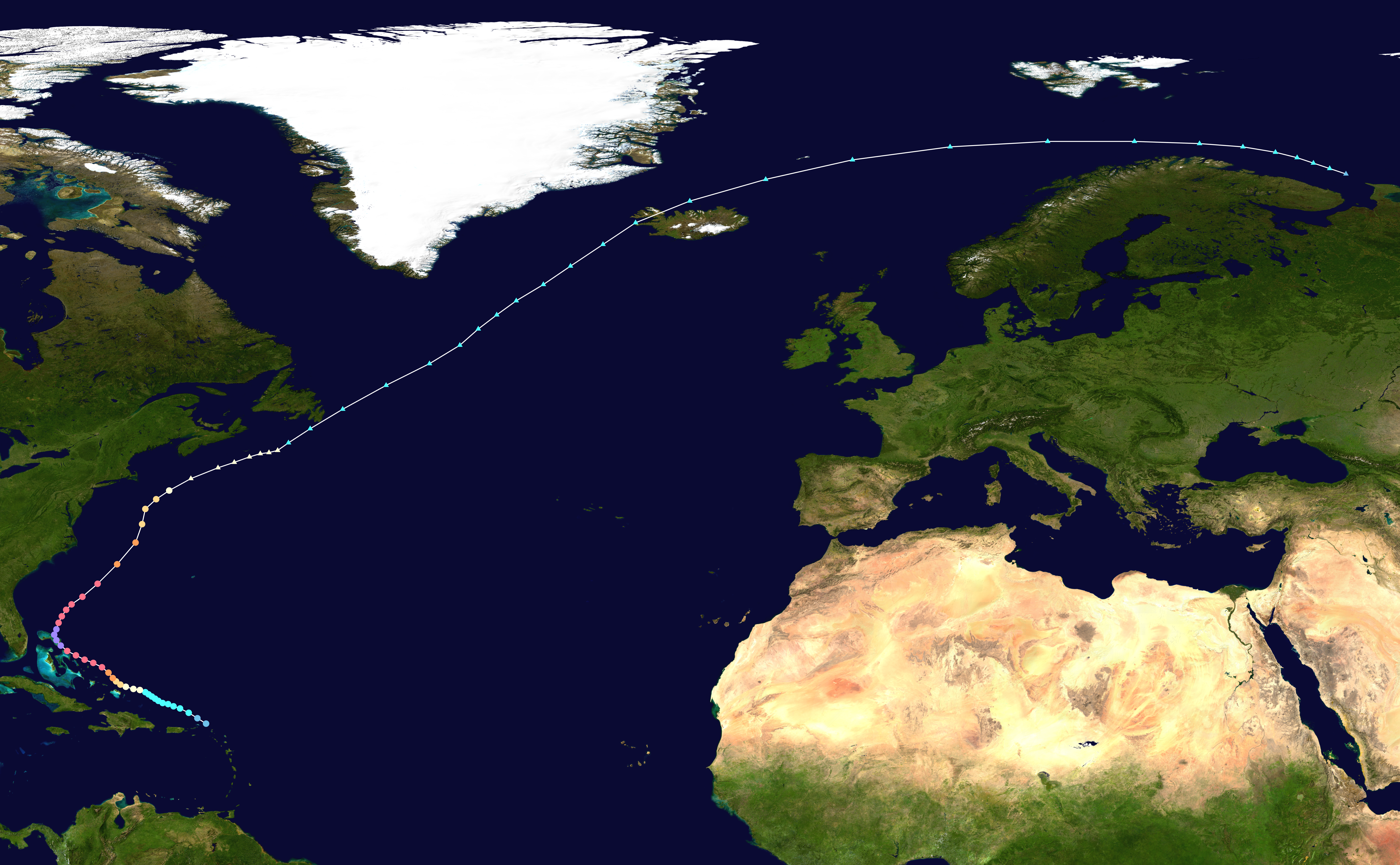
Map plotting the storm's track and intensity, according to the Saffir–Simpson scale Map key Saffir–Simpson scale Tropical depression (≤38 mph, ≤62 km/h) Tropical storm (39–73 mph, 63–118 km/h) Category 1 (74–95 mph, 119–153 km/h) Category 2 (96–110 mph, 154–177 km/h) Category 3 (111–129 mph, 178–208 km/h) Category 4 (130–156 mph, 209–251 km/h) Category 5 (≥157 mph, ≥252 km/h) Unknown Storm type Tropical cyclone Subtropical cyclone Extratropical cyclone, remnant low, tropical disturbance, or monsoon depression

At 18:00 UTC on August 30, (Note: All dates are based on UTC unless specified.) a low-pressure area—first noted then by the Weather Bureau as a weak "disturbance"—developed into a tropical depression 50 miles (80 kilometres) east of Anegada in the British Virgin Islands, as per the hurricane database (HURDAT). (Note: An official record of tropical-cyclone data) Over the next six days, it headed generally west-northwest, with a ship report of 52 mph (84 km/h) indicating a tropical storm on August 31. (Note: The fourth of the season) On September 2, while treated as a "moderate" storm by the Weather Bureau, it passed 100 mi (160 km) east-northeast of Grand Turk Island, at which time it became a minimal hurricane. (Note: The third storm of the year to do so) Tracking overnight north of the Greater Antilles, the storm's winds rapidly rose from 75–110 mph (120–175 km/h)—a rate of 35 mph (55 km/h)—over the next 24 hours. Late on September 3, a ship first logged hurricane-force winds. On September 4, the storm became a Category 3 and then a Category 4 hurricane. (Note: With winds of at least 111 mph (179 km/h) and 130 mph (209 km/h), respectively) On that day ships reported top winds at 60 mph (97 km/h). On September 5, the storm peaked at 160 mph (260 km/h) and hit the Abaco Islands, part of the Bahamian chain, with the same winds. A reanalysis in 2012 assigned the winds using a pressure reading of at most 27.50 inches of mercury (931 millibars) by a barometer on Green Turtle Cay, from which a value based on pressure–wind relations was derived. This suggested winds of 141 to 147 mph (227 to 237 km/h), but the pressure was the lowest readable value on its scale and may have been taken outside the eye, so a higher speed was assumed. (Note: A 2014 paper based on the reanalysis estimated the lowest value at 918 mb (27.1 inHg), and an even lower measurement of 27.20 inHg (921 mb) was taken in Hope Town on the edge of the eye, but neither was used in the reanalysis.) This made the storm one of four Category 5 cyclones to strike the Bahamas at that intensity, the others being the 1933 Cuba–Brownsville hurricane, 1992's Hurricane Andrew, and 2019's Hurricane Dorian. (Note: The last of these also traversed the Abaco Islands as a Category 5.)

The storm turned north during landfall, missing the most populous Bahamian islands—and the capital Nassau—well to the east. Over the next few days it gradually curved northeast, roughly paralleling the mainland United States, and weakened, but retained winds of at least 145 mph (230 km/h). Two ships near the center, the Deer Lodge and Yankee Arrow, clocked winds of Beaufort Force 12, with the lowest barometer measuring 27.58 inHg (934 mb). On this basis, as well as data from other ships and coastal weather stations, reanalysis deduced a large wind field with peak velocities of 138 mph (222 km/h) or greater. On September 8, the storm began to weaken more quickly and lost major hurricane status. During the evening it angled north toward New England, passing about 200 mi (320 km) offshore with winds of 100 mph (155 km/h). On the following day, it became extratropical and turned east-northeast. On September 11, it shed hurricane intensity and resumed a northeast course, passing just south of the Avalon Peninsula, Newfoundland, with winds of 70 mph (110 km/h). On September 14–15, the storm traveled near the Snæfellsnes, Iceland, and Jan Mayen, an island 370 mi (595 km) northeast of Iceland. It then veered eastward, passing north of the Scandinavian Peninsula on September 16. On the following day, the system curled to the east-southeast, passing over the southern Barents Sea, and then dissipated northeast of the Kola Peninsula. (Note: Then part of the Russian SFSR in the Soviet Union)

== Preparations ==
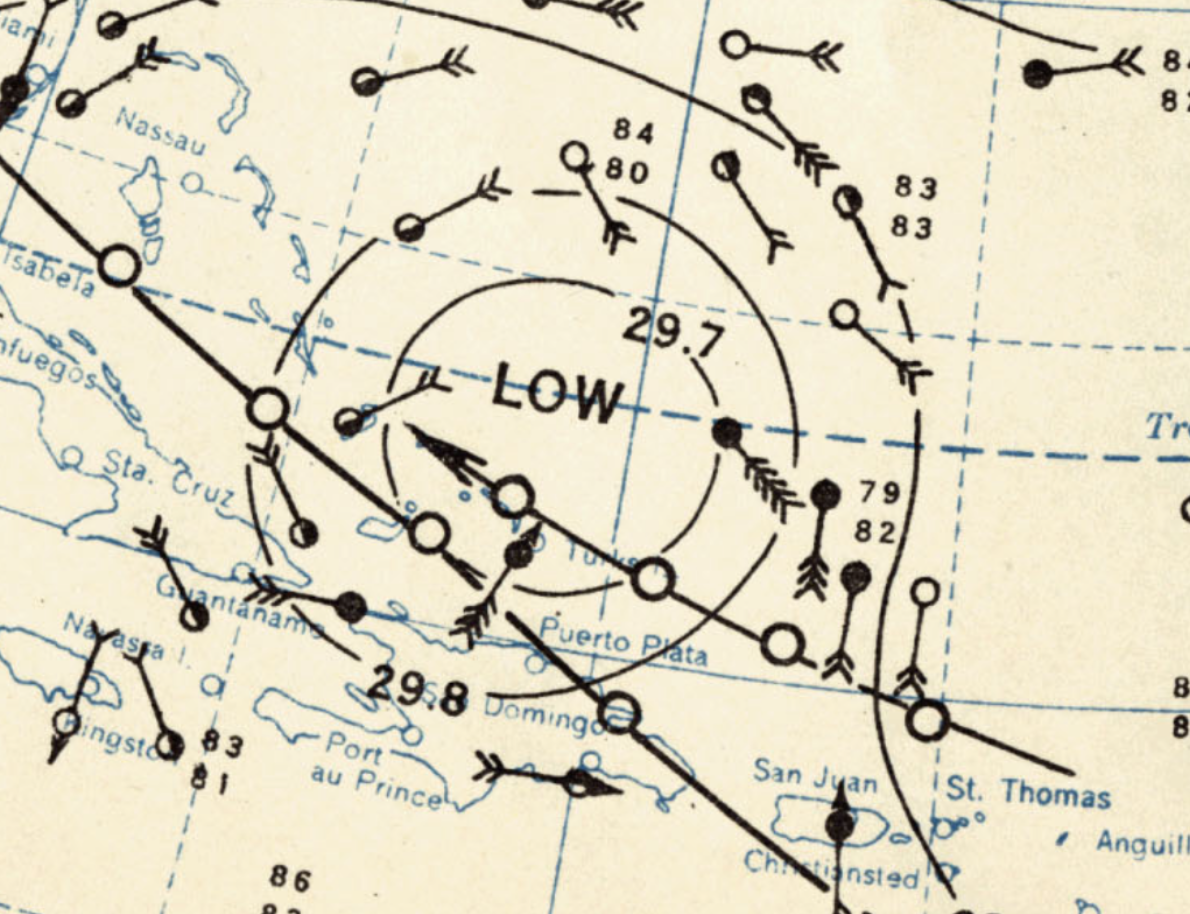
Map of the storm nearing the Bahamas on September 3

On September 5, the Weather Bureau first posted storm warnings in the United States from Daytona Beach to Punta Gorda, Florida. Partly due to the warnings, people in the affected areas began shuttering windows and finishing other preparations as early as September 3. To house evacuees, Melbourne converted a local high school into a storm shelter. Owing to demand, gasoline ran out at many filling stations between West Palm Beach and Jacksonville. A pair of trains evacuated the Lake Okeechobee area, due to fears of deadly flooding similar to a 1928 storm. Shrimp boats sheltered in the Amelia and St. Marys rivers. As the storm veered away from Florida, the Weather Bureau canceled and reissued warnings from Daytona Beach to Wilmington, North Carolina. The agency later extended these up the East Coast to Eastport, Maine. Boats were secured in the Carolinas. Vessels also sought safety farther north, such as in New England.

== Impact ==
The storm dispersed impacts from the Bahamas to Iceland, though it directly struck few areas other than islands. It killed 37–38 people, about half of them in the Bahamas, and injured hundreds. It generated extreme winds and tides in the Bahamas, though its worst impacts were limited to the Abaco Islands. In Canada the storm caused 14–15 fatalities. Ample radio warnings limited the death toll to five in the United States: two each in New Jersey and Massachusetts, and one in New York. Monetary losses in the Bahamas were unknown, but totaled several thousand dollars in the United States and over $33,800 in Canada. (Note: All losses are in 1932 USD unless otherwise noted.)

=== The Bahamas ===
Collage showing aftermath of the storm in the Bahamas

The cyclone's core lashed the Abaco Islands with Category 5 winds and catastrophic storm surge. An anemometer at Hope Town was disabled after recording a gust to 160 mph (260 km/h). Eyewitnesses estimated gusts on the Abaco Islands at over 200 mph (320 km/h). The strongest winds—forensically estimated from photographs to be at least 150 mph (240 km/h)—hit Green Turtle Cay. A large storm surge, dubbed a "tidal wave" by press reports, also struck the area. Storm surge levels on the worst-hit islands exceeded 20 ft (6.1 m). Intense thunder and lightning attended the storm. Storm victims also alleged earthquakes that worsened other aspects of the storm. The eye of the storm passed near or over Hope Town, Marsh Harbour, and Green Turtle Cay, yielding calm conditions at the latter two sites. In some areas the storm lasted one and a half days.

The storm caused 18 fatalities in the Bahamas: (Note: A 1932 report in the Monthly Weather Review put the death toll at 16.) 10 on Great Abaco Island, including six at Cedar Harbour and four at Coopers Town; six on Green Turtle Cay; and two on Great Guana Cay. The storm hit during daytime, minimizing the death toll. Few ships were lost at sea, though the dead were all sailors. In addition, the storm injured 300 people, 26 of whom suffered acute injuries on Green Turtle Cay. The storm displaced most of the islanders on the cay. Winds flattened a pair of stone churches, blocks of which were thrown up to 0.5 mi (0.80 km). The storm tore apart 68 out of 80 homes, along with four churches, a hotel, and a school. All fruit trees and coconut palms were toppled. Storm surge overflowed Green Turtle Cay, removing buildings and vegetation. A creek spilled over its banks, eroding a cemetery and exposing corpses. Wind and surge wrecked most of the homes in the New Plymouth settlement. Surging seas forced most of the people to flee. After the storm, debris cluttered the area, so that residents "were literally walking on house roofs." The debris littered the island, fatally crushing livestock. All boats on Green Turtle Cay were destroyed, where high tides carried a mail boat 7 mi (11 km). At Hope Town the cyclone destroyed 83 homes, a wireless radio station, a few churches, the post office, and a jail. Additionally, 103 homes were damaged, 63 severely, along with a commissioner's office and home. One home was blown up to 0.25 mi (0.40 km) away. A few boats were wrecked as well, while a tin washtub floated 7.5 mi (12.1 km).

Aerial view of the damage on Green Turtle Cay

The storm smashed 200 homes—90% of the total there—on Great Abaco, virtually leveling six settlements. The storm razed 171 homes in the villages of Cornish Town, Cherokee Sound, Cedar Harbour, Riding Rock, Blackwood, and Coopers Town. Only six out of 46 homes in Coopers Town survived the storm. At Marsh Harbour the storm wrecked 13 homes, schools, a pair of wharves, and the post office. An additional 3,012 homes were badly damaged, along with a number of boats. The storm felled thousands of fruit trees, including 3,000 banana plants. All local crops were ruined. Water levels rose to over 8 ft (2.4 m)—higher than in three 1926 hurricanes. A cemetery was destroyed at Bluff Point, along with boats, a school, and churches. Most of the damage was surge-related. An aerial survey found that "[t]here was nothing left" of the village, and the entire population was homeless. Only four out of 35 homes remained intact on Great Guana Cay. A visitor described the cay as "swept off the face of the earth." Storm surge inundated the cay, and all livestock was killed. Numerous boats were shattered. A further 24 homes were severely damaged or destroyed on Man-O-War Cay. Portions of Moore's Island flooded to a depth of 5 ft (1.5 m), lifting homes off their foundations. Several minor injuries occurred. The storm extensively damaged or destroyed many homes on Grand Bahama, several of which lost their roofs. Hawksbill Creek rose 9 ft (2.7 m). Vessels were damaged as well. Citrus trees were heavily damaged at West End. At Spanish Cay the storm destroyed a home, and flattened six more at Sales Cay. Small watercraft, a schooner, and a sloop were swept out at Water Cay.

Elsewhere in the Bahamas the storm caused lesser damage. Winds on Eleuthera considerably damaged crops, roads, and part of a wharf. On Watling Island (now San Salvador), the storm only destroyed a radio station. On New Providence, damage was confined to tomato crops. Although the cyclone passed within 65 mi (105 km) of the capital, it barely affected Nassau. On Cat Island the storm downed power lines.

=== Florida to the Carolinas and Bermuda ===
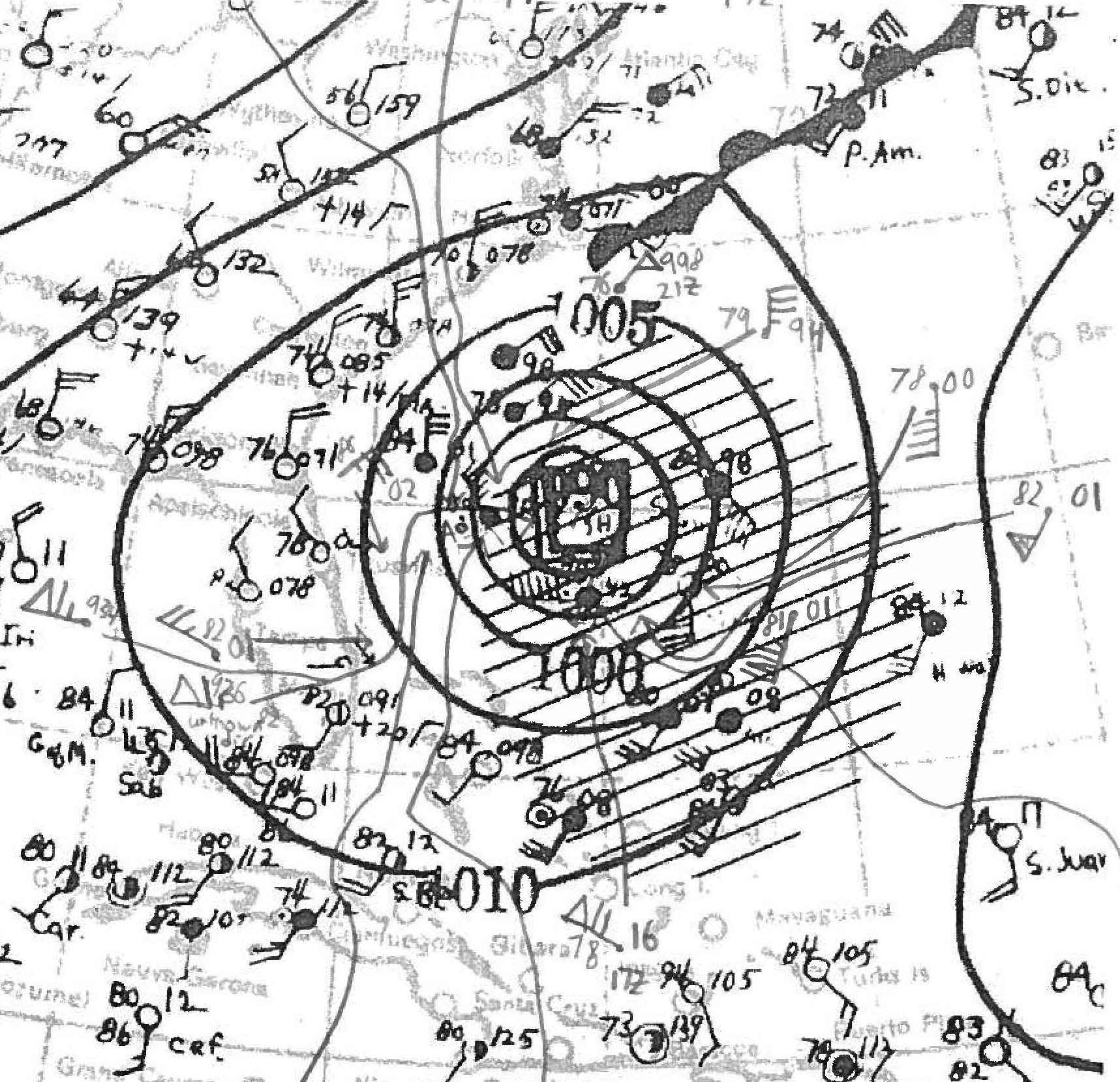
Map of the storm off the East Coast on September 7

While staying offshore, the storm generated gales and heavy swells along the coastal Southeastern United States. The highest wind speeds affected Cape Hatteras on the Outer Banks, reaching 44 to 52 mph (71 to 84 km/h). Spectacular wave action pummeled the Florida shore, with large breakers astounding onlookers from Cape Canaveral to Miami. Above-normal tides in North Carolina undermined an unfinished road between New and Oregon inlets. A ferry en route from Manns Harbor to Roanoke Island made a forced detour to Wanchese, 10 mi (16 km) south of its normal port. The storm unmoored a lightship off Cape Lookout. The Munson Line steamer Munloyal lost its rudder while drifting 350 mi (565 km) southeast of Frying Pan Shoals. The storm snapped a radio antenna and a propeller on the ship, causing it to deviate 72 mi (116 km) off course. The United States Coast Guard sent cutters from Fort Lauderdale, Florida, to its aid. The edge of the storm brought rough seas and blustery winds to Bermuda, suspending a test of the Bathysphere.

=== Mid-Atlantic states ===
While it initially menaced the Mid-Atlantic, the storm turned seaward off the eastern United States. However, damage from the storm affected the entire region, notably in New Jersey and New York. Surf and wind impacts were locally extensive. In New York, squalls capsized a skiff on Pelham Bay, drowning one of its two occupants. The storm also abraded 8 ft (2.4 m) of shoreline at Oak Beach. The storm gouged beachfront near Montauk and at Westhampton Beach, carving a 10-foot-wide (3.0 m) inlet at the latter site. On a nearby road, water depths reached 1 ft (0.30 m) for 0.25 mi (0.40 km). Stormy weather caused a motorboat to drift onto a sandbar near Dead Horse Bay, stranding its two occupants for a few hours. Due to surf, a tour boat diverted to Camden, New Jersey, with 225 passengers aboard, of whom many became seasick. Wind gusts toppled large trees and signs in Brooklyn. As weather improved, cold temperatures succeeded the hurricane, with a high of 54 degrees Fahrenheit (12 degrees Celsius) in New York City nearing a then-daily record low. On the high seas, the storm rocked the steamship Manhattan, injuring several passengers.

In New Jersey, two people drowned. Waves swept away parts of the Atlantic City Boardwalk, along with a fishing pier at Stone Harbor and the remains of another in Ocean City. At the latter, the ocean also wrecked a clubhouse. At Cape May, a water main, a section of a boardwalk, and railing were destroyed. In Atlantic City, waves isolated motorists and snapped folding doors at a Skee-Ball arcade. Sea spray heights reached 30 ft (9.1 m), drenching streets and sightseers. Streets were submerged in several towns near the Absecon Inlet. In the Matawan area, the storm tore apart bungalows, moorings, and bulkheads. Tides on Matawan Creek and at Keyport rose to within a foot of the record, slightly damaging boats at the latter place. Strong winds downed tree limbs, blocking traffic. At Point Pleasant Beach, bystanders rescued three people from dangerous undertow, averting drownings. Seawater overtopped a seawall at Monmouth Beach and submersed parts of Highlands. Major beach erosion occurred in North Jersey. The Shrewsbury River backed up, clogging sewers in Sea Bright. Four missing anglers were found off Cape May. Farther south, low-lying parts of Norfolk, Virginia, flooded.

=== New England ===
The storm passed closest to the United States off New England, causing heavy shipping losses due to high seas and fierce winds. In Massachusetts, the schooner Getrude L. Thebaud sank off Highland Light with a loss of two crew members. Coast Guardsmen fetched a crew of two from an upended sloop at Scituate. As many as 30 boats grounded on or around Nantucket. At Manomet, the storm sank or unmoored 16 out of 20 boats. Losses to lobster traps, fishing boats, and other vessels totaled several thousand dollars in the Plymouth area, where many dories washed ashore near Plymouth Rock. The surf drew several hundred viewers. Unparalleled tides cast dozens of boats ashore on Cape Cod. Up to 25 vessels went aground, sank, or disintegrated off Vineyard Haven on Martha's Vineyard. Debris from boats and docks filled the seas off the island. Tides were among the highest known to the oldest residents. In Rhode Island, small boats wrecked at Newport.

The storm produced winds of 60 to 65 mph (97 to 105 km/h) in coastal Massachusetts, with gales buffeting the coast up to northern New England. The winds loosened signs, shattered windows, damaged cropland, sheared tree limbs, and shredded gardens. The winds propelled salt spray inland, flooding brackish ponds. Winds off the Massachusetts coast neared 90 mph (140 km/h), delaying the departure of ships from Boston Harbor. The storm crippled the auxiliary training ship Nantucket offshore of New England, causing it to drift 50 mi (80 km) after high seas caused flooding, disabled the radio, and wrenched loose an anchor weighing 1.5 tonnes (1,500 kilograms). The Nantucket also lost three lifeboats and a 3-foot (0.91 m) section of the spar deck, and tossed a motorboat off a davit into the chart house.

=== Atlantic Canada and beyond ===
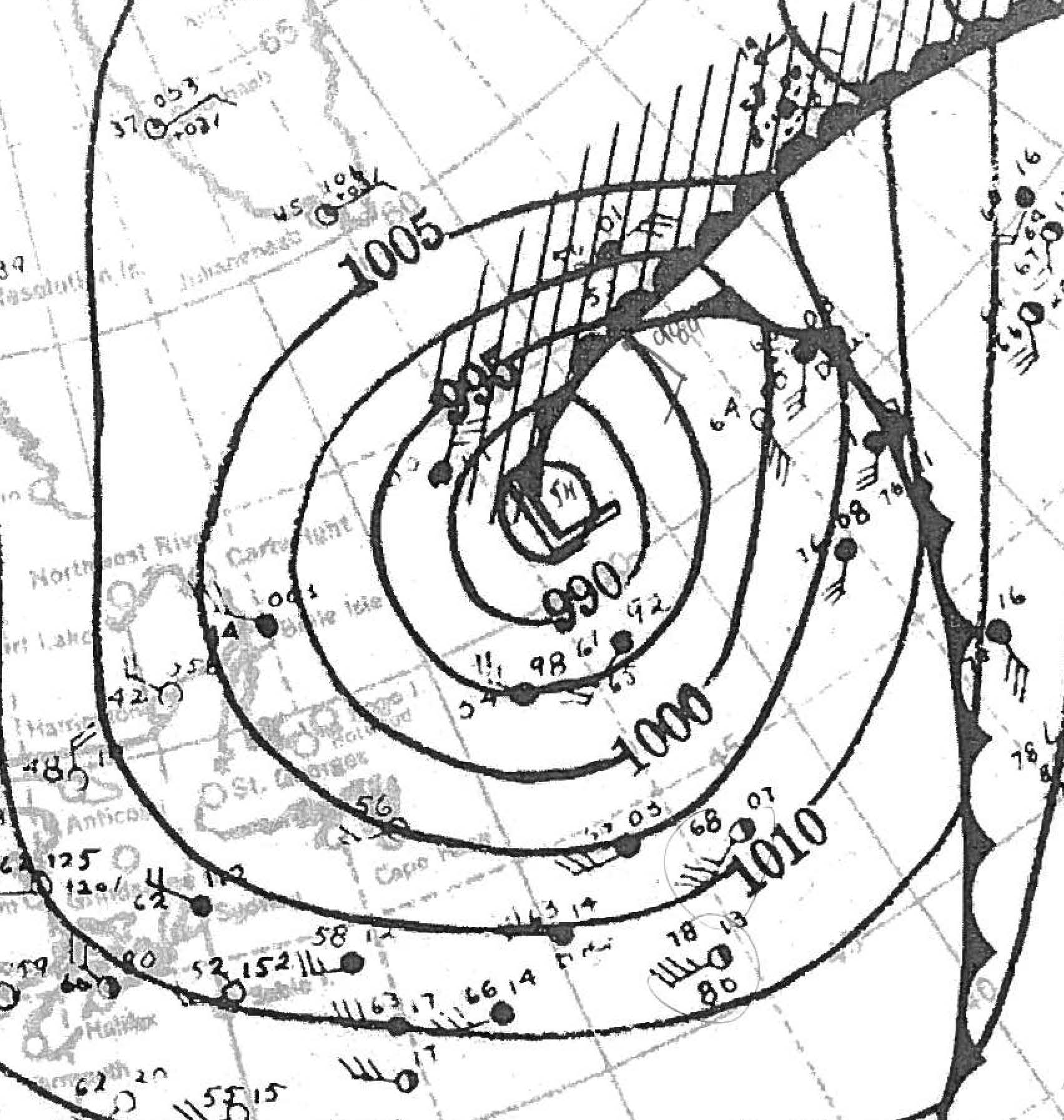
Map of the storm south of Greenland on September 12

As it tracked just offshore of the Maritimes, the post-tropical remnants of the storm produced gusts to 100 mph (160 km/h). These winds mostly occurred over water, but within the contemporary Canadian Hurricane Centre forecast zone. Flooding, wave action, and winds caused widespread damage to shipping, crops, and buildings in Atlantic Canada. There, 14–15 fatalities occurred, all offshore or due to shipwrecks. The schooner Patara broke up off Labrador, with the loss of seven or eight people aboard. Another schooner, the Beebe, succumbed as well, along with its crew of four, near Cape Breton Island. The steamship Watford began sinking off Glace Bay and struck Cape Percy, with two dead. A man aboard the Mary H. Hirtle drowned off Sable Island. The schooner Maude Thornhill vanished and was feared lost.

At Canso, Nova Scotia, the storm sank two pleasure craft and 18 fishing boats. Three boats beached at Scatarie Island, as did a liquor carrier at Lingan. A barge loaded with cordwood sank at Noel, in Hants County. Losses to lobster fishing equipment at Amherst totaled "several thousand dollars". On Prince Edward Island, 25 fishing boats were a total loss at Little Cape, along with half a dozen more at Pouch Cove, Newfoundland. The schooner Johanna went ashore at St. Brendan's and broke up. Another schooner, the Cornet, beached at Leading Teakles. In Hermitage, 16 smacks and all the fishing stages were torn apart. At Cappa Hayden, the steamer Odensholm grounded. The storm ripped apart an abandoned steamer at Burnt Point. In addition, the storm drove four schooners onto Saint Pierre and Miquelon.

Hurricane-force winds swept the coast, damaging buildings and utilities. Winds on Cape Breton Island reached 81 mph (130 km/h), knocking down phone and power lines. Winds leveled small buildings at Pugwash. At Canso, winds toppled a chimney, crumpling the roof of a church. A fire during the storm engulfed a few garages, a hotel, and homes at Beaconsfield, causing losses of $33,800. At Culdesac, Newfoundland, winds buckled a few homes and a church. A few homes at Recontre lost their roofs. The storm also flooded parts of Cape Breton Island, obliterating roads and railways. The storm laid waste to 10% of the apple crop in the Annapolis Valley. At Chéticamp, it damaged grain and wheat crops. In coastal Newfoundland, the storm destroyed vegetable gardens. As it passed near Iceland and Jan Mayen, the latter observed pressures at or below 29 inHg (980 mb). Rough weather incapacitated a fishing vessel off Patreksfjörður, Iceland, necessitating the rescue of its crew.

== Aftermath ==
During the week of the storm, communication with Great Abaco was nonexistent. Saltwater intrusion and animal carcasses contaminated well water on the island, on Elbow Cay, and in nearby areas. Food supplies ran low on the Abaco Islands, as well as on Grand Bahama between Eight Mile Rock and Sweeting Cay. On Green Turtle Cay, residents endured food shortages by subsisting on coconuts and sugarcane. Islanders also rationed fresh water until the relief ship Lady Cordeaux replenished the supply on September 10. The vessel also brought blankets, food, and construction materials. Three Abaco parliamentarians partook in relief as well. The few intact homes were used as makeshift hospitals. Due to a lack of bandages, burnt sponges were used instead to treat wounds, many of which required amputation. Buildings weakened by the storm collapsed hours after it ended, causing some deaths. Charles Dundas, then Colonial Secretary of the Bahamas, and the wife of Bede Clifford, the Bahamian governor, surveyed the aftermath on Great Abaco; the latter collected rags, dressed a wound, and provided anesthetic there.

Donors privately contributed as well, including the victims' relatives. Many groups set up relief funds, among them churches and the Royal Bank of Canada. The Nassau Theatre Club held a benefit showing of Edward G. Robinson's Two Seconds. Senior government officials attended a relief show at Victoria Hall. The Daughters of the Empire and other organizations hosted special events such as relief luncheons. The ship Ena K. sailed from Miami to deliver 21 packages of clothing. The Government House was converted into a distribution center, pooling private contributions. Public relief was scarce, but locals quickly rebuilt. Across Elbow Cay, the destruction of three settlements engendered the creation of Dundas Town. Due to the loss of timber mills and sponge fisheries, many locals permanently fled the Abaco Islands, seeking jobs in Nassau or the United States. The storm contributed to a seven-year span of severe hurricanes in the Bahamas, notably in 1926, 1928, 1929, and 1933. The cumulative effects of these storms made Bahamian sponge diving unviable, effectively ending a pillar to the local economy.

== See also ==
- Hurricanes in the Bahama Archipelago

- 1899 San Ciriaco hurricane – A destructive, long-lived Category 4 hurricane that took a similar path, devastating the Bahamas
- Hurricane Joaquin (2015) – A Category 4 hurricane that struck similar areas of the Bahamas, causing widespread damage

- Tropical cyclone effects in Europe
