= Hurricane Dorian =

Category 5 Atlantic hurricane in 2019

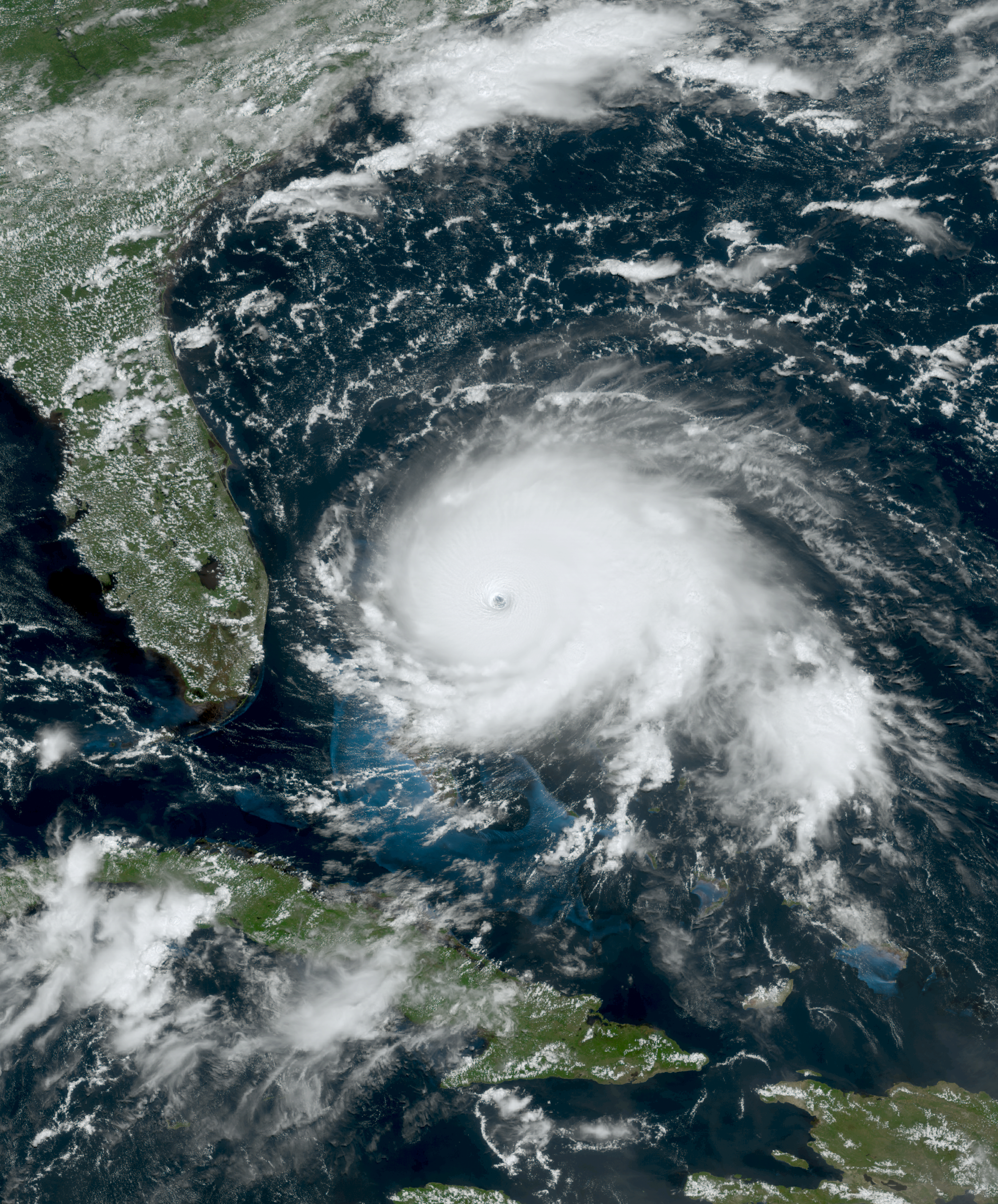
- Hurricane Dorian making landfall on the Abaco Islands at peak intensity on September 1

Meteorological history
- Formed: August 24, 2019
- Extratropical: September 7, 2019
- Dissipated: September 10, 2019

Category 5 major hurricane
- 1-minute sustained (SSHWS/NWS)
- Highest winds: 185 mph (295 km/h)
- Lowest pressure: 910 mbar (hPa); 26.87 inHg

Overall effects
- Fatalities: 84 (77 direct, 7 indirect)
- Missing: 245
- Damage: ≥$5.08 billion (2019 USD) (Costliest in Bahamian history)
- Areas affected: Lesser Antilles; Puerto Rico; The Bahamas; Eastern United States; Eastern Canada
- IBTrACS
- Part of the 2019 Atlantic hurricane season
- History: Meteorological history; Effects: The Caribbean; The Bahamas; The Carolinas; Atlantic Canada; Alabama controversy; Other wikis: Commons: Dorian images

Hurricane Dorian was an extremely powerful and catastrophic tropical cyclone, which became the most intense on record to strike the Bahamas. It is tied with the 1935 Labor Day hurricane and Hurricane Melissa in 2025 for the strongest landfall in the Atlantic basin in terms of maximum sustained winds. It is regarded as the worst natural disaster in the Bahamas' recorded history. With winds peaking at 185 mph (295 km/h), it was also one of the most powerful hurricanes recorded in the Atlantic Ocean in terms of 1-minute sustained winds, and the strongest since Wilma in 2005. Dorian was the fourth named storm, second hurricane, the first major hurricane, and the first Category 5 hurricane of the 2019 Atlantic hurricane season. Dorian struck the Abaco Islands on September 1 with maximum sustained winds of 185 mph (295 km/h), tying with the 1935 Labor Day hurricane and Melissa for the highest wind speeds of an Atlantic hurricane ever recorded at landfall. Dorian went on to strike Grand Bahama at similar intensity, stalling just north of the territory with unrelenting winds for at least 24 hours. The resultant damage to these islands was catastrophic; most structures were flattened or swept to sea, and at least 70,000 people were left homeless. After it ravaged through The Bahamas, Dorian proceeded along the coasts of the Southeastern United States and Atlantic Canada, leaving behind considerable damage and economic losses in those regions.

Dorian developed from a tropical wave on August 24 over the Central Atlantic. The storm moved through the Lesser Antilles and became a hurricane north of the Greater Antilles on August 28. Dorian proceeded to undergo rapid intensification over the following days, before reaching its peak as a Category 5 hurricane with one-minute sustained winds of 185 mph (295 km/h) and a minimum central pressure of 910 millibars (26.87 inHg) by September 1. It made landfall in The Bahamas in Elbow Cay, just east of Abaco Island, and again on Grand Bahama several hours later, where it remained nearly stationary for the next day or so. After weakening considerably, Dorian began moving northwestward on September 3, parallel to the east coast of Florida. Dwindling in strength, the hurricane turned to the northeast the next day and made landfall on Cape Hatteras (North Carolina) at Category 2 intensity on September 6. Dorian transitioned into an extratropical cyclone on September 7, before striking first Nova Scotia and then Newfoundland with hurricane-force winds on the next day. The storm finally dissipated near Greenland on September 10.

From August 26 to August 28, the storm affected several parts of the northernmost Lesser Antilles. Damaging winds primarily affected the Virgin Islands where gusts reached 111 mph (179 km/h). Extensive precautionary measures were taken to mitigate damage, especially in Puerto Rico, where one person died. Elsewhere in the Lesser Antilles, impacts from the storm were relatively minor. In preparation for the storm, the states of Florida, Georgia, South Carolina, North Carolina and Virginia all declared a state of emergency and many coastal counties from Florida to North Carolina issued mandatory evacuation orders. Damage in The Bahamas was catastrophic due to the prolonged and intense storm conditions, including heavy rainfall, high winds and storm surge, with thousands of homes destroyed and at least 77 direct deaths recorded, 74 of which occurred in The Bahamas. The true death toll is unknown, with 245 people still missing as of August 2020. Dorian is the costliest disaster in Bahamian history, estimated to have left behind $3.4 billion (2020 USD) in damage in that country, while causing a total of $5.08 billion in damage overall. Due to the damage and loss of life, the name Dorian was later retired from the Atlantic rotating naming lists by the World Meteorological Organization.

== Meteorological history ==
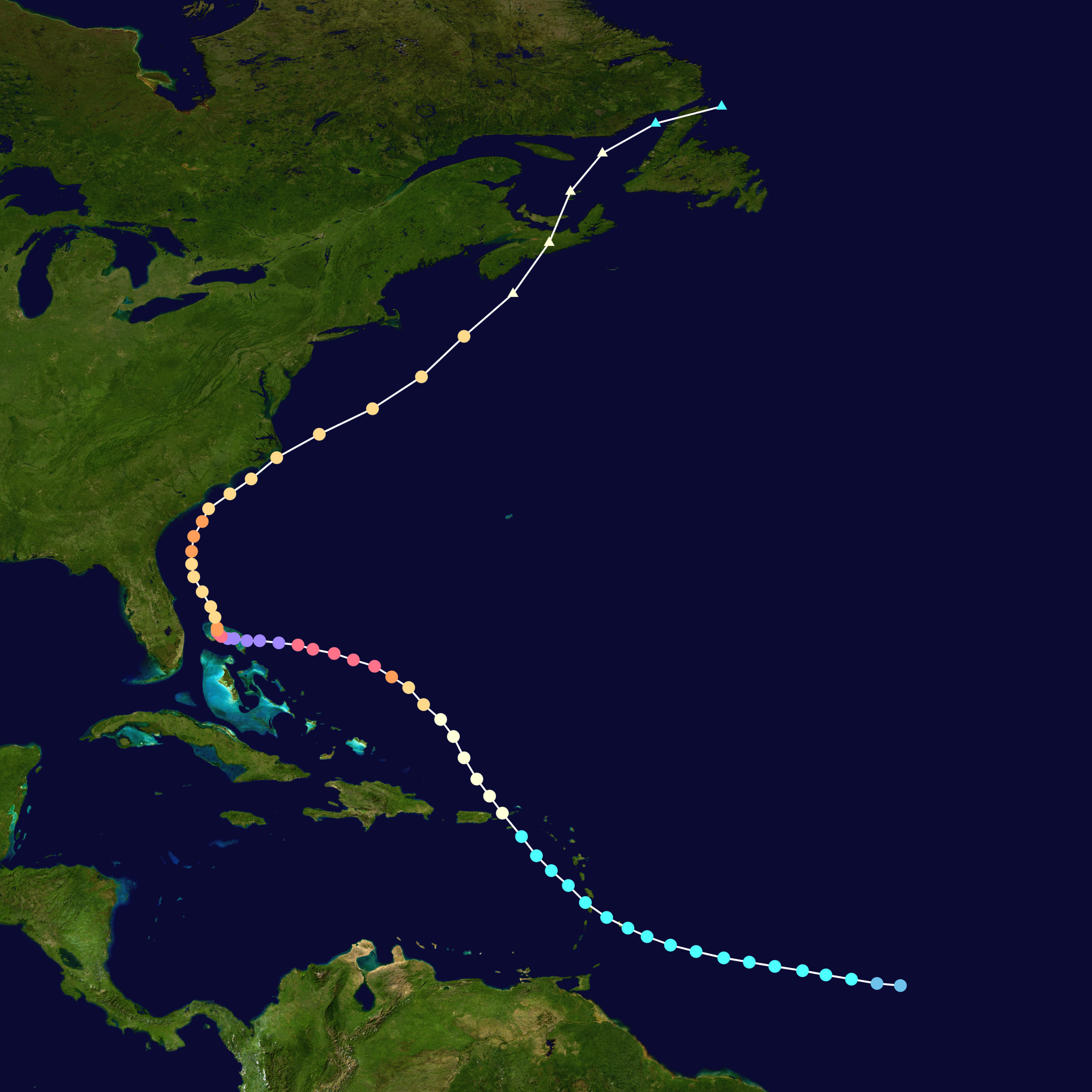
Map plotting the storm's track and intensity, according to the Saffir–Simpson scale Map key Saffir–Simpson scale Tropical depression (≤38 mph, ≤62 km/h) Tropical storm (39–73 mph, 63–118 km/h) Category 1 (74–95 mph, 119–153 km/h) Category 2 (96–110 mph, 154–177 km/h) Category 3 (111–129 mph, 178–208 km/h) Category 4 (130–156 mph, 209–251 km/h) Category 5 (≥157 mph, ≥252 km/h) Unknown Storm type Tropical cyclone Subtropical cyclone Extratropical cyclone, remnant low, tropical disturbance, or monsoon depression

On August 19, 2019, the National Hurricane Center (NHC) identified a tropical wave—an elongated trough of low air pressure—within a monsoon trough over Guinea and Senegal in western Africa. Convective activity associated with the wave was limited by an abundance of Saharan dust in the region. Propagating west over the tropical Atlantic Ocean, the system remained disorganized for several days. On August 23, a defined area of low pressure consolidated at the surface and thunderstorm activity increased. The system acquired sufficient organized convection to be classified as Tropical Depression Five at 15:00 UTC on August 24. At this time the system was situated 805 mi (1,300 km) east-southeast of Barbados. A deep ridge imparted continued westward movement of the depression, steering it toward the Lesser Antilles. A small cyclone, it soon developed a defined inner core with a 12 mi (18 km) wide eye-like feature. This marked the system's intensification into a tropical storm, at which time it was assigned the name Dorian by the NHC. Thereafter, moderate wind shear and surrounding dry air limited further organization. Rainbands gradually wrapped more around Dorian on August 25–26, though convection remained inconsistent.

Strongest landfalling Atlantic hurricanes^{†}
Rank	Hurricane	Season	Wind speed	
Rank	Hurricane	Season	mph	km/h
1	"Labor Day"	1935	185	295
1	Dorian	2019	185	295
1	Melissa	2025	185	295
4	Irma	2017	180	285
5	Janet	1955	175	280
5	Camille	1969	175	280
5	Anita	1977	175	280
5	David	1979	175	280
5	Dean	2007	175	280
10	"Cuba"	1924	165	270
10	Andrew	1992	165	270
10	Maria	2017	165	270
Source: HURDAT, AOML/HRD
†Strength refers to maximum sustained wind speed upon striking land.

Dorian continued moving west and made landfall at 01:00 UTC on August 27 in Barbados, bringing tropical storm-force winds and heavy rain. It then started moving northwestward toward Saint Lucia. At 11:00 UTC of the same day, Dorian made landfall on the island of Saint Lucia as a tropical storm, briefly disrupting the core of the storm, before entering the Caribbean Sea. The storm underwent a center relocation further north, to the west of Martinique, causing the island to experience tropical storm-force winds as well. Dorian had been predicted to travel northwest and pass over or near the Dominican Republic or Puerto Rico, possibly allowing their mountainous terrain to weaken the tropical storm. At that time, dry air and wind shear were expected to prevent Dorian from attaining hurricane status—although just barely. However, Dorian took a more northerly track than expected, causing it to pass to the east of Puerto Rico and hit the US Virgin Islands. On August 28, Dorian intensified into a Category 1 hurricane as it approached the US Virgin Islands, where hurricane-force winds were recorded; at 15:30 UTC that day, Dorian became a hurricane and made landfall in Saint Croix and a few hours later, at 18:00 UTC, Dorian made landfall on Saint Thomas at a slightly higher intensity. However, the hurricane's small size prevented mainland Puerto Rico from experiencing hurricane- or tropical storm-force winds, although this was not the case for the Spanish Virgin Islands.

Once the system moved north past the Virgin Islands, the storm entered a more favorable environment. On the next day, the system started to rapidly intensify, reaching Category 2 status early on August 30. Rapid intensification continued, and the storm eventually reached major hurricane status several hours later, on the same day. This strengthening trend came to a halt for the remainder of the day, but soon resumed. The system continued strengthening, and on August 31, Dorian attained Category 4 major hurricane status. Dorian reached Category 5 intensity on the following day. On the morning of September 1, a dropsonde deployed by a NOAA aircraft measured a wind gust of 176 knots (326 km/h; 203 mph) at the surface. With one-minute sustained winds of 180 mph (285 km/h) and a minimum pressure of 913 mbar (27.0 inHg), the NHC noted that Dorian was the strongest hurricane in modern records to affect the northwestern Bahamas.

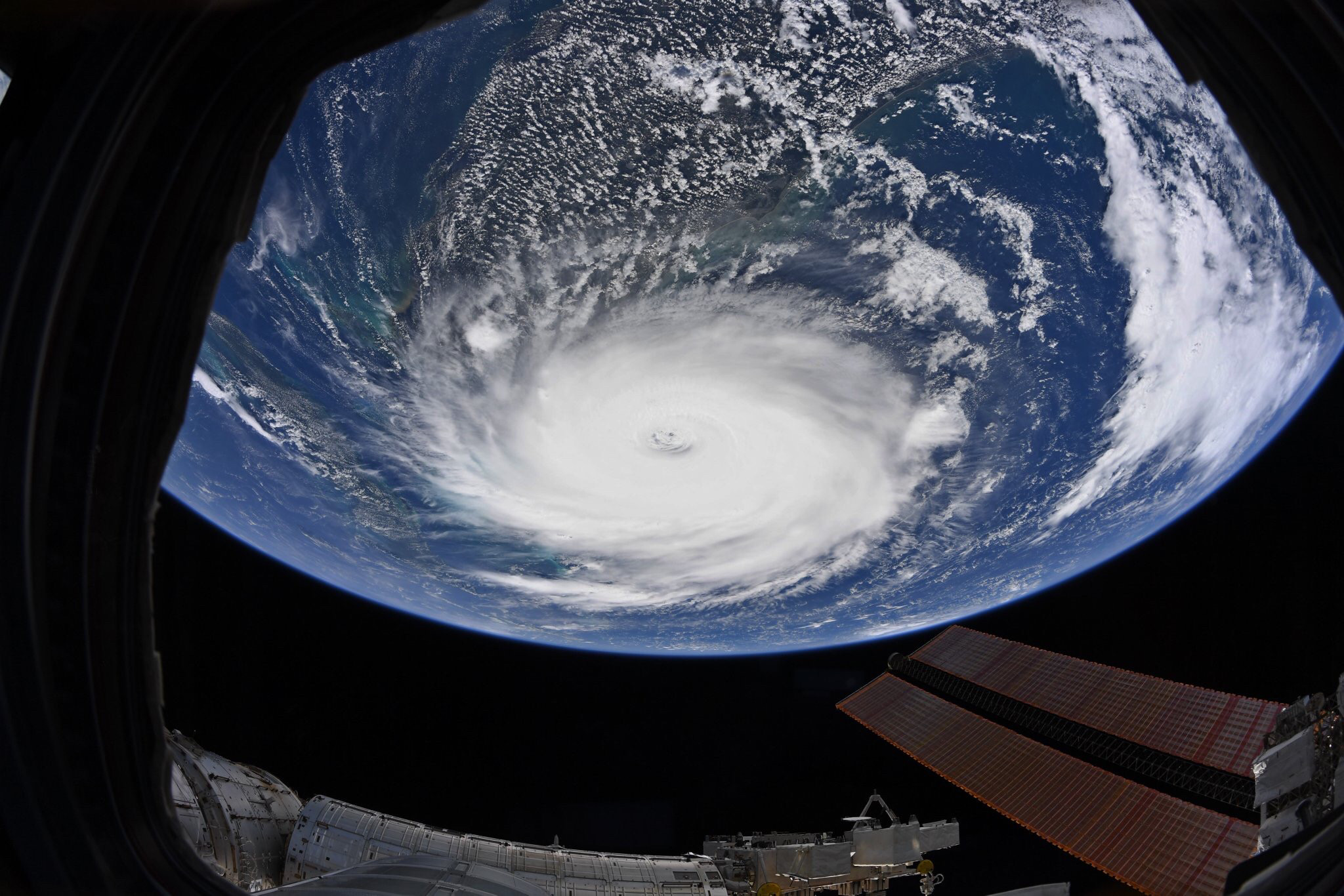
Hurricane Dorian as seen from the International Space Station on September 2, 2019

At 16:40 UTC on September 1, Dorian made landfall on Great Abaco Island in The Bahamas, with one-minute sustained winds of 185 mph (298 km/h), wind gusts over 220 mph (355 km/h), and a central barometric pressure of 910 millibars (27 inHg), as Dorian reached its peak intensity during landfall. Storm chaser Josh Morgerman observed a pressure of 913.4 mbar (26.97 inHg) in Marsh Harbour. Dorian's forward speed decreased around this time, slowing to a westward crawl of 5 mph (8.0 km/h). At 02:00 UTC on September 2, Dorian made landfall on Grand Bahama near the same intensity, with the same sustained wind speed. Afterward, Dorian's forward speed slowed to just 1 knot (1.2 mph; 1.9 km/h), as the Bermuda High that was steering the storm westward weakened. Later that day, the storm began to undergo an eyewall replacement cycle to the north of Grand Bahama; the Bermuda High to the northeast of Dorian also collapsed, causing Dorian to stall just north of Grand Bahama. Around the same time, the combination of the eyewall replacement cycle and upwelling of cold water caused Dorian to begin weakening, with Dorian dropping to Category 4 status at 15:00 UTC. Due to the absence of steering currents, Dorian stalled north of Grand Bahama for about a day. Dorian subsequently weakened to a Category 2 storm on September 3, before beginning to move northwestward at 15:00 UTC, parallel to the east coast of Florida, with Dorian's wind field expanding during this time.

While moving northwestward, Dorian gradually reorganized. At 06:00 UTC on September 5, Dorian moved over the warm waters of the Gulf Stream and completed its eyewall replacement cycle, reintensifying into a Category 3 hurricane off the coast of South Carolina. However, several hours later, Dorian encountered high wind shear, causing the storm to weaken to a Category 2 hurricane early on September 6. Then, at 12:35 UTC that day, Dorian made landfall in Cape Hatteras, North Carolina as a Category 2 hurricane, with 1-minute sustained winds of 100 mph (160 km/h) and a minimum central pressure of 956 mb (28.2 inHg). Afterward, Dorian began to transition into an extratropical cyclone as it quickly moved northeastward, completing its transition on September 7. The storm maintained its intensity, due to baroclinic processes, generating Category 2 hurricane-equivalent winds. Several hours later, at 7:05 p.m. AST on September 7 (23:05 UTC on September 7), Dorian made landfall on Sambro Creek, Nova Scotia, as a Category 1-equivalent extratropical storm, before making its fourth and final landfall on the northern part of Newfoundland several hours later. By 11:00 p.m. AST on September 8 (03:00 UTC on September 9), Dorian had moved into the Labrador Sea, 375 miles off the coast, moving northeastward at 24 mph (39 km/h), with wind speeds of 60 mph (97 km/h), maintaining tropical storm-strength winds. As Dorian no longer posed a threat to Atlantic Canada at that time, the NHC issued their final advisory on the storm. On September 10, Dorian's extratropical remnant dissipated off the coast of southern Greenland.

=== Records ===
Most intense landfalling Atlantic hurricanes Intensity is measured solely by central pressure
Rank	Hurricane (Note: Storms with designations in quotation marks are officially unnamed. Tropical storms and hurricanes were not named before the year 1950.)	Season	Landfall pressure
1	"Labor Day"	1935	892 mbar (hPa)
2	Melissa	2025	897 mbar (hPa)
3	Camille	1969	900 mbar (hPa)
3	Gilbert	1988	900 mbar (hPa)
5	Dean	2007	905 mbar (hPa)
6	"Cuba"	1924	910 mbar (hPa)
6	Dorian	2019	910 mbar (hPa)
8	Janet	1955	914 mbar (hPa)
8	Irma	2017	914 mbar (hPa)
10	"Cuba"	1932	918 mbar (hPa)
Sources: HURDAT, AOML/HRD, NHC

With sustained winds of 185 mph (295 km/h), Dorian is the strongest hurricane on record to strike The Bahamas since records began in 1851.

Dorian is tied with the 1935 Labor Day hurricane and Hurricane Melissa in 2025 for the highest sustained winds at landfall in an Atlantic hurricane; by the same metric, it is also the strongest Atlantic hurricane since Wilma in 2005. By central pressure, it was the fifth lowest pressure of a hurricane at landfall. Dorian is one of only two Category 5 hurricanes to make landfall on the Abaco Islands, the other having occurred in 1932, and is the only such storm on record to have impacted Grand Bahama. With Dorian, 2019 became the fourth consecutive year to produce at least one Category 5 hurricane in the North Atlantic. (Note: The four-year period of 2016–2019 broke the record for most consecutive years yielding at least one Category 5 storm.)

Additionally, Dorian featured the highest sustained winds in an Atlantic hurricane recorded at latitude (26.6°N), and was the strongest Atlantic-basin hurricane ever detected outside of the tropics, surpassing Hurricane Irma. Dorian also tracked the least distance in a 24-hour period recorded for an Atlantic major hurricane since Hurricane Betsy in 1965. The storm impacted a single land area as a Category 5 hurricane for the longest duration recorded in the Atlantic basin, with portions of Dorian's eyewall striking Great Abaco Island and Grand Bahama with Category 5 winds for about 22 hours.

== Preparations ==
=== Caribbean ===
Prior to Dorian's arrival in the Lesser Antilles, local governments issued various tropical cyclone warnings and watches across the islands. LIAT cancelled multiple flights across the Lesser Antilles due to the storm and airports across the Virgin Islands temporarily suspended operations. Many of the threatened islands suffered devastating impacts in 2017 from Hurricanes Irma and Maria, lending to greater vigilance. In Barbados, thirty-eight shelters opened island-wide, with 103 residents seeking refuge in them. All public services were suspended for the duration of the storm. Homeless persons were transported to shelter by emergency personnel. On August 26, St. Lucia prime minister Allen Chastanet announced that the nation would "shut down" for the duration of Dorian. In Dominica, Prime Minister Roosevelt Skerrit ordered all public sector workers to remain home and prepare for the storm. The Ministry of Public Works mobilized heavy machinery and the police were placed on high alert.

Puerto Rico Wanda Vázquez Garced declared a state of emergency for the territory on August 27. The following day, the Puerto Rico National Guard was activated to support any relief operations related to the storm. Fears centered around the still-unstable power grid which was largely destroyed by Maria; hundreds of utility workers were deployed to quickly fix any outages. In some areas, power lines remained affixed to palm trees. An estimated 30,000 homes still had damaged roofs from the 2017 hurricane. Territory-wide, 360 shelters with a collective capacity of 48,500 persons opened; 24,000 cots were distributed to these shelters. A state of emergency was declared for the United States Virgin Islands on August 28. Curfews were enacted for the British and United States Virgin Islands for the duration of the hurricane.

=== Bahamas ===
A warning to take immediate cover was issued by the NHC Twitter account, at 11 a.m. EDT on September 1, 2019, as Dorian made landfall in Elbow Cay, Bahamas, at 16:40 UTC as a Category 5 hurricane. Samuel Butler, the Royal Bahamas Police Force assistant commissioner with responsibility for Grand Bahama and the Northern Region (Abaco, Bimini and the Berry Islands), told residents "if you do not heed to the warning [...] we know that the end could be fatal" and Don Cornish, the administrator with the City of Freeport told others seeking shelter at Old Bahama Bay Hotel "that is not a good idea [...] reconsider that decision".

=== Mainland United States ===
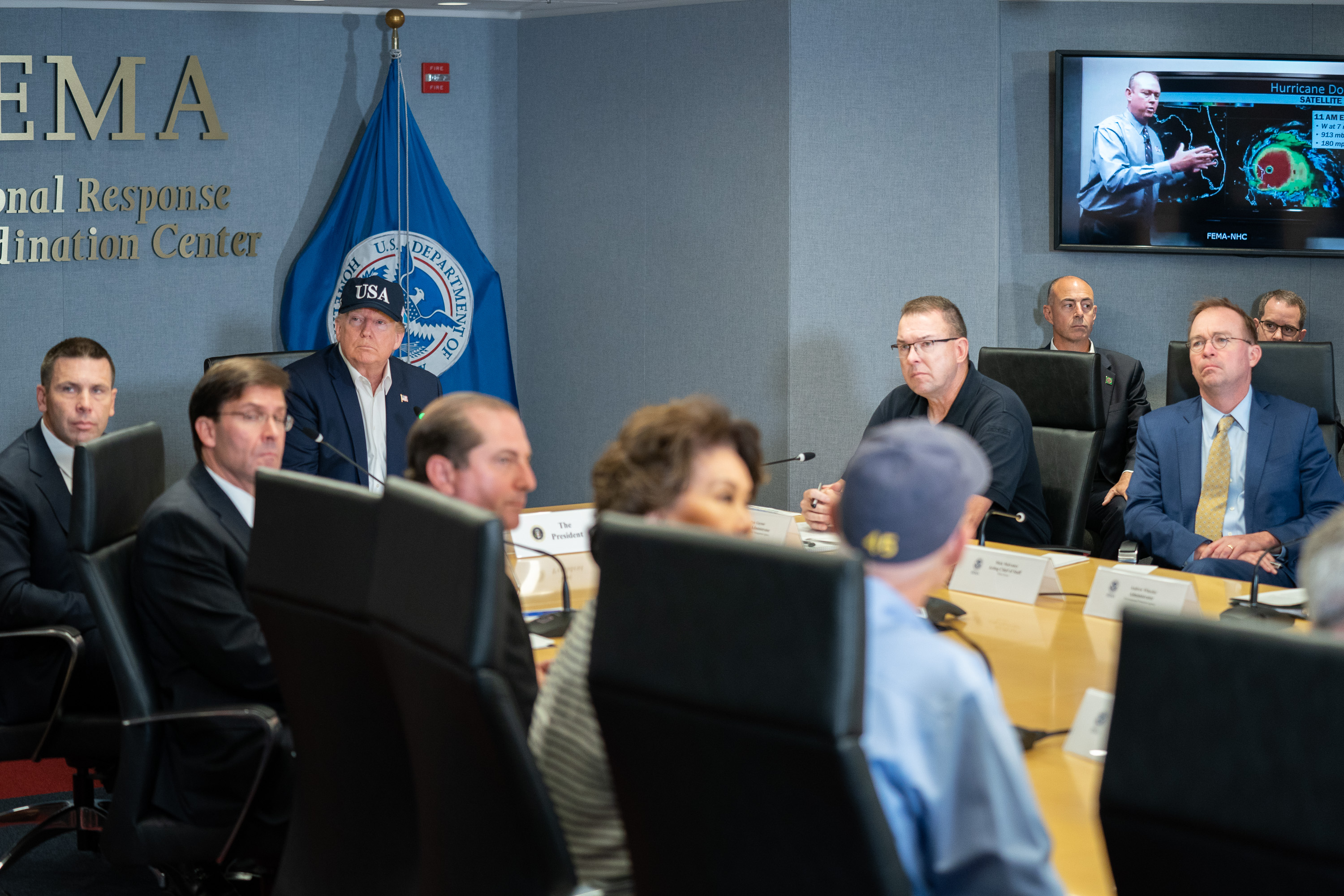
President Trump at a FEMA briefing on the hurricane

==== Florida ====
On August 28, Florida governor Ron DeSantis declared a state of emergency for 26 counties in the hurricane's expected path. This later expanded to the entire state on August 29. First responders distributed sandbags in many counties. Residents began stocking up on supplies throughout the state. In Brevard County, locals worked to trim large tree branches to protect power lines. The University of Central Florida, Stetson University, Rollins College, and Daytona State College cancelled classes between August 30 and September 3. In addition, the Florida Institute of Technology, University of North Florida, Embry-Riddle Aeronautical University, Florida Atlantic University, University of South Florida, Florida International University and the University of Miami cancelled classes for at least one day on top of the three-day Labor Day weekend. The National Park Service shut down Biscayne National Park starting at 1:30pm on August 30.

When it became apparent that Dorian would near the Florida coastline, a tropical storm watch was issued for the Florida east coast from Deerfield Beach to Sebastian Inlet on August 31. It was upgraded to a tropical storm warning a few hours later. A hurricane watch was issued for the area north of Deerfield Beach on September 1, and it was upgraded to a hurricane warning later that day. On the night of September 1, a hurricane watch was issued for Volusia and Broward counties, which was later upgraded to a hurricane warning and extended down the coast.

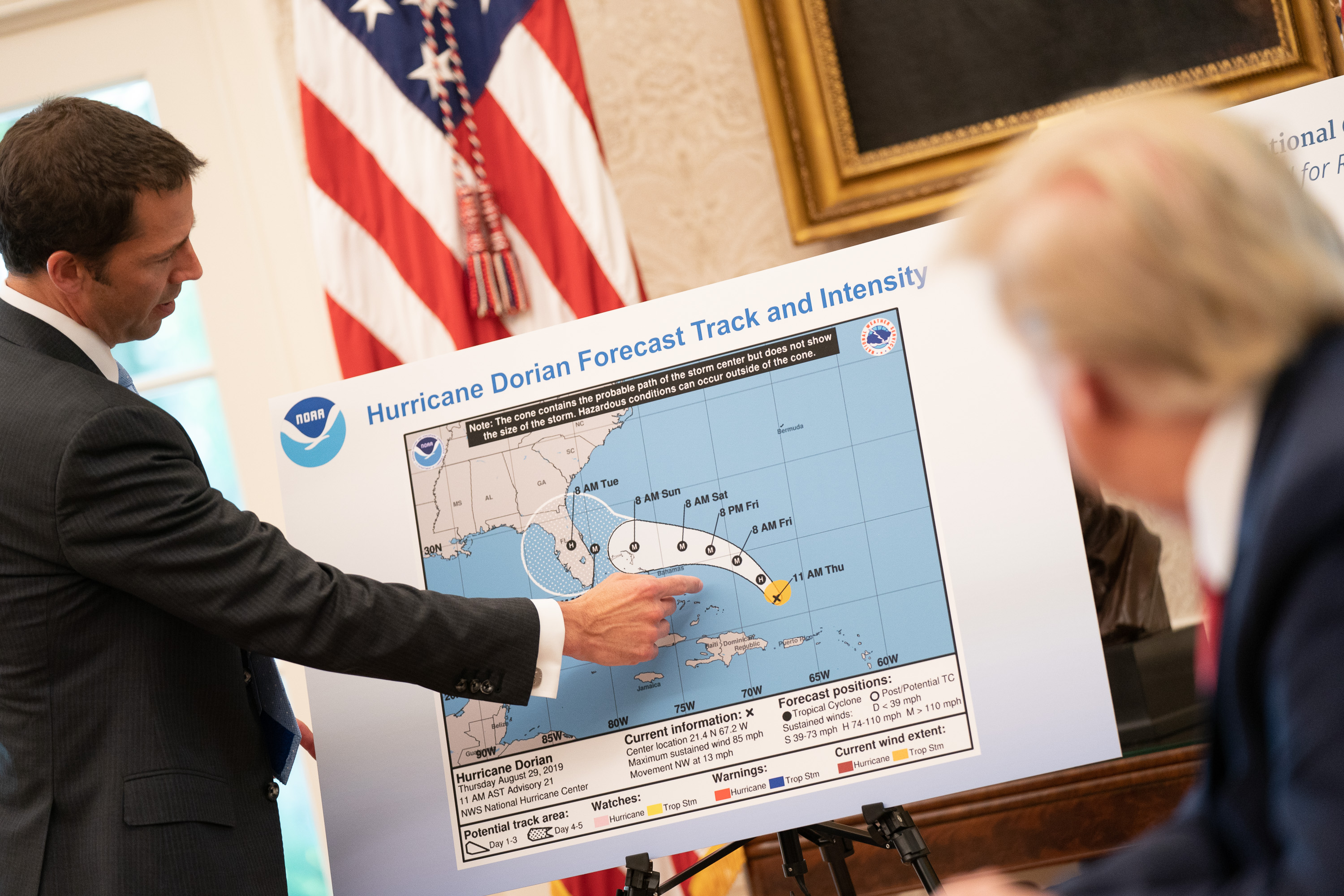
President Trump receives an update on Hurricane Dorian on August 29, 2019.

The Florida State League and Gulf Coast League of Minor League Baseball both cancelled the remainder of the regular season and the playoffs due to the hurricane. In college football, the game between the Florida State Seminoles and the Boise State Broncos originally scheduled for 7 p.m. on August 31 in Jacksonville was moved to 12:00 p.m. on August 31 in Tallahassee to move the game out of the path of the storm. The Orlando Pride of the National Women's Soccer League postponed their game against the Washington Spirit from August 31 to October 5. The Tampa Bay Rays of Major League Baseball also postponed a game against the Baltimore Orioles.

Kay Ivey, Governor of Alabama, announced that the Alabama National Guard would be sending up to fifty support personnel to Florida to aid in recovery efforts. On September 1, Governor DeSantis said that 4,500 members of the United States National Guard had been activated to help aid those affected by Dorian, saying that the hurricane is "way too close for comfort." On Sunday, September 1, Jacksonville, Florida, announced mandatory evacuations for Monday, September 2, taking effect at 8 a.m. The city bridges closed when wind speeds of 40 mph (64 km/h) were recorded. Emergency shelters opened at 10 a.m. on Monday. Broward County Public Schools will be closed Tuesday; all city and government offices, as well as all Duval County Public Schools, St. Johns County Public Schools, and Brevard Public Schools will be closed for Tuesday and Wednesday. Neptune Beach, Jacksonville Beach, and Atlantic Beach will closed Sunday night. On September 2, a curfew was set in place for Flagler County that will start at 7 p.m. Tuesday until further notice. Legoland Florida and parts of Walt Disney World were closed on Tuesday. The parts not closed stayed open until either 2 p.m or 3 p.m. EDT. It was announced on Tuesday that Walt Disney World would fully open back up for Wednesday. Uber started offering fee waivers on roundtrip rides to and from shelters for up to $20. Comcast started offering free Wi-Fi to everyone in Florida, Verizon provided unlimited calling, data, and texting for customers, and AT&T waived data overage charges for residents. On September 3, 115 general shelters and 48 special needs shelters were open across the state of Florida.

==== Georgia ====
On August 28, Georgia governor Brian Kemp declared a state of emergency for coastal counties of Georgia that are in the forecast path of the hurricane, including Brantley, Bryan, Camden, Charlton, Chatham, Effingham, Glynn, Liberty, Long, McIntosh, Pierce and Wayne counties. Governor Kemp added several more counties on Wednesday, September 4, bringing the total number of counties under emergency to 21. Atlanta Motor Speedway opened their campgrounds free of charge to evacuees of Hurricane Dorian. The Georgia State Park System waived parking and pet fees at their parks and made many campgrounds available for evacuees. Georgia State University offered free tickets to their September 7 football game to any evacuees. The College of Coastal Georgia announced campus closures for both Tuesday and Wednesday following Labor Day. Savannah State University also cancelled classes Tuesday. The Georgia coast began experiencing tropical storm force wind gusts and Dorian's outer rain on Wednesday, September 4.

On September 2, a hurricane watch was issued for the south coast of Georgia as Dorian neared. It was later extended to include the whole coast. A tropical storm warning was issued for the entire coast as well.

==== South Carolina ====
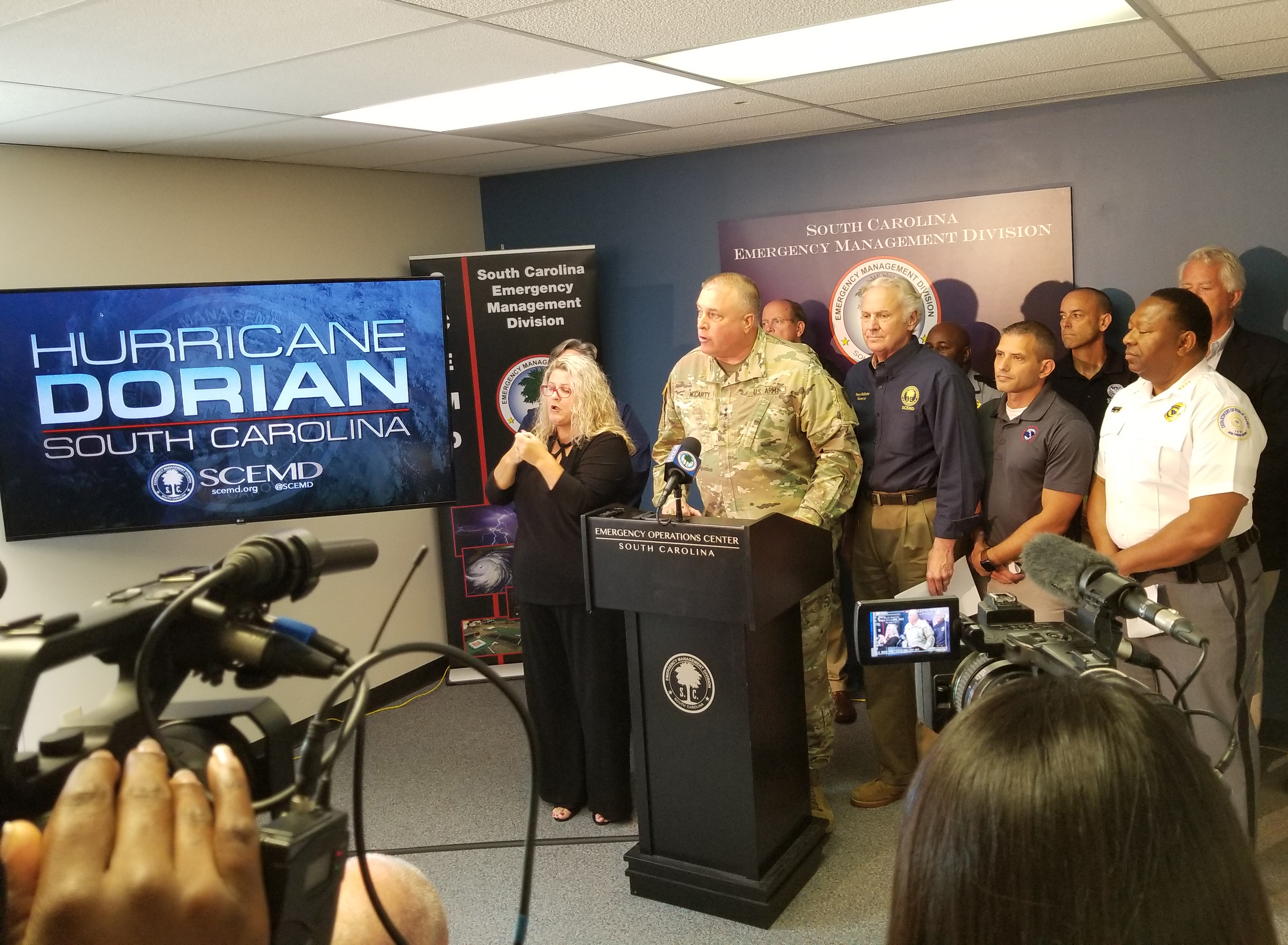
Major General Roy V. McCarty of the South Carolina National Guard and Governor Henry McMaster conduct a briefing on the hurricane.

On August 31, South Carolina governor Henry McMaster declared a state of emergency for the entire state after the path of Dorian shifted to affect South Carolina as a strong hurricane.

On September 1, during a news conference, Governor McMaster announced that mandatory evacuations for Jasper, Beaufort, Colleton, Charleston, Berkeley, Dorchester, Georgetown, and Horry counties will go into effect on Monday, September 2, at noon. State government offices and schools in the counties previously mentioned will be closed until further notice, starting Tuesday. Due to the evacuations, many colleges including College of Charleston and Coastal Carolina University were closed from Tuesday until further notice.

On September 2, as Dorian's track shifted, a hurricane watch was issued for the entire coast. This was later upgraded to a warning as Dorian's expected track took it near the coast.

==== North Carolina ====
On August 30, North Carolina governor Roy Cooper declared a state of emergency for the entire state, due to the hurricane. Charlotte Motor Speedway opened their campgrounds free of charge to evacuees of Hurricane Dorian. In Durham, a large statewide hurricane shelter opened inside the former Sears store at the Northgate Mall.

The University of North Carolina at Wilmington cancelled classes for the week of September 3 and issued a mandatory evacuation of the campus. Over the Labor Day weekend, several school districts announced plans to close ahead of expected evacuations. New Hanover County, Pender County and Brunswick County, all in the Cape Fear region, cancelled public schools on September 4–5, as did several private schools and community colleges.

Early voting for most counties in the special election in North Carolina's 3rd congressional district and for some counties in the special election for the 9th congressional district was also temporarily halted after Wednesday, September 4 as a result, until the North Carolina State Board of Elections could decide what action to take. Ultimately, Karen Brinson Bell, the Board's Executive Director, would opt to use her emergency powers to extend early voting hours for the 9th district through Saturday, September 7, but only in four harder-hit counties that actually closed polling sites, and to have other counties further inland which did not close polling sites end early voting on Friday, September 6, as originally prescribed under state law, in order to make the most of the district's resources. Likewise, the Board extended early voting hours through Saturday for 11 counties in the 3rd district, but not for 6 other affected counties suffering from "power outages, poor conditions or a lack of workers."

Further north, along the Outer Banks in Dare County a mandatory evacuation order was given on September 2, 2019. Visitors and tourists were required to evacuate by noon on September 3, while residents were required to evacuate by 6:00 a.m. on September 4. The state's ports were closed starting at 1:00 p.m. on Wednesday, September 4, until further notice. On September 3, Governor Cooper activated more than 300 members of the North Carolina National Guard to help aid in recovery efforts.

On September 3, a hurricane watch was issued for the entire coastline. It was later upgraded to a warning just a few hours later.

==== Virginia ====
On September 2, Virginia governor Ralph Northam declared a state of emergency ahead of Dorian's anticipated impact on coastal Virginia.

On September 3, a tropical storm watch was issued for the Delmarva Peninsula. This was upgraded to a warning a day later as Dorian's track became more apparent.

==== Maryland and Delaware ====
On September 4, as Dorian's large size was expected to potentially bring tropical storm conditions to southern Maryland and Delaware, in correspondence with the upgrading of the tropical storm watch in effect for the Delmarva to a warning, a tropical storm watch was issued for areas south of Fenwick Island, and areas of the Tidal Potomac River south of Cobb Island, as well as areas south of Drum Point. In Ocean City, Maryland, officials closed the seawall and removed items from the beach and boardwalk; swimming restrictions were also put into place. In Rehoboth Beach, Delaware, swimming restrictions were also put into place, while the portion of the weekend Sandcastle Contest to take place on September 6 was cancelled. Larry Hogan also authorized Maryland's Helicopter Aquatic Rescue Team to help with the North Carolina rescue.

==== New England ====
As Dorian was pulled to the northeast by a passing cold front, the storm passed just 150 miles (240 km) offshore of New England. As a result of this near-miss, a tropical storm watch was issued on September 5 from Woods Hole to Sagamore Beach, including Nantucket and Martha's Vineyard, in Massachusetts. It was upgraded to a warning later the same day. On September 6, a tropical storm warning was issued for the northern coast of Maine from Bar Harbor to Eastport.

==== Elsewhere ====
In Tennessee, Bristol Motor Speedway opened one of their campgrounds free of charge to evacuees of Hurricane Dorian. Along the Jersey Shore in New Jersey, officials in Margate City prepared sandbags in case of flooding from the storm while officials in Brigantine removed lifeguard stands and boats from the beach.

In advance of Dorian, Airbnb offered free housing to evacuees in Florida, Georgia, Alabama, and the Carolinas, valid from August 31 through September 16. AT&T, Verizon, Sprint, and T-Mobile waived charges and/or provided unlimited data to customers within affected states. The American Red Cross Utah Region deployed members to the Southeast U.S. For days in advance of the storm, experts at U.S. Geological Survey warned of the likelihood of rip currents and beach erosion along the Southeast U.S. shoreline. The organization deployed at least 150 storm-tide sensors and 22 other instruments to track the hurricane's effects along the coast.

==== Alabama controversy ====
On September 1, President Donald Trump tweeted that multiple states, including Alabama, "will most likely be hit (much) harder than anticipated." By that date, no weather forecaster was predicting that Dorian would impact Alabama, and the eight National Hurricane Center forecast updates over the preceding 24 hours showed Dorian steering well away from Alabama and moving up the Atlantic coast. Trump was apparently relying on information that was several days old. Twenty minutes later, the Birmingham, Alabama office of the National Weather Service (NWS) issued a tweet that appeared to contradict Trump, saying that Alabama "will NOT see any impacts from Dorian". Over the following days Trump insisted repeatedly and falsely that he had been right about the hurricane threatening Alabama.

President Trump displays the altered map in a video published by the White House on September 4, 2019.

On September 4 in the Oval Office, Trump displayed a modified version of the National Hurricane Center's August 29 diagram of Dorian's projected track. The modification was done with a black Sharpie marker to extend the cone of uncertainty of the hurricane's possible path into southern Alabama. Trump said he did not know how the map came to be modified. The incident resulted in the hashtag "Sharpiegate" trending on Twitter. Later the same day, Trump tweeted a map dated August 28, showing numerous projected paths of Dorian. Trump falsely asserted "almost all models" showed Dorian hitting Alabama, even though the map showed most predicted paths would not enter Alabama.

On September 6, NOAA published an unsigned statement which supported Trump's initial claim that Alabama was a target of the storm and criticized the Birmingham NWS office for denying it. It was later revealed that NOAA had been ordered to issue such a statement by Commerce Secretary Wilbur Ross, and that he had been told by Acting White House Chief of Staff Mick Mulvaney to get NOAA to support Trump's original statement that Alabama was threatened. This direct White House involvement raised questions about political influence over NOAA, and is under investigation by multiple agencies including NOAA's acting chief scientist, the inspector general of the Commerce Department, and the House of Representatives committee which oversees NOAA.

=== Atlantic Canada ===
As Dorian approached Atlantic Canada, hurricane and tropical storm warnings were issued for Nova Scotia, Prince Edward Island, and Newfoundland. On September 6, the Halifax Regional Municipality encouraged residents living along the eastern shores of Nova Scotia to evacuate, citing expected high winds, heavy rainfall, and waves up to 15 m (49 ft) in height. The Nova Scotia Emergency Management Office implored residents to secure easily dislodged objects to prevent high winds from turning them into projectiles, drawing comparisons to Hurricane Juan in 2003. Nova Scotia Power set up an emergency operations center and mobilized 1,000 personnel, including forestry crews, damage assessors, as well as power line technicians from adjacent provinces, to prepare for Dorian's impacts. WestJet, Air Canada, and Porter Airlines issued travel advisories for the weekend and waived rebooking fees for flights to and from affected areas.

== Impacts ==
Deaths and damage by territory
Territory		Fatalities	Missing	Damage (2019 USD)	Ref
Lesser Antilles		0	0	Unknown	
The Bahamas		74	245	$3.4 billion	
United States	Puerto Rico	1	0	Unknown	
United States	Florida	6	0	≥$1.6 billion	
United States	Georgia	0	0	≥$1.6 billion	
United States	South Carolina	0	0	≥$1.6 billion	
United States	North Carolina	3	0	≥$1.6 billion	
United States	Massachusetts	0	0	≥$1.6 billion	
United States	Maine	0	0	≥$1.6 billion	
Canada		0	0	$78.9 million	
Totals:		84	245	$5.08 billion	

=== Caribbean ===
From August 26 to 29, Dorian produced damaging winds and heavy rain across the eastern Caribbean. In Barbados, winds reached 55 mph (89 km/h), downing trees and power lines. Isolated interruptions to power occurred on St. Lucia; no damage occurred otherwise in the nation. In Martinique, heavy rains—peaking at 102 mm (4.0 in) in Rivière-Pilote—and winds up to 61 mph (98 km/h) caused some damage, though overall damage was negligible. Heavy showers in Dominica left multiple communities without power and water. Rainfall extended north to Guadeloupe were accumulations reached 121 mm (4.8 in) in Matouba. Striking the Virgin Islands as an intensifying hurricane, Dorian brought strong winds and heavy rains to the region. Buck Island, just south of Saint Thomas, experienced sustained winds of 82 mph (132 km/h) and a peak gust of 111 mph (179 km/h). Wind gusts on Saint Thomas reached 75 mph (121 km/h). Island-wide blackouts occurred on Saint Thomas and Saint John, while 25,000 customers lost power on Saint Croix. The high winds downed trees across the islands. Along the coast, multiple boats broke from their moorings and washed ashore. Some flooding occurred on Tortola in the British Virgin Islands. Downed trees knocked out power to some residences on Virgin Gorda. Because the hurricane moved farther northeast than initially anticipated, its effects in Puerto Rico were relatively limited. A man in Bayamón died when he fell off his roof trying to clean drains in advance of the storm.

=== The Bahamas ===
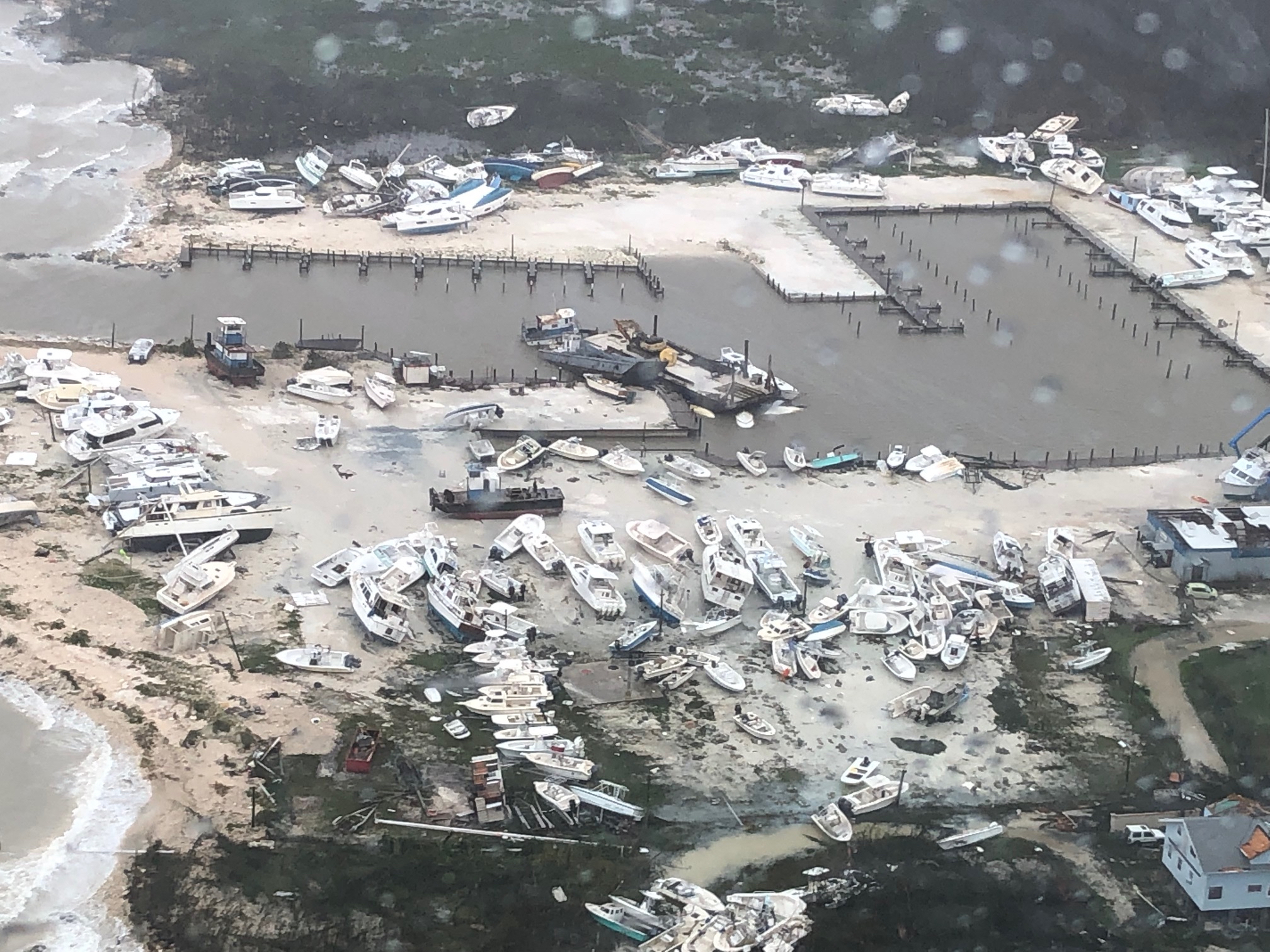
Hurricane Dorian's destruction in The Bahamas

Top 5 Costliest Bahamian hurricanes
Rank	Hurricane	Season	Damage	Ref
1	Dorian	2019	$3.4 billion	
2	Sandy	2012	$700 million	
3	Irma	2017	$685 million	
4	Matthew	2016	$580 million	
5	Michelle	2001	$300 million	
5	Frances	2004	$300 million	

Increased tides were experienced in The Bahamas ahead of the storm, with rip currents occurring as well. On September 1, 2019, hurricane conditions arrived in some of the Abaco Islands. A few hours later, destructive conditions arrived, with Hurricane Dorian making landfall as a Category 5 hurricane at 16:40 UTC, becoming the strongest hurricane in modern records to strike the northwestern Bahamas. Around 12:30 pm AST, Category 5 winds arrived at The Bahamas with the eyewall. Gusts of over 200 mph (320 km/h) also occurred. Devastating storm surge of up to 23 feet swept away many buildings and submerged a large part of the affected areas. At 7:00 (UTC) on September 2, 2019, Grand Bahama International Airport was underwater. Minister of Agriculture Michael Pintard reported an estimated storm tide of 20 to 25 ft (6.1 to 7.6 m) at his home on Grand Bahama. The Bahamas prime minister, Hubert Minnis, said "This is a deadly [...] monster storm".

Marsh Harbour received "catastrophic damage", according to an ABC News team. Over 75% of the homes had been damaged, Marsh Harbour International Airport's runway was underwater, there was significant flooding on streets and beaches, damage to trees and with some home's roofs ripped off entirely. The scene was described by an ABC reporter as "pure hell". An eight-year-old boy drowned in the storm surge, while the boy's sister was also reported to be missing. Four other people, along with the eight-year-old boy, were confirmed dead on the Abaco Islands, the prime minister told reporters on Monday. By Wednesday, the death toll had been raised to twenty, according to the prime minister. This soon increased to forty-three by Saturday. However, a Bahamas newspaper suggested that the actual death toll could be over 3,000.

The local animal shelters were hit hard by the storm with the Humane Society of Grand Bahama's experiencing stronger storm surges than expected. Workers had attempted to help the animals before retreating to the attic crawl space but almost half of the 190 dogs in their care died in the flooding and some of the 85 cats died as well. The numbers of animals has varied with earlier reports claiming that there were 135 dogs and 155 cats in the shelters care, with 80 cats and 90 dogs surviving.

It is feared that the Bahama nuthatch may have been wiped out by Dorian, as it caused catastrophic damage to the Bahamian pineyards. A 2020 post-hurricane assessment by the IUCN Red List still entertains the probability of the species being extant, although likely having a maximum population size of only 50 individuals and likely well below that, and indicates that extensive surveys for the species will be needed to confirm its status.

The International Federation of Red Cross and Red Crescent Societies (IFRC) reported that as many as 13,000 homes were damaged or destroyed on Abaco Island. Extensive flooding is also believed to have caused water wells to be contaminated with seawater, creating an urgent need for clean water. Total damage in the country reached $3.4 billion. Property damage accounted for $2.5 billion; the nation suffered $717 million in economic losses; and $221 million was required for debris removal and cleaning a large oil spill.

Around 11:24 UTC on September 2, 2019, total power was lost on the island of New Providence, the following day at 1:50 (UTC) 40% of power had been restored.

Tropical storm conditions continued into Monday, September 2. At 2 p.m. EDT, a sustained wind of 56 mph (90 km/h) and a gust of 69 mph (110 km/h) at a NOAA Coastal Marine observing site at Settlement Point on the west end of Grand Bahama Island.

On September 3, Prime Minister Hubert Minnis stated, "Our urgent task will be to provide food, water, shelter, safety and security. Additional food will be delivered by NEMA tomorrow." He went on to say that Dorian was "the greatest national crisis in our country's history." The United Nations projected that as of Saturday, September 7, at least 70,000 people had been left homeless on Grand Bahama and the Abaco Islands.

On Thursday, September 12, over 1,300 people were missing or unaccounted for in The Bahamas, a number which plummeted from 2,500 over the previous two weeks. On September 26, the number of people missing in The Bahamas dropped to 600, while the official death toll rose to 56. By February 2020, the death toll rose to 74; including 63 in Abaco and 11 in Grand Bahama, with 282 people still reported as missing.

=== Mainland United States ===
The National Centers for Environmental Information estimated total damage in the United States to be in excess of $1.6 billion.

==== Florida ====
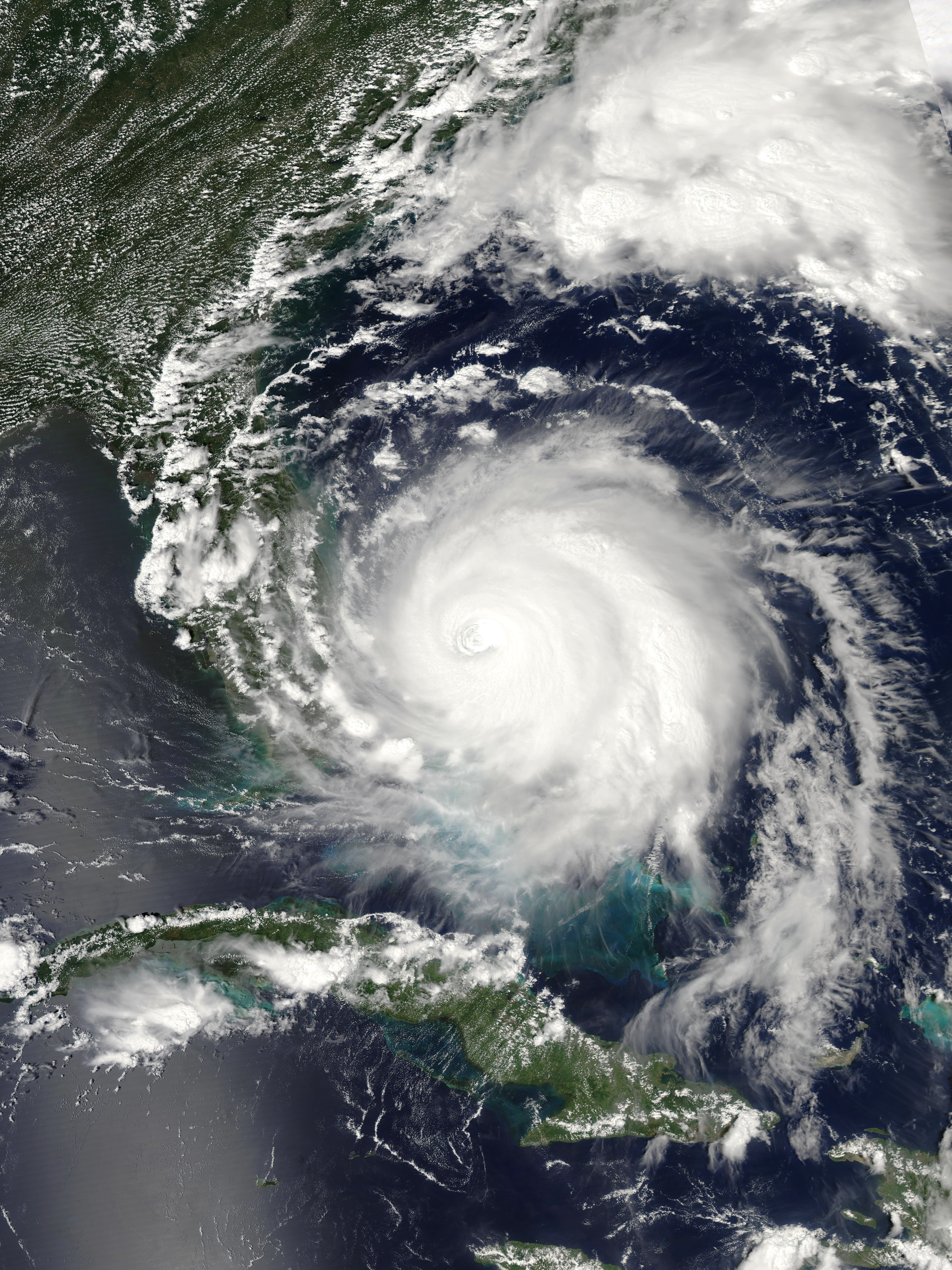
Dorian off of Florida's east coast on September 2

On September 2, Florida began experiencing tropical storm-force winds. At 18:00 UTC (2 p.m. EDT), the pier in Juno Beach recorded a wind gust of 48 mph (75 km/h). One death occurred in the central coast barrier island town of Indiatlantic, when a man fell three stories while boarding up his home. During September 3 and 4, tropical storm force winds continued to move up the east coast of Florida, with the storm's eye staying about 100 miles away from landfall.

Many areas along the Atlantic coast reporting gusts of over tropical storm force, especially at Cape Canaveral. At 8 am EDT on September 4 at St. Augustine Beach, a sustained wind of 46 miles per hour (74 km/h) and a gust of 59 miles per hour (95 km/h) was reported. In Jacksonville, the city experienced tropical storm force winds on September 4 which blew around debris and knocked out power. A lifeguard rescued a woman pulled out by a rip current in Jacksonville Beach while other swimmers were ordered out of the water. Hurricane Dorian also caused three indirect deaths in Florida. A landscaper was electrocuted to death while trimming trees at a hotel in Naples, while two other people died during preparations for storm.

==== The Carolinas ====
A fatality occurred in North Carolina on September 2, when an 85-year-old man fell off a ladder while boarding up his home, and another was confirmed dead on September 6, a 65-year-old man after he also fell off a ladder. On September 5, several tornadoes spawned by Dorian were sighted in Onslow County. At around 9 a.m. EST that day a tornado touched down in the town of Emerald Isle, causing severe damage to a recreational vehicle park and some mobile homes. In total, 25 tornadoes were spawned by Dorian in North Carolina. Flooding from the storm washed out a road in Sampson County. On the same day, tropical-storm force winds had arrived in South Carolina. Dorian also produced some flooding, especially in Charleston. Over 160,000 buildings lost power. Two confirmed tornadoes were spawned in South Carolina by Dorian, including a tornado that was reported in Little River that damaged trees, roofing, and lifted a car. At the same day another tornado was reported in Myrtle Beach. On the next day, Dorian made landfall in Cape Hatteras, North Carolina as a Category 2 storm. Several people on Ocracoke Island were trapped in their attics by flooding from the 4-to-7-foot (1.2 to 2.1 m) storm surge, requiring rescue by boats. People were airlifted off the island to shelters on the mainland while food and water were brought in to residents on the island. NC 12 along Ocracoke Island suffered damage from flooding. More than 190,000 people in North Carolina lost power from the storm. The National Park Service Incident Management Team also reported that wave erosion from Dorian reshaped parts of the barrier islands in the Outer Banks. High waves swept away a herd of cows from Cedar Island; three cows survived after being carried 4 mi (6.4 km) away to Core Banks. A third fatality occurred on September 7 when a man died from injuries sustained in a chainsaw accident while he was trying to clear a fallen tree.

==== Elsewhere ====
Fifty-five aircraft from military installations in Virginia and the Carolinas were evacuated to Pensacola in order to avoid the hurricane. Waves from the hurricane caused erosion to the beaches in Delaware. In Bethany Beach, the waves narrowed the beaches and also damaged dune fencing. The Jersey Shore saw gusty winds and rough waves from the storm. The State of Alabama received no rainfall or wind effects from Hurricane Dorian during its track up the continental coast. More than 3 in (76 mm) of rain fell in parts of Down East Maine. Gusts reached 40 to 50 mph (64 to 80 km/h) in coastal areas of the state, leaving hundreds of homes and businesses without power. Acadia National Park closed Sand Beach and Thunder Hole as a precaution and warned people to keep their distance from the waves.

=== Atlantic Canada ===
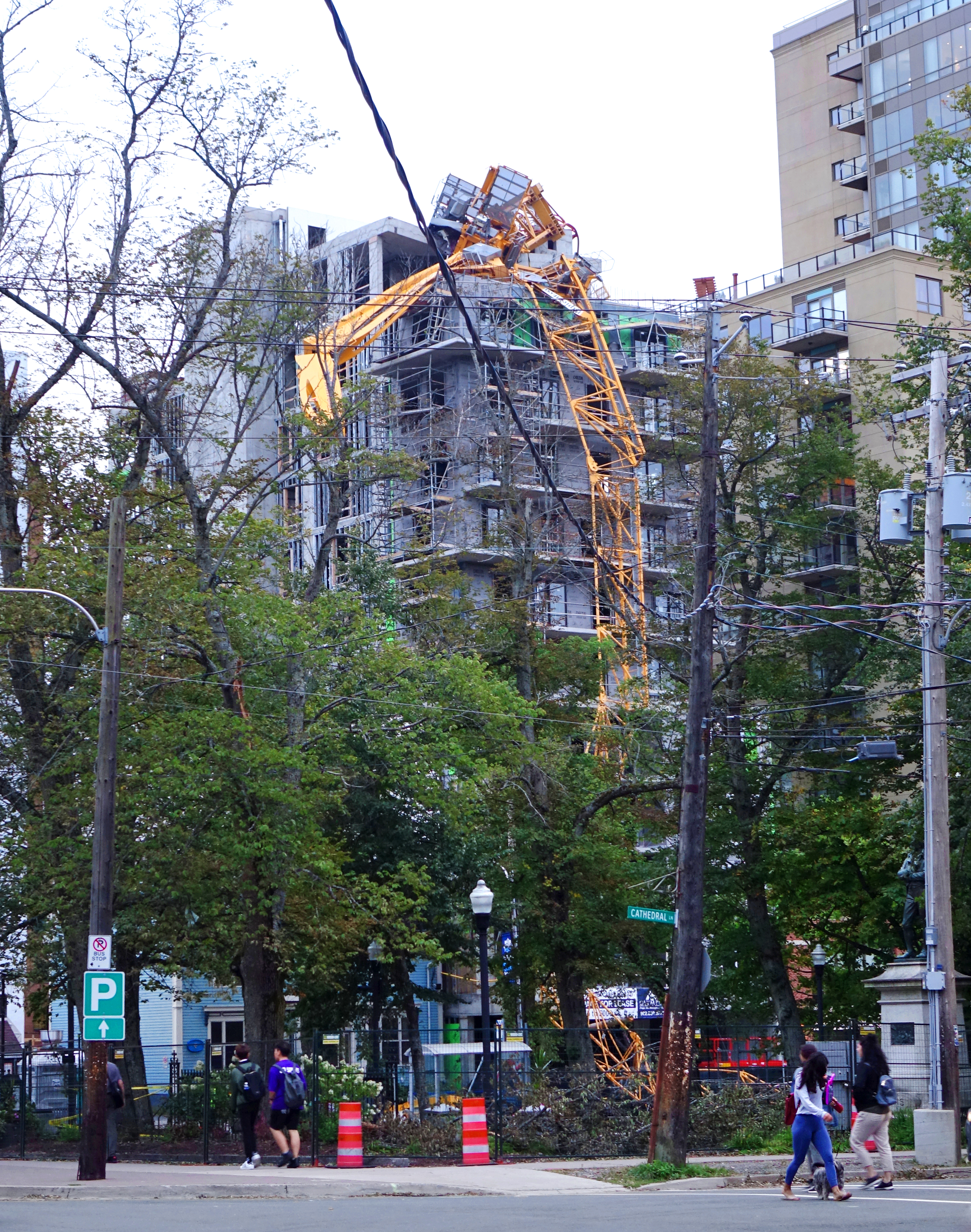
Crane toppled by Dorian's hurricane-force winds on September 7, in Halifax, Nova Scotia

On September 7, 2019, at 5 p.m. EDT, Nova Scotia started to experience hurricane-force winds. By 7 p.m. EDT, the center of the storm passed over Halifax, while tropical storm conditions were being felt in Prince Edward Island. By September 8, approximately 412,000 customers in Nova Scotia lost power, accounting for approximately 80 percent of the province, as well as 80,000 customers in New Brunswick. Flooding was reported, roofs were torn off buildings, and a crane collapsed onto a building being constructed. The collapse led to local evacuations for some residents and businesses. First responders evacuated 31 persons from a campground in Prince Edward Island early Sunday morning, on September 7, as it was inundated by storm surge. Though Dorian was post-tropical on arrival, winds off the coast of Nova Scotia were estimated to reach 155 km/h (96 mph), equivalent to a Category 2 hurricane. Rainfall totals were highest in Mahone Bay, Nova Scotia, which received 161 mm (6.3 in) of rain. Various stations across Nova Scotia and Prince Edward Island recorded rainfall amounts in excess of 130 mm (5.1 in). Several stations recorded winds higher than 130 km/h (81 mph), with the highest gusts recorded in Grand Étang, Nova Scotia, at 155 km/h (96 mph). In the Cavendish area of Prince Edward Island National Park, 80 percent of trees suffered damage from the high winds, and storm surge caused 2 metres (6.6 ft) of coastal erosion. Winds of 120 km/h (75 mph) also affected the Magdalen Islands of Quebec in the Gulf of Saint Lawrence. Seven thousand customers were without power there at one point, representing nearly all customers on the islands. On the night of September 7, a buoy off the coast of Newfoundland detected a 100 ft (30 m) rogue wave, which had been generated by Dorian's winds. Insurance damage across the region was estimated at C$105 million (US$78.9 million), with power grid damage in Nova Scotia alone accounting for $39 million (Canadian) by Nova Scotia Power, making it the costliest storm in Nova Scotia Power's history.

== Aftermath ==
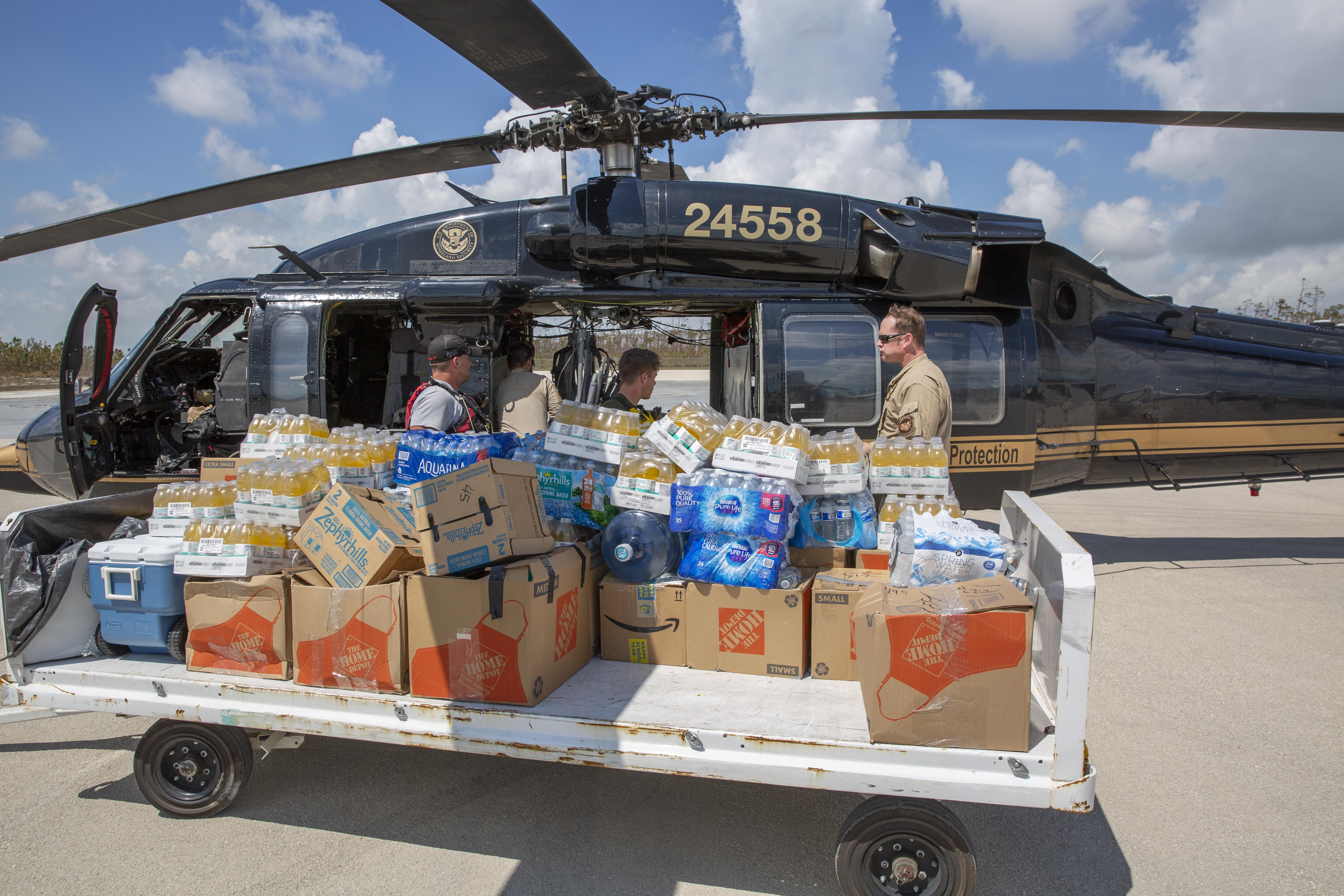
U.S. Customs and Border Protection agents deliver relief supplies to The Bahamas.

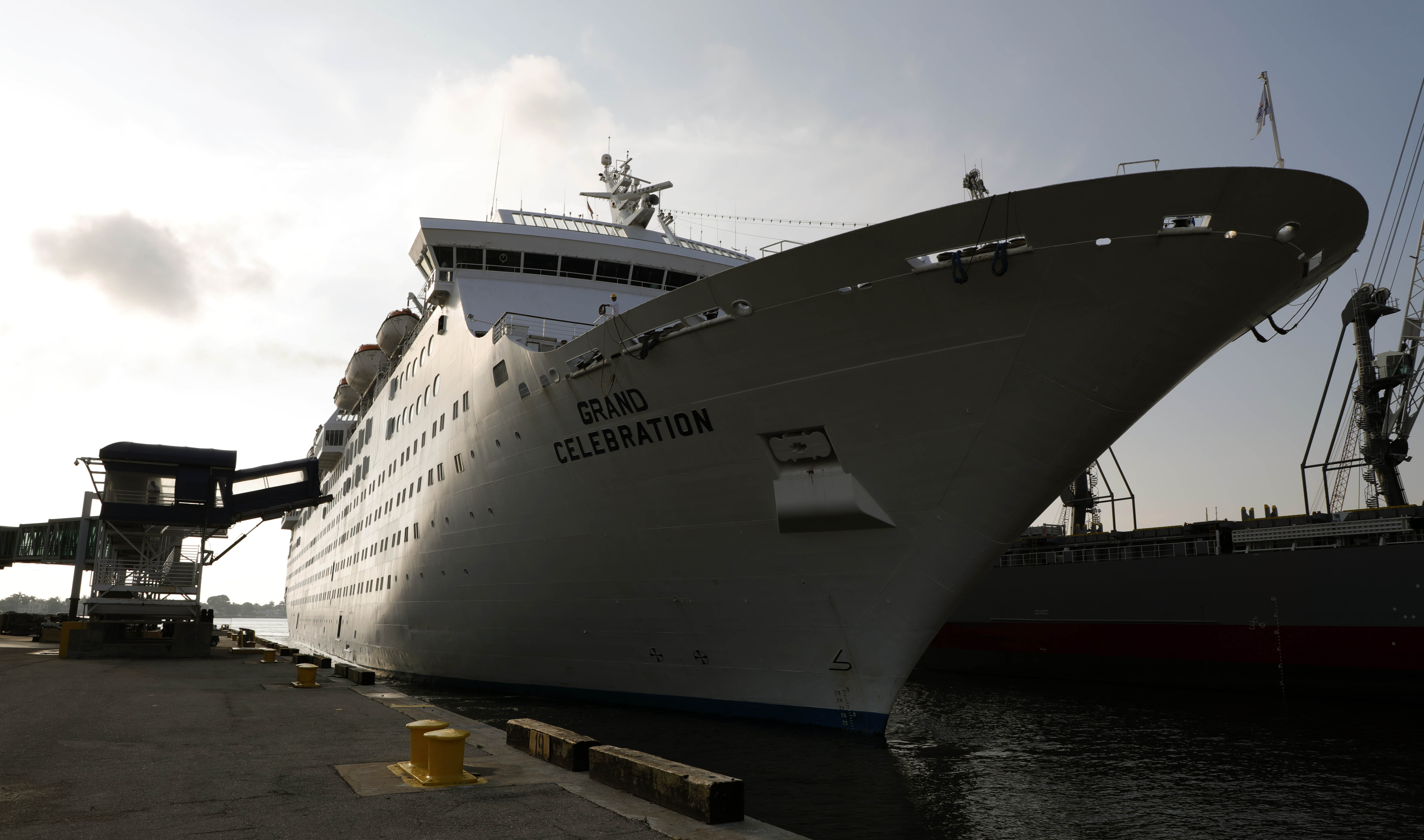
Grand Celebration helped transport evacuees from The Bahamas to Florida.

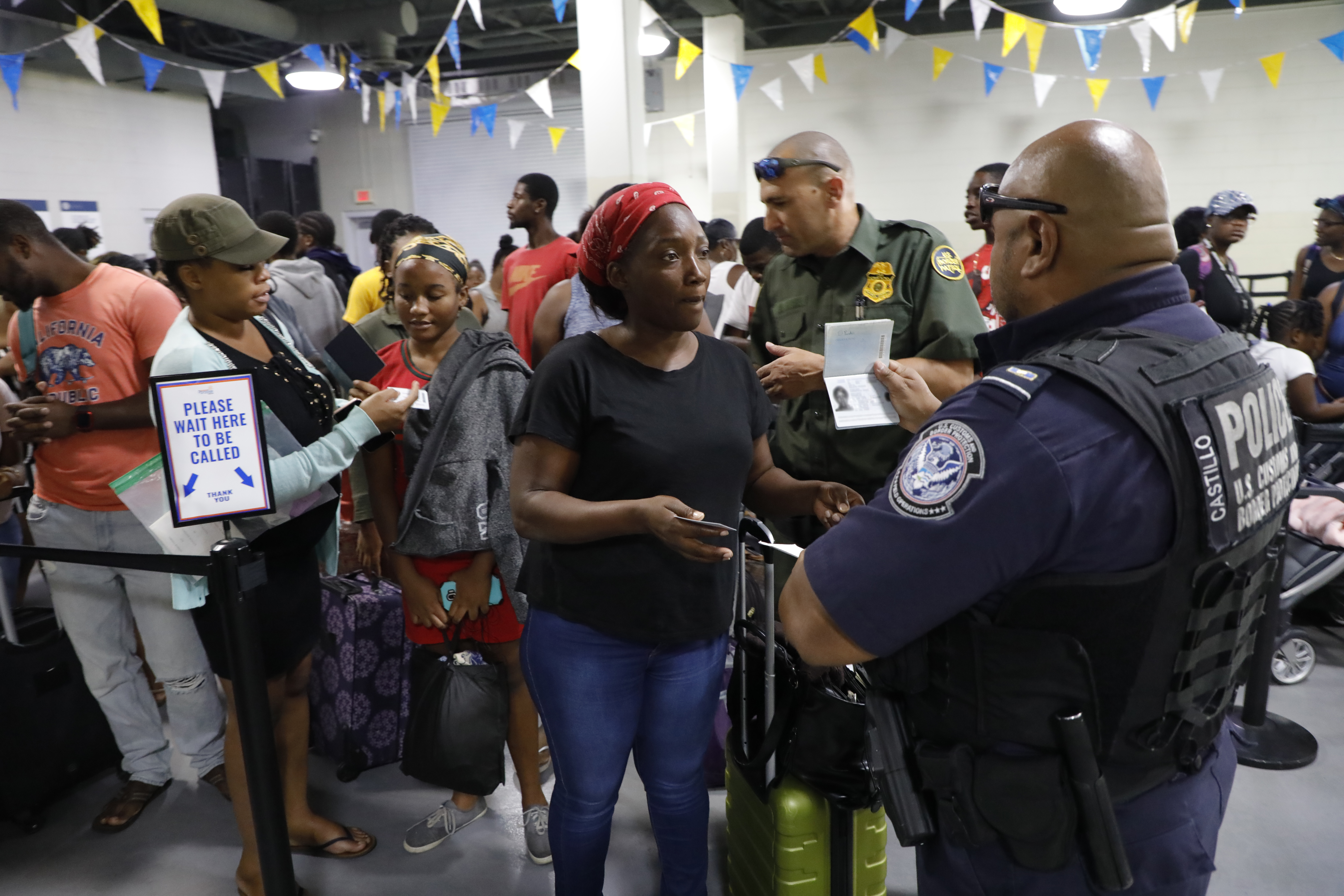
U.S. Customs agents examine documents for evacuees.

Bahamian prime minister Hubert Minnis praised the United States for "assisting us with all of our needs." President Donald Trump assured The Bahamian prime minister of help in relief efforts. In September 2019, President Donald Trump stated that his administration is planning to extend temporary protected status to immigrants from the hurricane-hit Bahamas. There was confusion with the statement however, with the acting Commissioner of US Customs and Border Protection Mark Morgan stating that the US would "...accept anyone on humanitarian reasons...". Shortly after his statement Trump stated that no one would be allowed in without proper documentation, claiming "...The Bahamas had some tremendous problems with people going to The Bahamas that weren't supposed to be there" and the need to protect the US against gang members and drug dealers.

The Bahamas Paradise, Royal Caribbean, Norwegian, and Carnival cruise lines started sending water bottles and meals to The Bahamas. The Grand Celebration offered to give a chance for evacuees to evacuate to Florida free of charge, given they have the proper documentation. On September 7, the Grand Celebration helped bring more than 1,100 evacuees to Florida. The company stated in a press release that "the cruise line spent nearly a full day clearing potential evacuees, including vetting their visa and passport documentation." The Royal Caribbean International also helped deliver more than 43,000 water bottles and 10,000 meals to The Bahamas.

The United States branch of the Jehovah's Witnesses also participated in the relief efforts, delivering 100+ tons of relief supplies and 700 volunteer workers to the affected areas.

The evacuation process was not without confusion as many evacuees who had boarded the Balearia Caribbean, were not told until the vessel had almost departed that anyone traveling to the United States without a visa must disembark. This caused many, including families with children to disembark. Blame for the confusion was placed on US Customs and Border Protection by the vessel who claimed to have been told that visa's were not necessary, and on the vessel by the US Customs and Border Protection who stated the vessel did not coordinate properly.

As the hurricane had damaged or destroyed a majority of the Humane Society of Grand Bahama and killed many of the animals in its care, a GoFundMe was created in order to help renovate and aid the organization's locations. Surviving animals were airlifted to the United States in order to disperse them to other shelters while the organization was stabilized.

About 300 military personnel from the Canadian Armed Forces were deployed to the Halifax area to assist with recovery. Parks Canada estimated that 80 per cent of the trees in the western, Cavendish segment of Prince Edward Island National Park were downed by the storm, as well as causing 2 m (6.6 ft) of coastal erosion. All public schools in Nova Scotia were closed on September 9 and 10. Public schools were closed across Prince Edward Island on the 9th, and most re-opened the next day.

News reports stated that the Bahama nuthatch has been wiped out by Dorian as it caused impact on the Bahamian pineyards.

== Retirement ==
Due to the disastrous effects of the hurricane, particularly in The Bahamas, the World Meteorological Organization (WMO) retired the name Dorian from its rotating name lists in April 2021, and it will never again be used to name an Atlantic tropical cyclone. It was replaced with Dexter for the 2025 season. It was initially expected that Dorian would be retired in the spring of 2020. However, the WMO's 2020 hurricane committee meeting was held online and shortened due to the COVID-19 pandemic, which resulted in insufficient time for discussing potential retirements and replacements of tropical cyclone names.

== See also ==
- List of Category 5 Atlantic hurricanes
- List of Canada hurricanes
- Tropical cyclones in 2019
- Timeline of the 2019 Atlantic hurricane season
- 1928 Okeechobee hurricane – passed through the Lesser Antilles and The Bahamas as a major hurricane in September 1928, before curving northwards over Florida
- Hurricane Andrew (1992) – took a similar track and struck The Bahamas and south Florida as a Category 5 hurricane
- Hurricane Floyd (1999) – took a similar track and affected The Bahamas and the US East Coast
- Hurricane Joaquin (2015) – A Category 4 hurricane that also stalled over The Bahamas
- Hurricane Matthew (2016) – formed near Barbados and affected the Windward Islands, Grand Bahama, Florida and the Outer Banks in late September 2016
- Hurricane Isaias (2020) – affected similar areas
- Hurricane Nicole (2022) – affected similar areas
