= TSF =

TSF may refer to:

== Broadcasting ==
- TSF, a Portuguese radio station
- TSF Jazz, a French jazz radio station, previously known as TSF
- Télécoms Sans Frontières, a humanitarian organization specializing in emergency telecommunications
- Tip-sleeve (TS) female, an audio jack in the phone connector (audio) family
- Télégraphie Sans Fil, an old French time for Wireless communication communication

== Computing ==
- Text Services Framework, a COM framework and API in Windows XP and later Windows operating systems
- Timing synchronization function, in IEEE 802.11 wireless local area network (WLAN) standard to fulfill timing synchronization among users

== Medicine ==
- Taylor Spatial Frame, an external fixator for treating fractures
- Triceps skin fold, a measurement of the upper arm

== Other ==
- Tactical Surface Fighter, a kind of mecha from the series Muv-Luv
- Tailings Storage Facility, an earth-fill embankment dam used to store slurry waste left from mining operations
- Taoyuan Sports Federation, a sport organization in Taiwan
- The Sauce Factory, an independent record label founded by American rapper Sauce Walka
- The Stafford Foundation, a non-profit organization
- Tons per square foot, pressure unit
- Treviso Airport, IATA airport code
- Turkish Chess Federation (Turkish: Türkiye Satranç Federasyonu)
