= Effects of Hurricane Dorian in the Bahamas =

Hurricane Dorian
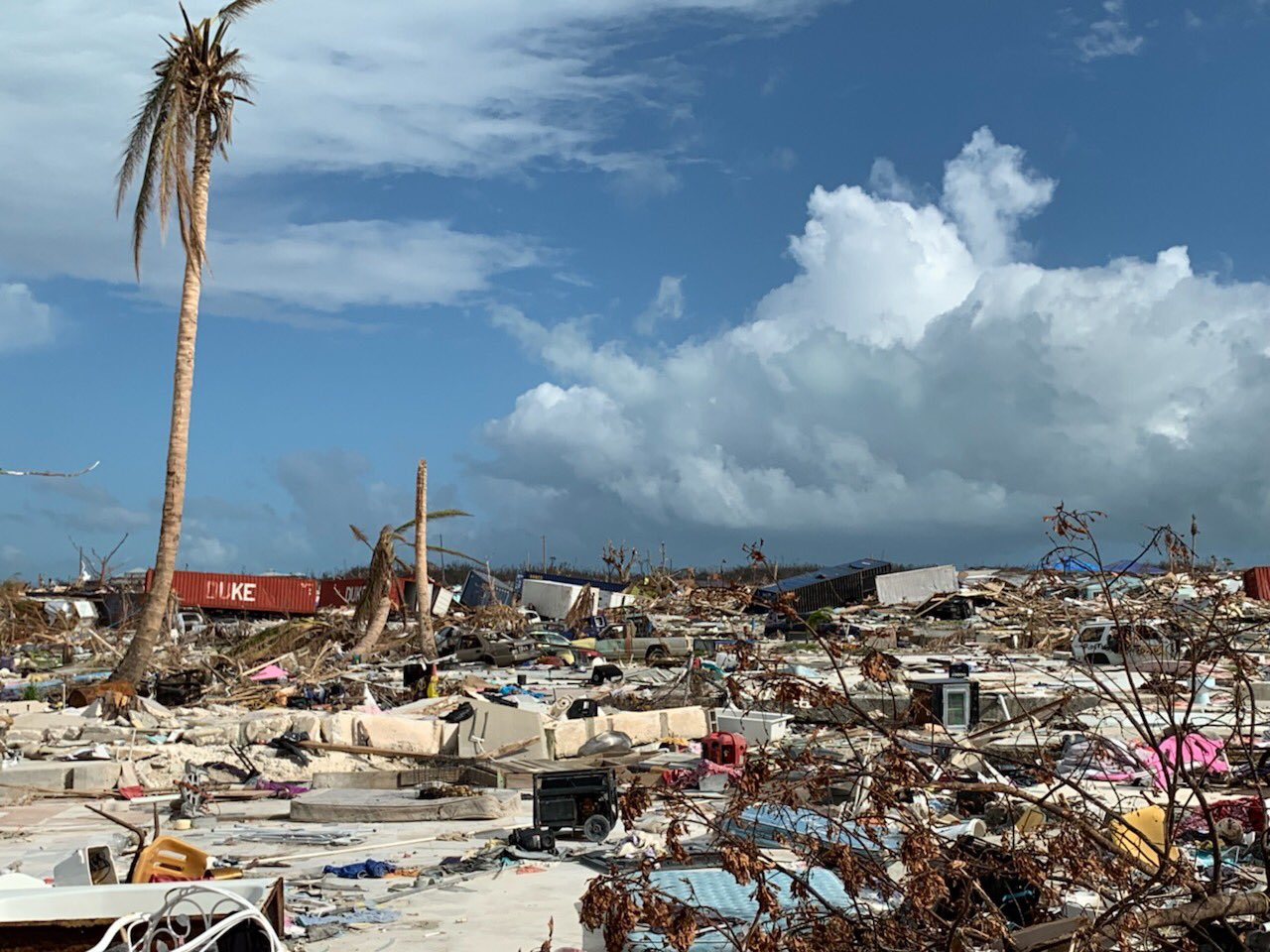
- The aftermath in The Bahamas after Dorian made landfall on 1 September 2019.

Meteorological history
- Duration: 1–3 September 2019

Category 5 major hurricane
- 1-minute sustained (SSHWS/NWS)
- Highest winds: 185 mph (295 km/h)
- Lowest pressure: 910 mbar (hPa); 26.87 inHg

Overall effects
- Fatalities: ≥74
- Missing: 281
- Damage: $3.4 billion (2019 USD)
- Areas affected: Northwestern Bahamas (mainly the Abaco Islands and Grand Bahama)
- Part of the 2019 Atlantic hurricane season
- History: Meteorological history; Effects: The Caribbean; The Bahamas; The Carolinas; Atlantic Canada; Alabama controversy; Other wikis: Commons: Dorian images

Hurricane Dorian became the costliest hurricane in the Bahamas on record. It struck the Abaco Islands as a Category 5 hurricane on 1 September, and a day later hit Grand Bahama Island at the same category. The hurricane then stalled over Grand Bahama for another day, finally pulling away from the island on 3 September. Damage amounted to US$3.4 billion, and there were at least 74 deaths in the country. Another 282 people were left missing after the hurricane.

== Preparations ==
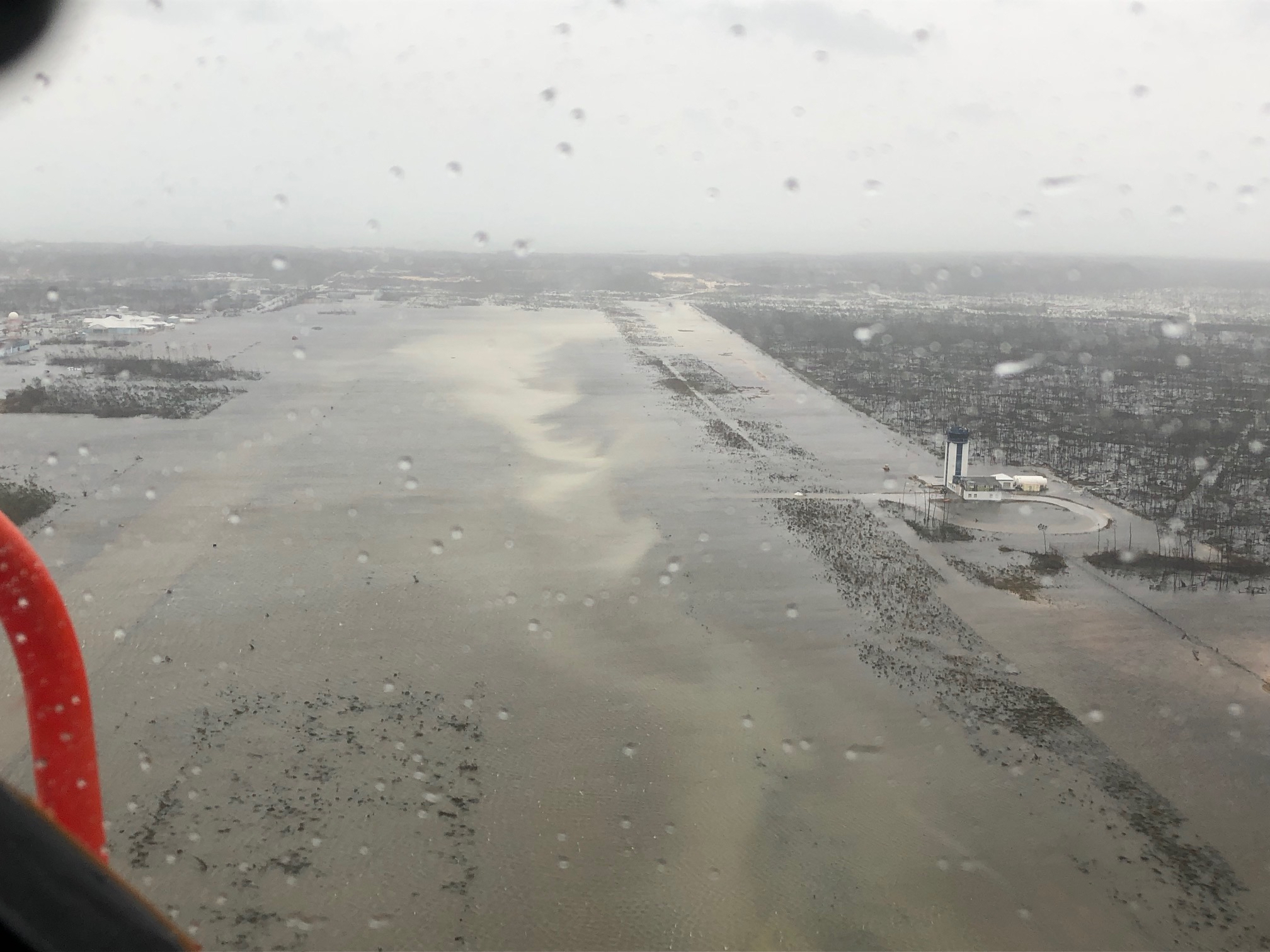
Marsh Airport on Great Abaco Island completely destroyed following Hurricane Dorian.

As early as 26 August, the National Hurricane Center (NHC) warned for the potential of then–Tropical Storm Dorian to affect The Bahamas within five days, noting uncertainty due to potential interaction with Hispaniola. By 28 August, the NHC was forecasting for Dorian to pass near the northern Bahamas as a major hurricane. On 30 August, the government of The Bahamas issued a hurricane watch, and later that day a hurricane warning, for the northwestern Bahamas, including the Abacos, Berry Islands, Bimini, Eleuthera, Grand Bahama Island, and New Providence. A hurricane watch was also issued for Andros Island. The warnings were downgraded after Dorian moved away from the country on 3 September.

Forced evacuations were issued for the Abacos and Grand Bahama on 31 August as Dorian intensified while tracking towards The Bahamas. In low-lying cays, government officials went from door to door urging residents to move inland. Skiffs rented by The Bahamian government shuttled residents of outlying fishing communities to McLean's Town in Grand Bahama. Most major resorts were forced to close. Nine hurricane shelters were opened on Grand Bahama and 15 shelters were opened on the Abacos. Some chose to shelter at resorts instead, despite warnings by government officials that the buildings were unsafe. Prime Minister of The Bahamas Hubert Minnis warned people to "not be foolish and try to brave out this hurricane", later adding that those that did not evacuate "are placing themselves in extreme danger and can expect a catastrophic consequence". Airports in the Abacos, Grand Bahama, and Bimini were closed by 1 September. Government workers were ordered to stay indoors once winds outside reached tropical storm-force.

== Impact ==
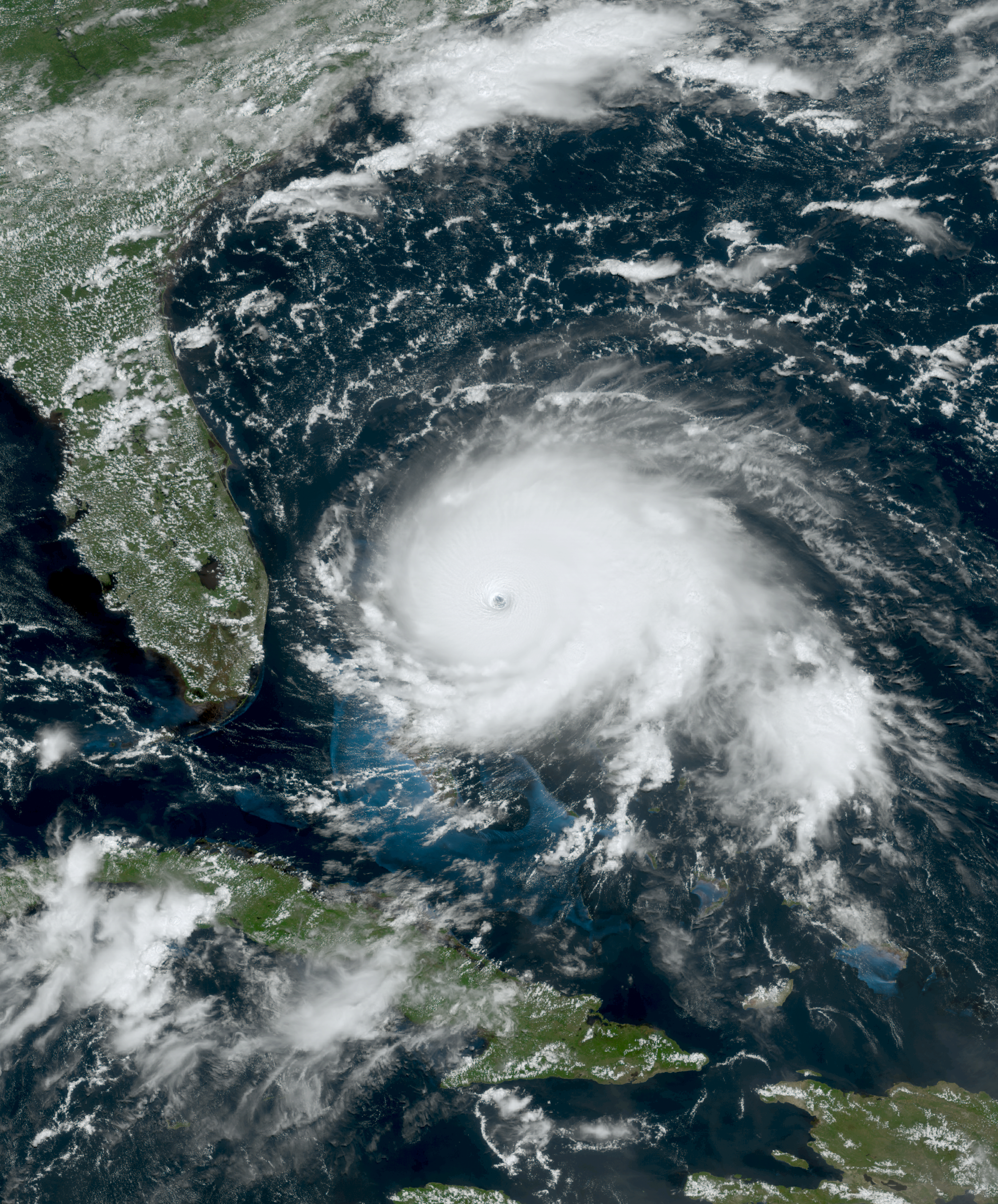
Dorian at peak intensity while making landfall in the Abaco Islands on 1 September.

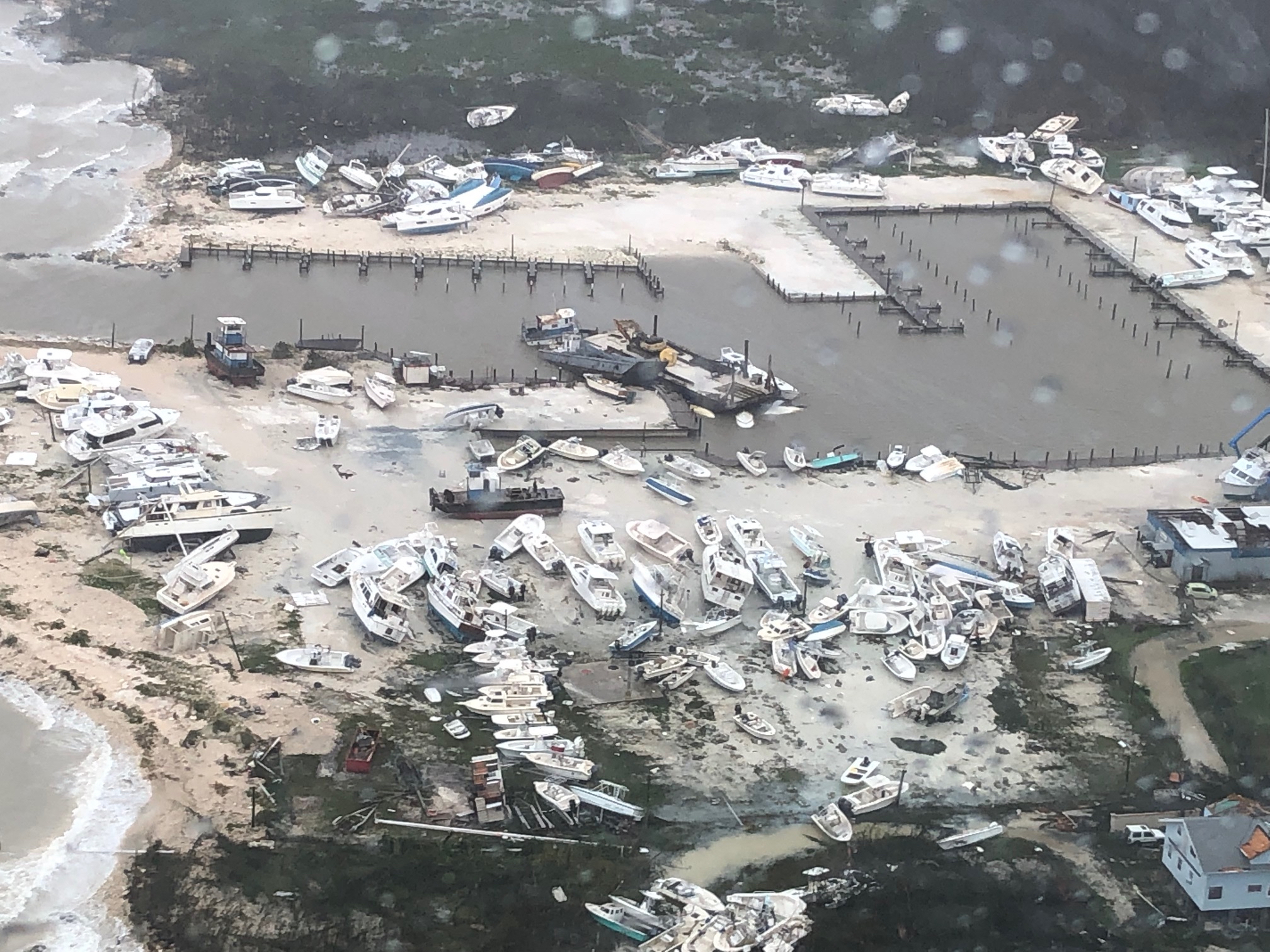
Hurricane Dorian's destruction in The Bahamas

On 1 September, the eye of Hurricane Dorian made landfall on the Abaco Islands with maximum sustained winds of 298 km/h (185 mph), making it the strongest hurricane on record to affect The Bahamas. On 2 September, the eye of Dorian moved over the eastern end of Grand Bahama Island, and drifted across the island. Bahamian Minister of Agriculture Michael Pintard reported an estimated storm tide of 6.1 to 7.6 m (20 to 25 ft) at his home on Grand Bahama. Dorian also dropped an estimated 0.91 m (3.0 ft) of rain over The Bahamas.

Hurricane Dorian killed at least 70 people in The Bahamas – 60 on Abaco and 10 on Grand Bahama. One of the fatalities was classified as indirect. Damage amounted to US$3.4 billion. Insured losses alone were confirmed to be at least US$1 billion. Across The Bahamas, the storm left at least 70,000 people homeless. An estimated 13,000 homes, constituting 45% of the homes on the Abacos and Grand Bahama, suffered severe damage or were completely destroyed.

=== Abaco Islands ===
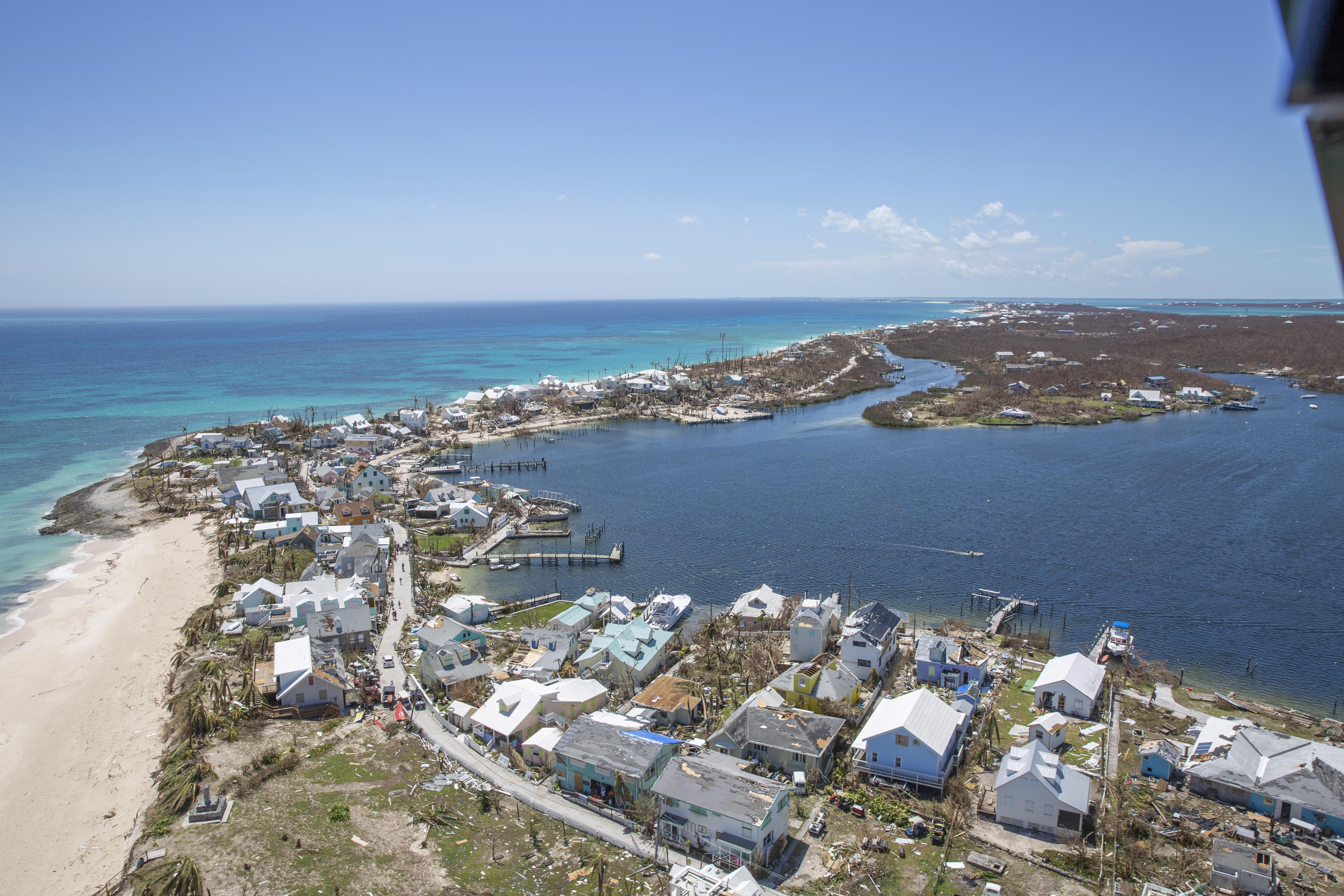
Hope Town on 5 September

Hurricane Dorian knocked out the power, water, telecommunications, and sewage service on the Abacos. For several days, Marsh Harbour Airport on Great Abaco was underwater, and the control tower was damaged by the waters. The airport was closed on 4 September. About 90% of the infrastructure in Marsh Harbour was damaged. The shantytowns of Marsh Harbour, housing mostly poor Haitian immigrants, were completely destroyed. In central and northern Abaco, Dorian severely damaged roadways, as well as thousands of houses, with 60% of homes in northern Abaco damaged or destroyed. The power grid serving the entirety of the Abacos was destroyed. The terminal building of Treasure Cay Airport suffered significant damage.

=== Grand Bahama ===
There was an island-wide power outage on Grand Bahama Island, and an oil refinery was damaged. About 300 homes on the island were destroyed or severely damaged, with the heaviest damage on the eastern side of the island. At least 60% of Grand Bahama Island was left submerged as Dorian moved away on 3 September. Grand Bahama International Airport went underwater by 07:00 UTC 2 September, with water levels reaching 1.8 m (6 ft). Strong winds at the airport severely damaged buildings and aircraft, leaving debris strewn across the airport and surrounding roads. Floodwaters and sewage contaminated Rand Memorial Hospital. The operating room, intensive care unit, and the wards were rendered unusable after being tainted by sewage, while mould outbreaks after the floodwaters receded forced more parts of the hospital to be evacuated. The two main supermarkets in Freeport, as well as their warehouses, were inundated by storm surge.

=== Elsewhere ===
At 11:24 UTC on 2 September 2019, total power was lost on the island of New Providence. The following day, by 1:50 (UTC), 40% of power had been restored.

== Aftermath ==
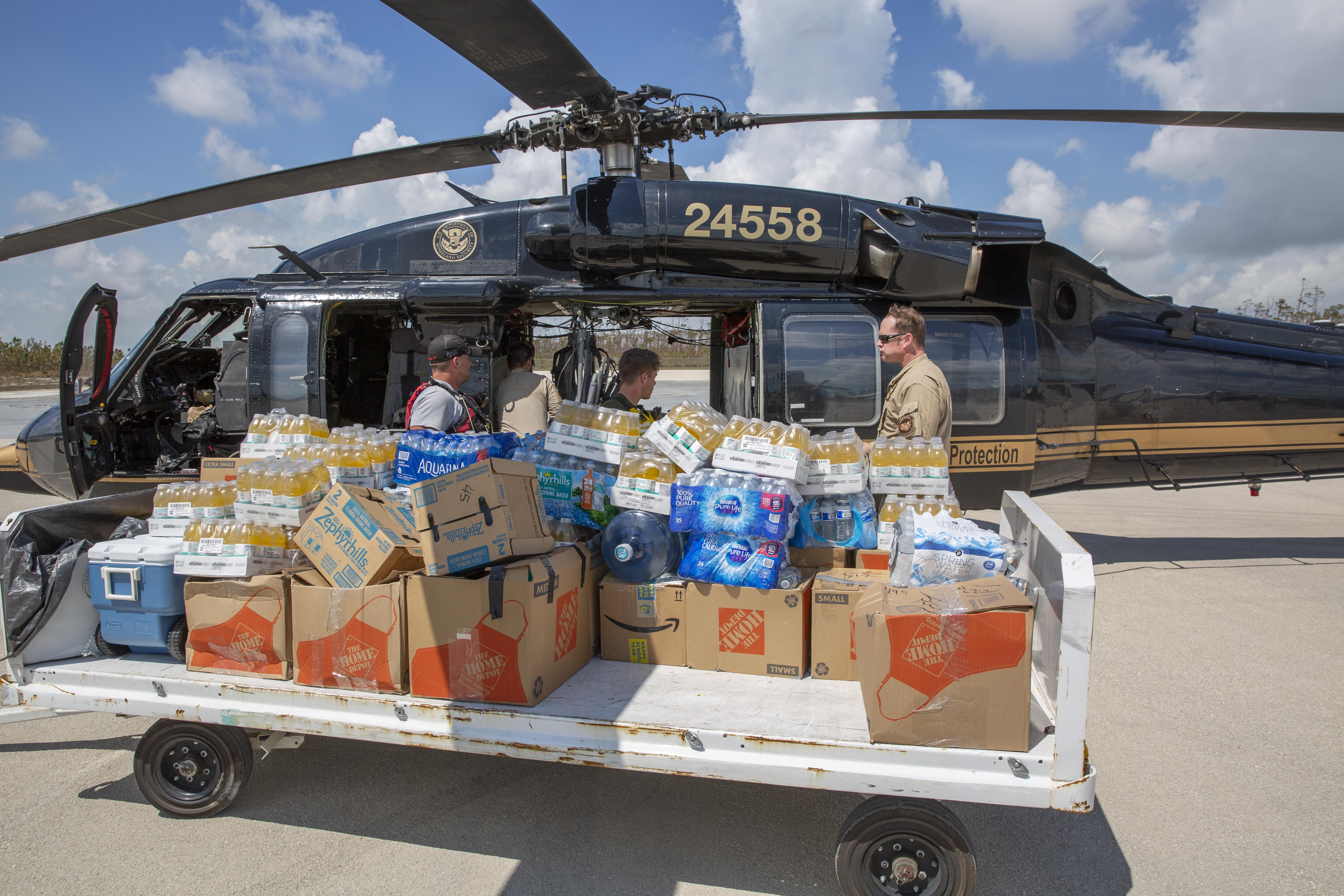
U.S. Customs and Border Protection agents deliver relief supplies to The Bahamas

The National Emergency Management Agency of The Bahamas (NEMA) handled the response to the hurricane, working with the Caribbean Disaster Emergency Management Agency. In the days after Dorian affected The Bahamas, officials surveyed the damage by air. Residents in the Abacos and Grand Bahama suffered from water shortages, power outages, and a lack of telecommunications; these conditions created difficulty in handling the logistics of the disaster. After the storm, at least 2,000 people stayed in government shelters. Thousands of people left Abaco and Grand Bahama in the days after the storm, with the Department of Rehabilitative Welfare Services in New Providence recording 6,854 evacuees entering Nassau by air from 5 to 13 September. Several cruise companies redirected their ships to bring aid and transport passengers off the affected islands. Bahamasair offered free flights out of Abaco and Grand Bahama beginning 5 September, though some passengers said they still had to pay. The Royal Bahamas Defence Force and the Royal Bahamas Police Force were deployed to Grand Bahama and Abaco via boat. Widespread looting, however, still occurred in the immediate aftermath of the hurricane.

On 5 September, the Central Emergency Response Fund of the United Nations provided US$1 million for initial emergency aid. The World Food Programme sent a team of 15 experts to coordinate emergency operations. The agency also provided power generators and 14,700 ready-to-eat meals. The Caribbean Catastrophe Risk Insurance Facility paid The Bahamas about US$10.9 million on 6 September, due to the country's insurance policy being activated. Télécoms Sans Frontières was the first non-governmental organisation (NGO) on Abaco, which worked to re-establish satellite connection. The Pan American Health Organization sent a team of doctors, nurses, and 34 tons of medical equipment for a three-month stay in the country. On 8 September, the Pan American Health Organization launched a $3.5 million appeal to cover health care related needs in the country. The International Organization for Migration provided 1,000 tarpaulins to the country. Team Rubicon Canada disaster response volunteers arrived on Grand Bahama and Great Abaco Islands on 17 Sep and joined teams from the US and UK in providing disaster response. The majority of the Team Rubicon Canada efforts were centered on clearing debris at key facilities and structures in Marsh Harbour.

The United Kingdom pledged £1.5 million to support the RFA Mounts Bay, which delivered emergency supplies and a helicopter. The government of the British Virgin Islands pledged US$100,000 to The Bahamas. The United States provided four helicopters to assist in search and rescue operations, while their Coast Guard also helped to rescue residents trapped by floodwaters. The Netherlands announced on 5 September that they would send two naval ships with supplies from nearby Sint Maarten. On 6 September, Canada sent a CC-130J Hercules aircraft to Nassau, joining the Jamaican Defence Force's Disaster Assistance Response Team. Canada also pledged C$500,000 in humanitarian aid. Meanwhile, Canadian-based charity GlobalMedic sent in volunteers carrying water purification units and emergency hygiene kits. Japan provided tents and blankets through their Japan International Cooperation Agency. India announced it would send US$1 million in aid on 8 September, while South Korea sent US$200,000 in humanitarian assistance the next day.

On 11 September, NEMA reported that 2,500 people were still missing; this figure was revised down to 1,300 the next day. Recovery efforts were hampered slightly on 13–14 September as Tropical Storm Humberto passed within 48 km (30 mi) east of the Abaco Islands, requiring the issuance of tropical storm warnings for the northwestern Bahamas. Impacts were minimal, however, as the strongest winds and rain were on the eastern flank of Humberto and thus stayed away from The Bahamas. As of 15 September, about 2,100 people remained in 20 shelters across New Providence, Grand Bahama, and Abaco.

The Ministry for Disaster Preparedness, Management, and Reconstruction in Nassau received $3.6 million-worth of modular shelters, medical evacuation boats, and construction materials from the United States embassy in Nassau. This donation was an addition to what was nearly $38 million in assistance from the United States to disaster recovery in The Bahamas since Hurricane Dorian.

== Death toll and search for survivors ==
As of 20 December 2024, the known death toll is 74, with officials indicating the true toll may be more than 600. The lead physician for northern Abaco, Latoya Munroe, stated the official death toll excludes undocumented Haitian immigrants living in the Mudd and surrounding areas and reported seeing 80–100 bodies herself. The number of missing persons fell from 1300 the third week of September to under 300 in October, when it was last updated. Police Commissioner Anthony Ferguson stated that the final toll from the hurricane will likely never be known, although when the National Hurricane Center's final report was released, estimates of between 200 and 300 were given. Fifty-five unidentified bodies were buried on 22 May after being in a refrigeration trailer since the hurricane. In a statement on 9 June 2020, former Health Minister Dr. Duane Sands raised concerns over the handling of the missing persons list. According to him, thousands of names were removed without reason after the Royal Bahamas Police Force took over.

Within a week of the hurricane's impact U.S. and Canadian urban search and rescue teams were deployed across Abaco and Grand Bahamas. Morgues in Abaco and Nassau reached capacity within a week of the hurricane, necessitating the use of refrigerated shipping containers. Bahamian officials advised rescuers to mark corpses' locations rather than collect them, which was also necessary for canine teams unable to confirm finds obscured under debris. Corpses remained buried under debris for nearly three weeks after the hurricane, with decomposition leading to reports of overwhelming miasma in many communities.

== See also ==
- Hurricane Andrew – another Category 5 hurricane that affected the country
- Hurricane Joaquin – a Category 4 hurricane that severely affected the Bahamas
- Hurricane Frances – another Category 4 hurricane that affected the entire archipelago
