= CTAA =

CTAA may refer to:

- Chinese Taipei Athletics Association, a sport organizing body in Taiwan
- Anglo-Argentine Tramways Company (Compañía de Tramways Anglo Argentina), a former transportation company in Argentina
