= Wang Ching-cheng =

Taiwanese runner

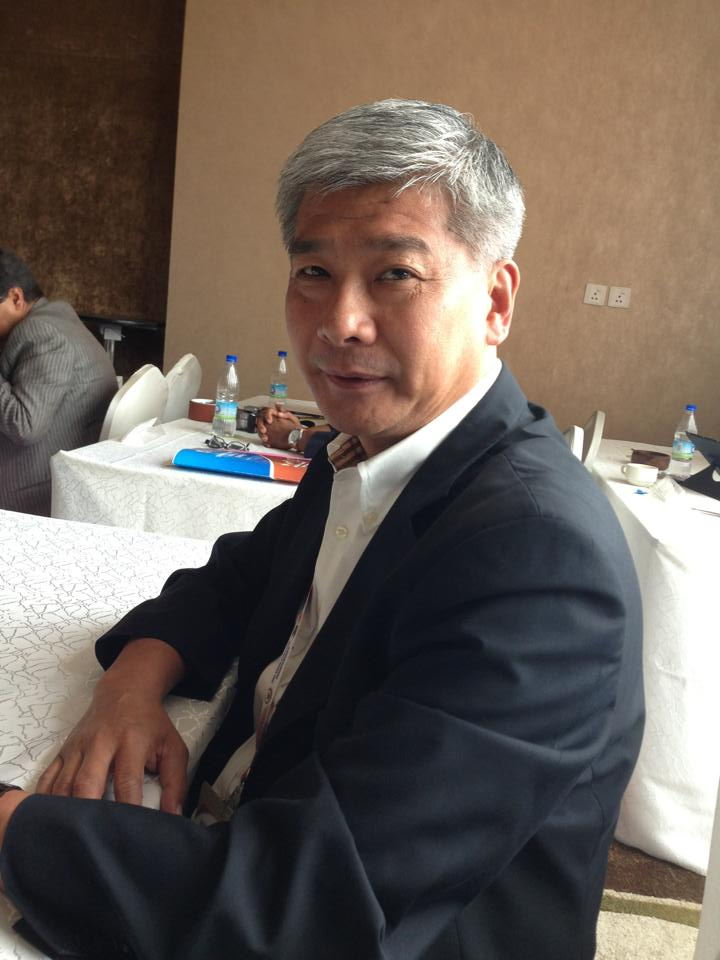
Wang Ching-cheng in 2013

Wang Ching-cheng (Chinese: 王景成; born 22 November 1958 in Kaohsiung) is a former Taiwanese 800m runner.

He held the national champion title in men's 800m six times. He is now the General Secretary of Chinese Taipei Athletics Association.

He has been active in sports in Taiwan and Asia, he is the member of Executive Board of Chinese Taipei Olympic Committee, the Individual Council member of Asian Athletics Association (2013-2023) and the Executive Secretary of Taoyuan Sports Federation in Taiwan.
