= Meteorological history of Hurricane Dorian =

Hurricane Dorian
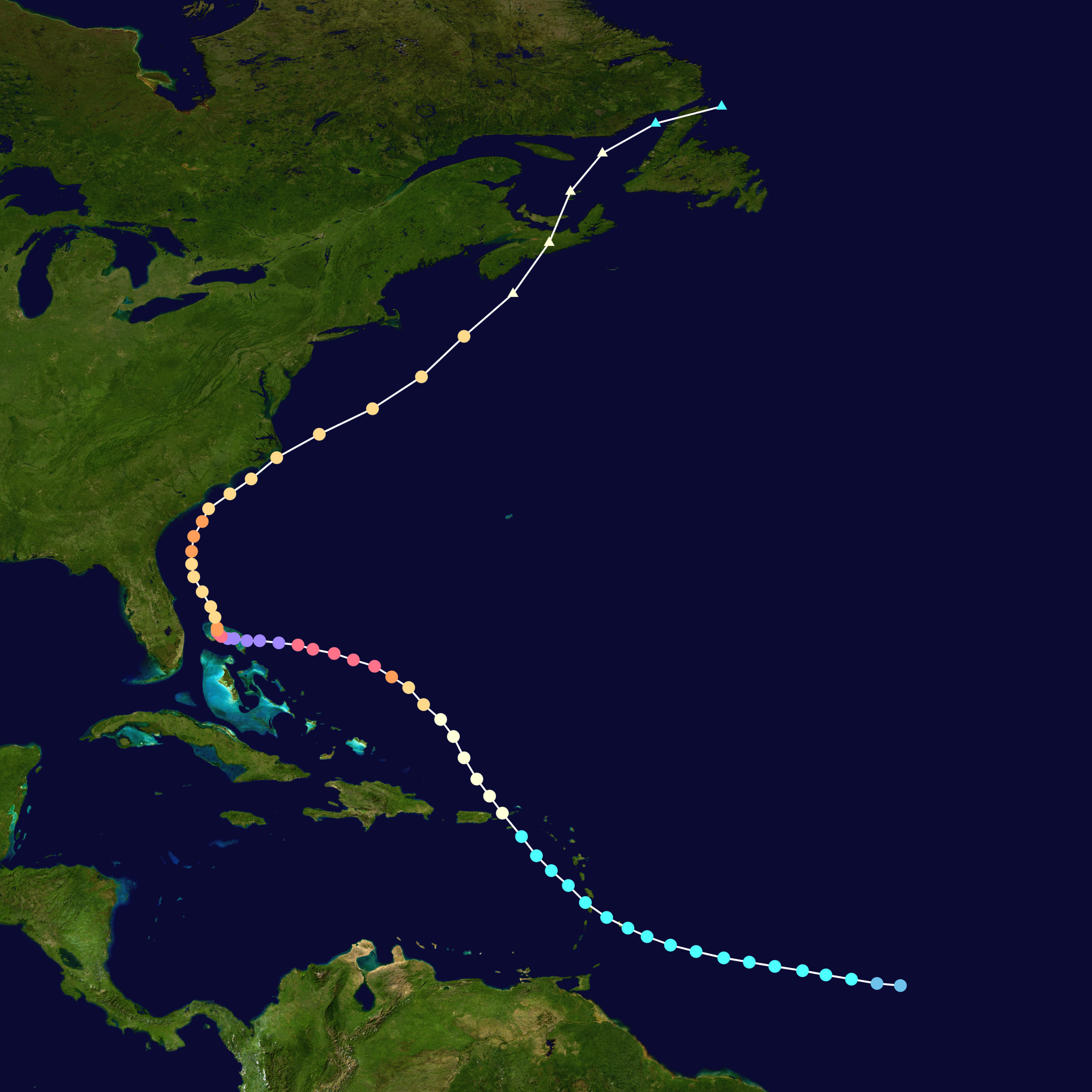
- Map plotting the storm's track and intensity, according to the Saffir–Simpson scale

Meteorological history
- Formed: August 24, 2019
- Extratropical: September 7, 2019
- Dissipated: September 9, 2019

Category 5 major hurricane
- 1-minute sustained (SSHWS/NWS)
- Highest winds: 185 mph (295 km/h)
- Lowest pressure: 910 mbar (hPa); 26.87 inHg

Overall effects
- Areas affected: Lesser Antilles, Puerto Rico, the Bahamas (particularly the Abaco Islands and Grand Bahama), Eastern United States, Eastern Canada
- Part of the 2019 Atlantic hurricane season
- History: Meteorological history; Effects: The Caribbean; The Bahamas; The Carolinas; Atlantic Canada; Alabama controversy; Other wikis: Commons: Dorian images

Hurricane Dorian was the strongest hurricane to affect The Bahamas on record, causing catastrophic damage on the islands of Abaco Islands and Grand Bahama, in early September 2019. The cyclone's intensity, as well as its slow forward motion near The Bahamas, broke numerous records. The fifth tropical cyclone, fourth named storm, second hurricane, and first major hurricane of the 2019 Atlantic hurricane season, (Note: A major hurricane is one that ranks at Category 3 or higher on the Saffir–Simpson scale.) Dorian originated from a westward-traveling tropical wave, that departed from the western coast of Africa on August 19. The system organized into a tropical depression and later a tropical storm, both on August 24.

The newly formed Dorian strengthened only gradually over the next few days because of dry air and vertical wind shear. On August 27, Dorian made landfall in Barbados and St. Lucia before entering the Caribbean. Dorian's structure was seriously disrupted after encountering the mountains of St. Lucia, causing the system's center to reform north of its previous location. Moving farther north and east than anticipated, Dorian passed east of Puerto Rico on August 28. Simultaneously, relaxing wind shear and warm sea surface temperatures allowed Dorian to become a Category 1 hurricane as it moved over the United States Virgin Islands. Intensification temporarily stagnated on August 29 before a spurt of rapid deepening began on August 30. During this time, the hurricane turned west-northwestward, then westward, as a ridge built in the subtropics to the north. Dorian achieved Category 5 intensity – the highest classification on the Saffir–Simpson scale – on September 1. The system reached peak intensity later that day, with winds of 185 mph (295 km/h) and a central pressure of 910 mbar (hPa; 26.87 inHg) while making landfall on Elbow Cay in The Bahamas. (Note: The figures for maximum sustained winds and position estimates are rounded to the nearest 5 units (knots, miles, or kilometers), following the convention used in the National Hurricane Center's products. Direct wind observations are rounded to the nearest whole number. All winds are one-minute sustained, unless otherwise noted. Atmospheric pressures are listed to the nearest millibar and nearest hundredth of an inch of mercury.)

Dorian weakened steadily throughout September 2; the storm's forward momentum came to a crawl while it was crossing over Grand Bahama. The system fell below major hurricane status on September 3, as it began to accelerate northwards. On September 5, Dorian briefly reintensified into a Category 3 hurricane, as it traversed the warm waters of the Gulf Stream. Increasing wind shear weakened Dorian once again, as it turned northeast and approached the Outer Banks. On September 6, Dorian made landfall on Cape Hatteras as a low-end Category 2 hurricane. As Dorian became increasingly influenced by the westerlies, it transitioned into a post-tropical cyclone on September 7 just before passing over Nova Scotia. It then became fully extratropical the next day over the Gulf of Saint Lawrence and was absorbed by a larger extratropical cyclone on September 9.

== Origins and track through the Lesser Antilles ==
Hurricane Dorian originated from a large tropical wave – an elongated trough of low air pressure – that departed from the western coast of Africa on August 19, 2019. Around that time, much of the wave's convection or thunderstorm activity was located inland near Guinea and Senegal rather than close to its center. Thunderstorms in the northern portion of the wave were limited by an abundance of Saharan dust in the region. While the wave traveled westward across the low latitudes of the Atlantic, it lost most of its convection before a low-pressure area developed on August 22. Despite being located in an area of moderate vertical wind shear, the system continued to increase in organization. The National Hurricane Center (NHC), initially predicted slow development on August 23 as the system continued westward. However, the system organized into a tropical depression at 06:00 UTC on August 24, while approximately 805 mi (1,295 km) east-southeast of the island of Barbados.

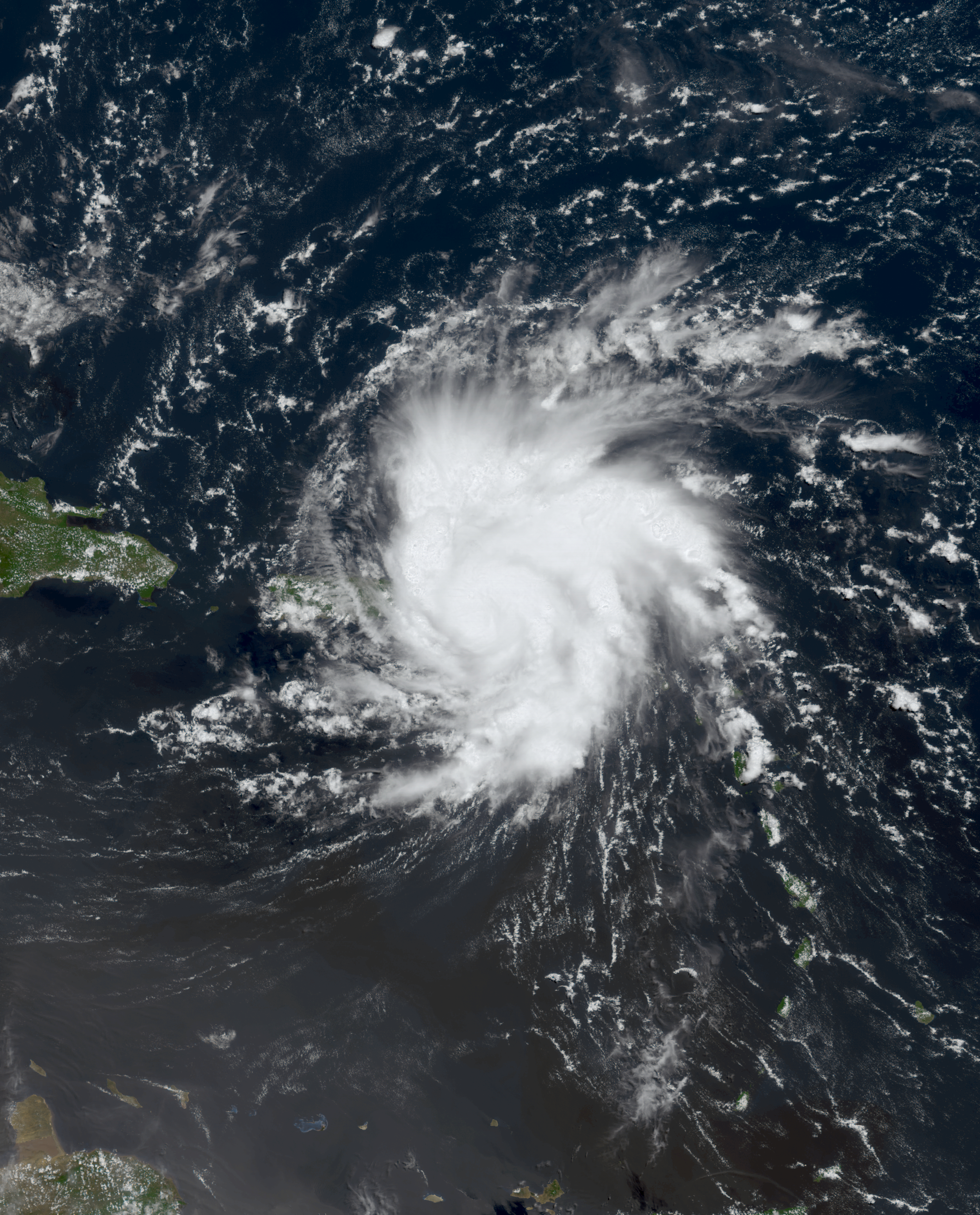
Hurricane Dorian passing by Puerto Rico and over the Virgin Islands on August 28

Early in the depression's existence, its southeastern outflow was restricted due to moderate easterly wind shear. The system was upgraded into Tropical Storm Dorian at 18:00 UTC after developing a 10-mile (15 km) wide eye-like feature at its mid-levels and banding features that wrapped around it. Dorian initially intensified while it was located in an environment of warm sea surface temperatures. This trend all but ceased over the next few days as a result of wind shear, as well as abundant mid-level dry air. With little change in intensity, Dorian made landfall over Barbados around 01:30 UTC on August 27 with maximum sustained winds of 50 mph (85 km/h), entering the Caribbean. At that time, composite radar showed that the system lacked a strong inner core. The tropical storm made its second landfall on St. Lucia around 11:00 UTC at the same intensity; the mountainous terrain of the island disrupted the low-level circulation of the system. Soon after, Dorian's center re-developed farther north. Meanwhile, the storm's convection fluctuated as the system continued to be affected by dry air and interacted with the Leeward and Windward islands. Dorian briefly developed a 10-mile (15 km) wide eye on radar on a couple occasions, but it quickly eroded because of mid-level dry air incursions.

Dorian soon took a more northwesterly direction as a result of a weakness in a ridge, caused by a mid- to upper-level low (cold-core cyclone) located to the north of the island of Hispaniola. Although Dorian was initially forecast to make landfall on Hispaniola and subsequently weaken or dissipate over the island, the system's track shifted east of Puerto Rico by August 28 as a result of northerly directional change, as well as the center reformation. Dorian's structure began to improve on the same day, with banding features becoming more prominent and a partial eyewall forming. As Dorian strengthened into a Category 1 hurricane on the Saffir–Simpson scale, it made landfall over St. Croix and St. Thomas in the United States Virgin Islands at 15:30 UTC and 18:00 UTC, respectively. Meanwhile, the cloud pattern of the tropical cyclone was continuing to increase in organization, with an eye becoming apparent on satellite imagery. The hurricane progressed northwestward under the influence of flow between an upper-level low over the Straits of Florida and the Atlantic subtropical ridge. Additional strengthening was forecast as the storm would remain in a favorable environment with an increasingly moist mid-level, with sea temperatures near or over 84 °F (29 °C), and low wind shear. Even though the storm had strengthened and developed a more defined eye, dry air and southwesterly wind shear caused Dorian's intensification to temporarily stagnate before decreasing again. Later, on August 29, a NOAA Hurricane Hunter aircraft reported the presence of concentric eyewalls, indicating that an eyewall replacement cycle had commenced. The aircraft also discovered that the central pressure had fallen. The plane did not find any stronger winds as Dorian continued to track towards the northwest.

== Rapid intensification and landfalls in the Bahamas ==
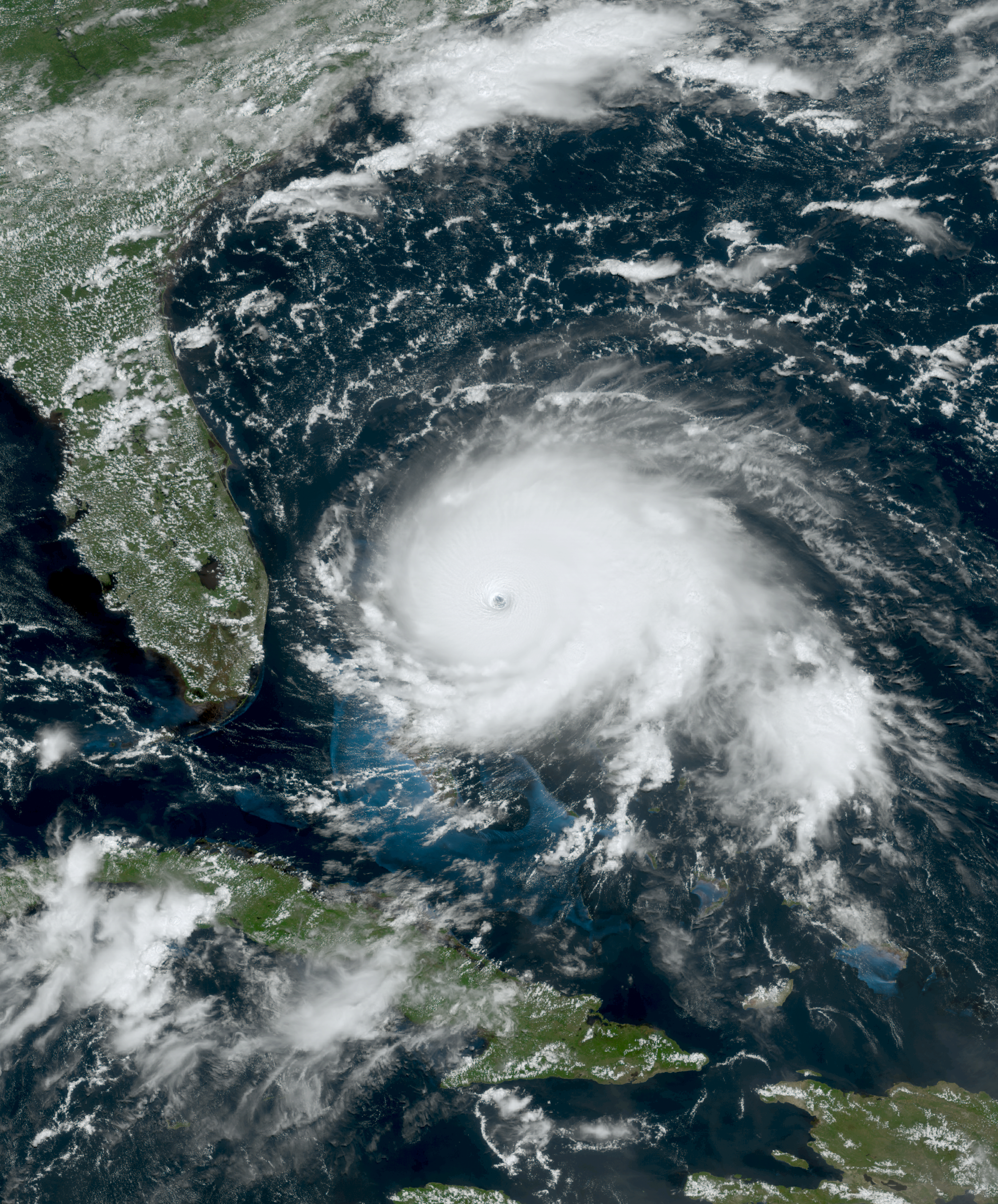
Hurricane Dorian at peak intensity while making landfall in the Abaco Islands on September 1

By the morning of August 30, Dorian completed the eyewall replacement cycle and resumed its intensification trend. The upper-level low steering the hurricane retreated to the south, while the Atlantic subtropical ridge built westward. This caused Dorian to track west-northwest into a highly favorable environment characterized by low wind shear, high relative humidity, and sea surface temperatures of 84 °F (29 °C). The storm then moved west, straight towards the northwestern Bahamas. Dorian reached major hurricane intensity at 18:00 UTC on August 30 about 445 mi (715 km) east of the northwestern Bahamas. Later that evening, the eye of Dorian cleared out and became surrounded by a ring of deep convection. Meanwhile, a burst of lightning activity occurred in the northwest eyewall, heralding further intensification. A Hurricane Hunter aircraft revealed that Dorian rapidly intensified to Category 4 status at 00:00 UTC on August 31, with surface winds measured to be near 130 mph (215 km/h). The satellite presentation of Dorian continued to improve, with the eye increasing in definition and stabilizing at a diameter of about 14 miles (23 km). The eye also began to demonstrate a pronounced stadium effect, where the clouds of the eyewall curved outward from the surface with height; this is a feature at times seen in intense tropical cyclones.

At 06:00 UTC on September 1, Dorian became a Category 5 hurricane with winds of 165 mph (270 km/h). Around 12:00 UTC, the NHC estimated the one-minute sustained winds to have reached 180 mph (285 km/h), making Dorian the strongest hurricane to impact The Bahamas on record. Just before 15:00 UTC, a Hurricane Hunter aircraft in Dorian's eyewall measured flight-level winds of 183 mph (294 km/h) and its stepped frequency microwave radiometer recorded winds of up to 196 mph (315 km/h), while a dropsonde released by the aircraft recorded a surface wind gust of 203 mph (326 km/h). Further deepening occurred over the next couple of hours, with maximum sustained winds reaching 185 mph (295 km/h) and the minimum central pressure dropping to 910 mbar (hPa; 26.87 inHg), representing Dorian's peak intensity. At this strength, Dorian made landfall over Elbow Cay of the Abaco Islands at 16:40 UTC September 1, becoming the strongest hurricane to make landfall in The Bahamas in modern records.

As Dorian crossed the Abaco Islands, a ridge to the north of the hurricane weakened. The steering flow hence diminished, causing Dorian to decelerate. Creeping slowly westwards, Dorian weakened slightly before making landfall near South Riding Point, Grand Bahama with winds of 180 mph (285 km/h) at 02:15 UTC on September 2. The system moved off the north coast of Grand Bahama six hours later, still as a Category 5 hurricane, albeit with a larger eye and lower winds because of land interaction and an upwelling of cooler waters beneath the system. These factors, coupled with Dorian's slow motion, caused steady weakening over the next couple of days, with Dorian dropping to Category 3 status at 06:00 UTC September 3. Through this time, Dorian essentially stalled just north of Grand Bahama – from 12:00 UTC September 2 to 12:00 UTC September 3, Dorian traveled a distance of just 30 miles (48 km). As a result, the entire island of Grand Bahama experienced winds of at least tropical-storm-force for three consecutive days. Parts of Grand Bahama experienced the eyewall for more than 25 hours, including 5 hours while Dorian was at Category 5 intensity; meanwhile Halls Point spent over 11 hours within Dorian's eye. During this period, Dorian brought an estimated 3.0 ft (0.9 m) of rain to The Bahamas, along with a storm surge of over 20 ft (6.1 m).

== Northward turn, extratropical transition, and dissipation ==
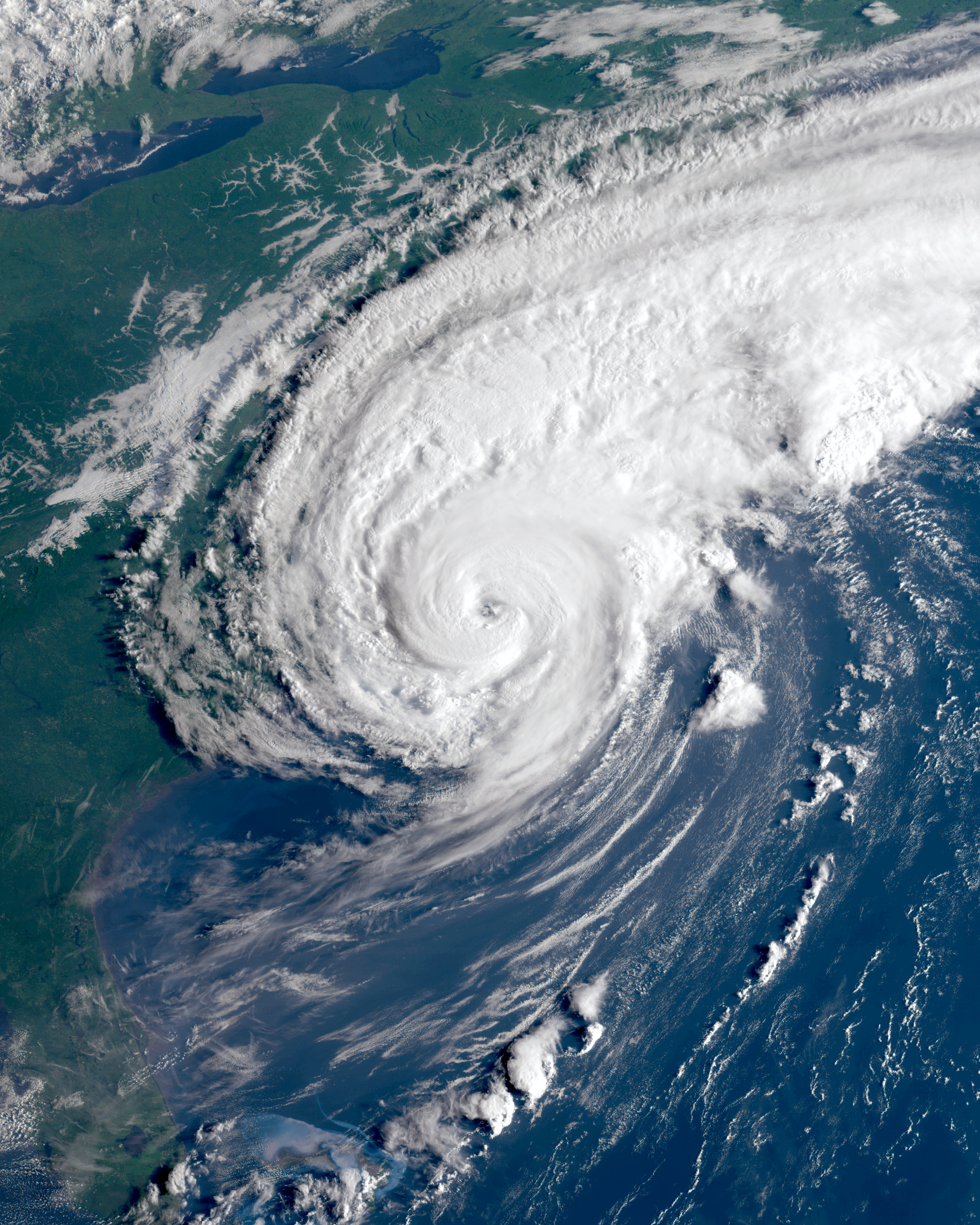
Hurricane Dorian making landfall in Hatteras, North Carolina as a Category 2 hurricane, with maximum wind speeds of 100 mph (155 km/h)

Dorian began a northwestward motion late on September 3 towards the eastern coast of the United States, as an eastward-moving mid-level trough over the Eastern United States pulled Dorian to the north. At the same time, the eye had become cloud-filled, larger, and more ragged. Data collected by reconnaissance aircraft and buoys indicated that the wind field of the storm was expanding. Dorian slowly weakened over the next day after entering an area of cooler sea surface temperatures and high wind shear. The distinctness of the storm's eye waxed and waned as the system continued to pick up forward speed. Soon after, clouds in the eyewall began to cool as Dorian began to restrengthen, facilitated by the warm waters of the Gulf Stream. After the eye cleared and became surrounded by deep convection, the hurricane reached its secondary peak intensity as a 115-mile-per-hour (185 km/h) Category 3 hurricane at 00:00 UTC on September 5, while located off the coast of Georgia. After about 12 hours, Dorian began to gradually weaken as it traveled along the South Carolina coast. Rapidly accelerating northeastward, Dorian made landfall over Cape Hatteras, North Carolina, as a Category 2 hurricane, at approximately 12:30 UTC on September 6, with 100 mph (155 km/h) winds and a pressure of 957 mbar (28.26 inHg); North Carolina mainly experienced Category 1 winds as the peak winds occurred primarily offshore. Despite being significantly weaker, the storm still possessed a well-defined eye surrounded by deep convection.

Early on September 7, Dorian began to undergo the transition to an extratropical cyclone. The eye completely disappeared from satellite imagery as the storm began to take on a more asymmetric structure. The hurricane's structure degraded due to strong southwesterly shear, with most of its convection displaced to the north and east of the center. Soon after, cold air clouds began to entrain on Dorian's southwestern side, as the storm connected with a warm front that was developing to the northeast. Dorian became a post-tropical cyclone around 18:00 UTC on September 7 after losing much of its tropical characteristics. Despite this, the NHC opted to continue issuing advisories on the system, due to the threat it posed to Atlantic Canada. At the time, an ASCAT pass showed a region of 90–100 mph (150–155 km/h) winds in the storm. Dorian made landfall near Sambro Creek in Nova Scotia, Canada, at approximately 22:00 UTC. The storm gradually turned towards the east as it became embedded within the extratropical westerly flow. The storm was deemed to have fully completed its extratropical transition over the Gulf of Saint Lawrence by 06:00 UTC on September 8. Dorian's cloud pattern gradually decayed, with the storm weakening to tropical storm-force by 18:00 UTC. By September 9, virtually no significant convection existed near the center of Dorian. Soon after, the cyclone passed the Strait of Belle Isle and entered the northern Atlantic; sea surface temperatures were less than 50 °F (10 °C) in the nearby Labrador Sea. Dorian was ultimately absorbed by a larger extratropical cyclone at 06:00 UTC on September 9, while located northeast of Newfoundland.

== Records ==
Most intense landfalling Atlantic hurricanes Intensity is measured solely by central pressure
Rank	Hurricane (Note: Storms with designations in quotation marks are officially unnamed. Tropical storms and hurricanes were not named before the year 1950.)	Season	Landfall pressure
1	"Labor Day"	1935	892 mbar (hPa)
2	Melissa	2025	897 mbar (hPa)
3	Camille	1969	900 mbar (hPa)
3	Gilbert	1988	900 mbar (hPa)
5	Dean	2007	905 mbar (hPa)
6	"Cuba"	1924	910 mbar (hPa)
6	Dorian	2019	910 mbar (hPa)
8	Janet	1955	914 mbar (hPa)
8	Irma	2017	914 mbar (hPa)
10	"Cuba"	1932	918 mbar (hPa)
Sources: HURDAT, AOML/HRD, NHC

Dorian broke numerous intensity records after it reached its peak intensity. Dorian is tied with the 1935 Labor Day hurricane, Gilbert and Wilma for the second-highest wind speed of an Atlantic hurricane at 185 mph (295 km/h), just below Allen's and Melissa's record wind speed of 190 mph (305 km/h). This intensity made Dorian the strongest hurricane outside of the tropics. The cyclone's 185 mph (295 km/h) landfall on Abaco Island was the strongest on record for The Bahamas. Dorian was the second Category 5 hurricane to make landfall on the Abaco Islands on record, the other having occurred in 1932. Additionally, Dorian is tied with the 1935 Labor Day hurricane for the highest sustained winds at landfall in an Atlantic hurricane. With Dorian, 2019 became the fourth consecutive year to produce at least one Category 5 hurricane. (Note: The four-year period of 2016–2019 broke the record for most consecutive years yielding at least one Category 5 storm.)

Dorian's slow forward motion near The Bahamas also set several records. During one 24-hour period, Dorian moved slower than any other major hurricane since Hurricane Betsy in 1965. The storm also impacted a single land area as a Category 5 hurricane for the longest duration recorded in the Atlantic basin, with portions of Dorian's eyewall striking Great Abaco Island and Grand Bahama for about 22 hours.

== See also ==
- Tropical cyclones in 2019
- List of Category 5 Atlantic hurricanes
- 1932 Bahamas hurricane – A Category 5 hurricane that caused damage throughout The Bahamas
- Hurricane Joaquin (2015) – Another slow-moving hurricane that devastated The Bahamas at Category 4 strength
- Hurricane Matthew (2016) – A hurricane that made landfall on Grand Bahama at Category 4 status, causing extensive damage
