= Effects of Hurricane Dorian on Atlantic Canada =

Hurricane Dorian
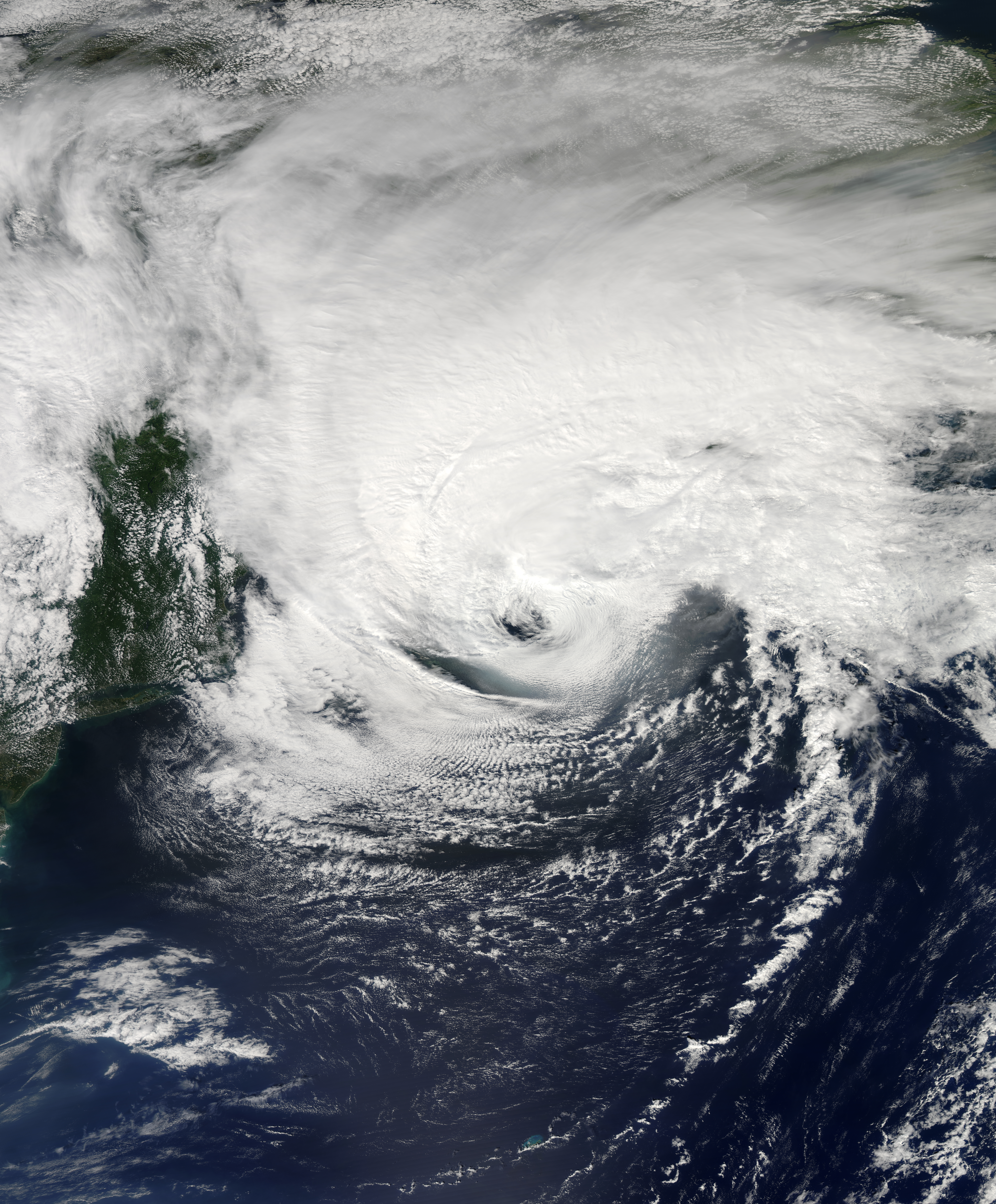
- Hurricane Dorian making landfall in Nova Scotia on September 7

Meteorological history
- Duration: September 7–9, 2019

Category 1 hurricane
- 1-minute sustained (SSHWS/NWS)
- Highest winds: 90 mph (150 km/h)
- Highest gusts: 110 mph (175 km/h)
- Lowest pressure: 954 mbar (hPa); 28.17 inHg

Overall effects
- Fatalities: None
- Damage: $115 million (2019 USD)
- Areas affected: Nova Scotia, New Brunswick, Prince Edward Island, Newfoundland and Labrador, and Quebec
- Part of the 2019 Atlantic hurricane season
- History: Meteorological history; Effects: The Caribbean; The Bahamas; The Carolinas; Atlantic Canada; Alabama controversy; Other wikis: Commons: Dorian images

Hurricane Dorian made landfall near Sambro Creek in Nova Scotia, Canada, at approximately 22:00 UTC. The storm gradually turned towards the east as it became embedded within the extratropical westerly flow. The storm was deemed to have fully completed its extratropical transition over the Gulf of Saint Lawrence by 06:00 UTC on September 8. Dorian's cloud pattern gradually decayed, with the storm weakening to tropical storm-force by 18:00 UTC.By September 9, virtually no significant convection existed near the center of Dorian. Soon after, the cyclone passed the Strait of Belle Isle and entered the northern Atlantic; sea surface temperatures were less than 50 °F (10 °C) in the nearby Labrador Sea.

== Preparations ==
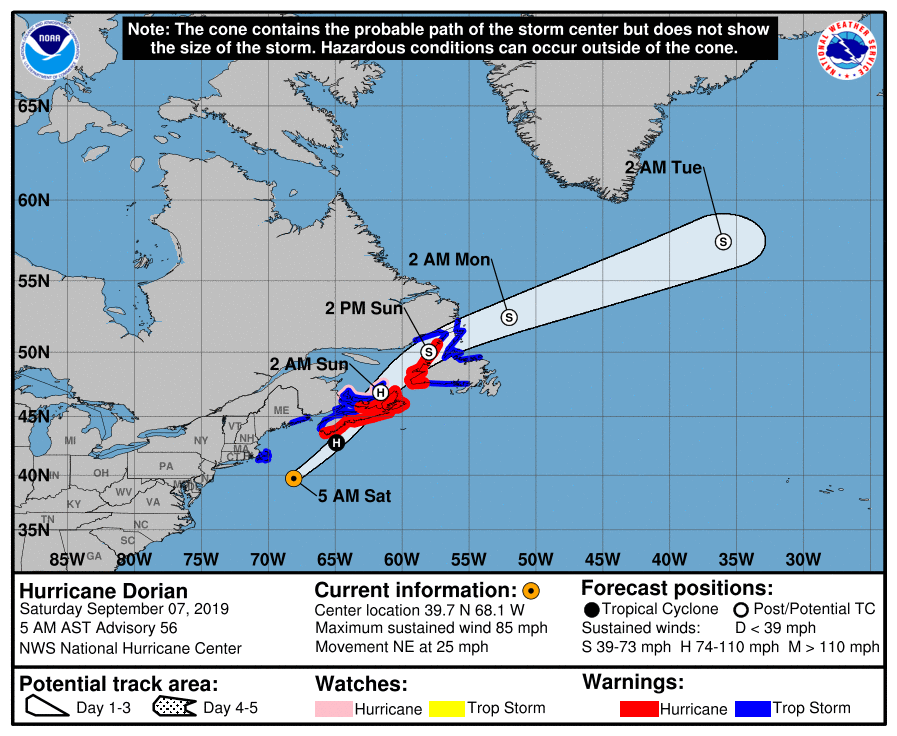
Hurricane and tropical storm warnings associated with Dorian reached their greatest extent on September 7, covering the entirety of Nova Scotia, the Magdalen Islands, Prince Edward Island, much of Newfoundland, and a small coastal area along the Quebec/Labrador border.

On September 3, with Hurricane Dorian near the Southeastern United States, the Canadian Hurricane Center (CHC) advised residents of possible impacts from the storm as it was forecast to impact the Canadian Maritimes. At the time, forecasters were uncertain of the exact track though they noted impacts would be likely in Nova Scotia and could extend as far north as New Brunswick. Emergency officials in the Halifax Regional Municipality began preparations on September 4, activating operation centres and stockpiling supplies. Officials focused on potential large-scale power outages and travel disruptions from downed trees.

Multiple cruise ships had their itineraries disrupted, with cancellations beginning on September 4. The AIDAluna was called to port in St. John's, Newfoundland, while the MS Marco Polo and Silver Wind were diverted to other ports.

On September 5, numerous events were cancelled and Nova Scotia Power activates emergency operations center, Construction Association of Nova Scotia warns to secure sites, Halifax Water preps, ExxonMobil evacuates all personnel from an oil platform near Sable Island NSP enacted extensive precautions "to an unprecedented level", as described by the utility itself. In addition, cruise ships were diverted.

Early on September 5, the CHC began issuing tropical cyclone warnings and watches for coastal provinces, initially focusing on Nova Scotia and Newfoundland. At the greatest extent hurricane warnings were covered most of Nova Scotia and western Newfoundland. Tropical storm warnings encompassed the remainder of Nova Scotia, central Newfoundland, the Magdalen Islands, Prince Edward Island, and the easternmost border of Quebec and Labrador. Advisories gradually ceased by September 8 as the post-tropical remnants of Dorian crossed the Canadian Maritimes and exited over the Atlantic Ocean. Environment Canada issued storm surge warnings for large parts of the Gulf of Saint Lawrence.

On September 6, boats returned to port across Nova Scotia, 90% moved to the west side of Cape Sable Island, with NATO warships visiting Halifax relocated. A self evacuation was issued for coastal areas, and three shelters opened (Dartmouth, Clayton Park, St. Margaret's Bay), with public transit suspended in Halifax Regional Municipality.

On September 7, Saint John's emergency management office went to its highest warning level, activating all resources. New Brunswick Power dispatched 69 technicians, 20 tree trimming crews, and 52 contractors for power restoration. Most flights to and from Greater Moncton Roméo LeBlanc International Airport, Fredericton International Airport, and Saint John Airport were cancelled. The Atlantic Balloon Fiesta in Sussex was rescheduled for September 8. Confederation Bridge was shut down at 8:15 p.m. local time.

Dundas Power Lines, originally deployed to Florida to assist with potential power outages from Dorian there, was redirected back to Nova Scotia to assist in power restoration in New Waterford.

== Impact ==
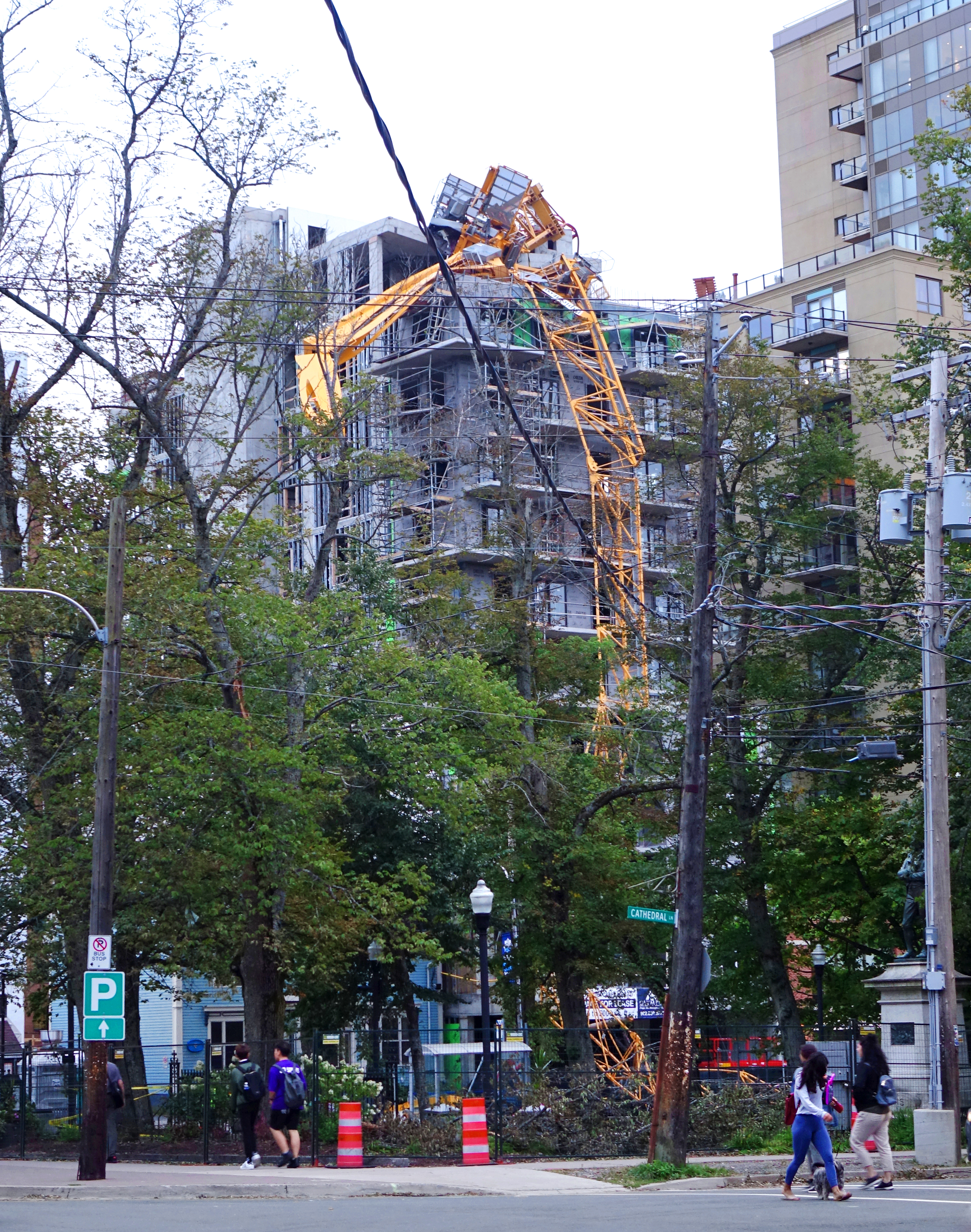
High winds toppled a crane in Halifax, Nova Scotia

The strongest winds associated with Dorian occurred in areas east of the centre while the greatest precipitation fell on the western side. All provinces in Atlantic Canada and Quebec saw tropical storm-force wind gusts, with hurricane-force gusts occurring in Nova Scotia, Prince Edward Island, and Newfoundland. The strongest winds associated with Dorian were relegated offshore and along immediate coastal areas. The highest land-based observation was 157 km/h (98 mph) in Wreckhouse, Newfoundland. Winds in this area were likely enhanced by the local topography. Rainfall exceeding 100 mm (4 in) fell in areas just west of Dorian's center in Nova Scotia and New Brunswick, peaking at 138 mm (5.43 in) in both Oxford and Lower Sackville, Nova Scotia. To the east, little precipitation fell in Newfoundland with observations hardly reaching 20 mm (0.79 in). Wet snow was reported at higher elevations in Labrador. Coastal areas across Nova Scotia and all provinces surrounding the Gulf of Saint Lawrence saw significant storm tides, storm surges, and water inundation, with the highest values occurring in New Brunswick and Prince Edward Island. Tignish, Prince Edward Island, saw the largest storm-tide associated with the cyclone at 5.23 m (17.16 ft), leading to a storm surge of 2 ft (0.61 m). Shediac, New Brunswick, saw the greatest inundation at 1.5 m (4.9 ft). Escuminac, New Brunswick, saw an inundation of 0.88 m (2.9 ft), its highest inundation on record. Along the southern coast of Nova Scotia, Halifax observed a record inundation of 0.81 m (2.66 ft). Other provincial peak storm surges include 1.51 m (4.95 ft) in Charlottetown, Prince Edward Island, 1.26 m (4.13 ft) in Channel-Port aux Basques, Newfoundland, and 1.26 m (4.13 ft) in the Magdalen Islands of Quebec.

Throughout eastern Canada, the remnants of Dorian wrought an estimated C$105 million (US$78.9 million) in insured damage: C$62.2 million (US$46.7 million) in Nova Scotia, C$22.5 million (US$16.9 million) in New Brunswick, C$17.5 million (US$13.1 million) in Prince Edward Island, C$2.5 million (US$1.9 million) in Newfoundland and Labrador, and C$300,000 (US$225,000) in Quebec. Seventy percent of claims were from private property, twenty percent from commercial, and the remainder from vehicles. Furthermore, uninsured losses exceeded C$11 million (US$8.5 million) in Nova Scotia. Altogether, damage from the cyclone exceeded C$154.9 million (US$115.1 million). This made Dorian the fifth-costliest disaster for Canada in 2019. No fatalities were reported nationwide.

=== Nova Scotia ===
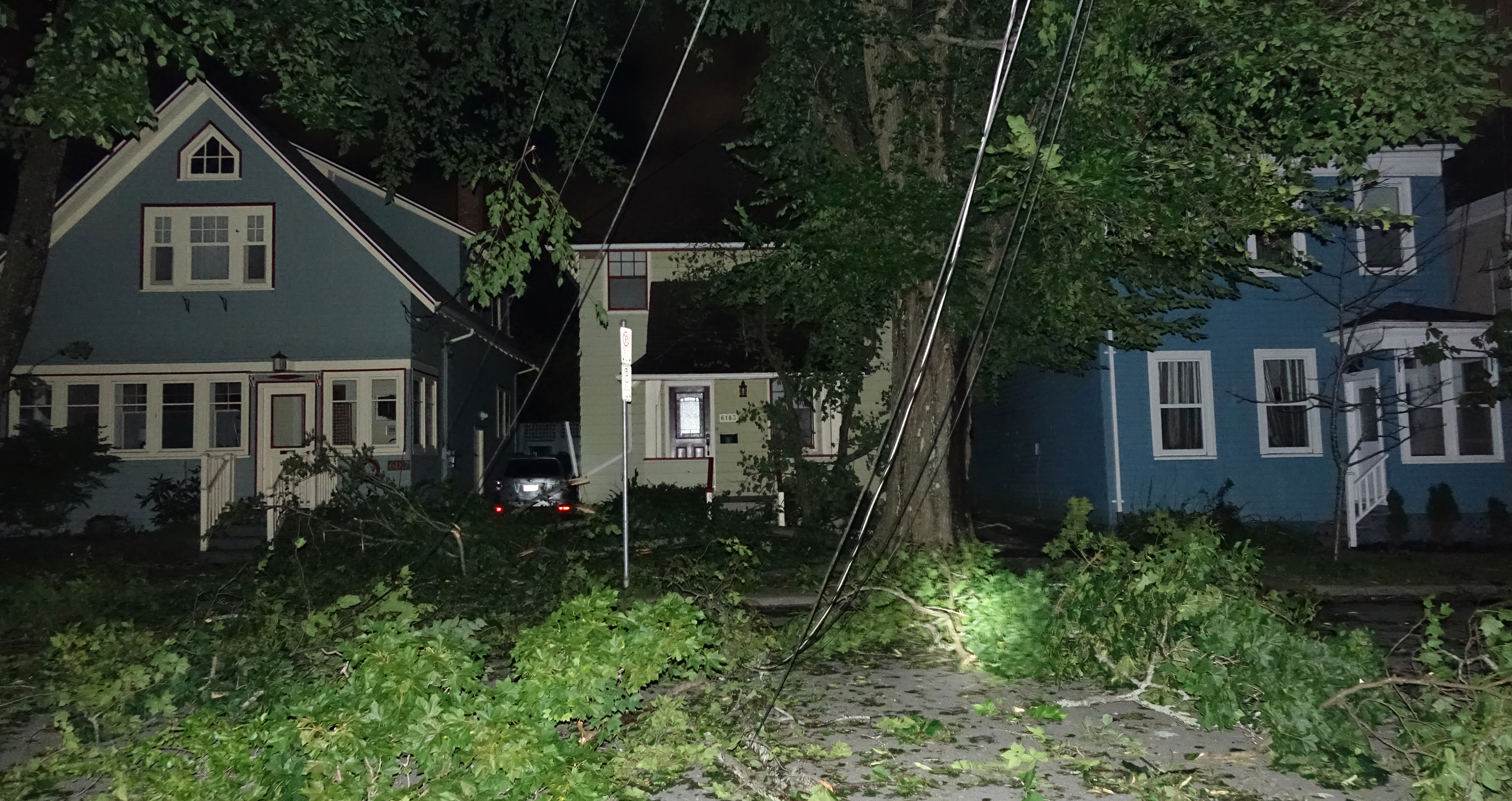
Downed trees and power lines littered streets in the wake of Hurricane Dorian

Approximately 412,000 customers—80 percent of customers—lost power across Nova Scotia, representing the largest power outage in the province's history. The breadth of outages was attributed to the prolonged duration of strong winds across the entire province. Fifty-eight substations and twenty-seven transmission lines saw total loss of electricity. Damage to Nova Scotia Power's electrical infrastructure reached C$38.9 million (US$27.7 million), the costliest on record for the company. This was 100,000 more customers than during Hurricane Juan in 2003 at three-times the cost. A tree trimming program enacted after Hurricane Arthur in 2014 somewhat mitigated the extent of outages.

In Liverpool, the Mersey River rose an estimated 300 ft (91 m) inland, causing significant damage to coastal infrastructure.

Damage across Cape Breton Island primarily came from strong winds. Several large trees fell onto homes in New Waterford while another downed tree caused the temporary closure of the Sydney-Glace Bay Highway along Highway 125.

Nova Scotia's agriculture suffered extensive losses, especially to the corn crop, with losses exceeding C$10 million. The entirety of the corn crop in Cape Breton was destroyed.

Uninsured damage across the province exceeded C$11 million (US$8.5 million) as of December 19, 2019.

=== Prince Edward Island ===
Premier Dennis King called Dorian an "unprecedented situation", with province-wide impacts. The storm was analyzed to have been more severe than Hurricane Juan for much of the island. In Summerside, 90 mm (3.5 in) of rain fell and a wind gust of 115 km/h (71 mph) was recorded.

=== New Brunswick ===
An estimated 42,200 customers lost power across New Brunswick, primarily in southeastern areas of the province.

Downed trees and property damage were reported at 55 locations in Saint John. Several trees, some estimated to be hundreds of years old, were toppled in King's Square. Flooding and debris prompted the closure of many roads across the city. Several fires were sparked by downed power lines and damaged transformers.

One person was nearly crushed by a tree when it fell on his car in Dieppe; it fell on the passenger side and he was unharmed.

Two beaches along the Northumberland Strait, Murray Beach Provincial Park and Parlee Beach Provincial Park, sustained "devastating" damage. In the former, more than 150 trees were knocked down while the latter saw 1.5 m (5 ft) of coastal erosion. Waist-deep seawater inundated parts of Pointe-du-Chêne.

=== Newfoundland and Labrador ===
Damaging winds impacted much of Newfoundland, downing numerous trees and cutting power to 3,500 Newfoundland Power customers. Outages were concentrated across western and central portions of the island. In Hawke's Bay, a shed had its roof blown off. Little rain accompanied the winds, though some roads saw some water buildup. A 230 kg (500 lb) archway over a tombstone in a Deer Lake graveyard was toppled. Along coastal areas, storm surge had limited effects owing to lower tides. Cooler temperatures along the backside of Dorian prompted frost advisories for most of Newfoundland and southern Labrador.

=== Quebec ===
Approximately 4,000 Hydro-Québec customers lost power across the Gaspé Peninsula and 3,000 on the Magdalen Islands. Significant coastal damage occurred across the Magdalen Islands, with roads and cliffs eroded away by powerful waves estimated up to 20 m (66 ft) high. Sand dunes along the eastern shores of the island were completely eroded away, enabling rising waters to destroy many cottages. Sheds and recreational structures were damaged or destroyed by high winds. Particularly hard hit were Cap-aux-Meules and La Grave. Several trailers and one building were damaged on Entry Island.

== Aftermath ==
In the aftermath of the storm, numerous shellfish harvesting areas were shut down. In addition, schools in Nova Scotia were closed for multiple days, and a parking ban was imposed in Halifax.

=== Nova Scotia ===
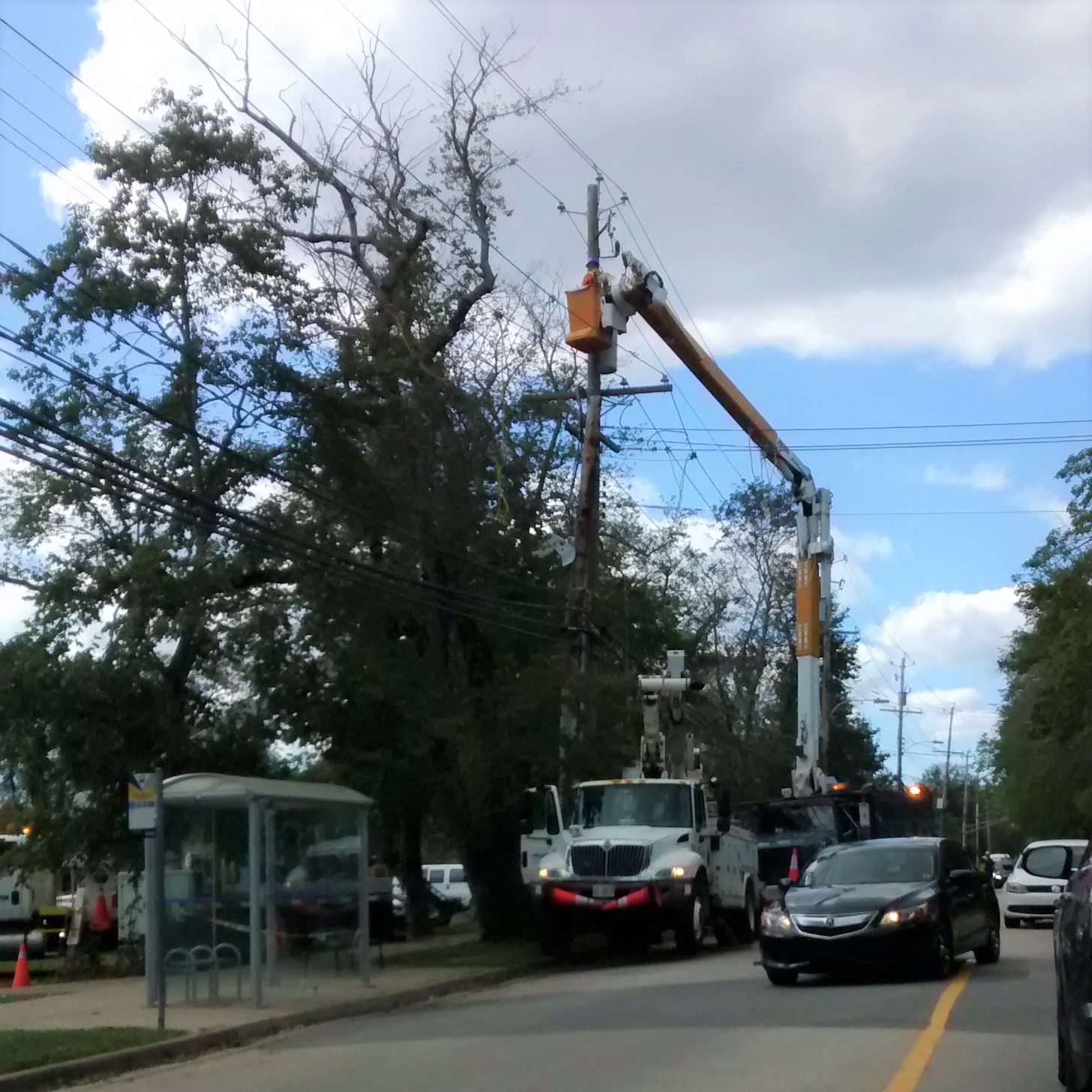
Power crews restoring service on September 10

NSP CEO Karen Hutt described the effects of Dorian as a "worst case scenario". The company dispatched 3 helicopters and 15 ground crews to assess damage to the power grid immediately after the storm. They contracted crews from Nova Scotia and received assistance from New Brunswick, Newfoundland and Labrador, Ontario, Quebec, Maine, and Florida, in what became the largest response in Nova Scotia history with about 600 teams dispatched across the province. NSP identified 385 high-priority areas, namely hospitals and cellphone tower, where the Canadian military accelerated restoration. All substations and transmission lines brought offline during the storm were restored within 81 hours. Poor coordination between the company and power crews led to some delays in restoration as personnel were not adequately informed of where to find housing or food.

The crane collapse at the Olympus building in Halifax displaced people in 21 apartments, closed nearby businesses, and resulted in prolonged traffic issues. Costs to remove the crane exceeded C$2 million and were covered upfront by taxpayers. Provincial officials filed invoices to have Lead Structural Formwork Ltd. and WM Fares Group, the owner of the crane and building it fell from respectively, to reimburse the associated fees. The Labour Department launched an inquiry into the collapse; however, no conclusive results were achieved by December 2020 and a final report was not expected until 2021 due to additional delays caused by the COVID-19 pandemic.

Damage to the province's agriculture strained the livelihood of farmers, with some having to cover losses out of pocket into 2020 as government funding was not allocated by June 2020. Later stressors related to the COVID-19 pandemic exacerbated the problems caused by Dorian. In September, the Nova Scotia Federation of Agriculture determined the damage to agriculture did not meet the criteria for federal funding.

Repair and restoration costs for oft-used Salt Marsh Trail in Halifax reached C$25,500.

Restaurants in Shelburne County provided first responders with hot drinks and food. Comfort shelters were opened for residents in New Waterford.

Approximately 300 soldiers from CFB Gagetown in New Brunswick were deployed to Nova Scotia for cleanup efforts with another 400 placed on standby. The 4 Engineer Support Regiment was directed to Halifax. Crews were dispatched province-wide, primarily assisting with debris removal to expedite power restoration.

=== New Brunswick ===
The Canadian government allowed for up to $160,000 in relief to private homes and $500,000 for non-profits.

The Shediac Marina was closed until June 26, 2020 due to the aftermath of the hurricane, as well as the COVID-19 pandemic. The cost of renovations was estimated at over $1 million.

=== Quebec ===
Mayor of Magdalen Islands Jonathan Lapierre requested emergency funding from Ottawa and Quebec to handle coastal erosion. Quebec allocates C$50 million to combat erosion province-wide, though the Magdalen Islands government stated the entire sum would be needed after Dorian. The extensive damage sustained by rental cottages in Chemin des Chalets led to the Department of Public Security deeming them illegal less than two weeks after the storm. All existing cottages were to be relocated or dismantled. Lapierre made an official request for C$80 million in February 2020 to protect the Magdalen Islands from accelerating erosion. In August 2020, the Government of Quebec pledged C$7 million to construct a 600 m (2,000 ft) protective structure in Cap-aux-Meules.

=== Prince Edward Island ===
On September 14, the Provincial Disaster Assistance Program was activated, allowing affected residents to apply for further financial assistance. A one-time funding program provided 6,000 people with additional assistance, with most receiving C$110 and some receiving C$140. The provincial government provided PEI Food Banks with C$50,000 to get food to affected residents. In early October, the provincial government partnered with the Canadian Red Cross to establish a financial assistance program.

=== Newfoundland ===
Newfoundland Power dispatched crews to restore service during the storm.
