= Effects of Hurricane Dorian in the Caribbean =

Hurricane Dorian
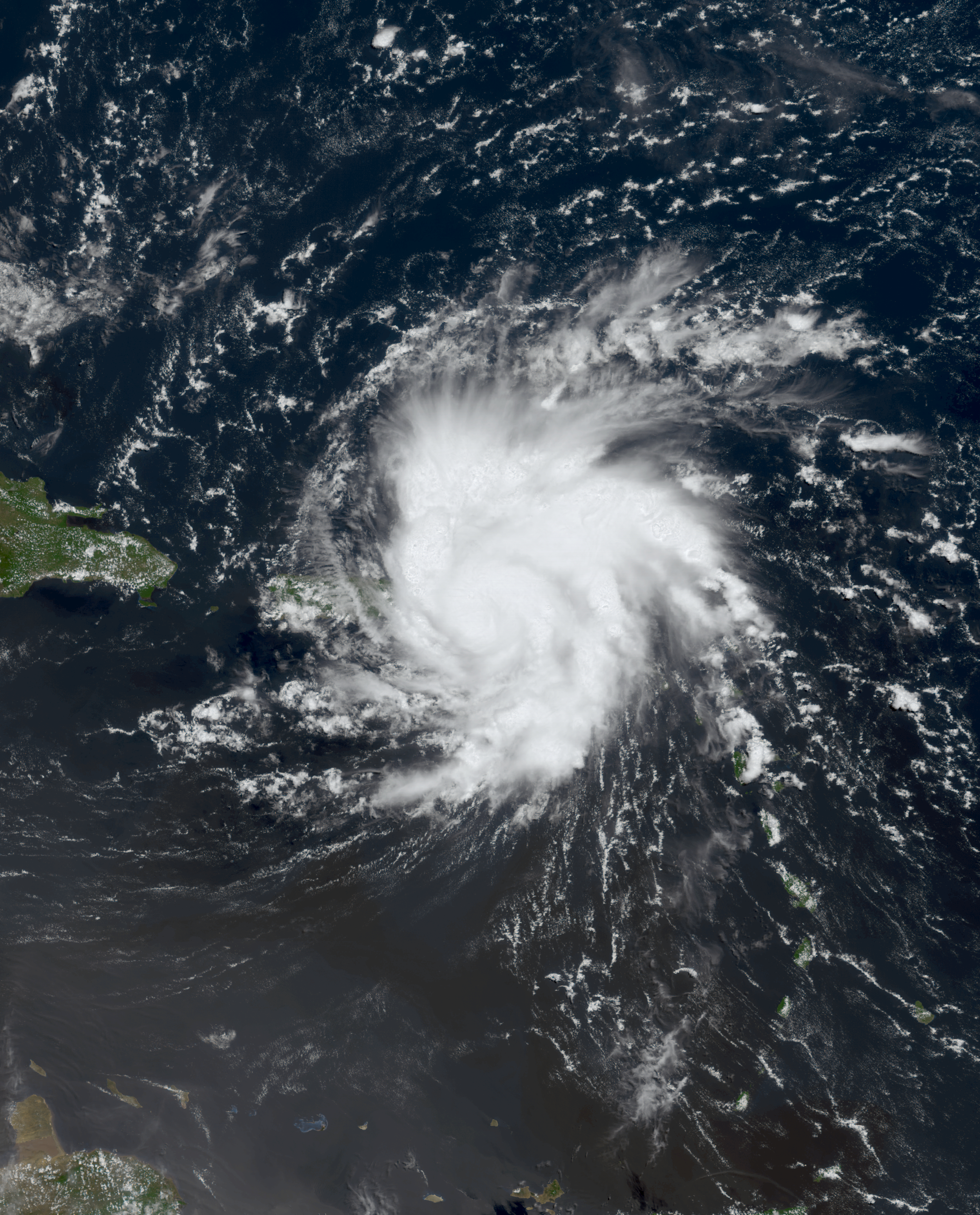
- Hurricane Dorian between the islands of St. Croix and St. Thomas on August 28

Meteorological history
- Duration: August 26–29, 2019

Category 1 hurricane
- 1-minute sustained (SSHWS/NWS)
- Highest winds: 80 mph (130 km/h)
- Highest gusts: 110 mph (175 km/h)
- Lowest pressure: 993 mbar (hPa); 29.32 inHg

Overall effects
- Fatalities: 1 indirect
- Damage: Minimal
- Areas affected: Lesser Antilles, Puerto Rico
- Part of the 2019 Atlantic hurricane season
- History: Meteorological history; Effects: The Caribbean; The Bahamas; The Carolinas; Atlantic Canada; Alabama controversy; Other wikis: Commons: Dorian images

Hurricane Dorian caused relatively minor damage across the eastern Caribbean in late August 2019. Originating from a westward moving tropical wave, Dorian organized into a tropical cyclone on August 24 and reached the Lesser Antilles on August 26 as a tropical storm. Turning northwest, the system unexpectedly intensified to a hurricane as it struck the Virgin Islands on August 27. Antecedent to the storm's arrival, local governments across the archipelago issued tropical cyclone warnings and watches, readied public shelters, closed airports, and placed emergency crews on standby. Many of the threatened islands were still reeling from the devastation wrought by Hurricane Irma and Hurricane Maria in September 2017 and fears arose over embattled power grids. In the areas first affected, impacts were limited to gusty winds and modest rainfall. Effects were greater in the Virgin Islands where wind gusts reached 111 mph (179 km/h); however, damage was light. Multiple landslides occurred across the islands and Puerto Rico with only a handful of structures suffering damage. One person died in Puerto Rico while preparing for the storm.

== Background ==
Hurricane Dorian originated from a tropical wave that departed the west coast of Africa on August 19, 2019. Traveling west across the Atlantic Ocean, the small system acquired organized convection—shower and thunderstorm activity—and coalesced into a tropical depression on August 24 and soon into a tropical storm. Adverse environmental conditions stymied intensification as the cyclone approached the Lesser Antilles. Dorian made successive landfalls in Barbados and St. Lucia on August 27 with maximum sustained winds of 50 mph (80 km/h). Following a reformation of the core, the storm turned northwest and gained strength. Coincident with the formation of an eye, Dorian achieved hurricane strength as it struck St. Croix and St. Thomas shortly thereafter. The latter landfall was the strongest of the hurricane's Caribbean impacts, with sustained winds reaching 80 mph (130 km/h). Over the following days, Dorian intensified and became a Category 5 hurricane before striking the Bahamas on September 1. It caused catastrophic damage in the region, becoming the worst disaster in the country's modern history. Dorian later had damaging effects along the East Coast of the United States and Atlantic Canada. The cyclone dissipated on September 9 over the northern Atlantic Ocean.

== Preparations ==
Early on August 25, a tropical storm watch was issued for the island of Barbados. Later that day, watches and warnings extended to the Caribbean Netherlands, Dominica, Grenada, Martinique, St. Lucia, and Saint Vincent and the Grenadines. A hurricane watch was issued at 15:00 UTC August 26 for Saint Lucia, though this was soon revised to a tropical storm warning. These advisories were gradually discontinued as the storm moved away. Between August 26 and 28, various watches and warnings were raised for Puerto Rico; however, they were ultimately suspended as the storm tracked farther east than anticipated. Late on August 27 and early on August 28, tropical storm warnings were raised for the Virgin Islands. Dorian struck the Virgin Islands on August 28 as it reached hurricane strength. The unexpected intensification of Dorian over the northeastern Caribbean resulted in hurricane warnings being issued too late, with hurricane conditions already impacting the islands at the time of their issuance. All advisories ceased as the hurricane moved away from the Caribbean later on August 28.

In Barbados, Prime Minister Mia Mottley ordered the closure of all schools and advised the nation's residents to remain indoors for the duration of the storm. Public crews worked to clear public drains island-wide. Thirty-eight shelters opened island-wide, with 103 residents seeking refuge in them. All public services were suspended for the duration of the storm. Homeless persons were transported to shelter by emergency personnel. On August 26, St. Lucia prime minister Allen Chastanet announced that the nation would "shut down" for the duration of Dorian and all residents were mandated to stay home. Numerous people ignored this warning, however, and the police detained several people who refused to return home. LIAT cancelled multiple flights across the Lesser Antilles due to the storm. The Department of Infrastructure, Ports, and Energy placed all heavy machinery and equipment owners on standby to assist in cleanup and relief efforts. In Dominica, Prime Minister Roosevelt Skerrit ordered all public sector workers to remain home and prepare for the storm. The devastation from Hurricane Maria in 2017 brought greater vigilance from the public, and Skerrit assured residents that the nation was in a "better place now" than after Maria and there would be "no shutting of the country" for Dorian. The Ministry of Public Works mobilized heavy machinery and the police were placed on high alert to more effectively respond to emergency calls. Small craft advisories and flash flood watches were issued for the island.

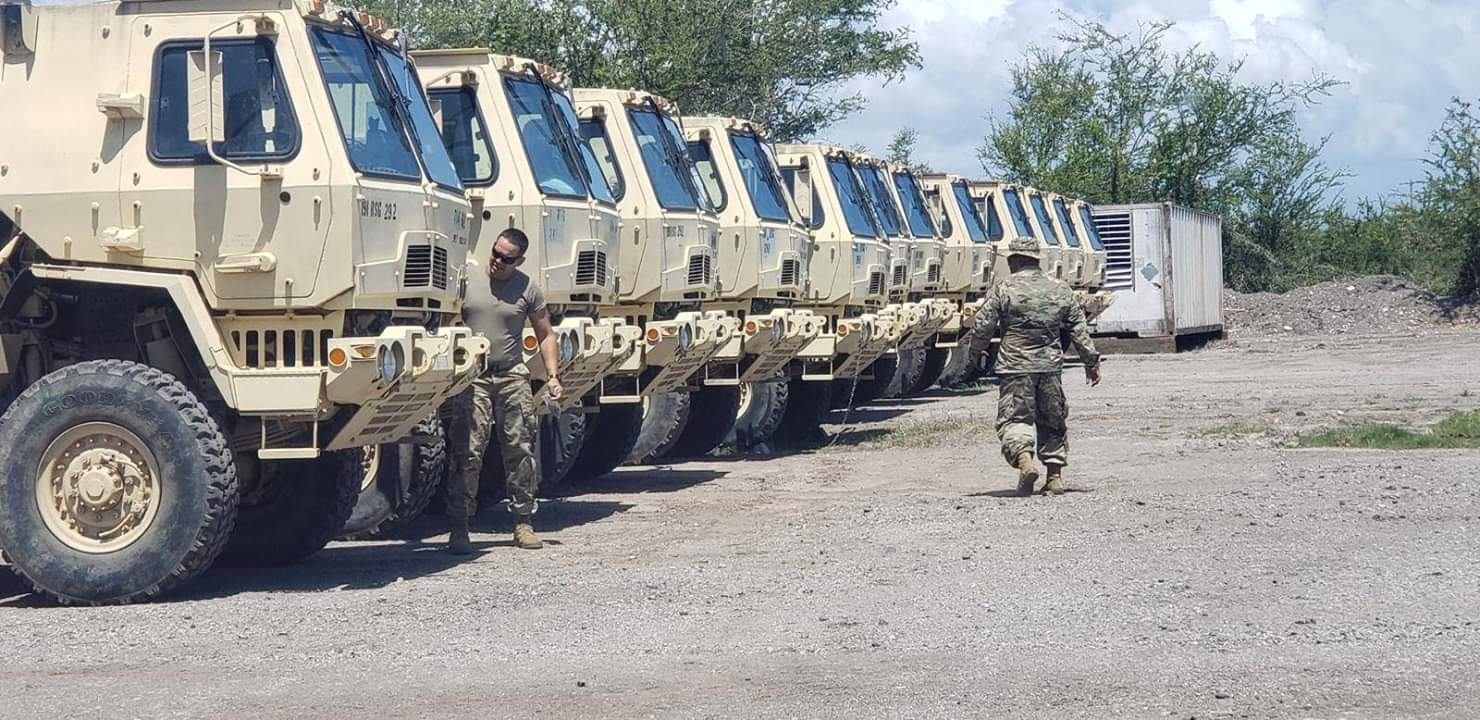
The Puerto Rico National Guard fueled up trucks and generators ahead of the storm's arrival for potential relief efforts.

With Puerto Rico also recovering from Hurricane Maria in 2017, Governor Wanda Vázquez Garced declared a state of emergency for the territory on August 27. The emergency remained in effect until September 6. The following day, the Puerto Rico National Guard was activated to support any relief operations related to the storm. Hundreds of vehicles, generators, and water trucks were fueled and filled to be ready for deployment. Fears centered around the still-unstable power grid which was largely destroyed by Maria. In some areas, power lines remained affixed to palm trees. Hundreds of utility workers were deployed to quickly fix any power outages. Top government officials reported adequate supplies ahead of the storm; however, some local governors indicated a lack of generators and proper public shelters. An estimated 30,000 homes still had damaged roofs from the 2017 hurricane. Residents boarded up windows with plywood and stocked up on bottled water and generators. All government offices and schools closed for the duration of the hurricane. Territory-wide, 360 shelters with a collective capacity of 48,500 persons opened; 24,000 cots were distributed to these shelters. Private organizations worked quickly in Vieques to ensure the safety of residents. Fearing isolation from mainland Puerto Rico, ViequesLove established a 32-radio network to keep residents, church leaders, emergency responders, and businesses connected and informed of the hurricane. Volunteers supplied the island's local shelter with a generator.

Similar to Puerto Rico, the Virgin Islands were still recovering from hurricanes Irma and Maria in 2017. A state of emergency was declared for the United States Virgin Islands on August 28, and a curfew was enacted for the duration of the hurricane. All airports and seaports suspended operations. The Government of the British Virgin Islands opened seven shelters territory-wide. A mandatory curfew was put in place from 2:00 p.m. on August 28 to 6:00 a.m. on August 29. Thirty-five people utilized public shelters. The American Red Cross readied tarps for any buildings with roof damage. Auguste George Airport, Cyril E. King Airport, Virgin Gorda Airport, and Terrance B. Lettsome International Airport closed for the duration of the storm. The majority of the British Virgin Islands' clinics and hospitals suspended operations during the hurricane; however, a few remained open.

== Impact ==
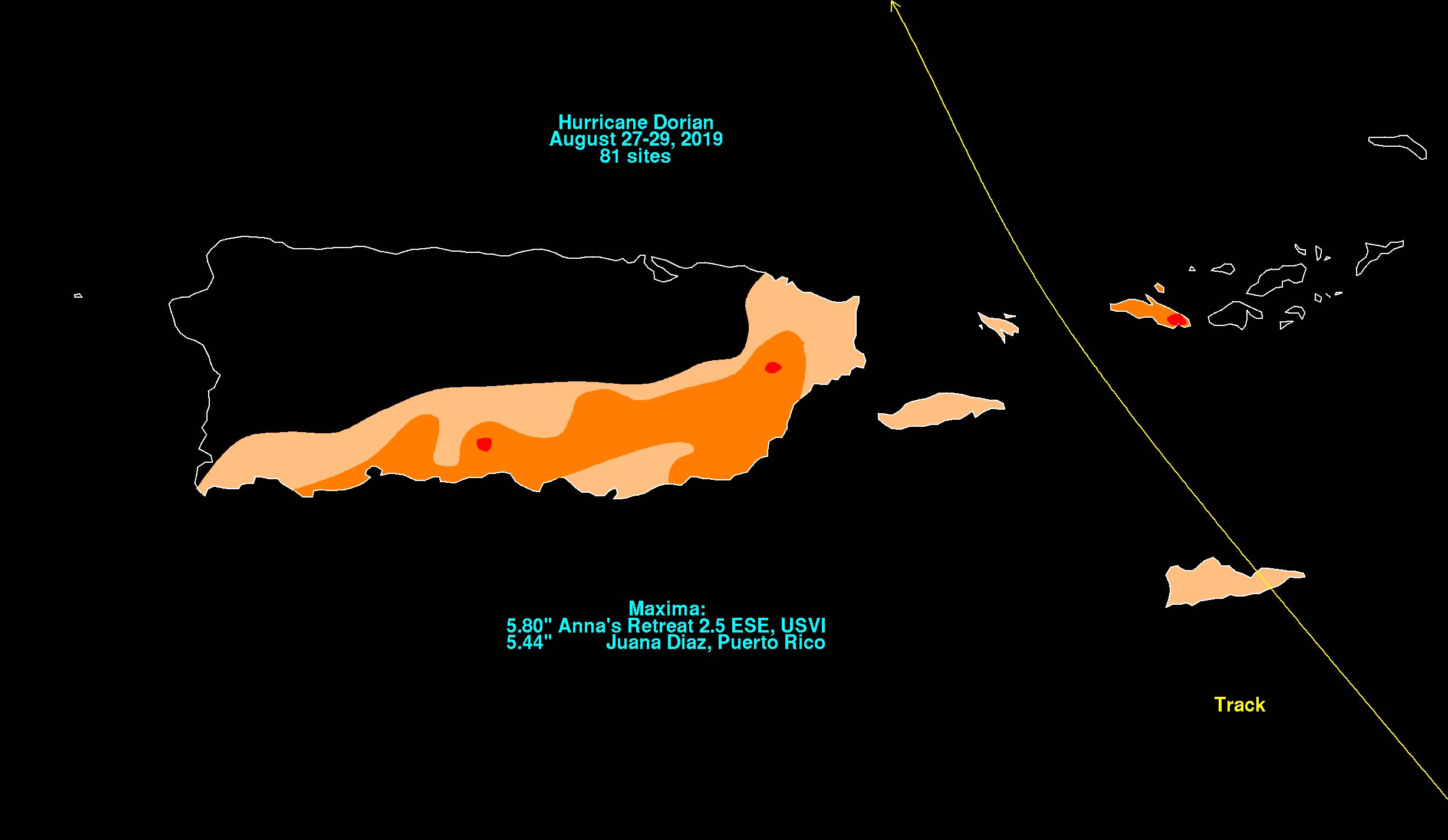
Map of rainfall associated with Hurricane Dorian in Puerto Rico and the United States Virgin Islands

On August 26, winds began to pick up in the Lesser Antilles and water levels along the coast began to rise. Wind gusts in Barbados reached 55 mph (89 km/h), downing trees and power lines. Some residences in southern Barbados lost power and water service. Overall, Dorian caused little damage in Barbados, with only one home suffering damage in Saint Peter. Isolated interruptions to power occurred on St. Lucia; no damage occurred otherwise in the nation. In Martinique, heavy rains—peaking at 102 mm (4.0 in) in Rivière-Pilote—and winds up to 61 mph (98 km/h) caused minor damage. Approximately 4,000 homes lost power and many streets became impassable due to flooding; one road was washed out. Flooding affected some homes and businesses in Rivière-Pilote; however, overall damage was negligible. Heavy showers in Dominica left multiple communities without power and water; however, effects were otherwise limited. Rainfall extended north to Guadeloupe were accumulations reached 121 mm (4.8 in) in Matouba.

Striking the Virgin Islands as an intensifying hurricane, Dorian brought strong winds and heavy rains to the region. Precipitation reached 5.8 in (150 mm) at Anna's Retreat on St. Thomas. On St. Croix, the first island impacted, winds reached 59 mph (95 km/h) with gusts to 75 mph (121 km/h). A private weather station in Saint Thomas observed ten-minute sustained winds of 72 mph (116 km/h) and gusts to 97 mph (156 km/h). The greatest winds occurred on Buck Island with sustained winds of 82 mph (132 km/h) and a peak gust of 111 mph (179 km/h). Island-wide blackouts occurred on Saint Thomas and Saint John, while 25,000 customers lost power on Saint Croix. Service was largely restored within a day. The high winds downed trees across the islands. Along the coast, multiple boats broke from their moorings and washed ashore. Several boaters required rescue when their yacht Summer Star ran aground in Perseverance Bay and the Midnight Rambler became disabled 100 yd (91 m) from Water Island. The Virgin Islands Department of Planning and Natural Resources cleared the wreck of Summer Star in February 2020. Some flooding and landslides occurred on Tortola in the British Virgin Islands, blocking several roadways. Significant flooding and some structural damage occurred along the outskirts of Road Town, including a mall that had its roof partially removed by storm-force gusts. Downed trees knocked out power to residences on Virgin Gorda. Swells from the storm deposited significant amounts of Sargassum along the shores of Anegada.

Because the hurricane moved farther northeast than initially anticipated, its effects in Puerto Rico were relatively limited. Rainbands associated with the hurricane produced gusty winds and heavy rain on August 28–29. The heaviest rains were concentrated on the southern and eastern coasts of the island, peaking at 5.44 in (138 mm) in Juana Díaz. Wind gusts in Culebra reached 62 and 35 mph (100 and 56 km/h) in San Juan. Approximately 23,000 households lost power across the territory. A man in Bayamón died when he fell off his roof trying to clean drains in advance of the storm. Flash floods, rockslides, and mudslides impacted multiple counties with a few disrupting travel. One person was trapped by floodwaters near Humacao. Elsewhere, The Blanco, Guayanés, and Marín rivers topped their banks, submerging local roadways.
