= Chinese Taipei Athletics Association =

Governing body of athletics in Taiwan

Coordinates: 25.049858°N 121.539323°E

Chinese Athletics Association
- 中華民國田徑協會
- Sport: Athletics
- Abbreviation: CTAA
- Affiliation: World Athletics
- Regional affiliation: Asian Athletics Association (AAA)
- Headquarters: Zhongshan, Taipei
- President: Yeh Chen-yen
- Secretary: Wang Ching-cheng

Official website
- Athletics.org.tw
- (Taiwan)

Te Chinese Taipei Athletics Association (CTAA; Chinese: 中華民國田徑協會) is a World Athletics-recognised member officially representing Taiwan. The current president is Yeh Chen-yen, and the General Secretary is Wang Ching-cheng. The office is based in the building of Taiwan Sports Administration in Taipei City.
