= Télécoms Sans Frontières =

- Abbreviation: TSF
- Formation: 1998
- Type: NGO
- Purpose: Humanitarian
- Headquarters: Pau
- Region served: World
- Official language: French, English
- President: Jean-François Cazenave
- Director: Monique Lanne-Petit
- Website: https://tsfi.org/

Télécoms Sans Frontières (TSF) is an emergency technology non-governmental organization, which intervenes in the context of humanitarian crises, conflict zones and areas hit by natural disasters to set up satellite communication for the affected populations and humanitarian organisations.

== History ==
During different humanitarian experiences throughout the first Gulf War, and the Balkan war between 1991 and 1997, TSF’s founders realised that in addition to healthcare and food there was a real need for telecommunications in emergency contexts.

To meet this need, TSF was founded in 1998 and officially started its operations in the field with its first mission during the Kosovo War to offer satellite phone calls to the refugees fleeing the conflict. During the following years, TSF expanded its operations supporting also the actors working in the aftermath of humanitarian crises. In 2001 the first telecommunication centre was established in Afghanistan to help international NGOs active in the area with satellite internet communication systems.

Between 2003 and 2006 TSF opened two regional offices in Thailand and Nicaragua (the current regional office for the Americas opened in Mexico in 2016) and became a partner of two international clusters in humanitarian aid: the Directorate-General for European Civil Protection and Humanitarian Aid Operations (ECHO) and the Emergency Telecoms Cluster (ETC) founded by the United Nations Office for the Coordination of Humanitarian Affairs and supervised by UNICEF, the United Nations International Children's Emergency Fund (currently ETC is led by the World Food Programme).

== Organisation ==
TSF has its headquarters in Pau (France) and two regional offices in Bangkok (Thailand) and Guadalajara (Mexico).

Two TSF representatives are also located in Washington, D.C., and London to support TSF’s partnership development activities.

The governance of the organisation is ensured by a board of directors, which defines and approves the strategic direction and the financial budgets. It ensures that TSF's actions are in line with the mission and the values of TSF. The members of the Board are:

- Jean-François Cazenave - President
- Robert Chassagnieux - Vice-President
- Jean-Claude Laurent - General Secretary
- François Meyer - Treasurer
- Christiane Constant - Non-executive board member
- Daniel Nataf - Non-executive board member

== Activities ==
TSF’s main areas of intervention include disaster response, capacity building, education, bridging the digital divide and protection and assistance.

- Disaster response: in the aftermath of natural disasters or humanitarian crises, TSF sets up satellite phone call services and internet connections to the affected populations and the other humanitarian actors active in the emergency.
- Capacity Building: TSF organises training activities for local governments, INGOs, and other international bodies to train them on the use of technologies in emergencies.
- Education: TSF implements projects to provide education opportunities through digital technologies to children in areas affected by conflicts or humanitarian crises.
- Bridging the digital divide: TSF creates ICT centres in unconnected areas to provide different kinds of ICT Services, such as internet connection and different digital skills training programmes, to the local population, including schools, health organisations, NGOs and other local associations.
- Protection and assistance: TSF implements activities to assist victims of prolonged situations of instability and crises, caused by climate change, natural disasters or conflicts. These activities include telediagnosis, early warning systems, mHealth, food security, data collection and SMS alert.

== Expertise ==
- Emergency call centre (TECC): Telecommunication system that enables the use of IP-based communications in humanitarian emergency situations.
- Instant Network mini: Satellite-based GSM base station developed by TSF and Vodafone Foundation to set up temporary mobile networks in emergency situations.
- mLearning kit: The kit consists of Android tablets, a low-consumption server of digital educational content (Raspberry Pi), a laptop and a Wi-Fi router to share the connection and create the network. The whole kit is battery-powered to be able to run autonomously for 1 day.
- Humanitarian information display system: Remotely managed digital display system for disseminating information on migration routes and in refugee camps.
- Mobile Satellite Services (MSS): Portable satellite terminals which can provide Internet access, telephony or both.
- Fixed satellite Services (FSS): Generally referred to as VSAT services, they are deployed in remote areas, refugee camps and in the first hours of a natural disaster to provide Internet connectivity to the benefit of NGOs working in the field and the populations they are supporting.
- Information collection: Information gathering systems via the Internet or SMS aimed to, for example, estimate the number of people affected by a disaster, assess the vulnerability rate of a population or measure the impact of an action.

== Partners ==
- Inmarsat
- Vodafone Foundation
- Eutelsat
- AT&T
- European Community Humanitarian Aid Office
- Thales Foundation
- PCCW Global
- Capacity Media
- Evox trading - VoIP Carrier
- IT Cup
- Communauté d'agglomération de Pau-Pyrénées
- Friends of Telecoms Without Borders
- Speedcast
