= Taoyuan Sports Federation =

Organization based in Taoyuan District, Taoyuan City, Taiwan

Taoyuan Sports Federation (TSF; Chinese: 桃園市體育會) is a non-government organisation, sanctioned by Taoyuan City government, responsible for sports administration in Taoyuan City in Taiwan with nearly 82 sports committees under the federation. The office is located in the 2nd floor of the Taoyuan Stadium. Current President is Mr. Cheng-Yen YEH, the General Secretary is Mr Ching-Cheng WANG, and three Deputy General Secretary - Dr. Ping-Kun CHUIU, Dr. Shih-Chung CHENG and coach Ching-Chung YU.

== See also ==
- Sports in Taiwan
