= Hurricane Dorian–Alabama controversy =

2019 American political controversy

The Hurricane Dorian–Alabama controversy, also referred to as Sharpiegate, arose from a tweet made by then-US president Donald Trump on September 1, 2019, as Hurricane Dorian approached the U.S. mainland. The comment incorrectly mentioned Alabama when listing states that would be hit by the hurricane. After many Alabamians called the local weather bureau to ask about it, the bureau issued a reassurance that their state was not expected to be hit.

Donald J. Trump
(@realDonaldTrump)
tweeted:

In addition to Florida - South Carolina, North Carolina, Georgia, and Alabama, will most likely be hit (much) harder than anticipated. Looking like one of the largest hurricanes ever. Already category 5. BE CAREFUL! GOD BLESS EVERYONE!

September 1, 2019

Over the following week, Trump repeatedly and falsely insisted his comment had been correct. On September 4, he showed reporters a weather map which had been altered with a black Sharpie marker to falsely show the hurricane on track to hit Alabama. He also reportedly ordered his aides to obtain an official retraction of the weather bureau's comment that the storm was not headed for Alabama. On September 6, the National Oceanic and Atmospheric Administration (NOAA) published an unsigned statement in support of Trump's initial claim, saying that National Hurricane Center (NHC) models "demonstrated that tropical-storm-force winds from Hurricane Dorian could impact Alabama."

Two agencies investigated allegations that the Trump administration exerted political influence over NOAA. The National Academy of Public Administration (NAPA) report, released on June 15, 2020, found that Neil Jacobs, the acting NOAA administrator, and Julie Kay Roberts, the former NOAA deputy chief of staff and communications director, twice violated codes of the agency's scientific integrity policy with their involvement in the NOAA statement. On July 9, the inspector general of the United States Department of Commerce issued a report confirming that Commerce officials had responded to orders from the White House which resulted in the statement issued by NOAA. In January 2022, the scientific integrity task force of the Biden administration's National Science and Technology Council published a general report on protecting scientific integrity.

== Original comment ==
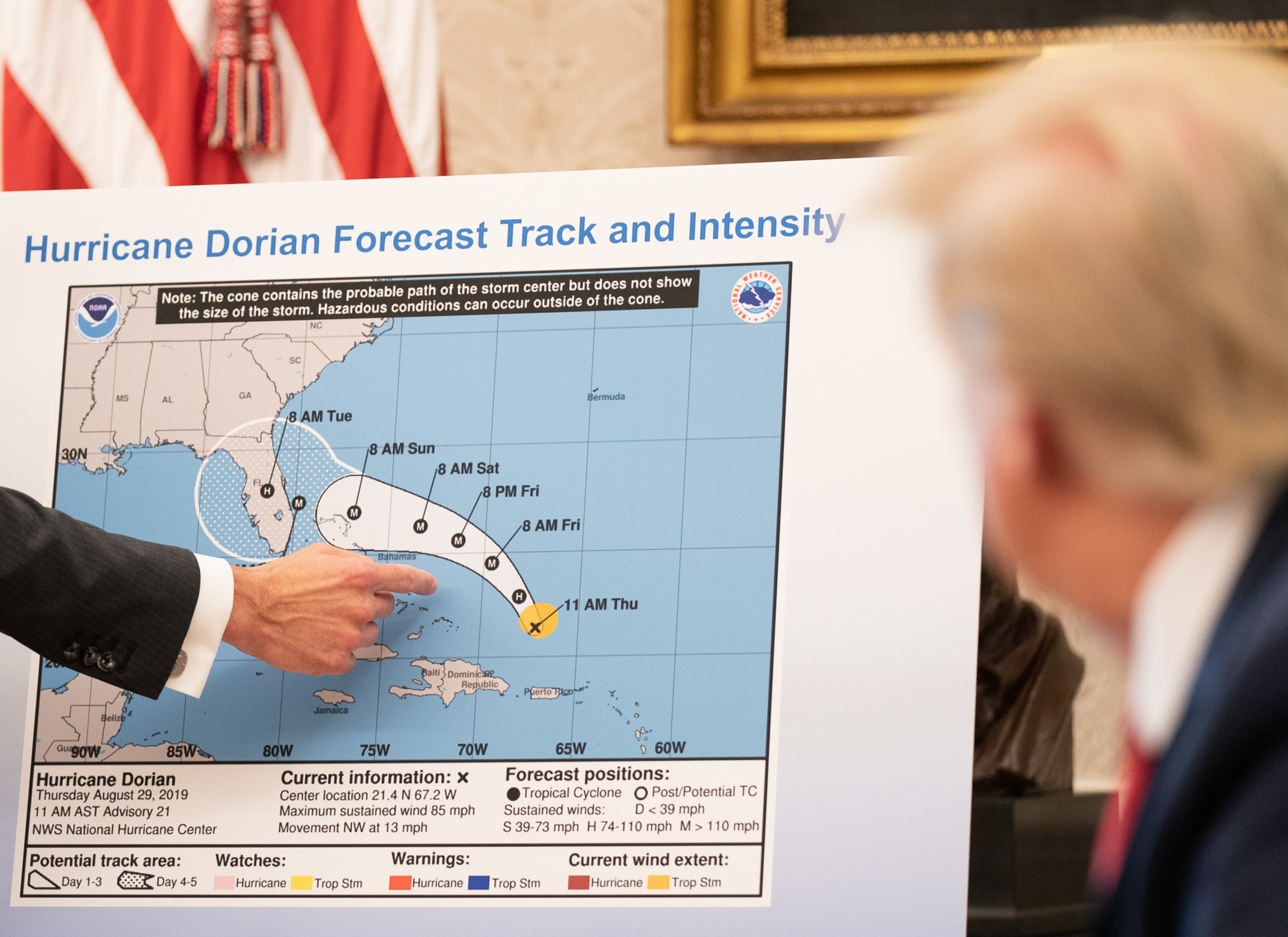
President Trump receives an update on Hurricane Dorian on August 29, 2019. This map was later altered to indicate, falsely, that Dorian would hit Alabama.

In a tweet about the approaching hurricane on September 1, 2019, Trump said that "South Carolina, North Carolina, Georgia, and Alabama will most likely be hit (much) harder than anticipated." By that date, no weather forecaster was predicting that Dorian would hit Alabama, and eight National Hurricane Center forecast updates over the preceding 24 hours showed Dorian steering well away from Alabama and moving up the Atlantic coast. Trump, who had (on August 29) canceled his trip to Poland to monitor the hurricane, was apparently relying on information that was several days old. About 20 minutes after Trump's tweet, the Birmingham, Alabama, office of the National Weather Service (NWS) issued a tweet that contradicted Trump, saying that Alabama "will NOT see any impacts from Dorian". On September 9, NWS director Louis Uccellini said that the Birmingham NWS had not been responding to Trump's tweet, but rather to a flood of phone calls and social media contacts their office had received asking if the hurricane was going to hit Alabama. "Only later, when the retweets and politically based comments started coming to their office, did they learn the sources of this information," he said. He added that the Birmingham office "did what any office would do to protect the public", counteracting the wrong information to "stop public panic" and "ensure public safety".

Later, on September 1, Trump falsely told reporters that the storm was indeed threatening Alabama. Over the following days, as the hurricane moved up the coast and Alabama felt no effects from it, Trump insisted repeatedly and falsely that he had been right about the hurricane threatening the state. On September 2, he criticized a reporter who had fact-checked his comment, falsely saying he had been right and the fact-check was "phony".

== Altered map ==
President Trump displays the altered map in a video published by the White House on September 4, 2019.

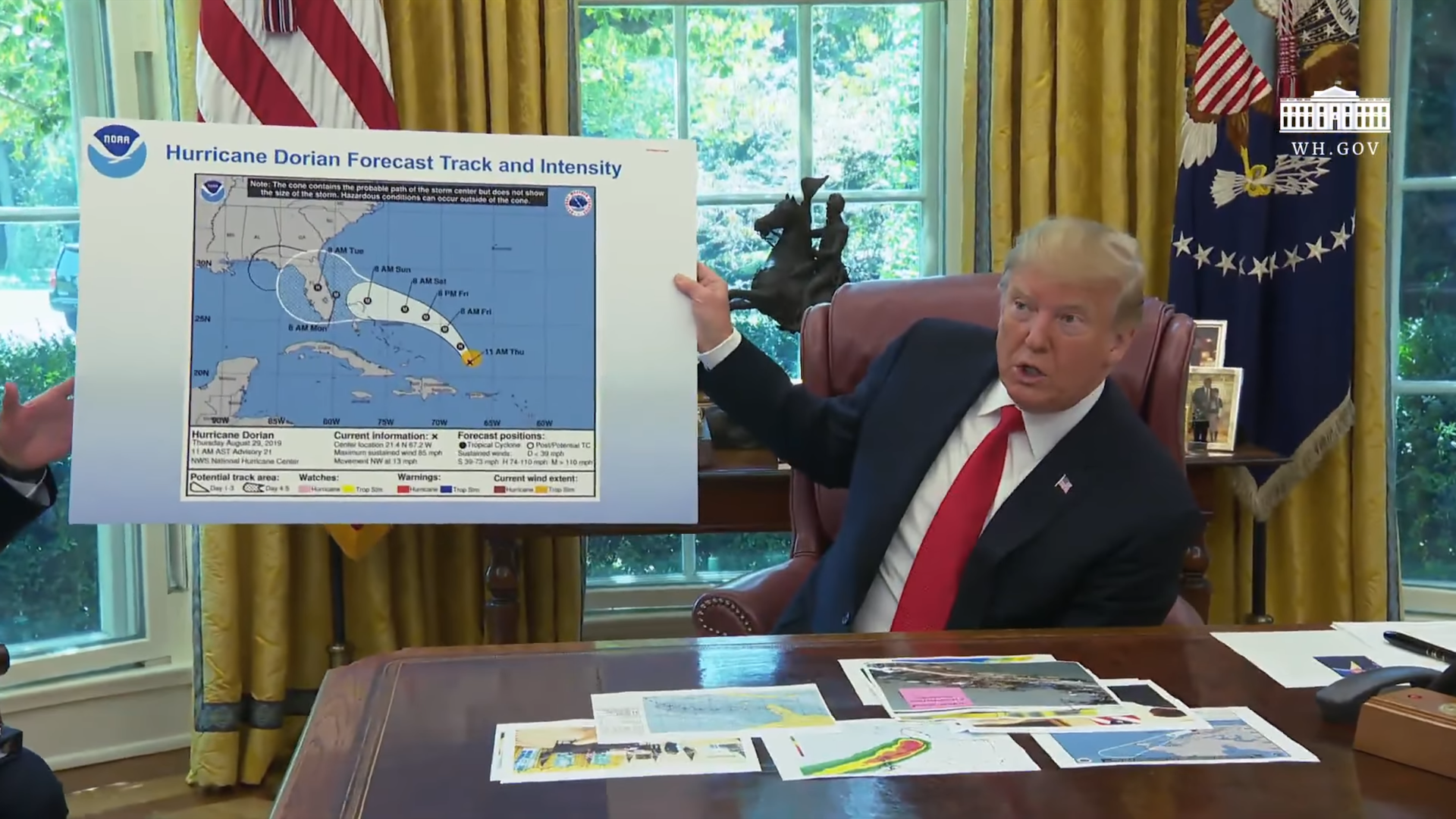
A frame from the above video with Trump displaying the altered map

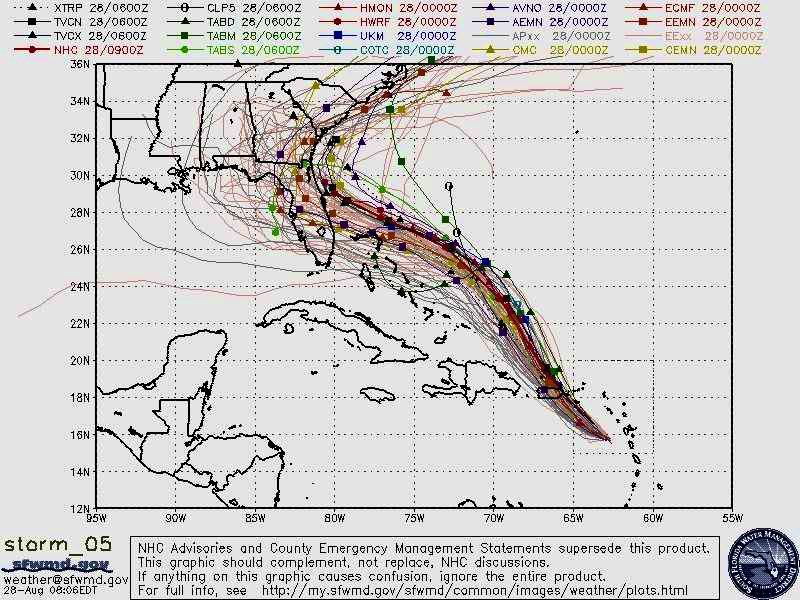
Spaghetti plot used by Trump later on the same day to support his assertion that the hurricane was predicted to pass over Alabama

On September 4, 2019, in the Oval Office, Trump displayed the National Hurricane Center's August 29 diagram of Dorian's projected track. The diagram had an oddly misshapen line, apparently drawn with a black marker, which added an additional lobe to the cone of uncertainty of the hurricane's possible path which included southern Alabama. Public reaction ranged from mild skepticism to derision; Trump said he did not know how the map came to be modified. The map incident resulted in the hashtag "Sharpiegate" trending on Twitter – using Sharpie as a generic trademark – with people posting invented versions of other photos modified by a marker.

While Trump had previously been known to use a Sharpie to write on documents during his presidency and while on the campaign trail, he stated he was unsure who made the alteration on the map. He stated he had "a better map" with models that "in all cases [showed] Alabama was hit." Later the same day, Trump tweeted a map by the South Florida Water Management District dated August 28, four days before his September 1 tweet, showing a spaghetti plot of Dorian's path. Trump incorrectly asserted "almost all models" showed Dorian hitting Alabama, even though the map showed most simulated paths would not enter that state. A note on the map stated that "NHC Advisories and County Emergency Management Statements supersede this product" and that the graphic was to be ignored if it caused confusion. Trump also falsely said his briefings had included a "95% chance" that the storm would strike Alabama and that "Alabama was hit very hard – was going to be hit very hard."

The Washington Post reported that NOAA had twice ordered National Weather Service employees not to provide "any opinion" on Hurricane Dorian and to "only stick with official National Hurricane Center forecasts". The first order came after Trump's September 1 comments and the Birmingham NWS office's public advisory in contradiction of Trump. The second order came on September 4, after Trump displayed the altered map.

Following a Freedom of Information Act request by BuzzFeed News, the White House released more than 1,000 internal NOAA emails on January 31, 2020. In an internal NOAA email, staffer Corey Pieper confirmed to NWS director of public affairs Susan Buchanan on September 4 that the map "was doctored" after the latter received an inquiry from NBC. Neil Jacobs, Assistant Secretary of Commerce for Environmental Observation and Prediction, wrote in an email to another NOAA scientist, "you have no idea how hard I'm fighting to keep politics out of science." Responding to an inquiry from ABC News about the controversy, one internal NOAA email simply read, "HELP!!!" NOAA acting chief scientist Craig McLean reacted to the unsigned NOAA statement in an email to other NOAA officials; McLean added, "what concerns me most is that this administration is eroding the public trust in NOAA for an apparent political recovery from an ill timed and imprecise moment from the president."

== NOAA statement ==
On September 6, NOAA published an unsigned statement in support of Trump's initial claim, saying that National Hurricane Center (NHC) models "demonstrated that tropical-storm-force winds from Hurricane Dorian could impact Alabama." The statement also said the tweet from the Birmingham NWS office was incorrect because it "spoke in absolute terms that were inconsistent with probabilities from the best forecast products available at the time." The September 6 statement contradicted NOAA's September 1 statement that the "current forecast path of Dorian does not include Alabama."

The September 6 statement led to pushback from meteorologists, including from the president of the NWS Employees Organization, who commented that the statement was "political", "utterly disgusting and disingenuous", and with "no scientific basis". The Commerce Department's Inspector General Peggy E. Gustafson said the next day that she was investigating the statement and directed NOAA employees to preserve all communications related to it. In a message to NOAA staff members, she wrote that the NWS "must maintain standards of scientific integrity," adding that the statement called into question "the NWS's processes, scientific independence, and ability to communicate accurate and timely weather warnings and data to the nation in times of national emergency."

On September 9, The New York Times reported that Wilbur Ross, the commerce secretary of the United States, had called the acting administrator of NOAA, Neil Jacobs, and ordered him to undo the department's apparent contradiction of Trump. Jacobs objected, but was told that the top officials of NOAA would be fired if the disagreement was not resolved. The Commerce Department later issued a partial denial, saying "Secretary Ross did not threaten to fire any NOAA staff over forecasting and public statements about Hurricane Dorian." Craig N. McLean, NOAA's acting chief scientist, said he would investigate how the resulting September 6 statement was issued. "The content of this press release is very concerning as it compromises the ability of NOAA to convey life-saving information necessary to avoid substantial and specific danger to public health and safety," he said. "I am pursuing the potential violations of our NOAA Administrative Order on Scientific Integrity."

On September 11, it was reported that Ross had been told by acting White House chief of staff Mick Mulvaney to arrange for NOAA to support Trump's version of events and disavow the Birmingham message. According to The Washington Post, Trump himself told his staff they needed to get the contradiction fixed. The Post's sources say that Ross conveyed the message but did not threaten any firings. Trump denied the report saying, "It's a hoax by the media. That's just fake news".

Members of the House Committee on Science, Space, and Technology, which has jurisdiction over NOAA, launched an investigation into the Commerce Department's interactions with NOAA regarding Dorian. They are specifically interested in the two directives from NOAA to the National Weather Service and the issuance of the September 6 statement.

== Investigations ==
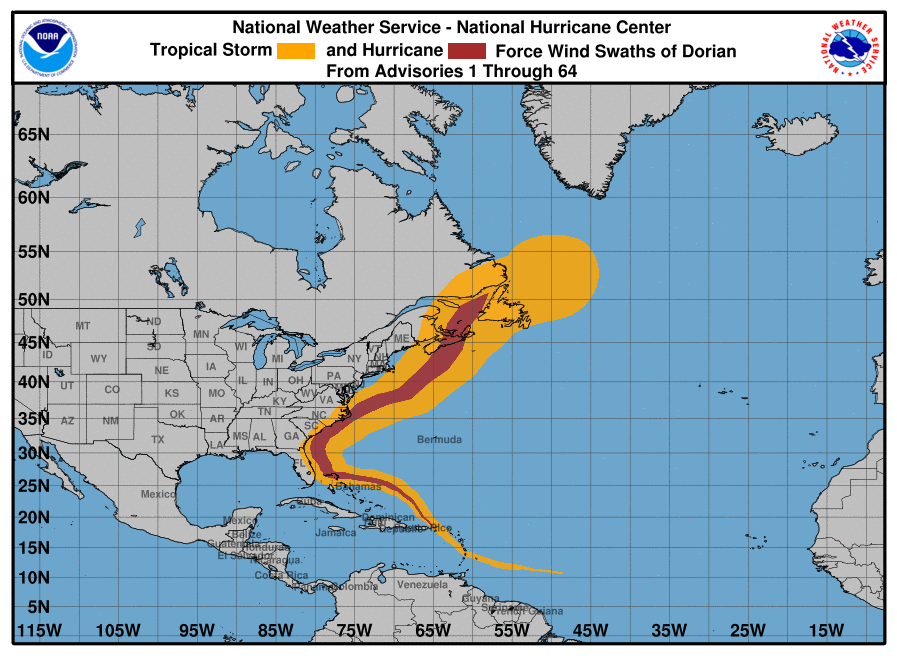
Hurricane Dorian wind history from NOAA

On June 15, 2020, the first of three investigations that looked into the September 6, 2019, NOAA statement that backed Trump's false statement about the path of Hurricane Dorian was released. The report found that both Neil Jacobs, the acting NOAA administrator, and Julie Kay Roberts, the former NOAA deputy chief of staff and communications director, twice violated codes of the agency's scientific integrity policy amid their involvement in the NOAA statement. Craig McLean, NOAA's acting chief scientist, who had immediately called for a scientific misconduct investigation after the Sept. 6 statement, commented on the results of the investigation: "If not the single highest person in NOAA, who will stand for the Scientific Integrity of the agency and the trust our public needs to invest in our scientific process and products?" Both Jacobs and Roberts denied wrongdoing.

On July 9, 2020, the inspector general of the Commerce Department, Peggy Gustafson, an appointee of President Barack Obama, issued a report confirming that Commerce officials had responded to orders from the White House which resulted in the statement issued by NOAA on September 6, 2019. The second of three investigations, the inspector general's examination of the NOAA decision to back Trump's Alabama assertions was the only one that was granted interviews with senior Commerce Department officials and secured access to White House communications. The report concluded: "The Statement undercut the NWS's forecasts and potentially undercut public trust in NOAA's and the NWS's science and the apolitical nature of that science." Gustafson also commented that the scandal could have broader repercussions in 2020 because hurricane-prone states, such as Texas and Florida, were also being heavily affected by the coronavirus pandemic.

On January 11, 2022, the Biden administration's scientific integrity task force of the National Science and Technology Council released "Protecting the Integrity of Government Science", a comprehensive report in collaboration with 29 separate federal agencies. The findings were structured as a general review of the government's current scientific policies as well as their ability to prevent political interference in the future. The report summarized the two previous investigations by NAPA and the Commerce Department into the September 6, 2019, NOAA statement and discussed ways to prevent the same kind of political interference from occurring again.

== Commentary ==
Robert Reich called Trump's behavior irrational. "I think we have to face the truth that no one seems to want to admit. This is no longer a case of excessive narcissism or grandiosity. We're not simply dealing with an unusually large ego [...] The president of the United States is seriously, frighteningly, dangerously unstable. And he's getting worse by the day."

Timothy L. O'Brien called Trump "unstable" and said "the world is in danger". "NOAA, an agency built on science and data engineered to provide reliable, impartial information and serve the public interest, wound up purging science and data from its public profile to cover for Trump. This is how good government decays when it's compromised by a cult of personality." Cliff Mass, a professor of atmospheric sciences at the University of Washington, published a blog post on the incident, noting that Neil Jacobs was being inappropriately attacked for simply trying to defend his agency.

== Legality ==
The alteration of official government weather forecasts is illegal per 18 U.S.C. § 2074, a code which applies to the National Hurricane Center under NOAA's National Weather Service. The law states: "Whoever knowingly issues or publishes any counterfeit weather forecast or warning of weather conditions falsely representing such forecast or warning to have been issued or published by the Weather Bureau, United States Signal Service, or other branch of the Government service, shall be fined under this title or imprisoned not more than ninety days, or both."

== See also ==
- False or misleading statements by Donald Trump § Hurricane Dorian
- Trump administration political interference with science agencies
- Deportation of Kilmar Abrego Garcia § Tattoos
