= Effects of Hurricane Dorian in the Carolinas =

Hurricane Dorian
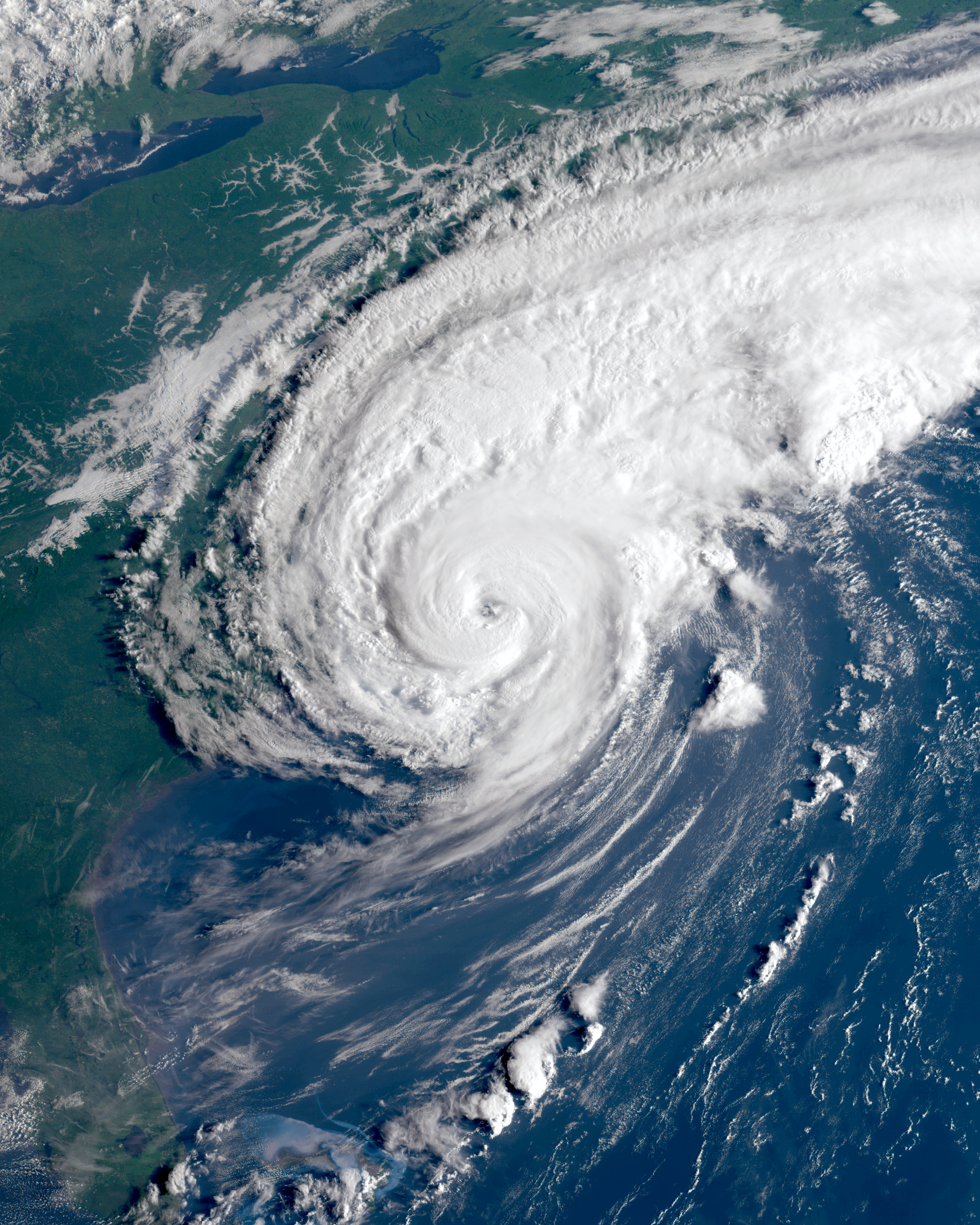
- Hurricane Dorian making landfall in North Carolina on September 6

Meteorological history
- Duration: September 5–7, 2019

Category 2 hurricane
- 1-minute sustained (SSHWS/NWS)
- Highest winds: 100 mph (155 km/h)
- Highest gusts: 110 mph (175 km/h)
- Lowest pressure: 956 mbar (hPa); 28.23 inHg

Overall effects
- Fatalities: 5 total (2 direct, 3 indirect)
- Damage: $1.2 billion (2019 USD)
- Areas affected: East Coast of the United States
- Part of the 2019 Atlantic hurricane season
- History: Meteorological history; Effects: The Caribbean; The Bahamas; The Carolinas; Atlantic Canada; Alabama controversy; Other wikis: Commons: Dorian images

Hurricane Dorian caused severe flooding and hurricane-force winds over parts of the coastal Carolinas during early September 2019. After stalling over The Bahamas for three days as a Category 5 hurricane, Dorian proceeded generally to the northwest, before moving along the Atlantic Coast, striking the town of Buxton, North Carolina, on September 6.

As Dorian moved closer to the Carolinas, both North and South Carolina were put under states of emergencies. More than 830,000 people were evacuated in South Carolina, and around 401,000 people were evacuated in North Carolina before the storm. People who failed to comply with these mandatory evacuations were charged with misdemeanors. Hurricane watches and warnings were issued along the Carolinian coast. Construction along evacuation routes was suspended, and more than 2,400 employees from the North Carolina Department of Transportation (NCDOT) were deployed to help respond to the anticipated impacts of Dorian.

Along the Carolinian coast, 25 tornadoes were reported, though most of them were weak and short-lived. While few of these tornadoes resulted in significant impact, two longer-lived, EF2 strength tornadoes in North Carolina caused at least $2 million in property damage in Sunset Beach and Emerald Isle. Heavy rainfall led to flash flooding, putting more than 100 sq mi (260 km^{2}) of land under more than 1 ft (0.30 m) of water. The highest gust, 110 mph (175 km/h), was recorded at the Cedar Island Ferry Terminal on Cape Lookout. Almost every building in the Outer Banks sustained wind or flood damage. More than 400,000 people were left without power in both North and South Carolina. The hurricane left $1.2 billion (2019 USD) in damage in the Carolinas, with most of it occurring in North Carolina. Five people were killed by the storm; three indirect deaths in North Carolina, and two direct deaths in South Carolina.

== Background and preparations ==
=== Meteorological history ===
Dorian developed from a tropical wave on August 24 over the Central Atlantic. The storm moved through the Lesser Antilles, and became a hurricane just east of Puerto Rico on August 28. Dorian proceeded to undergo rapid intensification over the next few days, before reaching its peak as a Category 5 hurricane with one-minute sustained winds of 185 mph (295 km/h) by September 1. After stalling over The Bahamas, Dorian weakened and moved northwestward on September 3, parallel to the east coast of Florida. The hurricane turned to the northeast and made landfall at Cape Hatteras, North Carolina, at Category 2 intensity on September 6, with 100 mph (155 km/h) winds and a pressure of 957 mbar (28.26 inHg). Dorian continued to the northeast and later transitioned into an extratropical cyclone, eventually dissipating near Greenland on September 10.

=== South Carolina ===
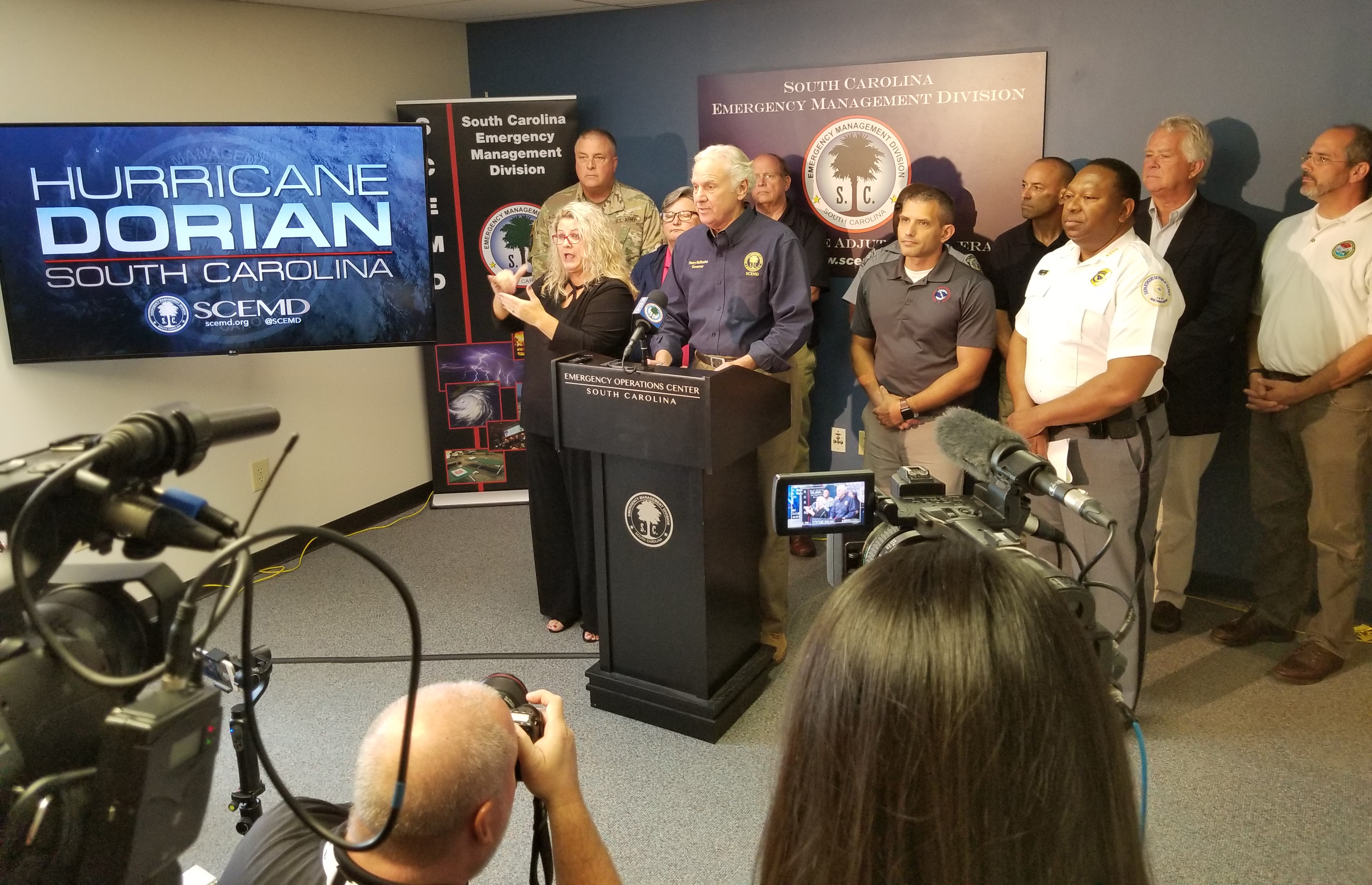
The Emergency Operations Center of South Carolina holds a briefing on the hurricane.

Charleston city officials reserved temporary pumps to position in any low-lying areas. Charleston's Stormwater Department began lowering the water levels in lakes. South Carolina officials eased restrictions on the importation of animals into the state to accommodate evacuees. On August 31, Governor Henry McMaster declared a state of emergency for the entire state. The South Carolina Emergency Response Team (SCERT) was put at Operational Condition Level 2, signaling an emergency is likely. On September 1, McMaster ordered evacuations for the coastal sections of eight counties: Colleton, Beaufort, Jasper, Charleston, Dorchester, Berkeley, Horry, and Georgetown, affecting around 830,000 people. Schools and state government offices closed in those counties. Multiple South Carolina highways saw their lanes reversed, including Interstate 26, which had cars driving westbound on eastbound lanes, and US Route 278.

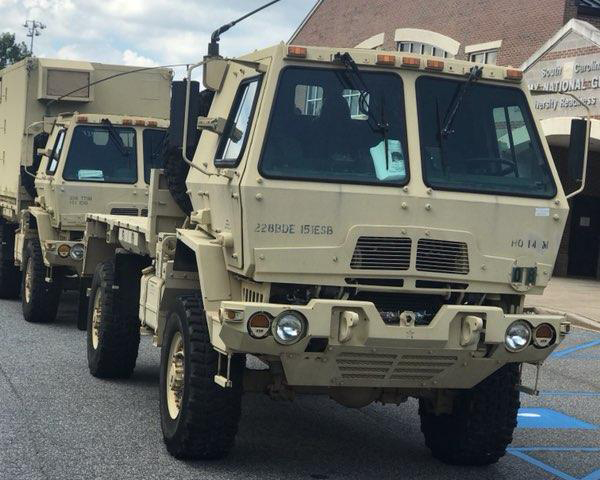
Trucks associated with the South Carolina National Guard prepare to respond to emergencies during Hurricane Dorian.

Road reversals started early because of the expectation of heavy Labor Day holiday weekend traffic; hotels in the area were at 70% capacity. About 200 coastal hospitals, nursing homes, and assisted living centers were evacuated. On September 1, McMaster asked President Trump for a federal emergency declaration. The state readied 1,000 National Guard troops, 2,200 transportation employees, and 700 state law enforcement officers. State emergency officials had 150,000 sandbags, 10,000 tarps, 500 pallets of ready-to-eat meals, and 750 pallets of water ready. Dozens of volunteers handed out fruit, vegetables, water, and canned food to over 300 people in Charleston. The Myrtle Beach Fire Department implemented double red flag status, preventing people from swimming at local beaches. In Orangeburg, 75 buses stationed along Interstate 26 assisted evacuations. Also, the New Jersey Task Force 1 was sent to help with evacuations over the entire state. The South Carolina Emergency Management Division moved to Operation Condition 1 (OPCON1), suggesting that the state was on full alert. Hospitals exempt from the evacuation still discharged patients who were ready to go home while also postponing elective surgeries. Despite the mandatory evacuations, one of these prisons located in the lowcountry, Ridgeland Correctional Institution decided not to evacuate, citing their updated hurricane standards after Hurricane Hugo struck the area in 1989.

A limited evacuation order was put in place for Joint Base Charleston, and a mandatory evacuation was put in place for Marine Corps Recruit Depot Parris Island and Marine Corps Air Station Beaufort. Beaufort County enforced a curfew from 10:00 p.m. EDT on September 4, 2019, to 6:00 a.m. EDT on September 5, 2019. Sandbags were distributed and parking garages were opened throughout multiple cities. Folly Beach restricted access to the island on the afternoon of September 3. Goats on Goat Island were also evacuated. The Myrtle Beach International Airport canceled flights on September 4 and September 5. Congaree National Park also closed at noon on September 4 due to the approaching hurricane. Hundreds of shelter animals from the coastal Carolinas were sent to Delaware ahead of the storm. Another 200 animals were airlifted by the Brandywine Valley SPCA on September 3, and around 150 were expected to be airlifted later during the day via the Best Friends Animal Society. On Hilton Head Island, the town director of public projects and facilities reported that officials were ready to bring in contractors to survey the beach if erosion occurred. Hilton Head Fire Rescue closed three stations on the island and relocated to University of South Carolina Beaufort; however, the fire rescue left another four open.

=== North Carolina ===
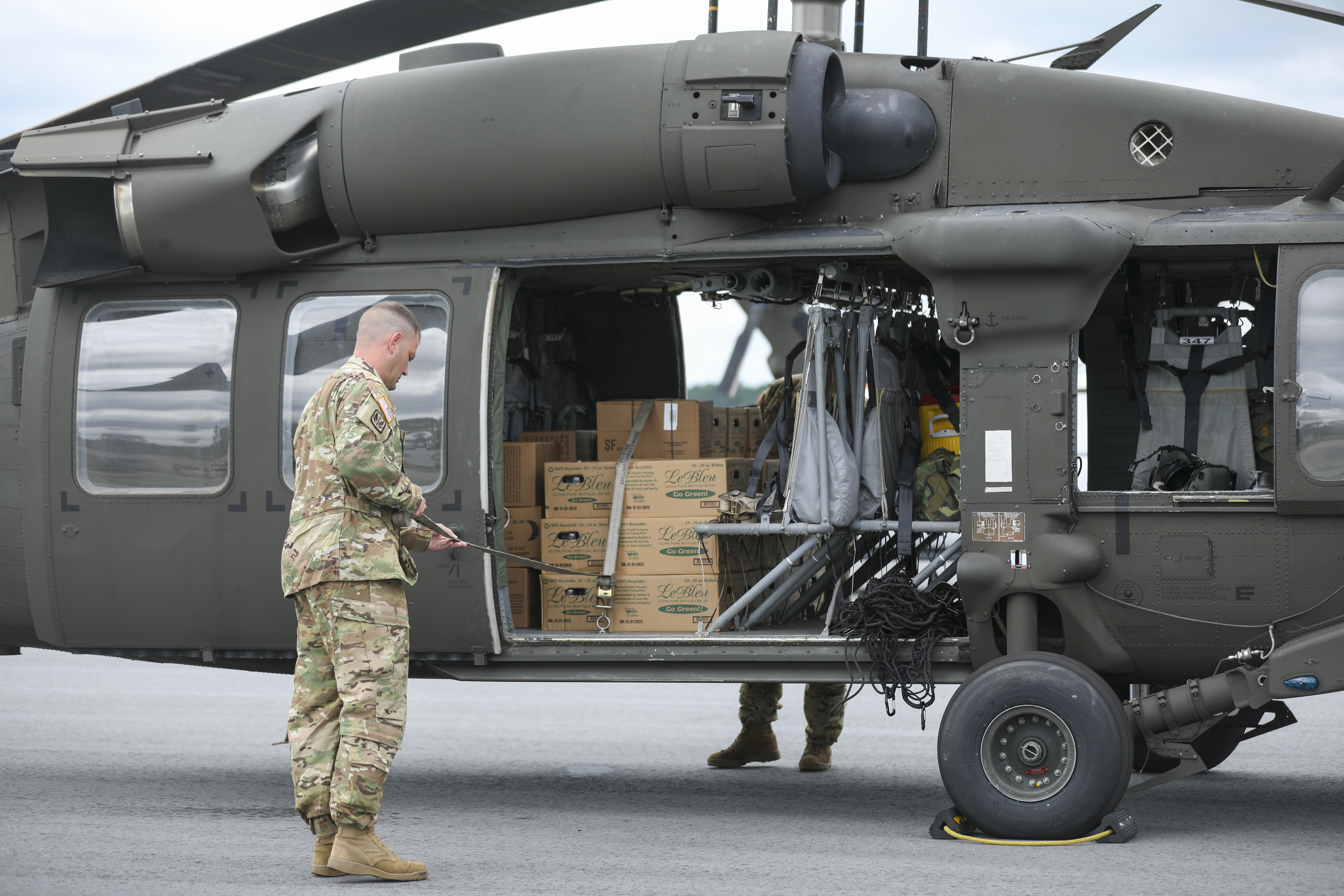
The North Carolina National Guard loading supplies on a helicopter in advance of Hurricane Dorian

In advance of Dorian, the National Weather Service warned against dangerous rip currents along the shoreline. On August 30, Governor Roy Cooper declared a state of emergency for all of North Carolina. He later requested a federal disaster declaration, which was promptly approved. The governor's office activated the North Carolina Disaster Relief fund to accept donations that would assist the statewide response. Governor Cooper's emergency declaration was matched with more than two dozen state of emergencies at the county level. In advance of the storm, nearly 400,000 residents were put under mandatory evacuations, as they were issued across Dare County, the Outer Banks communities of Corolla and Carova, Carolina Beach, Kure Beach, Wrightsville Beach, Figure Eight Island, and all barrier islands offshore. Officials in Hyde County airlifted residents to shelter. Several people were charged with class two misdemeanors after failing to comply with the evacuation orders in Wrightsville Beach. Less restrictive voluntary evacuations were laid in place for the low-lying areas of Oak Island and the rest of New Hanover County, in addition to the communities of Beaufort, Atlantic Beach, Cape Carteret, and Boiling Springs Lake. Duke University would subsequently evacuate their Marine Lab students from Beaufort, while the bridge to Wrightsville Beach would later close on September 4. In Morehead City, boat owners docked their boats. On Bald Head Island, all day visitors were ordered to leave. On Ocracoke Island, only homeowners and vendors with re-entry passes were allowed on inbound ferries. Priority boarding for ferries leaving the island was suspended, and tolls were waived. The approach of Dorian marked the end of passenger ferry service for the 2019 season there. The National Park Service closed visitor centers and museums throughout the southern Outer Banks while Cape Lookout National Seashore was closed as well. A total of 900 people and 496 vehicles were evacuated off Ocracoke Island. An emergency ferry route was prepared in the case North Carolina Highway 12 was closed.

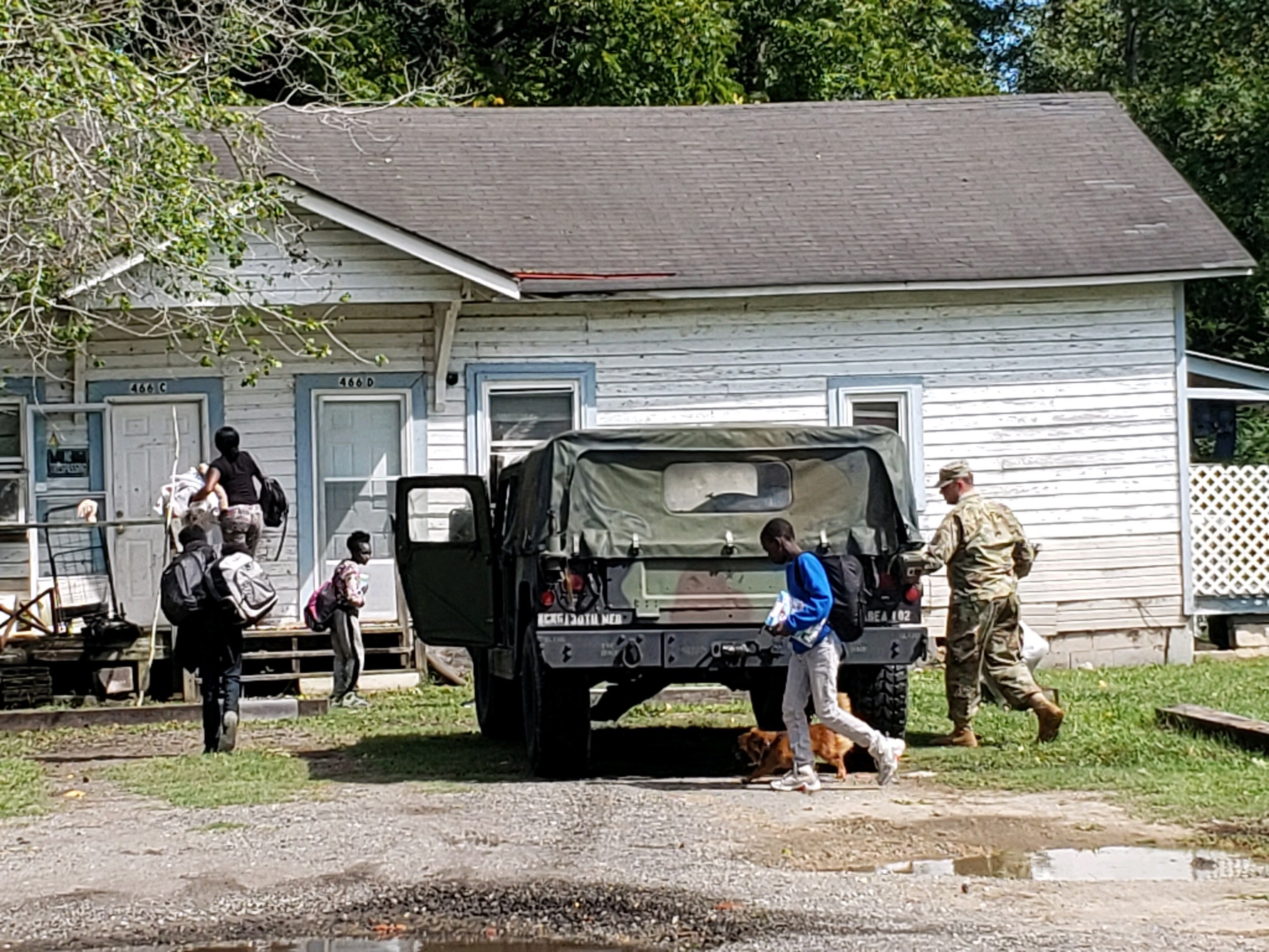
Members of the North Carolina National Guard evacuating residents before the storm

The North Carolina Department of Transportation suspended construction along evacuation routes, and readied 2,415 employees to respond to disruptions in transportation. The organization assisted in ferry evacuations while also preparing flight teams and drones to survey damage. Fearing a repeat of Hurricane Florence, which wrought unprecedented flooding throughout the Carolinas a year earlier, high water vehicles were staged along Interstate 40. Across the state, 521 National Guard members, 181 high water vehicles, 23 swift water rescue teams, 48 high water vehicle teams, and 19 aircraft were deployed. The University of North Carolina at Wilmington joined dozens of school districts to cancel classes. Downtown, the city opened two parking decks for residents to relocate their vehicles during the storm, and the annual Wilmington Boat Show was cancelled. Ports in both Wilmington and Morehead City were closed. A two-unit Brunswick nuclear power plant was shut down near the city. On September 4, commercial flights at the Wilmington International Airport were grounded. At the Fayetteville Regional Airport, American Airlines cancelled all flights, Delta Air Lines cancelled a single flight, and the United Service Organization center was closed. At the upstate Charlotte Douglas International Airport, 121 flights were cancelled and an additional 87 were delayed. American Airlines capped its prices and suspended baggage and pet fees. To accommodate fleeing residents and alleviate concerns about local havens overflowing, two so-called "mega-shelters" were opened in Durham and Clayton. The Charlotte Motor Speedway was also utilized as a shelter, where 69 campsites occupied about 150 people mainly from Wilmington. Statewide, about 65 shelters housed 2,200 evacuees. The USDA Forest Service waived fees for campgrounds in the Nantahala and Pisgah national forests, while local animal sanctuaries throughout The Triangle took in dogs, cats, horses, and livestock. Approximately 9,000 Duke Energy personnel were readied throughout the Carolinas, accompanied by 85 employees from Ameren, Missouri. More than 2,700 active-duty service members staged supplies at Fort Bragg, where manning was reduced, as well as at Maxwell Air Force Base in Alabama. Across five bases in North Carolina, 820 personnel, 26 ships, and 110 aircraft were evacuated. Forty-two firefighters from the Greensboro Fire Department were deployed to the coast. Numerous cities and counties enacted curfews upon the storm's approach. Early voting in North Carolina's 9th congressional district was disrupted as the Bladen County Board of Elections closed. Voting was also impacted in the 3rd congressional district. Ultimately, early voting hours were extended in every county of the 3rd congressional district for the special election in that district, and four counties in the 9th congressional district for that district's special election. The date to submit absentee ballots was prolonged. One polling place in Tyrrell County was relocated, as the original polling station was utilized as a command post for emergency relief efforts. While preparing for the storm, an 85-year-old man in neighboring Columbus County fell from a ladder and died. A second man died in Oriental after suffering a heart attack while moving his boat at a marina.

== Impact ==
=== South Carolina ===
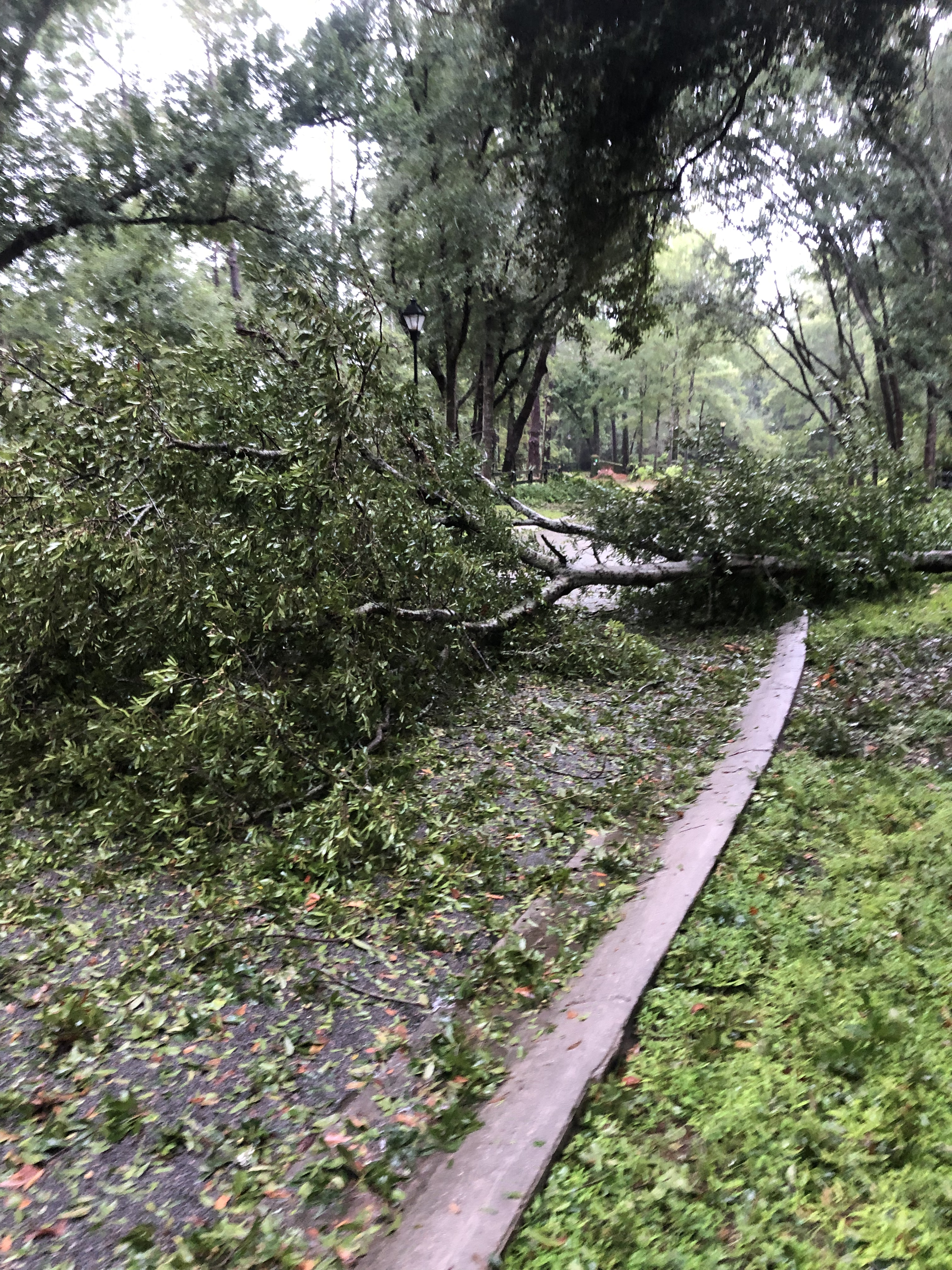
A fallen tree in Spanish Wells on September 5

On August 28, NWS Charleston expected moderate to major levels of tidal flooding, even if Dorian remained away from Charleston. NWS Charleston also expected the rainfall-induced freshwater flooding threat to increase in the next week.

The highest wind gust associated with Dorian near South Carolina was on Buoy 41004, off the coast of the state, with a wind gust measured at 98 mph (158 km/h). The highest wind gusts recorded onshore were 92 mph (148 km/h) on Dewees Island, while the highest recorded winds on mainland South Carolina were 92 mph (148 km/h) measured on Fripp Island. Market Street in Charleston was submerged in 1 ft (0.30 m) of water, and the Charleston airport recorded about 5 in (130 mm) of rainfall. In Mount Pleasant, two people were killed after a possible lightning strike started a house fire. On September 6, 81 homes in North Charleston sustained damage, with 25 receiving major damage, 24 receiving minor damage, and two being rendered inaccessible. A tree fell on a boy's bedroom in North Charleston, almost completely decimating it. A nearby tree fell on a power line in North Charleston, taking out power to half of a woman's house. A tornado also dropped down in North Myrtle Beach, damaging nine condominiums. Also in North Myrtle Beach, around 4 ft (1.2 m) of storm surge flowed on Ocean Boulevard. Water could be seen rushing outside of the Medical University of South Carolina. About 215 road closures were reported across the state. Most road closures were due to flooding or fallen trees, including more than 13 road closures in Charleston County, where 10 of which were due to flooding, and another 13 in Dorchester County, where 10 were due to fallen trees. At least 248,000 customers of Dominion Energy lost power in the state. Over 500 trees were downed in the Charleston metropolitan area alone. A dozen boats broke their moorings and sank in the Charleston area. Severe beach erosion occurred on the Isle of Palms. Overall, more than 270,000 customers were without power in South Carolina. A peak rainfall of 15.21 in (386 mm) was recorded near Pawleys Island. A study by the College of Charleston completed on September 11 suggested that Dorian caused an estimated $58.6 million in losses to the tourism industry in Charleston. According to the POA in one neighborhood called Hilton Head Plantation on Hilton Head Island, six homes had roof damage and 50 trees were obstructing roadways.

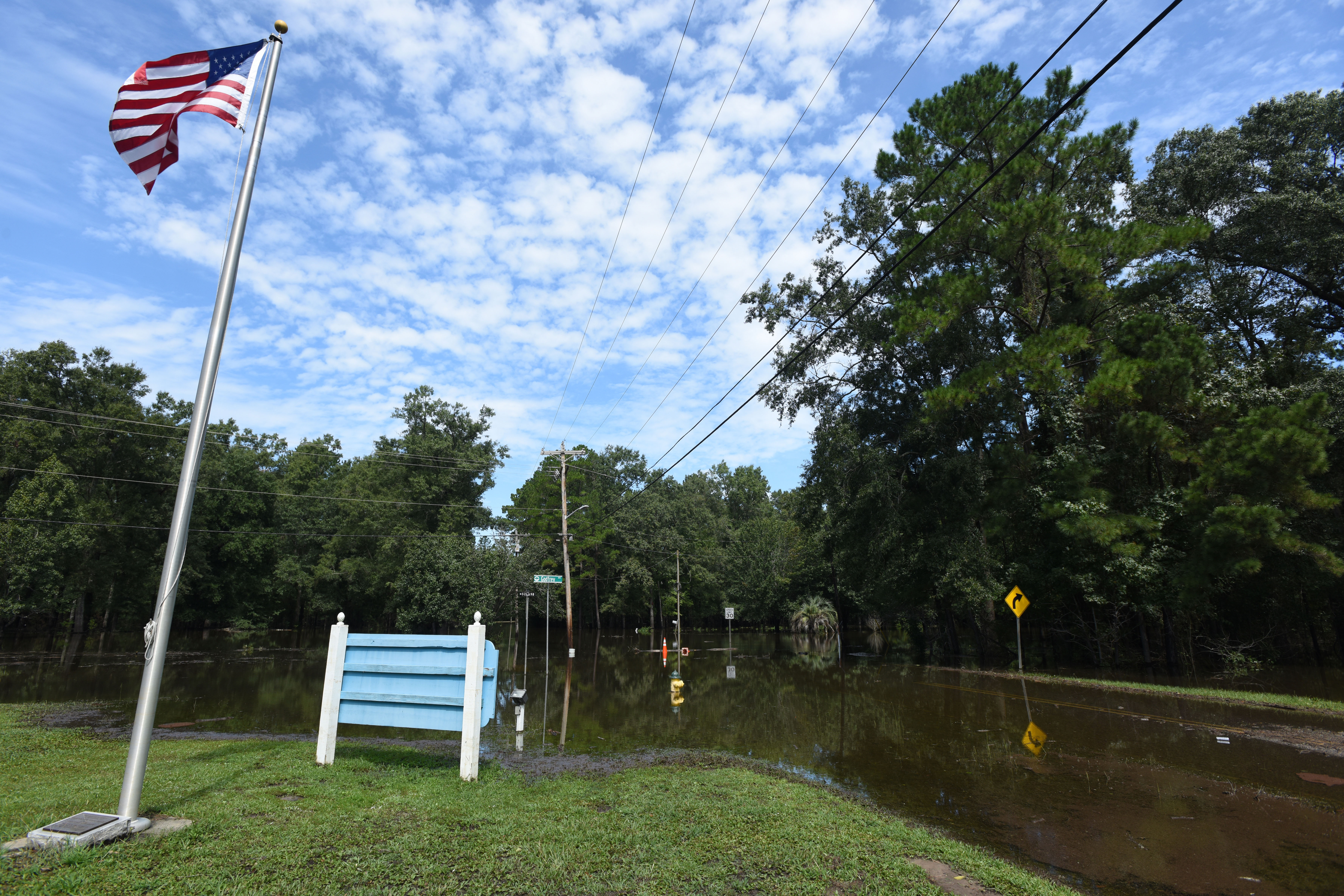
Flooding in Conway after Hurricane Dorian

A section of U.S. Route 17 was flooded; however, the route was not shut down. A tree split in half on Marion Square and fell onto Calhoun Street; however, the mess was soon cleaned up. Water in Charleston was reportedly "knee-high" in some streets. Three tornadoes were spawned in Horry County during the storm, with the most intense tornado being ranked an EF1 on the Enhanced Fujita scale. The most intense tornado caused roof damage to homes, lifted up docks, and uprooted trees, after traveling over 4.8 mi (7.7 km), causing over $200,000 in property damage. Along with this tornado, two EF0s were reported. One of them caused damage to a condominium and partially uprooted close to twelve dozen trees. The other EF0 tornado severely damaged two mobile homes, and left seven others with minor damage, while later bringing roof and facade damage to a condominium. The Waccamaw River in Conway crested at 14 ft (4.3 m), around 7 ft (2.1 m) lower than its record of 21 ft (6.4 m) during Hurricane Florence. At Drayton Hall, Dorian uprooted 30 trees, causing the property around $100,000 in damage. A part of a church's roof on James Island was ripped off during the storm. In DeBordieu, storm surge rushed through one neighborhood in the town. A family of six on Saint Helena Island said that they had lost their house and enclosures for over 200 animals. They had also said "It sounded like a freight train coming through the house". On South Island, 42 nests were destroyed, or around 7 percent of the total number of eggs laid on the island. On Sandy Island, 38 nests were destroyed, or around one-third of the total laid eggs.

=== North Carolina ===
The effects of Hurricane Dorian were extensive in North Carolina, but not as severe as 2018's Hurricane Florence. On September 4, the Storm Prediction Center (SPC) issued a Slight risk of severe weather for coastal sections of South Carolina, noting that tornadoes would be possible within arcing rainbands, or the outer parts of a hurricane, propagating away from Dorian's center. A Slight risk was likewise issued for coastal North Carolina on September 5. As a maritime warm front progressed northward into the coastal counties of North Carolina during the pre-dawn hours, rising temperatures and dew points contributed to an unstable atmosphere. An already-volatile wind shear environment was noted throughout the region, and the combination of these factors gave way to multiple training supercells—storms that tracked over the same areas repeatedly. The SPC accordingly raised an Enhanced risk later that morning, with an attendant 15% probability of a tornado within 25 miles (40 km) across eastern North Carolina. During the event, 22 tornadoes were confirmed across coastal sections of North Carolina, most short-lived and weak. However, two longer-lived tornadoes of EF2 intensity were confirmed in Sunset Beach and Emerald Isle, causing severe damage to multiple structures, inflicting at least $2 million in property damage.

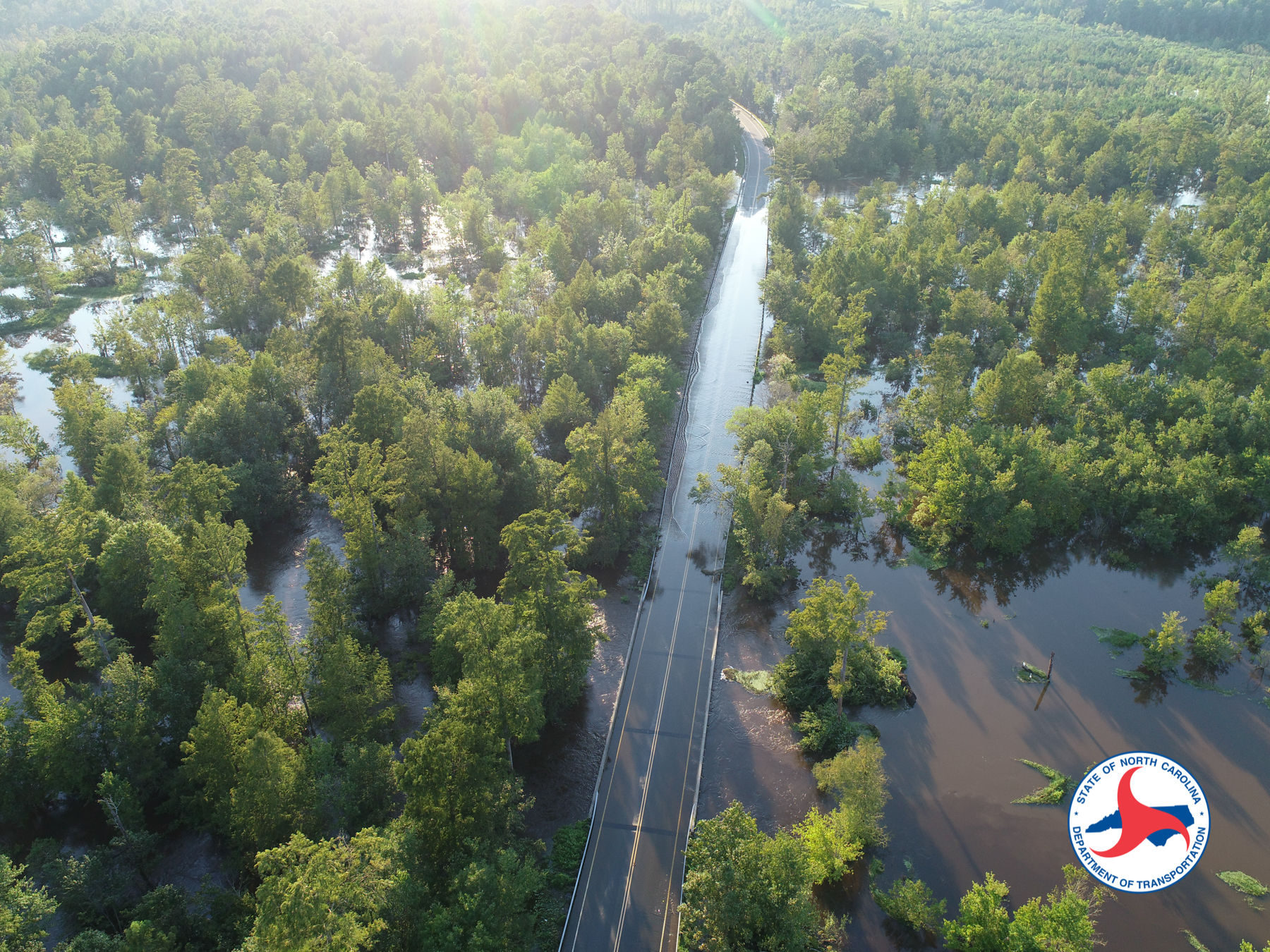
Flooded roads in Sampson County

In Brunswick County, heavy rainfall led to flash flooding that inundated neighborhoods near Leland. Small creeks flooded areas near Varnamtown and closed roads. U.S. Route 17 near Ocean Isle Beach was closed due to overflow throughout the morning hours of September 6. In Oak Island, 86 properties sustained damage, though only 3 of those were substantially impacted. In New Hanover County, sand dunes reconstructed after Hurricane Florence protected Carolina Beach from significant impacts, with only minor beach erosion noted. Similar effects were observed in Wrightsville Beach. At the Fort Fisher State Recreation Area, high waves from the hurricane destroyed thirteen sea turtle nests. High water covered Route 117 in Castle Hayne with 2 ft (0.61 m) of water, with lesser values elsewhere. Several neighborhood streets in Wilmington were inundated, and the downtown area was flooded as portions of the Cape Fear River overflowed its banks. After a lull in heavy rainfall, a second bout of precipitation late on September 5 forced the closure of roadways throughout Castle Hayne, Wrightsboro, Wilmington, and Ogden. Only a few trees were toppled in this area; however, a 54-year-old man was killed while cutting a fallen tree on September 7. Effects were minimal in neighboring Pender County, where some county roads were closed due to flooding, but water receded quickly. Despite initial reports that Topsail Island gained sand during the hurricane, later assessments showed mild but consistent sand loss at local beaches. Farther inland, flash flooding resulted in the closure of several roads throughout Washington, Wilson, Johnston, Sampson, and Craven counties; some roads throughout these communities were washed out. Across Sampson County in particular, 15 roads were closed and a section of road was washed out near Clinton. Multiple stretches of Interstate 40 were inundated near the Sampson–Duplin County line north of Turkey. In Robeson County, a firefighter was injured when a tree fell on his vehicle. Two minor injuries were also reported in Johnston County when a vehicle struck a fallen tree. Wind damage was primarily limited to trees and tree limbs, which caused scattered power outages upon falling onto power lines. At the height of the power outages, about 5,000 people lost electricity in Johnston County, and an additional 2,445 people lost electricity in Wake County. Outages were even less prevalent across western sections of The Triangle, with 48 outages reported in Orange County and 26 in Durham County.

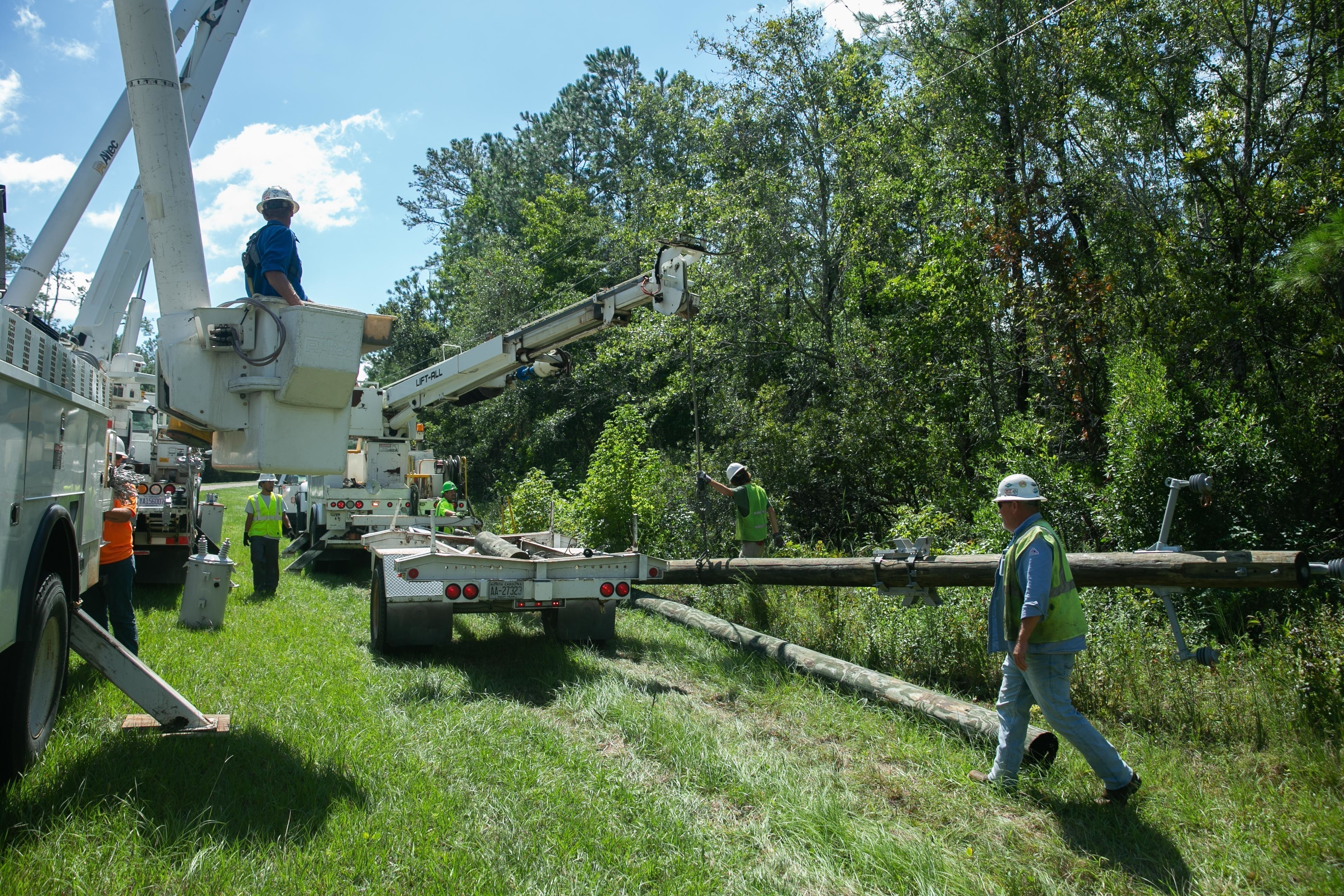
Damaged power lines being repaired in Camp Lejeune

After narrow misses in coastal South Carolina and southeastern North Carolina, Hurricane Dorian continued toward the Outer Banks. The core scraped Atlantic Beach, where a small number of buildings suffered minor structural damage to their roofs, siding, or associated signs. Some areas in town were inundated by little more than 3 in (76 mm) of water. In nearby Beaufort, the Duke Marine Lab reported lost shingles, trees down, and a few areas of rainwater intrusion in several buildings. A peak wind gust of 110 mph (180 km/h) was measured at the Cedar Island Ferry Terminal in Cape Lookout. On Cedar Island, storm surge values of 4–6 ft (1.2–1.8 m) and rainfall rates up to 2 in (51 mm) an hour were recorded. The native horse population, typically accustomed to tropical cyclone impacts, succumbed to the rapid rise in water. At least 28 horses were presumed dead as the bodies of some washed ashore and others went missing. Throughout Carteret County, 42,000 people were left without power. Portsmouth reported major damage to 38 historic structures, as well as a cemetery that hosted some of the earliest settlers of the Outer Banks. The eye of Dorian continued northeast to a landfall on Cape Hatteras at 12:35 UTC on September 6. The hurricane pushed water from the Pamlico Sound onto Ocracoke Island, where storm surge values climbed to 6–7 ft (1.8–2.1 m). In just 10 minutes, water levels rose 5 ft (1.5 m), causing extensive damage to homes and businesses. Several hundred residents were stranded and resorted to climbing to their attics to avoid the rapidly-rising waters. Hundreds of vehicles were submerged there. On neighboring Hatteras Island, a 5.32 ft (1.62 m) surge, the second highest on record, inundated many homes and businesses between Buxton and Hatteras Village in several feet of water as wind gusts up to 101 mph (163 km/h) pushed water inland from the Pamlico Sound. The Cape Hatteras Secondary School was badly flooded and suffered damage to over a third of the structure.

Throughout Hyde and Dare counties, heavy rainfall prompted the issuance of flash flood emergencies. In the former county, flooding closed multiple roads. Extensive impacts were recorded throughout Dare County, with 1,126 structures damaged, resulting in property damage of approximately $14.75 million. Additional damage was inflicted on cars, boats, campers, and recreational vehicles, which were not a part of the assessed damage total. Trees were toppled and shingles were ripped off at both the Fort Raleigh National Historic Site and the Wright Brothers National Memorial. Strong east-northeasterly winds pushed water from the Atlantic Ocean into the Albemarle Sound, causing moderate flooding across Camden, Pasquotank, and Perquimans Counties, while also stranding vehicles. Flash flooding at Elizabeth City State University inundated campus streets and the interior entrances of several buildings. Water flowed into the Chowan River in Chowan County, with the gauge in Edenton reaching a maximum height of 3.85 ft (1.17 m). In extreme northeastern North Carolina, anomalous tides of 2.5–3.5 ft (0.76–1.07 m) caused moderate to major coastal flooding across Currituck County. Duck recorded water levels 7.2 ft (2.2 m) above average low tide levels. Access to the Outer Banks via Highway 168 was severed at high tide. A newly built solar farm was damaged in Grandy. In Kill Devil Hills, many homes and businesses were left without pieces of roofing. A quarter of the Avalon Pier was swept away.

== Aftermath ==
=== South Carolina ===
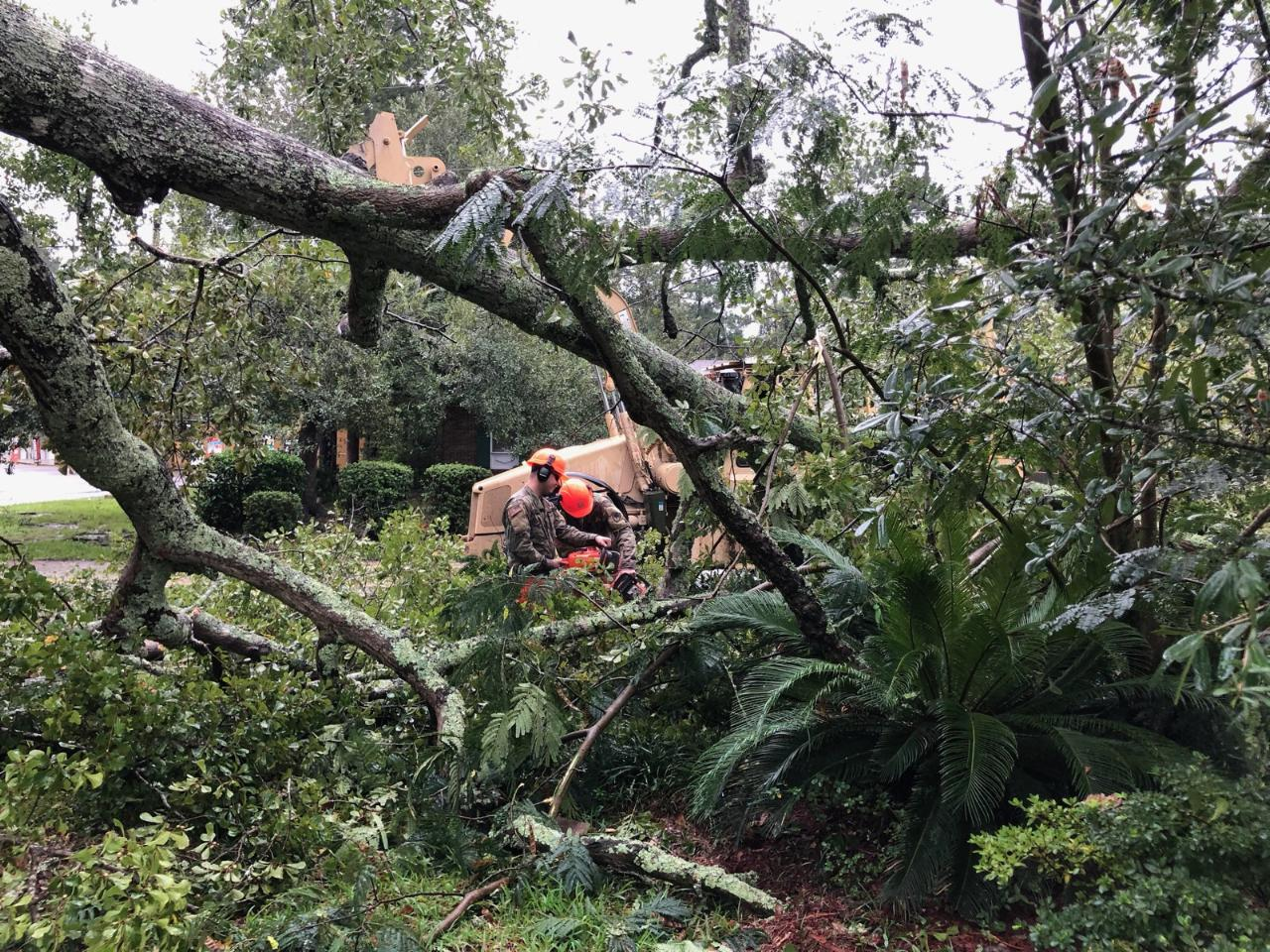
The National Guard working to clear a tree in Moncks Corner, South Carolina.

In Myrtle Beach, a red jeep was found washed up in the sand on September 5, which became widely circulated on social media. On September 9, several Civil War-era cannonballs were discovered by a couple in Folly Beach. People were forced to distance themselves from the cannonballs while bomb experts hauled them away. On September 30, U.S. President Donald Trump approved a major disaster declaration for South Carolina as requested by Governor Henry McMaster on September 1. Trump also ordered the federal assistance to support emergency work, and to help replace the facilities that were damaged by the hurricane in Beaufort, Berkeley, Charleston, Colleton, Dillon, Dorchester, Georgetown, Horry, Jasper, Marion, and Williamsburg counties, covering damage costs from August 31—September 6. The Governor also planned to invest in $10 million (2019 USD) in the Medical District of Charleston to help fix the problem of flooding in the city. Under the FEMA Public Assistance Program, any state agencies, affected local governments, and a few private non-profit programs were able to apply for federal funding to pay around 75 percent of damages from the storm, including removing debris and repairing roads. Tourist rates dropped down across the state, forcing Hilton Head Island to request $175,000 (2019 USD) for a post-hurricane marketing plan. Hotel occupancy rates also went down, including The Mariott Hilton Head Resort & Spa, which has 513 rooms, to only have eight occupied. Another hotel, The Sonesta Resort, only had around 20 to 30 percent of the full occupancy rate. The state overall lost around $117 million in total due to losses from visitor spending. On the Hunting Island State Park Island, 44 volunteers from the Friends of Hunting Island organization came to the park, cleaning up the debris left behind. A dumpster pushed into the Little River after Dorian had not been taken out of the place for months, and the owner of the dumpster was not found. A grand opening for a Panera Bread was delayed after water damage. Many sea turtle nests were destroyed during Dorian, with only a couple thousand of turtles estimated to have survived the storm.

A buoy originally from Port Royal Sound in Beaufort County was discovered on the shore of New Smyrna Beach, Florida, around 14 mi (23 km) south of Daytona Beach, Florida, after being displaced. A family visiting Fripp Island was walking along the beach when they discovered a large package. Upon opening it, they found around 44 lb (20 kg) of cocaine inside it, with a value of $600,000 in total. It was suspected that Dorian's storm surge pushed it ashore, though its origin is still unknown. Drayton Hall raised $250,000 for recovery efforts after the storm. Hilton Head Island saw a 133% increase in snake bites after the storm, with the most common snake-biter being a copperhead snake. Dorian may have also contributed in pushing some birds north into Canada from the Southeastern United States, including a pelican named Ralph, which was pushed onto Cape Breton Island. Pawleys Island underwent a beach nourishment project after Dorian brought sand prices down, restoring around 140 ft (43 m) of land. The City of Charleston sued 24 oil and pipeline firms, saying that they had been directly responsible for causing more damaging and frequent floods. John Tecklenburg, the mayor of Charleston, reported that public work crews from Columbia and Greenville were helping to restore traffic signals. The town of Mount Pleasant considered putting more power lines underground after Dorian took out power to thousands in the town. A couple of dozen people showed up at the John McKissick Field at the Summerville High School, after Dorian damaged the state championship board, the goal post, the 25-second clock, and part of a fence in the end zone of the field. In Beaufort County, no schools lost power or water, and thus reopened on September 9, 2019.

Henry McMaster, the Governor of the state, created a 56-person flood commission group to find out why floods in South Carolina became more chronic and damaging, after Dorian brought severe flooding to parts of South Carolina. The South Carolina Department of Transportation after the storm hoped to repair all road signs within two months; however, more vital signs, such as stop signs, were the first priority to fix. Despite some damages in Charleston, most businesses in the city were ready to open up by September 7 or September 8 in the area. Dorian closed the beach at Pawleys Island for months; however, police on the island shared a video of a man removing the beach access barrier to get to the beach at around 6:40 in the evening on March 25, 2020. The storm also "ruffled up the waters", or changed the oxygen level in the ocean waters, which also changed the amount of shrimp that could be caught. This is due to the fact that a certain amount of dissolved oxygen is required for shrimp catching, and storms have repeatedly demonstrated the ability to alter the amount of dissolved oxygen in the water. A meeting took place in Horry County, due to the problem of flooding near South Carolina Highway 90, and also that of rezoning, due to the flooding from previous hurricanes in addition to that caused by Dorian.

=== North Carolina ===
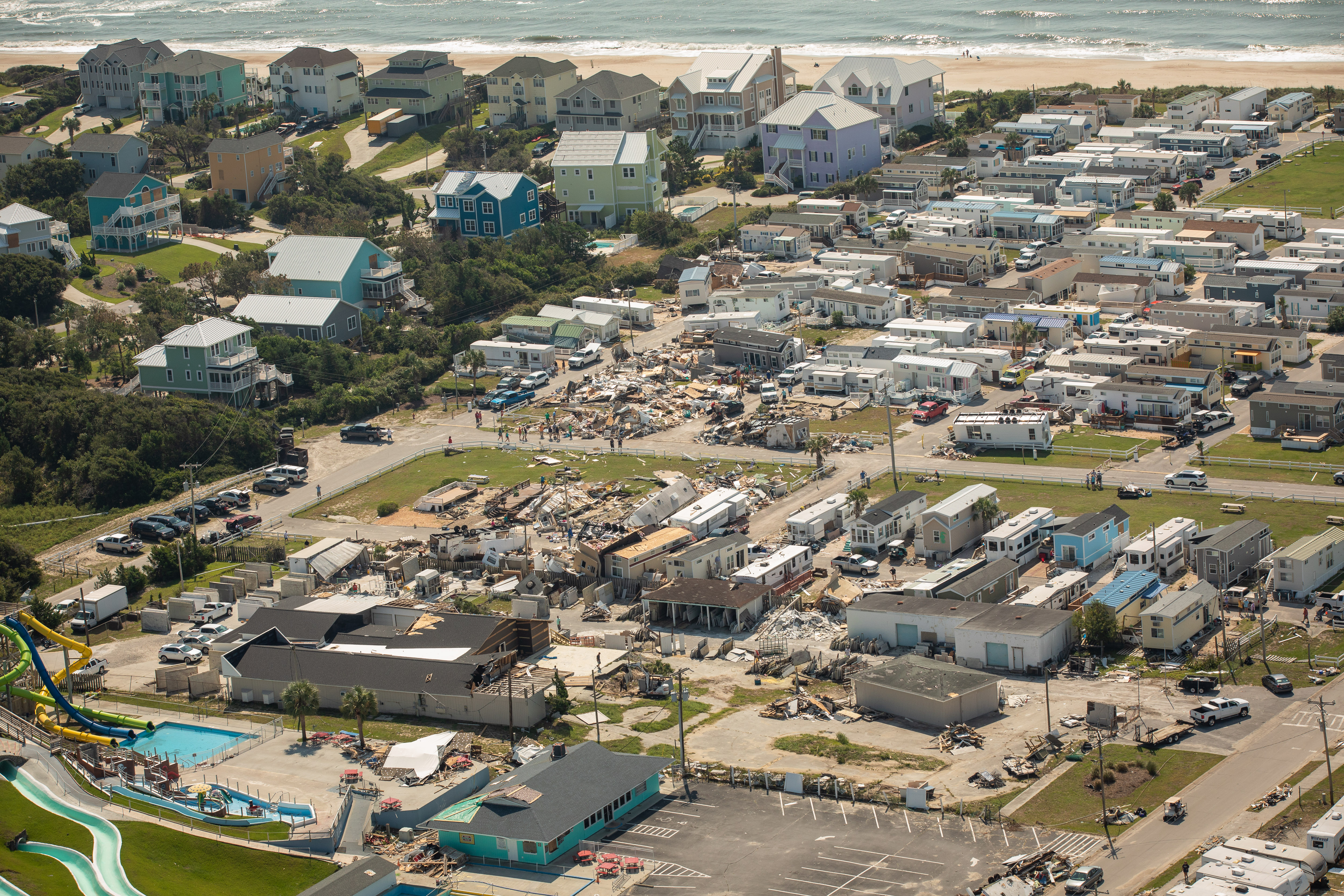
Numerous destroyed buildings along the Outer Banks, as seen from a helicopter

In the wake of the storm, Governor Roy Cooper and State House Speaker Tim Moore toured the damage in the Outer Banks, and also throughout Carteret County. On September 14, the Governor sought a disaster declaration for the state; an additional request for federal assistance was sent one week later. More than 8,000 army and air National Guardsmen were mobilized in response to Hurricane Dorian. National Guard members and emergency officials crossed the Pamlico Sound by ferry, arriving on Ocracoke Island with cargo and fuel trucks, generators, and pallets of supplies beginning on September 7. Statewide, 80 roads were closed throughout North Carolina. Two 500 ft (150 m) sections of Highway 12—the primary highway connecting the islands and peninsulas of the Outer Banks—were badly damaged. The North Carolina Department of Transportation reported that Dorian inflicted $40–50 million in damage to roads, with $25–30 million to primary roads and $16–20 million to secondary roads, including $4–5 million to Highway 12 alone. The organization sought funds from the Federal Emergency Management Agency (FEMA) to pay for the damage, having depleted their resources in the wake of multiple lawsuits and the short succession of hurricanes Matthew and Florence. Duke Energy reported that 288,000 customers had their power restored in the wake of the storm. Coastal assessments found at least 54 new inlets cutting from the Atlantic into the Core Sound throughout the Outer Banks. At least 20–25% of the state's crop industry was destroyed, particularly the tobacco crop. Dorian compounded disastrous losses accrued during hurricanes Matthew and Florence from previous years. The National Park Service Incident Management Team deployed 68 employees to survey the aftermath, reporting structural damage to the Long Point cabin camp, which ultimately decided to cancel reservations for the remainder of the season. By September 9, 1,500 residents remained without power. A medical team, an emergency manager, and 100 National Guard members remained on Ocracoke Island to assist in recovery efforts. For weeks after the storm, island officials decided to limit access to residents, non-resident homeowners, and other personnel approved by Hyde County. On Hatteras Island, access was impossible through September 7, as 39 roadways in coastal communities remained closed. Spirit Airlines lost over $25 million, due to flights being cancelled because of Dorian.

A North Carolina–based Lowe's sent 30 specially-trained employees to the coastline for relief work, and the company donated $1 million to aid in Dorian relief efforts. Animal rescue groups saved 109 injured or orphaned squirrels, after the storm destroyed their nests. Walmart gave $500,000 in donations to the Bahamas, North Carolina, and South Carolina to help those areas recover from Hurricane Dorian.

== See also ==
- List of North Carolina hurricanes (2000–present)
- Tropical cyclones in 2019
- October 2015 North American storm complex
