= Trace and access =

In United Kingdom homeowner's insurance policies, trace and access cover (Note: Usage note: this sense of cover in the UK refers to what US English speakers would call coverage.) refers to insurance cover of the costs to detect and repair the source of a water leak. While most policies will cover the cost to repair water damage caused by a leak, many UK policies specifically or implicitly exclude trace and access cover, leaving the homeowner to foot the bill for finding and repairing the leaking pipe or other source of water incursion into the home. Without trace and access coverage, any damage done to the home to locate the leak (removing wall board or floor boards to access plumbing, etc.) is not covered.

Where trace and access cover is provided, an industry of service providers has arisen and is favoured by insurers as they are able to use advanced techniques to ascertain the source of water incursion while minimizing damage to the home structure. As at 2022, few UK insurances companies cover the cost of the actual repair within their policies. Most policies have generous upper limit in addition as soon as the causation is discovered to be an insurable peril any subsequent damage reverts to the buildings or contents section of the policy, which is almost always much more generous.
