= Tinga Nursery =

Historic plant nursery in North Carolina, United States

- U.S. National Register of Historic Places
- U.S. Historic district
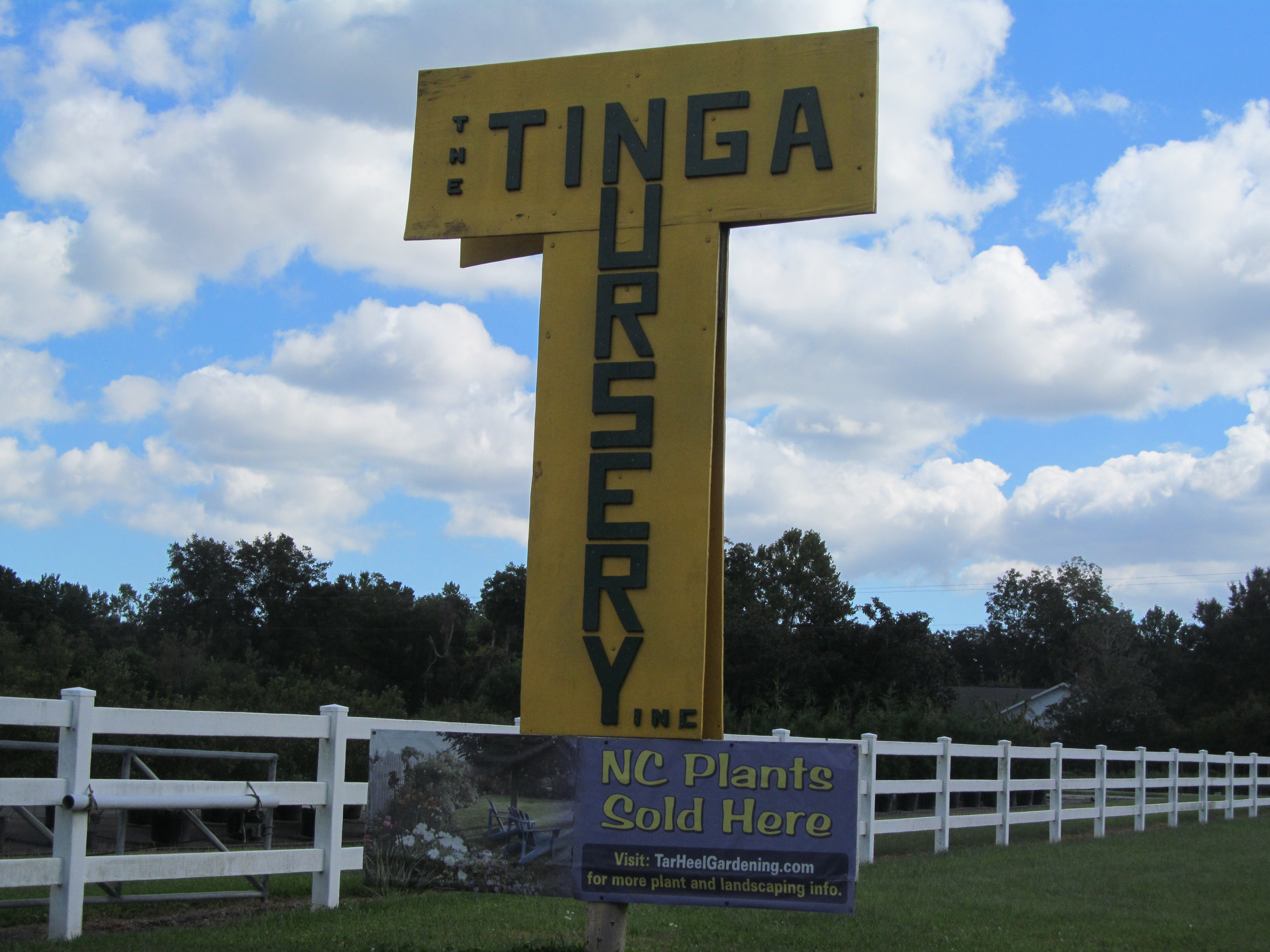
- Tinga Nursery, September 2014

- Location within North Carolina Location within the United States
- Nearest city: US 117, 0.62 miles N of jct. with NC 132, near Wrightsboro, North Carolina
- Coordinates: 34°17′55″N 77°55′04″W
- Area: 30 acres (12 ha)
- Built: 1913
- Architectural style: Bungalow/craftsman
- NRHP reference No.: 00001185
- Added to NRHP: October 4, 2000

Tinga Nursery is a historic plant nursery and national historic district located near Wrightsboro, New Hanover County, North Carolina. It was established in 1906. Contributing resources include the Bungalow / American Craftsman style main house (1918), wash house and wood shed, employee's quarters, big barn, bulb barn and pump house, old office, new office, potting shed, garage, nursery lanes, field patterns, drainage ditches, cold frame, and pond.

It was listed on the National Register of Historic Places in 2000.
