= Water damage =

Intrusion of water causing destruction and attack

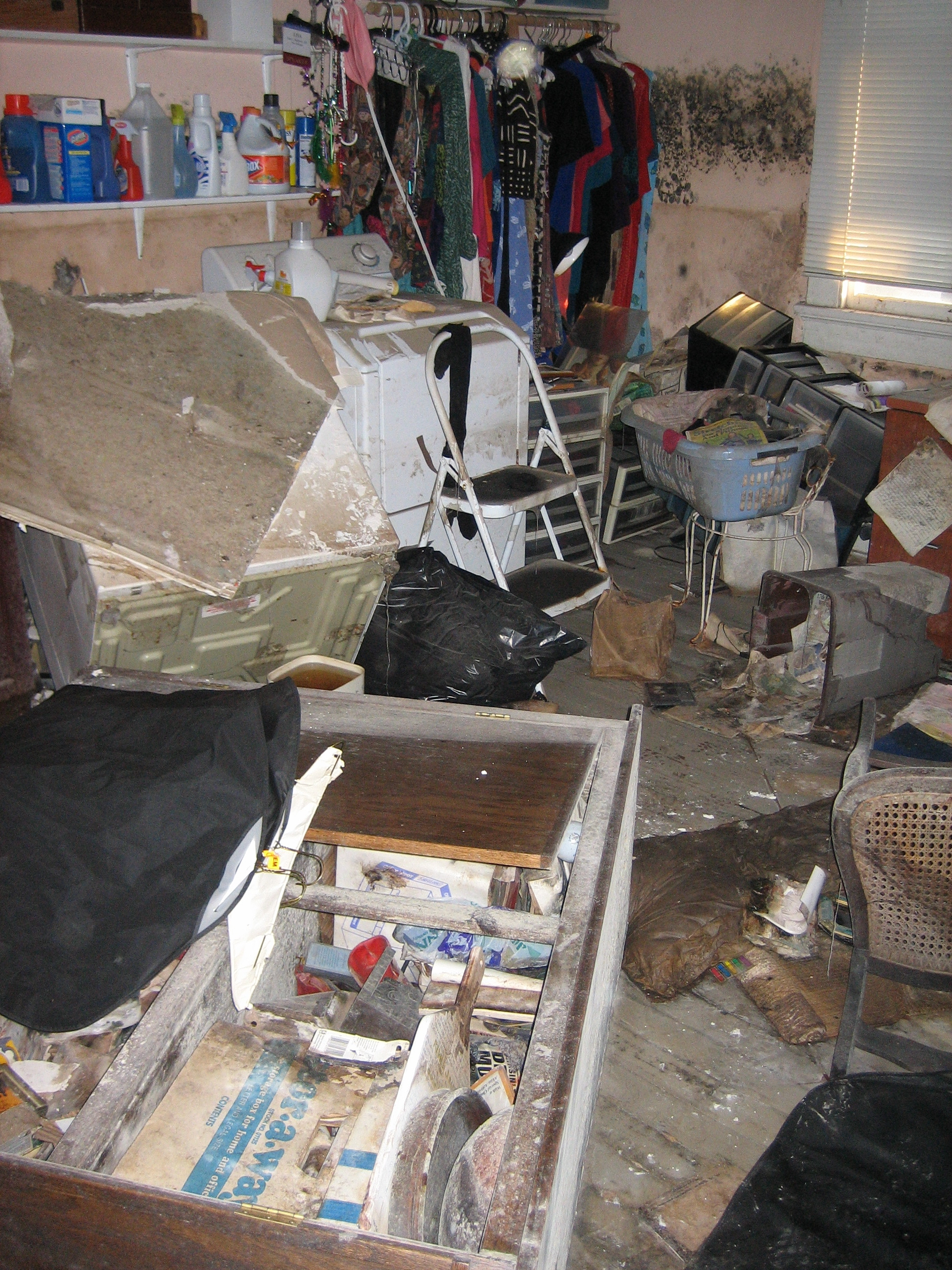
Interior of part of a damaged home in New Orleans after Hurricane Katrina

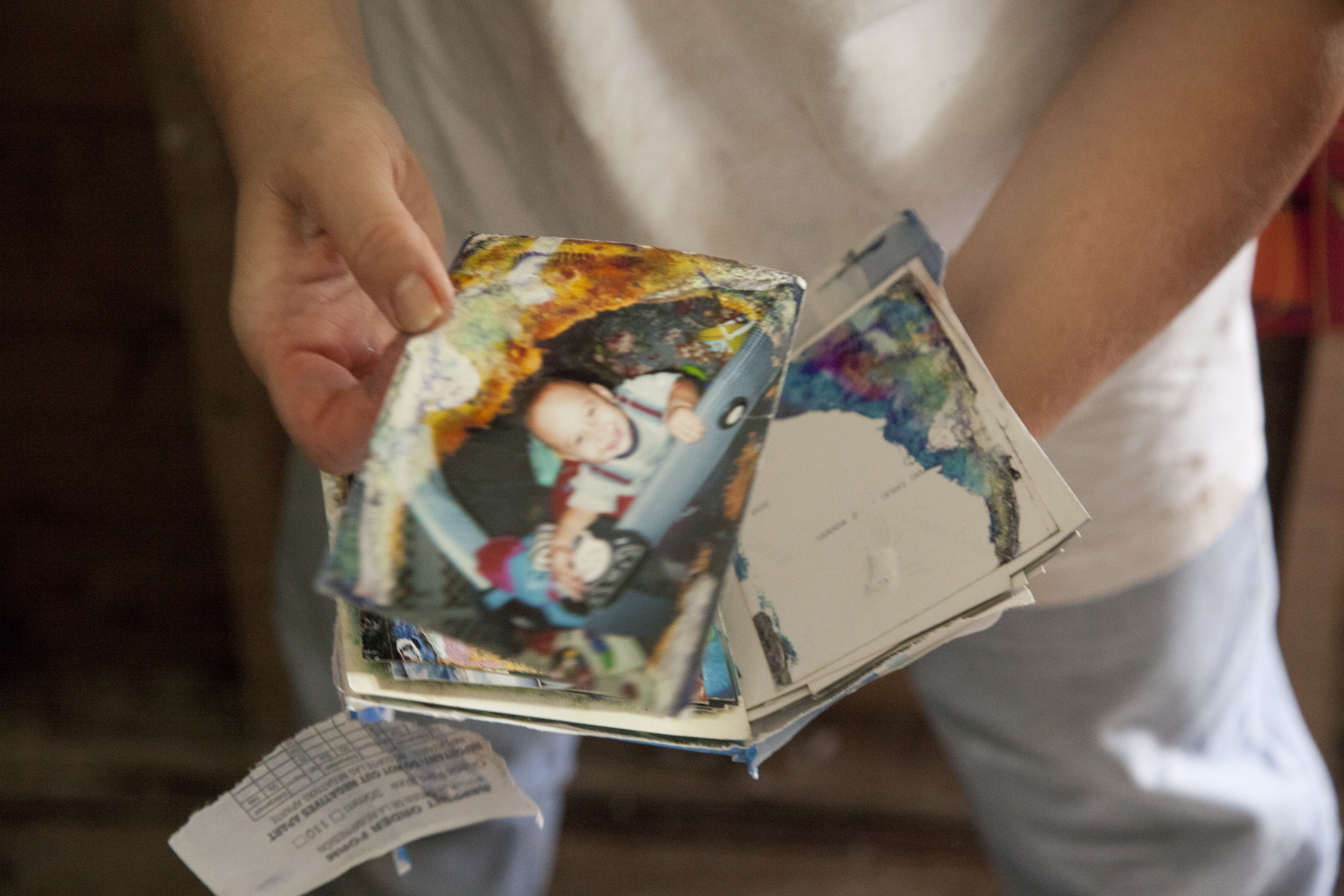
Family photographs damaged by flooding

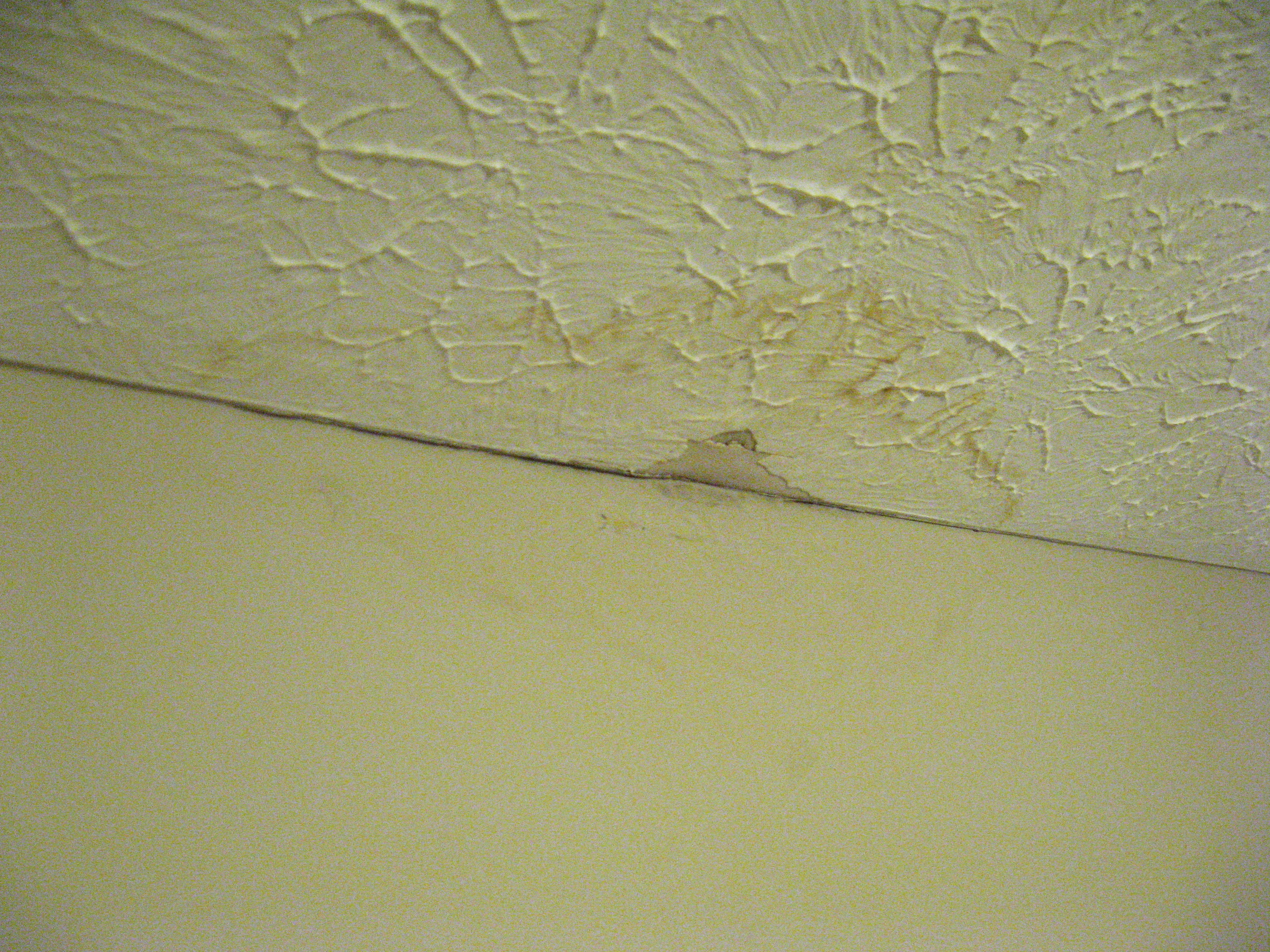
A smaller and more minor water spot caused by rainwater leaking through a roof

Water damage describes various possible losses caused by water intruding where it will enable attack of a material or system by destructive processes such as rotting of wood, mold growth, bacteria growth, rusting of steel, swelling of composite woods, damage to laminated materials like plywood, short-circuiting of electrical devices, etc.

The damage may be very slow and minor such as water spots that could eventually mar a surface, or it may be instantaneous and catastrophic such as burst pipes and flooding. However fast it occurs, water damage is a major contributor to loss of property.

An insurance policy may or may not cover the costs associated with water damage and the process of water damage restoration. While a common cause of residential water damage is often the failure of a sump pump, many homeowner's insurance policies do not cover the associated costs without an addendum which adds to the monthly premium of the policy. Often the verbiage of this addendum is similar to "Sewer and Drain Coverage".

In the United States, those individuals who are affected by wide-scale flooding may have the ability to apply for government and FEMA grants through the Individual Assistance program. On a larger level, businesses, cities, and communities can apply to the FEMA Public Assistance program for funds to assist after a large flood. For example, the city of Fond du Lac Wisconsin received $1.2 million FEMA grant after flooding in June 2008. The program allows the city to purchase the water damaged properties, demolish the structures, and turn the former land into public green space.

== Health Risks: Mold & Indoor Air Quality ==
Excess moisture from water damage creates ideal conditions for mold growth. Mold colonies can begin to form within 24-48 hours of a wetting event, as porous materials (e.g. drywall) provide both food and shelter for spores. Once established, even small mold patches release spores and microbial fragments into the air, which can trigger a range of respiratory issues. The CDC warns that exposure to damp or moldy indoor environments is associated with increased rates of coughing, wheezing, asthma exacerbations, bronchitis, and hypersensitivity pneumonitis. A 2009 WHO review likewise links persistent indoor dampness and mold to higher prevalences of respiratory symptoms, allergic rhinitis, and asthma across all age groups. Vulnerable populations - particularly children, older adults, and immunocompromised individuals, face the greatest risk of severe reactions, including chronic lung infections in the latter group.

== Causes ==
Water damage can originate by different sources such as a broken dishwasher hose, a washing machine overflow, a dishwasher leakage, broken/leaking pipes, flood waters, groundwater seepage, building envelope failures (leaking roof, windows, doors, siding, etc.) and clogged toilets. According to the Environmental Protection Agency, 13.7% of all water used in the home today can be attributed to plumbing leaks. On average that is approximately 10,000 gallons of water per year wasted by leaks for each US home. A tiny, 1/8-inch crack in a pipe can release up to 250 gallons of water a day. According to Claims Magazine in August 2000, broken water pipes ranked second to hurricanes in terms of both the number of homes damaged and the amount of claims (on average $50,000 per insurance claim) costs in the US. Experts suggest that homeowners inspect and replace worn pipe fittings and hose connections to all household appliances that use water at least once a year. This includes washing machines, dishwashers, kitchen sinks, and bathroom lavatories, refrigerator icemakers, water softeners, and humidifiers. A few US companies offer whole-house leak protection systems utilizing flow-based technologies. A number of insurance companies offer policyholders reduced rates for installing a whole-house leak protection system.

As far as insurance coverage is concerned, damage caused by surface water intrusion to the dwelling is considered flood damage and is normally excluded from coverage under traditional homeowners' insurance. Surface water is water that enters the dwelling from the surface of the ground because of inundation or insufficient drainage and causes loss to the dwelling. Coverage for surface water intrusion to the dwelling would usually require a separate flood insurance policy.

== Climate Change and Emerging Trends ==
Global insured losses from floods, storms, and inland water damage reached roughly US $140 billion in 2024, the third-highest annual total on record, with weather-related events accounting for about 97 percent of those losses. Year-over-year claim volumes jumped 15-25 percent in Gulf Coast states, Midwest river corridors, and the Northeast, driven by more intense rainfall and aging infrastructure. In response, insurers are tightening underwriting criteria while offering premium discounts or grants for homes equipped with leak sensors, auto shut-off valves, or reinforced flood barriers. Concurrently, FEMA’s NFIP is modernizing flood maps using forward-looking climate data and revising policy terms to encourage mitigation investments.

== Categories ==
There are three basic categories of water damage, based on the level of contamination.

Category 1 Water - Refers to a source of water that does not pose a substantial threat to humans. Examples are broken water supply lines, tub or sink overflows or appliance malfunctions that involve water supply lines.

Category 2 Water - Refers to a source of water that contains a significant degree of chemical, biological or physical contaminants and causes discomfort or sickness when consumed or even exposed to. This type carries microorganisms and nutrients of micro-organisms. Examples are toilet bowls with urine (no feces), sump pump failures, seepage due to hydrostatic failure and water discharge from dishwashers or washing machines.

Category 3 Water is grossly unsanitary. This water contains unsanitary agents, harmful bacteria and fungi, causing severe discomfort or sickness. This category includes water sources from sewage, seawater, rising water from rivers or streams, storm surge, ground surface water or standing water.

Categories of water damage can deteriorate based on environmental conditions, including time and temperature. (e.g., Category 1 water can deteriorate to Category 2 water)

Class of water damage is determined by the potential rate of evaporation based on the type of materials affected by water. For example, carpet pad that is saturated will have a greater potential evaporation rate due to its porosity that a hard wood floor that is saturated with water.

Determing the class of a water loss will help determine how much drying equipment such as air movers and dehumidifiers are required to efficiently dry the structural components.

Class 1 — (least amount of water absorption and evaporation load): Water intrusion where wet, porous materials (e.g., carpet, gypsum board, fiber-fill insulation, concrete masonry unit (CMU), textiles) represent less than ~5% of the combined floor, wall and ceiling surface area in the space; and where materials described as low evaporation materials or assemblies have absorbed minimal moisture (see definitions for Class 4 and low evaporation assemblies).

Class 2 — (significant amount of water absorption and evaporation load): water intrusion where wet, porous materials (e.g., carpet, gypsum board, fiber-fill insulation, concrete masonry unit (CMU), textiles) represent ~5% to ~40% of the combined floor, wall and ceiling surface area in the space; and where materials described as low evaporation materials or assemblies have absorbed minimal moisture (see definitions for Class 4 and low evaporation assemblies).

Class 3 — (greatest amount of water absorption and evaporation load): water intrusion where wet, porous materials (e.g., carpet, gypsum board, fiber-fill insulation, concrete masonry unit (CMU), textiles) represent more than ~40% of the combined floor, wall and ceiling surface area in the space; and where materials described as low evaporation materials or assemblies have absorbed minimal moisture (see definitions for Class 4 and low evaporation assemblies).

Class 4 — (deeply held or bound water): water intrusion that involves a significant amount of water absorption into low evaporation materials (e.g., plaster, wood, concrete, masonry) or low evaporation assemblies (e.g., multilayer wallboard, multilayer subfloors, gym floors, or other complex, built-up assemblies). Drying may require special methods, longer drying times, or substantial water vapor pressure differentials.

== Prevention and Mitigation ==
Preventing water damage is far more cost-effective than restoration. Key strategies include:

1. Moisture control: Dry wet areas within 24 hours and keep indoor relative humidity below 50 percent to inhibit mold growth.
2. Routine maintenance: Follow a seasonal checklist: clear gutters in spring, inspect roof flashings in summer, winterize sprinklers in fall, and run faucets at a trickle during deep freezes, to prevent common failure points.
3. Smart technology: Install IoT leak sensors under sinks or behind appliances and automatic shut-off valves on main lines to detect and stop leaks before they spread.
4. Climate-resilient landscaping: Grade soil away from foundations and install French drains or gravel trenches in persistently wet zones.

These measures can cut water damage incidents by up to 30 percent in proactive households and may qualify homeowners for insurance premium credits under emerging resilience incentive programs.

== Restoration ==
Water damage restoration can be performed by property management teams, building maintenance personnel, or by the homeowners themselves; however, contacting a certified professional water damage restoration specialist is often regarded as the safest way to restore water damaged property. Certified professional water damage restoration specialists utilize psychrometrics to monitor the drying process.

=== Cost and Insurance Implications ===
Restoration costs vary widely depending on water contamination and the extent of damage. According to Angi’s 2025 data, average cleanup ranges from about US $450-$1,200 for minor (Category 1/Class 1) incidents to $5,000-$16,000+ for severe (Category 3/Class -4) events, with a nationwide average around $3,833 and typical rates of $3-$7.50 per square foot. Costs rise steeply for gray or black water and prolonged exposure, due to additional demolition, antimicrobial treatments, and reconstruction.

Homeowners insurance coverage differs by policy type. A standard HO-3 policy generally covers sudden internal water damage (e.g., burst pipes) but excludes flood losses, which require a separate NFIP or private flood policy. NFIP building and contents coverages carry separate deductibles, often in the $1,000-$1,500 range, and have specific waiting periods before claims can be made. Policyholders with replacement cost coverage receive full new-for-old compensation (minus deductible), whereas actual cash value policies only reimburse depreciated value of damaged items.

When filing a claim, insurers recommend: stop the water source and document damage with photos and moisture readings; report the loss promptly via the insurer’s 24/7 claims line; save all repair and lodging receipts; and use professional drying logs to substantiate remediation work for the adjuster.

=== Standards and regulation ===
While there are currently no government regulations in the United States dictating procedures, The Institute of Inspection Cleaning and Restoration Certification (IICRC) is the industry standards and certifying body. The current IICRC standard is ANSI/IICRC S500-2021. It is the collaborative work of the IICRC, SCRT, IEI, IAQA, and NADCA.

=== License and Certification ===
Water Restoration companies are regulated by the appropriate state's Department of Consumer Affairs - usually the state contractors license board. While there are generally no contractors license classifications for water damage restoration, the work performed during a restoration project is often covered in adjacent license classifications.

When consumers or businesses hire water restoration companies, they should ensure they are a reputable company by checking reviews, verifying any applicable contractors licenses, IICRC certifications, if they are an IICRC Certified Firm, and appropriate business insurance.

=== Procedures ===
1. Assessment and Moisture Mapping: Technicians use moisture meters and infrared imaging to locate hidden water intrusion and record the appropriate Category/Class ratings before remediation begins.
2. Water Extraction: High-capacity pumps and truck-mounted vacuums remove standing water. Clean Category 1 water is discharged to sanitary drains, while gray/black water is contained for proper disposal.
3. Structural Drying: Air movers and dehumidifiers are strategically placed and adjusted daily, creating a controlled drying environment. Class 4 projects (deeply soaked materials) may require tenting to concentrate warm, dry airflow on saturated structural elements.
4. Monitoring and Documentation: Hygrometers and thermal probes gauge moisture levels every 24 hours. Detailed logs and moisture maps are provided to insurers to substantiate drying progress and accelerate claim approvals.
5. Repairs and Reconstruction: Once materials meet the “dry standard,” technicians rebuild affected areas-replacing drywall, flooring, and finishes and perform a final walkthrough with the client, often backed by a limited workmanship warranty.

== See also ==
- Indoor mold
