= Wilmington International Airport =

International airport in Wilmington, North Carolina, United States

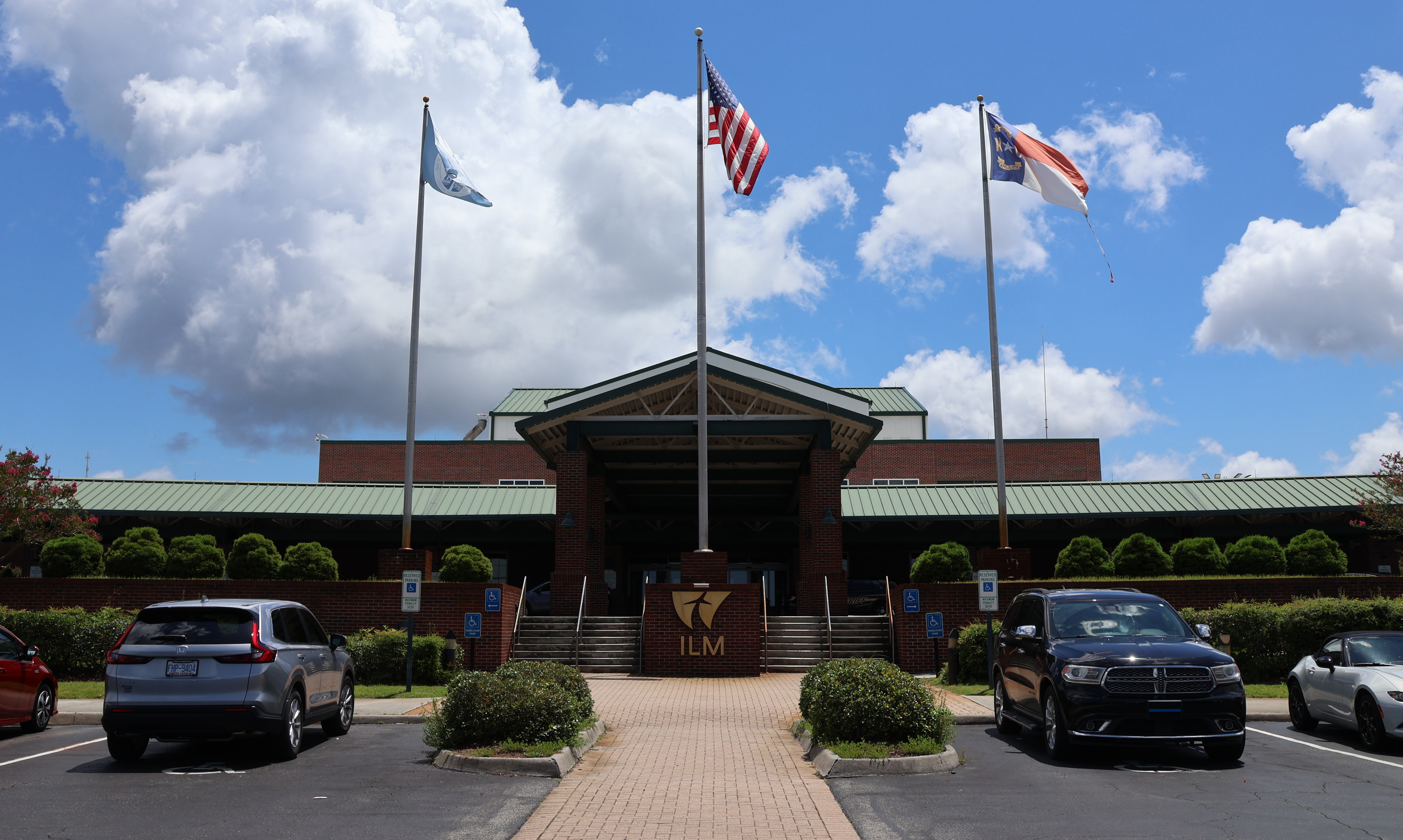
- Old main passenger terminal entrance in July 2023
- IATA: ILM; ICAO: KILM; FAA LID: ILM; WMO: 72301

Summary
- Airport type: Public
- Owner: New Hanover County
- Operator: Wilmington Airport Authority
- Serves: Wilmington, North Carolina
- Location: Wrightsboro, North Carolina
- Elevation AMSL: 32 ft (9.8 m)
- Coordinates: 34°16′14″N 077°54′09″W
- Website: flyilm.com

Maps
- FAA airport diagram
- Interactive map of Wilmington International Airport

Runways
| Direction | Length | | Surface |
| Direction | ft | m | Surface |
|---|---|---|---|
| 6/24 | 8,016 | 2,443 | Asphalt |
| 17/35 | 7,754 | 2,363 | Asphalt |

Statistics (2025)
- Total passengers: 1,826,994 ▲24.64%
- Enplanements: 907,753
- Deplanements: 919,241
- Total cargo (lbs): 3,624,339
- Enplaned cargo: 1,862,732
- Deplaned cargo: 1,761,607
- Source: FAA Wilmington Airport Authority

Wilmington International Airport (IATA: ILM, ICAO: KILM, FAA LID: ILM) is a public airport located just north of Wilmington, North Carolina, in unincorporated Wrightsboro. ILM covers 1,800 acres (728 ha).

During the calendar year of 2025, ILM served a record-high number of passengers, with 907,753 enplanements and 919,241 deplanements, totaling 1,826,994 passengers. The airport has two runways and a passenger terminal which has nine gates. The airport is also home to two fixed-base operators (FBO). There is a 24-hour U.S. Customs and Border Protection ramp, built in 2008, for international flights (private or charter) wishing to land at the airport.

Wilmington International Airport is owned by New Hanover County, which leases the airport to the Wilmington Airport Authority. The current airport director is Jeffrey Bourk, A.A.E. The New Hanover County Airport Authority has seven board members, appointed by the New Hanover County Commissioners.

== History ==
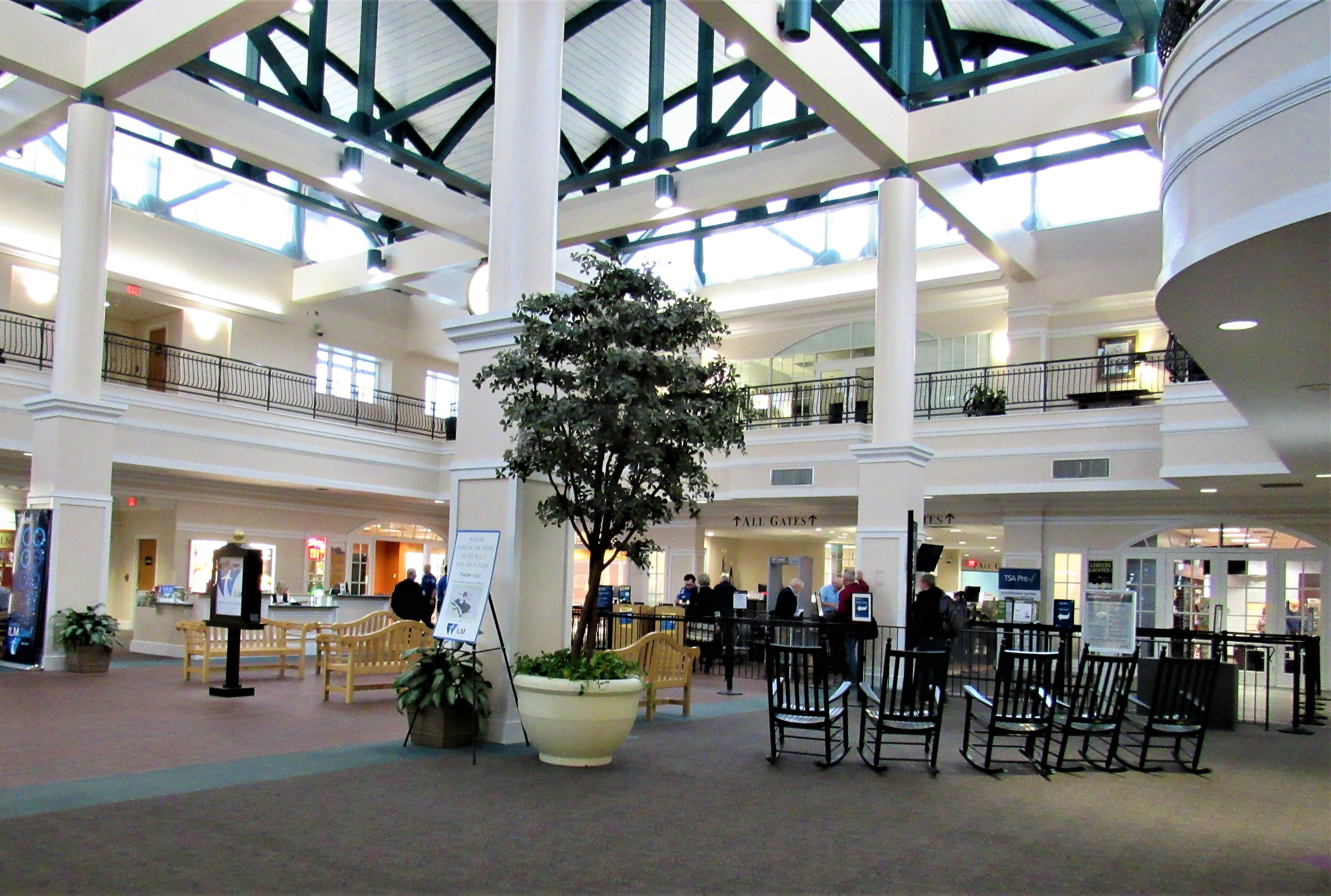
Lobby of the passenger terminal in 2020

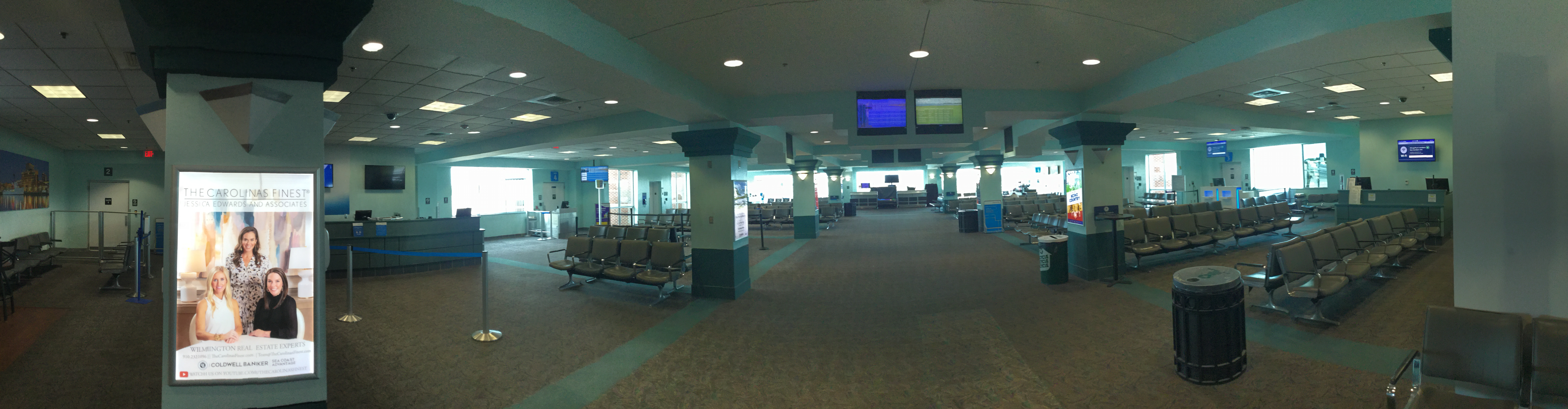
Interior design of the original terminal in 2022; now merged with the expanded terminal

The airport was named Bluethenthal Field on Memorial Day, May 30, 1928, in honor of Arthur Bluethenthal, a former All-American football player and decorated World War I pilot who was the first North Carolinian to die in the war.

During World War II, the airfield was used by the United States Army Air Forces Third Air Force for anti-submarine patrols and training using P-47 Thunderbolt aircraft. The Army expanded the airfield with three new 7,000-foot runways, and after the war, deeded the site back to New Hanover County at no cost.

In the 1950s it became known as the New Hanover County Airport. In 1988 the airport added "International" to become known as New Hanover County International Airport. On December 17, 1997, the New Hanover County Airport Authority changed the name to Wilmington International Airport.

Piedmont Airlines began commercial flights to Wilmington in February 1948, and used Wilmington as one of its initial crew bases. Its first route was between Wilmington and Cincinnati, Ohio, with stops in Pinehurst, Charlotte, Asheville, the Tri-Cities, and Lexington. Piedmont was the airport's only scheduled carrier as of 1975, with flights to Atlanta, Fayetteville, Jacksonville, Kinston, Myrtle Beach, New Bern, Norfolk, and Washington–National, using YS-11, FH-227 and Boeing 737 aircraft. Piedmont was acquired by USAir in 1989; USAir was renamed US Airways in 1997, and merged with American Airlines in 2013.

In addition to flights to its main regional hub at Charlotte Douglas International Airport, US Airways introduced three daily flights between Wilmington and LaGuardia Airport in New York City during the 2000s following lobbying from the Wilmington community. US Airways also introduced nonstop service to Ronald Reagan Washington National Airport in March 2011. American Eagle began service between Wilmington and Chicago O'Hare International Airport in July 2011 after the airport authority offered two years of waived fees and marketing cost sharing. This route had been actively sought by the local business community for its connections to the West Coast and to Asia. The route was discontinued on April 2, 2012, but reinstated in early 2018.

From April 2025 to January 2026, the airport was an operating base for Avelo Airlines.

ILM was one of four airports along the East Coast which served as an emergency abort landing site for the Space Shuttle. Improvements in the orbiter's braking system reduced the previous 10,000-foot (3,000 m) runway requirement to 7,500 feet (2,300 m) enabling ILM's 8,016-foot (2,443 m) runway to serve the role. ILM has also been used for touch-and-go training flights by United States Air Force VIP aircraft, including the Boeing VC-25 (Air Force One), C-32 and C-40.

=== Superfund site ===
A 1,500-square-foot (140 m^{2}) burn pit on the airport property was named a Superfund site on March 31, 1989. The burn pit was built in 1968 and was used until 1979 for firefighter training missions. Jet fuel, gasoline, petroleum storage tank bottoms, fuel oil, kerosene, and sorbent materials from oil spill cleanups were burned in the pit. Up to 500 gallons of fuel and other chemicals were used during each firefighting training exercise. The firefighters in the training missions mainly used water to put out the fires, but carbon dioxide and other dry chemicals were also used. The soil and groundwater was found to have multiple contaminants, including benzene, ethylbenzene, total xylene, 2-methylnaphthalene, phenanthrene, chloroform, 1,2-dichloroethane, and chromium. The site has finished environmental remediation, and the last five-year review for the site was completed in August 2013. According to the EPA the site has been delisted from the national priority list.

== Airlines and destinations ==
=== Passenger ===
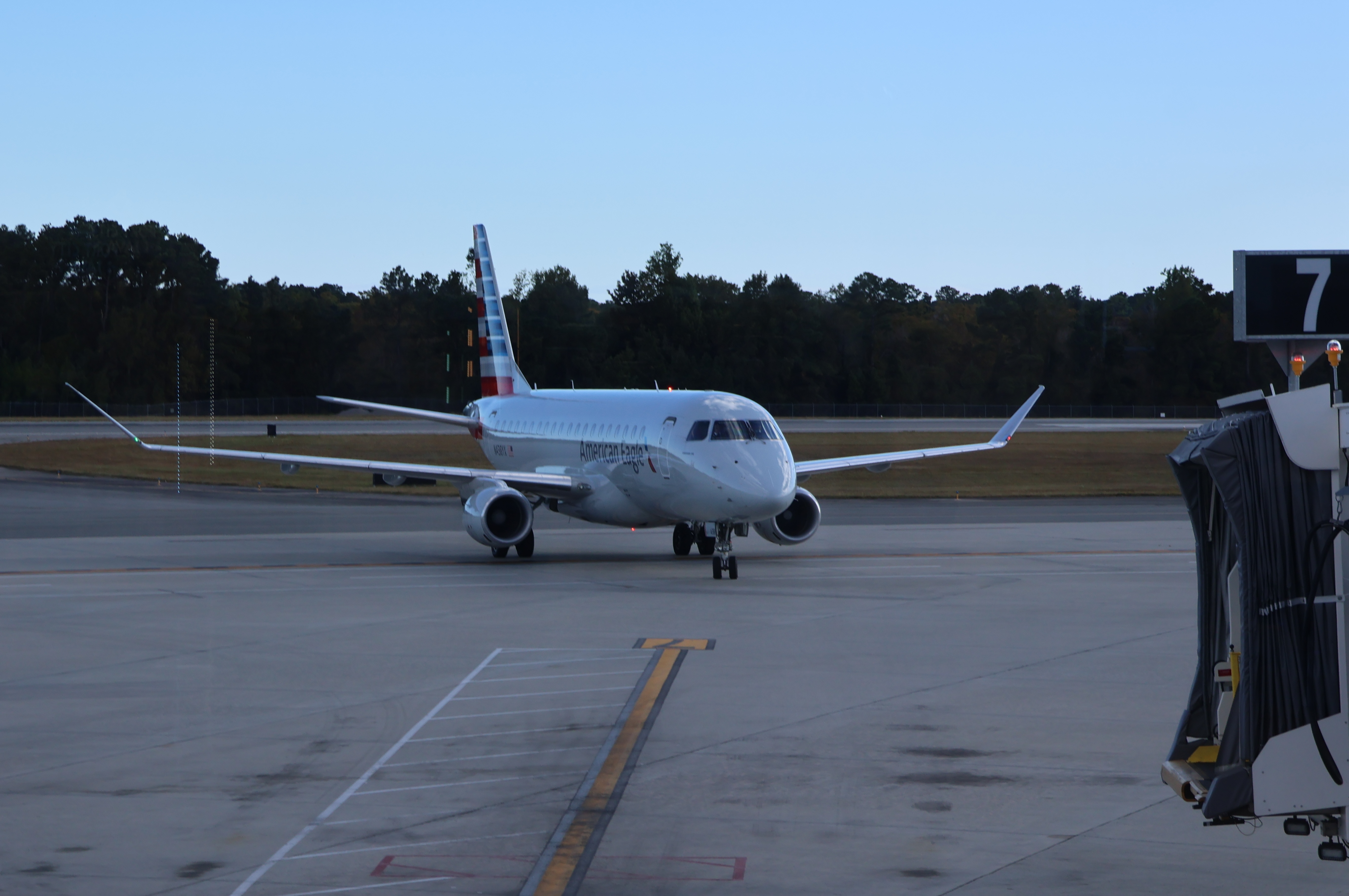
An American Eagle Embraer E175LR approaching Gate 7

| Airlines | Destinations |
|---|---|
| American Airlines | Charlotte, Dallas/Fort Worth, Miami |
| American Eagle | Charlotte, Dallas/Fort Worth, Miami, New York–LaGuardia, Philadelphia, Washington–National; Seasonal: Boston, Chicago–O'Hare |
| Avelo Airlines | Nashville, New Haven, Rochester (NY), Tampa; Seasonal: Baltimore, Wilmington (DE) |
| Breeze Airways | Akron/Canton, Fort Lauderdale, Fort Myers, Hartford, Long Island/Islip, Orlando, Providence, Tampa |
| Delta Air Lines | Atlanta; Seasonal: Minneapolis/St. Paul |
| Delta Connection | Atlanta, New York–LaGuardia; Seasonal: Boston |
| JetBlue | Seasonal: Boston |
| United Express | Newark; Seasonal: Chicago–O'Hare, Denver |

Destinations map
Destinations from Wilmington International Airport
Red = Year-round destination
Green = Seasonal destination

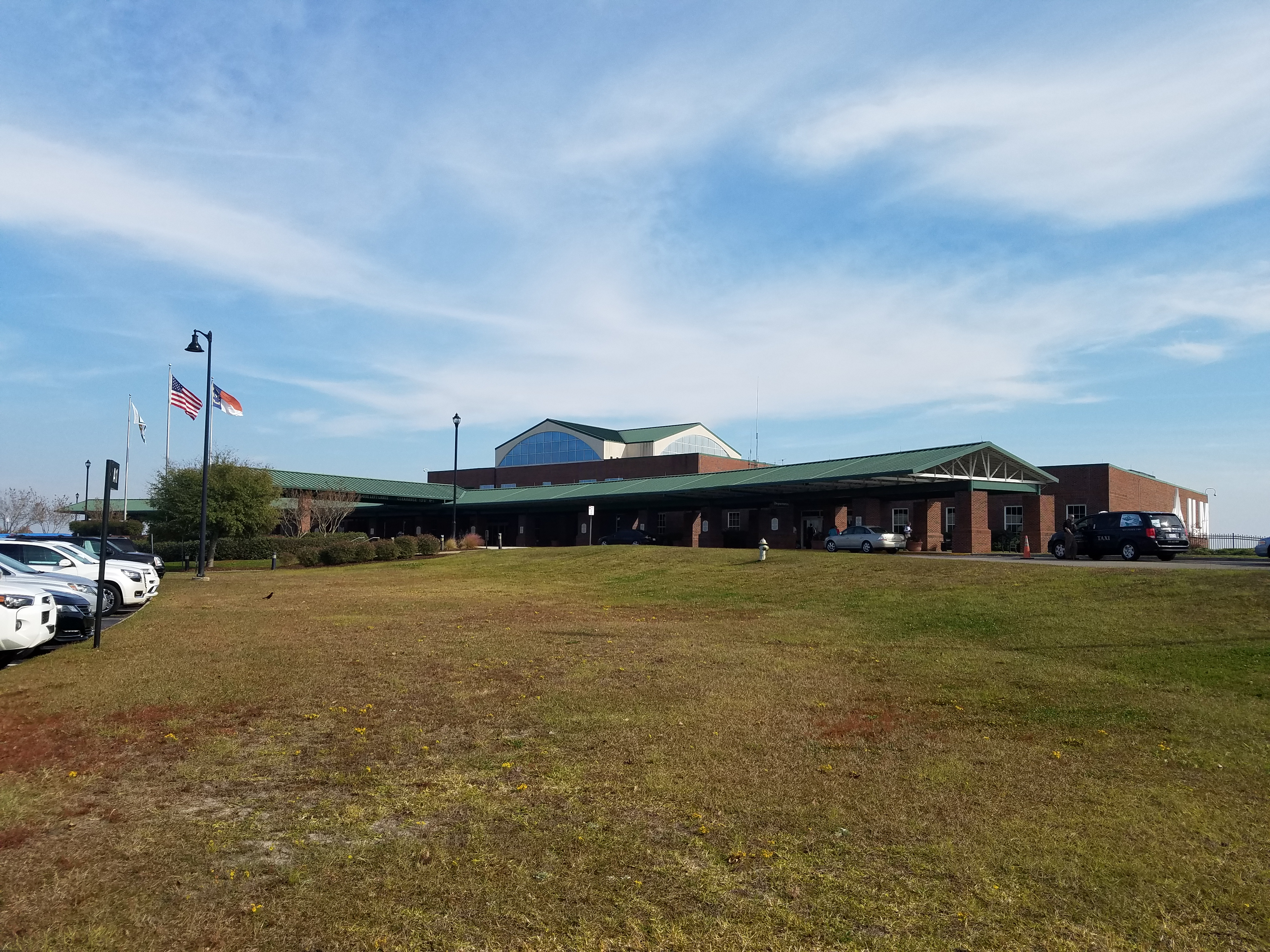
The passenger terminal seen from the main parking area

== Statistics ==
=== Top destinations ===
Busiest domestic routes from ILM (September 2025 – August 2026)
| Rank | City | Passengers | Airline |
|---|---|---|---|
| 1 | Charlotte, North Carolina | 254,830 | American |
| 2 | (Georgia (U.S. state)) Atlanta, Georgia | 125,590 | Delta |
| 3 | (New York (state)) New York–LaGuardia, New York | 91,890 | American, Delta |
| 4 | Dallas–Fort Worth, Texas | 73,320 | American |
| 5 | Philadelphia, Pennsylvania | 50,130 | American |
| 6 | Washington–National, Virginia | 36,610 | American |
| 7 | Chicago–O'Hare, Illinois | 36,530 | American, United |
| 8 | Boston, Massachusetts | 35,180 | Delta, JetBlue |
| 9 | Newark, New Jersey | 35,070 | United |
| 10 | Miami, Florida | 26,860 | American |

=== Airline market share ===
Largest airlines serving ILM (September 2025 – August 2026)
| Rank | Airline | Passengers | Market Share |
|---|---|---|---|
| 1 | American Airlines | 538,000 | 28.51% |
| 2 | Delta Air Lines | 223,000 | 11.81% |
| 3 | Piedmont Airlines | 198,000 | 10.49% |
| 4 | Republic Airways | 189,000 | 10.00% |
| 5 | Avelo Airlines | 174,000 | 9.23% |
| | Other | 565,000 | 29.95% |

=== Annual passenger traffic ===
Annual passenger traffic at ILM 2014–present
| Year | Passengers |
|---|---|
| 2014 | 776,102 |
| 2015 | 769,809 |
| 2016 | 817,896 |
| 2017 | 836,589 |
| 2018 | 934,058 |
| 2019 | 1,075,963 |
| 2020 | 477,242 |
| 2021 | 905,630 |
| 2022 | 1,086,245 |
| 2023 | 1,317,897 |
| 2024 | 1,465,869 |
| 2025 | 1,826,994 |

== Other operations ==
As of January 31, 2022, 107 aircraft were based at the airport. There was 67 single engine aircraft, 11 multi-engine aircraft, 21 jet engine aircraft, and 8 helicopters.

For the year ending January 31, 2022, the airport had 78,237 operations, an average of 214 per day: 14% air carrier, 14% air taxi, 55% general aviation, and 17% military.

Charter services include Air Wilmington, which has its own dedicated building. There are also several private and public hangars. A new international customs station was completed in 2008.

As of June 13, 2022, there are two fixed-base operators providing handling services to general aviation.

== Recent and future improvements ==
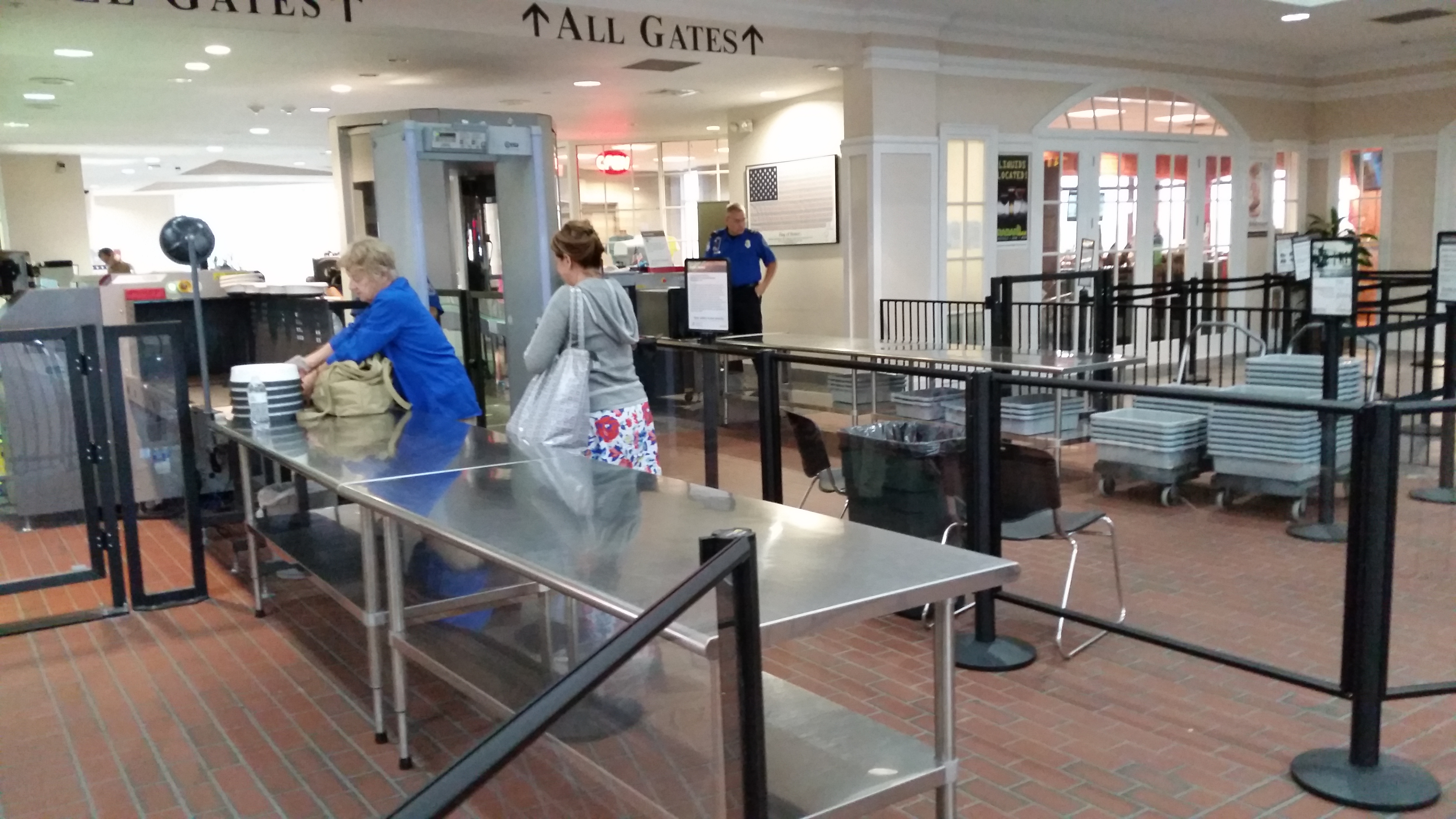
Security and TSA checkpoint in 2014. The checkpoint was expanded during phase 3 of terminal renovations.

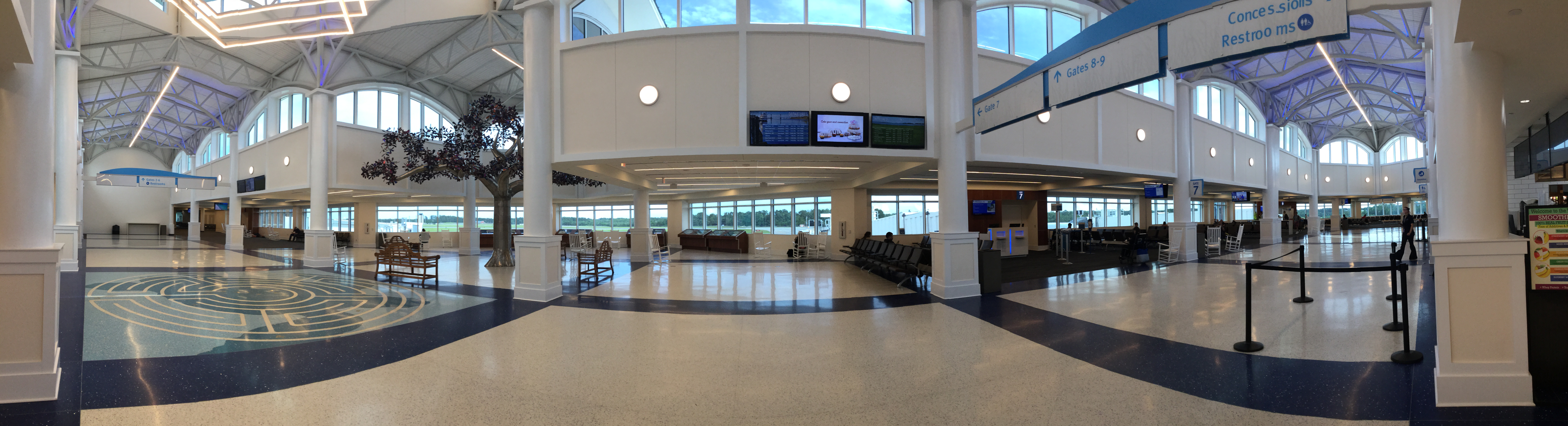
Entrance to the newly expanded terminal in 2022

Due to an increased number of passengers using the airport in recent years, Wilmington International Airport is undergoing many renovations and expansions. In 2008, the airport built a new terminal for use by U.S. Customs and Border Protection to process passengers from international flights. In 2006, it built a new Visual Approach Slope Indicator ILS for Runway 6/24.

In 2006, the FAA Airport Improvement Program awarded Wilmington International Airport $10,526,342. $3 million was allocated to improve runway safety areas, and $7,526,342 was allocated to expand the airport's apron area, rehabilitate Runway 6/24, and rehabilitate Taxiways B, C, and E. Runway 6/24 had not been rehabilitated in more than 30 years. Rehabilitation of Runway 17/35 was completed in 2014, and the project was honored with the Ray Brown Airport Pavement Award, which recognizes the highest-quality U.S. airfield pavement produced each year.

With passenger numbers continuing to grow rapidly, the airport began an $86 million terminal expansion project in 2018. The project is divided into three phases. Phase 1 reconstructed the TSA and DHS baggage screening facilities, and was largely unseen by passengers. Phase 1 began construction in the summer of 2018 and completed in April 2019. Phase 2 expanded the ticketing areas and airport offices. Construction for Phase 2 began in April 2019 and was completed in summer 2020. Phase 3 involved renovating and expanding the concourse and TSA security checkpoint to include more gates and screening lanes. Phase 3 began in fall 2020 and was completed in fall 2023.

Long-term plans for the airport include various projects on improving, expanding, and renovating infrastructure around the airport. In March 2023, a five-year Vision Plan was released which ranges from 2023 to 2027, and will cost around $165 million. A majority of the improvements will focus on the entrance and parking areas of the terminal, with construction of a 1,200-space parking deck, expansion of already-existing parking lots, and realignment of Airport Boulevard planned to be completed by 2027. A minor expansion of the terminal, as well as improvements to the existing building, are also included in the plan. The airport received a $4 million grant from the FAA, in February 2024, to partially fund the terminal access road/curb expansion and realignment project. In June 2023, construction was approved on a new parking lot with 950 spaces, costing around $4.6 million, and set to be completed in March 2024. Five months later in November, Parking Lot F was completed, which has space for 500 vehicles.

== Governance ==
Wilmington International Airport is owned by New Hanover County. In 1989, the North Carolina General Assembly, ratified Senate Bill 410 (Chapter 404), allowing New Hanover County to establish an airport authority. The county authorized the creation of the Wilmington Airport Authority, to assist the airport director in running the airport, on July 1, 1989. The airport is leased to the airport authority from New Hanover County for $1 per year until 2049. The lease was extended another 30 years after it originally expired in 2019.

The current airport director is Jeffrey Bourk, A.A.E., and the chair is Spruill Thompson. The New Hanover County Airport Authority has seven board members.

== Accidents and incidents ==
- On September 24, 1961, a USAF Fairchild C-123 Provider with 15 occupants aboard, including six skydivers, stalled and crashed after takeoff during an air show. There were three fatalities.
- On August 22, 1962, a Piedmont Airlines Martin 4-0-4 swerved off the runway at ILM during a training flight. All three occupants survived but the aircraft was written off.
- On October 4, 1975, a twin-engine Cessna 310 (N2956Q) piloted by 28-year-old Vietnam War veteran Joseph Michael Farkas and arriving from Charlotte, crashed short of the field after running out of fuel. The flight was carrying professional wrestling figures associated with Jim Crockett Promotions who were enroute to a card at Legion Stadium: promoter David Crockett and wrestlers Bobby Bruggers, Ric Flair, Johnny Valentine (then U.S. heavyweight champion, the promotion's top singles championship) and Tim Woods. While Farkas died after spending two months in a coma at New Hanover County Hospital, all of his passengers survived with various injuries. The accident was later ruled pilot error due to mismanagement of fuel.
- On April 23, 1987, a Swearingen Metro II operating a cargo flight for Air-Lift Commuter suffered an engine failure on takeoff at ILM and crashed, killing both occupants.
- On May 4, 1990, a GAF Nomad arriving from Raleigh–Durham crashed on approach to runway 34, killing both occupants.
- On January 4, 2009, a Caribair Cessna 550 Citation II (N815MA) is substantially damaged at the airport when it makes a wheels-up landing after running out of fuel.

== In popular culture ==
Several scenes for the television show One Tree Hill were filmed inside the terminal.

== See also ==
- List of airports in North Carolina
- North Carolina World War II Army Airfields
