= Goat Island (South Carolina) =

Island in South Carolina

Coordinates: 32.8062867°N 79.7659144°W

Goat Island is an island located between Mt. Pleasant and Isle of Palms, South Carolina, United States, on the Intracoastal Waterway. It is one of the smallest inhabited islands of the region, being only as large as a neighborhood street.

== Inhabitants ==
According to legend, in 1931, a married couple from Charleston, Blanche and Henry Holloway, moved to the island to escape the strictures of contemporary society, where they lived in isolation, with a herd of goats, for over 30 years. In 1961, the Holloways accepted a small hut as a gift from concerned neighbours; however Henry Holloway, known as the Goat Man, soon contracted pneumonia and died. Blanche Holloway survived alone on Goat Island for nearly a year after Henry's death; she died from burns caused by a wood-burning stove that was also a gift from the neighbours.
