= FEMA Public Assistance =

Public assistance program

FEMA's Public Assistance Program (PA) provides grants for disaster relief aid to state government agencies, local governments, federally recognized Indian tribes, and private non-profit organisations in the wake of a disaster. The program provides grants for two types of disaster recovery work. The first is emergency work – this includes the debris removal and the preventative measures taken to secure the property and prevent further damage to the property and to public health. The second is permanent work – which covers the measures needed to restore, or replace, the property.

== Eligibility ==
The four components of PA eligibility are applicant, facility, work and cost. An applicant must be a state, territory, tribe, local government or private nonprofit organization. Examples include local cities and counties, school districts, zoo's, special government districts, public authorities (e.g., water, sewer, or transportation authorities) and houses of worship. A facility must be a building, public works system, equipment or natural feature. These include buildings, grounds, physical property and equipment. Work is categorized as either "emergency" or "permanent." It must be required as a result of the declared incident, located within the designated disaster area, and is the legal responsibility of the applicant. Work cannot be related to damage previously incurred before the disaster. Cost is the funding tied directly to eligible work, and must be adequately documented, authorized, necessary and reasonable. Eligible costs include labor, equipment, materials, contract work, as well as direct and indirect administrative costs.

== Funding ==
It supplements any federal disaster grant assistance that a business or organization has already received. The federal share of assistance should be less than 75% of the eligible cost of emergency efforts and restoration. The remaining funds are generally allocated by the state government agencies and are distributed amongst eligible applicants.

In order to receive a grant, the applicant must register within 60 days of the disaster, and must be located in a designated disaster area and under the legal responsibility of an eligible applicant. Further, the facility should have been in active use at the time of the disaster; and open to the general public.

== Administration and distribution ==
FEMA oversees the program, establishes policies, and provides technical assistance to state and local stakeholder. The agency also ensures compliance with federal laws and policies, monitors participant progress, and conducts audits when required.

=== State, tribal, or territorial roles ===
Most state governments serve as Recipients, who manage the distribution of funds, and act as the liaison between FEMA and subrecipients (local governments or eligible private nonprofit organizations). Responsibilities include reviewing applications, facilitating communications, and ensuring compliance with program requirements.

=== Local government and PNP roles ===
Local governments and private nonprofit organizations act as Subrecipients, who apply for assistance and implement the FEMA approved projects. Subrecipients are responsible for documenting costs, maintaining transparency and communication, and complying with grant terms.

=== Distribution process ===
Subrecipients follow these steps to receive federal assistance:

1. Disaster Declaration
  - A state, tribal, or territorial government requests federal disaster assistance.
  - The President approves the request, triggering the availability of Public Assistance funding for the declared area.
2. Applicant Briefings: FEMA and the Recipient conduct briefings to inform potential applicants about the PA program, eligibility requirements, and the application process.
3. Request for Public Assistance (RPA):Applicants submit an RPA to indicate their interest in seeking federal assistance.
4. Damage Inventory and Project Formulation: Applicants identify and document disaster-related damage and associated costs.
5. FEMA works with applicants to develop projects, categorized as:
  - Small Projects: Lower-cost projects with simplified funding and documentation.
  - Large Projects: Higher-cost projects requiring more detailed reviews and oversight.
6. Project Approval and Grant Award: FEMA reviews project submissions for eligibility and compliance with program policies. Once approved, FEMA obligates funds to the Recipient, who then disburses them to the Subrecipients.
7. Payment Process: Payments are made on a reimbursement basis, with Subrecipients submitting documented expenses to the Recipient for review and payment. Advances may be provided in certain cases, especially for small projects or urgent emergency work.
