= Wrightsboro, North Carolina =

- CDP
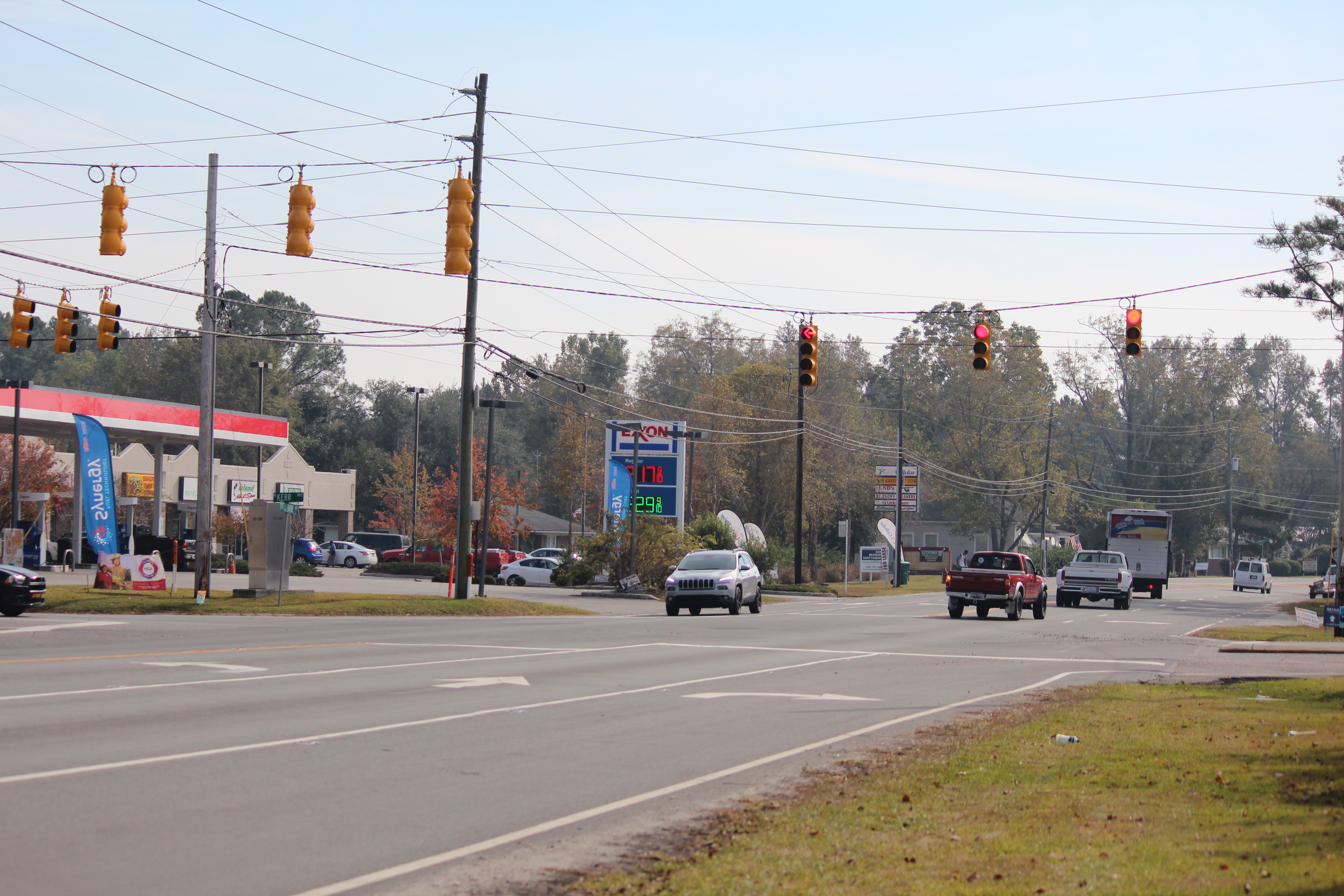
- Wrightsboro Plaza at the center of Wrightsboro

- Location in New Hanover County and the state of North Carolina.
- Coordinates: 34°17′22″N 77°55′18″W
- Country: United States
- State: North Carolina
- County: New Hanover

Area
  - Total: 11.58 sq mi (30.00 km^{2})
  - Land: 11.13 sq mi (28.83 km^{2})
  - Water: 0.45 sq mi (1.17 km^{2})
- Elevation: 33 ft (10 m)

Population (2020)
  - Total: 5,526
  - Density: 496.4/sq mi (191.67/km^{2})
- Time zone: UTC-5 (Eastern (EST))
  - Summer (DST): UTC-4 (EDT)
- FIPS code: 37-75780
- GNIS feature ID: 2403045

Wrightsboro is a census-designated place (CDP) in New Hanover County, North Carolina, United States. As of the 2020 census, Wrightsboro had a population of 5,526. It is part of the Wilmington Metropolitan Statistical Area.

== Geography ==
According to the United States Census Bureau, the CDP has a total area of 10.7 square miles (28 km^{2}), all land.

=== Landmark ===
- Tinga Nursery was listed on the National Register of Historic Places in 2000.

== Demographics ==
Historical population
Census	Pop.	Note	%±
1990	4,745		—
2000	4,496		−5.2%
2010	4,896		8.9%
2020	5,526		12.9%
U.S. Decennial Census

=== 2020 census ===
As of the 2020 census, Wrightsboro had a population of 5,526. The median age was 41.3 years. 20.8% of residents were under the age of 18 and 18.8% of residents were 65 years of age or older. For every 100 females there were 94.2 males, and for every 100 females age 18 and over there were 89.3 males age 18 and over.

92.3% of residents lived in urban areas, while 7.7% lived in rural areas.

There were 2,218 households in Wrightsboro, of which 28.2% had children under the age of 18 living in them. Of all households, 46.5% were married-couple households, 17.5% were households with a male householder and no spouse or partner present, and 29.4% were households with a female householder and no spouse or partner present. About 25.5% of all households were made up of individuals and 11.3% had someone living alone who was 65 years of age or older.

There were 2,348 housing units, of which 5.5% were vacant. The homeowner vacancy rate was 1.3% and the rental vacancy rate was 4.4%.

Wrightsboro racial composition
Race	Number	Percentage
White (non-Hispanic)	3,145	56.91%
Black or African American (non-Hispanic)	1,476	26.71%
Native American	16	0.29%
Asian	32	0.58%
Pacific Islander	2	0.04%
Other/Mixed	277	5.01%
Hispanic or Latino	578	10.46%

=== 2000 census ===
At the 2000 census, there were 4,496 people, 1,777 households and 1,284 families residing in the CDP. The population density was 418.9 inhabitants per square mile (161.7/km^{2}). There were 1,897 housing units at an average density of 176.7 per square mile (68.2/km^{2}). The racial makeup of the CDP was 63.99% White, 33.59% African American, 0.62% Native American, 0.20% Asian, 0.02% Pacific Islander, 0.56% from other races, and 1.02% from two or more races. Hispanic or Latino of any race were 1.53% of the population.

There were 1,777 households, of which 33.3% had children under the age of 18 living with them, 53.9% were married couples living together, 14.9% had a female householder with no husband present, and 27.7% were non-families. 23.4% of all households were made up of individuals, and 7.3% had someone living alone who was 65 years of age or older. The average household size was 2.53 and the average family size was 2.97.

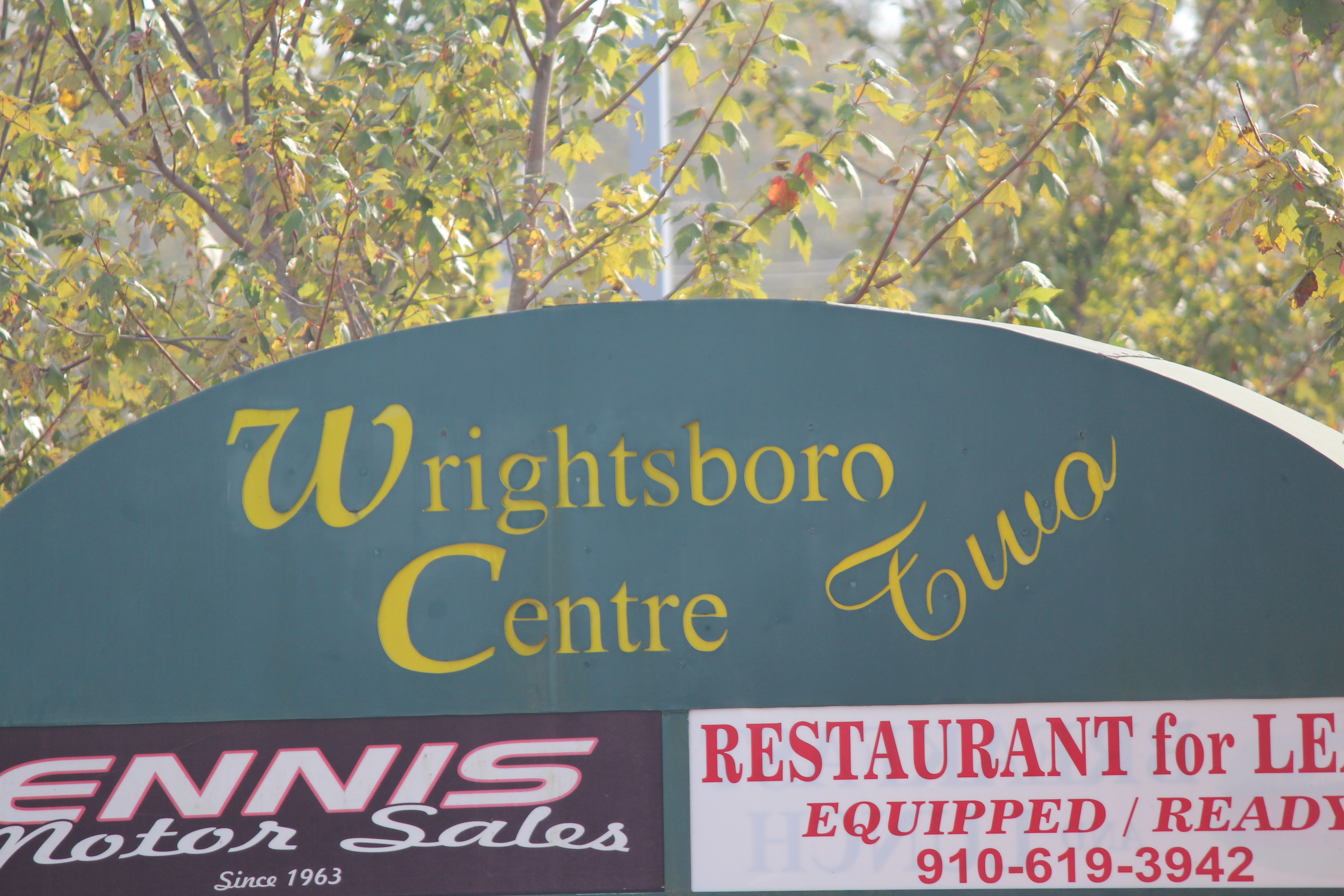
Wrightsboro Center Two in Wrightsboro

25.6% of the population were under the age of 18, 7.1% from 18 to 24, 31.2% from 25 to 44, 25.1% from 45 to 64, and 11.0% who were 65 years of age or older. The median age was 37 years. For every 100 females, there were 94.3 males. For every 100 females age 18 and over, there were 89.2 males.

The median household income was $37,876 and the median family income was $40,327. Males had a median income of $31,667 compared with $24,173 for females. The per capita income for the CDP was $17,681. About 6.5% of families and 10.5% of the population were below the poverty line, including 19.6% of those under age 18 and 8.0% of those age 65 or over.
